= 1210s =

Decade

The 1210s was a decade of the Julian Calendar which began on January 1, 1210, and ended on December 31, 1219.

== Events ==
=== 1210 ===
==== By place ====
====== Europe ======
- May – The Second Parliament of Ravennika, convened by Emperor Henry of Flanders, is held in the town of Ravennika (in modern Greece), in order to resolve the differences between the princes of Frankish Greece, and the Roman Catholic clergy of their domains. The assembled nobles and prelates conclude a concordat, which recognizes the independence and immunity of all Church property in Frankish Greece from any feudal duties.
- July 18 – Battle of Gestilren: Sverker the Younger, the exiled former King of Sweden, is defeated and killed by the reigning King Erik Knutsson. After the battle, Erik takes the Swedish throne and marries Princess Rikissa of Denmark, daughter of the late King Valdemar I of Denmark to improve the relations with Denmark, which had supported King Sverker.
- November 18 – Emperor Otto IV is excommunicated by Pope Innocent III after he occupies Apulia in southern Italy. Otto annuls the Concordat of Worms and demands from Innocent recognition of the imperial crown's right. A German civil war breaks out, and Otto prepares an invasion against Frederick II, king of Sicily.
- November 21 – Eric X is crowned – which is the first known coronation of a Swedish king. He strengthens his relationship with his brother-in-law, King Valdemar II of Denmark ("the Conqueror"). Shortly after, Valdemar conquers Danzig (modern-day Gdańsk) on the Baltic coast, and Eastern Pomerania from the Slavonic Wends.
- November 22 – Siege of Termes: The Castle of Termes falls to Simon de Montfort during the Albigensian Crusade.
- Battle of Ümera: Estonian forces defeat the Crusaders of the Livonian Brothers of the Sword. The Estonians pursue the fleeing Crusaders and according to the Livonian Chronicle some of the prisoners are burned alive, while others have crosses carved on their backs with swords before being executed as well.

====== England ======
- The Papal Interdict of 1208 remains in force.
- King John extends his taxes and raises £100,000 from church property as an extraordinary fiscal levy; the operation is described as an “inestimable and incomparable exaction” by contemporary sources.
- November 1 – John orders that Jews across the country have to pay a tallage, a sum of money to the king. Those who do not pay are arrested and imprisoned. Many Jews are executed or leave the country.

====== Levant ======
- September 14 – The 18-year-old Maria of Montferrat marries the French nobleman John of Brienne, who brings a dowry of 40,000 silver pounds (from King Philip II and Pope Innocent III). On October 3, the couple is crowned as King and Queen of Jerusalem in the Crusader Cathedral of Tyre (modern Lebanon).

====== Asia ======
- Jochi, Mongol leader and eldest son of Genghis Khan, begins a campaign against the Kyrgyz. Meanwhile, Emperor Xiang Zong of Western Xia agrees to submit to Mongol rule, he gives his daughter, Chaka, in marriage to Genghis and pays him a tribute of camels, falcons, and textiles.
- December 12 – Emperor Tsuchimikado abdicates the throne in favor of his younger brother, Juntoku, after a 12-year reign. He is the second son of the former Emperor Go-Toba and becomes the 84th emperor of Japan.

==== By topic ====
====== Art and Culture ======
- 1210–1211 – Shazi creates the Pen Box, from Persia (Iran) or Afghanistan (it is now kept at Freer Gallery of Art, Smithsonian Institution, Washington, D.C.).
- Gottfried von Strassburg writes his epic poem Tristan (approximate date).

====== Astronomy ======
- September 24 – Venus occults Jupiter (the last such occurrence until 1570).

====== Religion ======
- Pope Innocent III allows the formation of the mendicant order of Francis of Assisi, to begin the Order of Friars Minor.
- The church of St Helen's Bishopsgate in the City of London is founded, as a priory of Benedictine nuns.

=== 1211 ===
==== By place ====
====== Byzantine Empire ======
- June 17 – Battle of Antioch on the Meander: Seljuk forces led by Sultan Kaykhusraw I are initially victorious with the Latin mercenary cavalry (some 800 men) bearing the brunt of the casualties due to their flanking charge; exhausted by the effort in their attack, the Latin army under Emperor Theodore I Laskaris is struck in the flank and rear by the Seljuk forces. However, the Seljuks stop the fight in order to plunder the Latin camp – which allows Theodore's forces to rally and counter-attack the now disorganized Turks. Meanwhile, Kaykhusraw seeks out Theodore and engages him in single combat, but he is unhorsed and beheaded. The Seljuks are routed and the former Byzantine emperor Alexios III Angelos, Theodore's father-in-law, is captured and imprisoned, ending his days in enforced monastic seclusion.
- October 15 – Battle of the Rhyndacus: Latin emperor Henry of Flanders lands with an expeditionary force (some 3,000 men) at Pegai, and marches eastwards to the Rhyndacus River. The Byzantine army (much larger in force overall) under Theodore I prepare an ambush, but Henry assaults his positions along the river and defeats the Byzantine army in a day-long battle. Henry marches unopposed through the remaining Byzantine lands, reaching south as far as Nymphaion.

====== Mongol Empire ======
- Spring – Genghis Khan summons his Mongol chieftains, and prepares to wage war against the Jurchen-led Jin dynasty in northern China. He advances across the Gobi Desert with a massive army of 100,000 warriors with 300,000 horses, strung out in perhaps 10–20 groups of 5,000–10,000 men each, each with camel-drawn carts, and all linked by fast-moving messengers. Meanwhile, the Jin Government mobilizes an army of 800,000 men, most of which are untrained peasants with low morale, and some 150,000 highly-trained cavalry. This vast army, however, is spread across the Great Wall, and garrisoned separate fortresses.
- Battle of Yehuling: Genghis Khan bypasses the Great Wall with little opposition, and splits his forces into two armies. The main army (60,000 men) is led by himself, and the other army is taken by his son Ögedei to attack the city of Datong. Genghis heads for the strategic Juyong Pass ("Young Badger's Mouth") – which leads down to the capital of Zhongdu (modern-day Beijing), but along the way he is halted at the pass of Yehuling where the bulk of the Jin army awaits him. Between March and October, the battle is fought in three stages, after Genghis has defeated the Jin forces, he begins raiding the countryside before he withdraws for the winter.

====== Europe ======
- Spring – Albigensian Crusade: Crusader forces led by Simon de Montfort conquer Toulouse and besiege Lavaur in southern France. On May 3, the city is retaken; on orders of Montfort the senior knights are hanged and some 400 Cathars are burned alive.
- March 26 – King Sancho I of Portugal ("the Populator") dies after a 25-year reign at Coimbra. He is succeeded by his son Afonso II ("the Fat") as ruler of Portugal. During his reign, he designs the first set of Portuguese written laws.
- Livonian Crusade: Battles of Viljandi and Turaida – The Crusaders fail to conquer the Viljandi stronghold, but manage to baptize Sakala and Ugandi counties (Southern Estonia).
- September – The 16-year-old Frederick II is elected in absentia as German king by rebellious nobleman (supported by Pope Innocent III) at the Diet of Nuremberg (Germany).

====== Britain ======
- Summer – King John of England ("Lackland") campaigns in Wales against Llywelyn the Great, prince of Gwynedd. In July, after the Welsh uprising, John and Llywelyn reach an agreement and a peace treaty is signed.
- June – Papal legate Pandulf Verraccio arrives in Northampton to serve John with his excommunication ordered by Innocent III. For John this is a serious blow to his ability to rule the country.
- John sends a gift of herrings to nunneries in almost every shire, despite his status as an excommunicant.
- The Papal Interdict of 1208 laid by Innocent III remains in force after John refuses to accept the pope's appointee.

====== Asia ======
- June – Shams ud-Din Iltutmish, son-in-law of the former Sultan Qutb al-Din Aibak, becomes ruler of the Delhi Sultanate and quells the Hindu rebellions in India.

==== By topic ====
====== Religion ======
- April 21 – Santiago de Compostela Cathedral (begun in the 11th century) is consecrated, in the presence of King Alfonso IX of León.
- Archbishop Aubrey (or 'Alberic of Humbert') lays the first stone of the chevet of Reims Cathedral.

=== 1212 ===
==== By place ====
====== England ======
- July 10 – The Great Fire: The most severe of several early fires of London burns most of the city to the ground; over 3,000 people die, many of them by drowning in the River Thames. According to a contemporary account: "An awful fire broke out on the Southwark side of London Bridge; while it was raging, a fire broke out at the other end also and so hemmed in the numerous crowds who had assembled to help the distressed. The sufferers, to avoid the flames, threw themselves over the bridge into boats and barges; but many of these sunk, the people crowding into them.".
- John, King of England, impounds the revenue of all prelates appointed by bishops, who have deserted him at his excommunication. He remains on good terms, however, with churchmen who stood by him, including Abbot Sampson, who this year bequeaths John his jewels.

====== Europe ======
- Spring – After the fall of Argos the Crusaders complete their conquest of the Morea in southern Greece. The city, along with Nauplia, is given to Othon de la Roche, a Burgundian nobleman, as a fief, along with an income of 400 hyperpyron from Corinth. Meanwhile, the Venetians conquer Crete and evict Henry, Count of Malta ("Enrico Pescatore"), a Genoese adventurer and pirate, active in the Mediterranean.
- July 16 – Battle of Las Navas de Tolosa: The Christian forces of King Alfonso VIII of Castile ("the Noble") decisively defeat the Almohad army (some 30,000 men) led by Caliph Muhammad al-Nasir. The victory gives a further impulse to the Reconquista but this leaves the Kingdom of Castile in a difficult financial position, as numerous soldiers have to be paid by the treasury.
- The Children's Crusade is organized. There are probably two separate movements of young people, both led by shepherd boys, neither of which embark for the Holy Land – but both of which suffer considerable hardship.
  - Early Spring – Nicholas leads a group from the Rhineland and crosses the alps into Italy. In August, he arrives with some 7,000 children in Genoa. Nicholas travels to the Papal States where he meets Pope Innocent III.
  - June – The 12-year-old Stephen of Cloyes leads a group across France to Vendôme. Attracting a following of over 30,000 adults and children. After arriving in Marseille the vast majority return home to their families.
- December 9 – The 18-year-old Frederick II is crowned King of the Germans at Mainz. Frederick's authority in Germany remains tenuous, and he is recognized only in southern Germany. In the region of northern Germany, the center of Guelph power, his rival Otto IV continues to hold the imperial power despite his excommunication.
- The Teutonic Order builds Bran Castle in the Burzenland (modern Romania) as a fortified position at the entrance of a mountain pass through which traders can travel. The Teutonic Knights build another five castles, some of them made of stone. Their rapid expansion in Hungary makes the nobility and clergy, who are previously uninterested in those regions, jealous and suspicious.
- A storm surge in the north of Holland claims approximately 60,000 lives.

====== Asia ======
- Autumn – Genghis Khan invades Jin territory and besieges Datong. During the assault, he is wounded by an arrow in his knee and orders a withdrawal for rest and relaxation.

==== By topic ====
====== Literature ======
- Kamo no Chōmei, a Japanese poet and essayist, writes the Hōjōki, one of the great works of classical Japanese prose.

====== Religion ======
- The contemplative Order of Poor Clares is founded by Clare of Assisi (approximate date).
- The Papal Interdict of 1208 laid on England and Wales by Innocent III remains in force.

=== 1213 ===
- May 15 – King John of England submits to Pope Innocent III, who in turn lifts the interdict of 1208 the following year.
- May 30 – Battle of Damme: The English fleet under William Longespée, 3rd Earl of Salisbury, destroys a French fleet off the Belgian port in the first major victory for the fledgling Royal Navy.
- September 12 – Battle of Muret: The Toulousain and Aragonese forces of Raymond VI of Toulouse and Peter II of Aragon are defeated by the Albigensian Crusade, under Simon de Montfort.
- Jin China is overrun by the Mongols under Genghis Khan, who plunder the countryside and cities, until only Beijing remains free, despite two bloody palace coups and a lengthy siege.
- Pope Innocent III issues a charter calling for the Fifth Crusade to recapture Jerusalem.

=== 1214 ===
==== By place ====
====== Byzantine Empire ======
- November 1 – Siege of Sinope: The Seljuk Turks under Sultan Kaykaus I capture the strategic Black Sea port city of Sinope – at the time held by the Empire of Trebizond (one of the Byzantine successor states formed after the Fourth Crusade). Emperor Alexios I of Trebizond leads an army to break the siege, but he is defeated and captured. His capture forces the Byzantines to accept tributary status to Kaykaus.

====== Europe ======
- February 15 – John, King of England ("Lackland") lands with an invasion force (accompanied by mercenaries) at La Rochelle; many barons of England refuse to join him in the campaign. John sends his half-brother William Longespée ("Long Sword") to Flanders, with money to assemble a mercenary army there. John pushes the French forces northeast from Poitou towards Paris, while Emperor Otto IV marches southwest from Flanders. King Philip II of France (Augustus) decides to defend his territories by leaving a third of his army under his son, Prince Louis to confront John in the Loire Valley – while Philip heads for Flanders to raid the region. On July 2, John's forces are confronted by a French relief force while they besiege the castle of Roche-au-Moine. John retreats to La Rochelle, but his rearguard suffers immensely by the French army.
- June – Otto IV arrives in Flanders with a small army; four German nobles have joined him, but he is soon reinforced by troops of Renaud I, duke of Boulogne, Ferdinand, (jure uxoris) count of Flanders and the mercenaries under William Longespée. On July 26, Philip II arrives at the Flemish town of Tournai with his army (some 7,000 men), while the allied forces encamp 12 kilometers south at the Castle of Mortagne (France).
- July 2 – The Papal Interdict of 1208, laid against the Kingdom of England, is lifted.
- July 27 – Battle of Bouvines: Philip II defeats an army (some 9,000 men) of German, English and Flemish soldiers led by Otto IV near Bouvines, ending the Anglo-French War. The French forces have taken a considerable number of soldiers prisoner, including 131 knights and five counts with Ferdinand, Renaud I and William Longespée among them.
- September 18 – Treaty of Chinon: John of England makes a truce with Philip II at the Castle of Chinon, and recognizes the Capetian (French) territorial gains at the expense of the Angevin Empire.
- October 5 – Upon the death of their father, King Alfonso VIII of Castile ("the Noble"), and of their mother, Eleanor of England, Queen of Castile on October 31, Berenguela becomes regent of her 10-year-old brother, Henry I.
- November 20 – A group of English nobles, after finding a copy of the Charter of Liberties, swear an oath at the altar of Bury St Edmunds, to force King John to acknowledge their rights.
- December 4 – King William the Lion of Scotland dies after a 49-year reign at Stirling. He is succeeded by his son, Alexander II, who is crowned at Scone (until 1249).

====== Asia ======
- Spring – Emperor Xuan Zong of the Jurchen-led Chinese Jin dynasty surrenders to the Mongols under Genghis khan – who have besieged the capital of Zhongdu (modern-day Beijing) for a year. He is forced to pay tribute (including some 3,000 horses, 10,000 'bolts' of silk and his daughter), along with subjugation to the Mongol Khan. Xuan Zong abandons northern China and moves his court to Kaifeng.
- After securing all Jin lands north of the Yellow River, Genghis Khan receives a message that Xuan Zong has moved his capital to Kaifeng. He returns to Zhongdu and precedes the city with the help of thousands of Chinese engineers. The Mongols starve the city out (the inhabitants are forced to eat the dead). The garrison, with a short supply of ammunition for the cannons holds out for the winter.
- In his campaigns in Liaodong, the Mongol general Muqali (or Mukhali) forms a newly Khitan-Chinese army and a special corps of some 12,000 Chinese auxiliary troops.

==== By topic ====
====== Education ======
- June 20 – A papal ordinance defines the rights of the scholars at the University of Oxford in England.

====== Religion ======
- April 13 – Simon of Apulia is elected bishop of Exeter in England (approximate date).

=== 1215 ===
==== By continent ====
====== Europe ======
- January 8 – Simon de Montfort, 5th Earl of Leicester, is elected lord of Languedoc in a council at Montpellier (Southern France), after his campaign against the Cathar heretics during the Albigensian Crusade. The Crusaders capture Château de Castelnaud-la-Chapelle and enter Toulouse; the town pays an indemnity of 30,000 marks and is gifted to Montfort.
- March 4 – King John of England ("Lackland"), hoping to gain the support of Pope Innocent III against the Barons, takes the oath to go on Crusade. By doing so, Innocent declares John to be his vassal and claims ownership of the whole kingdom (with political protection under church law). On April 1, Innocent sends a letter to the Barons, asking them to halt their actions against John.
- May 5 – Robert Fitzwalter is elected by the Barons as their general, with the title of "Marshal of the Army of God and Holy Church". He solemnly renounces his homage to John of England and begins to siege Northampton Castle. While this fails, Robert consolidates his forces. He turns to Prince Louis of France, son and heir apparent of King Philip II for support.
- May 17 – The gates to London are opened by supporters of the rebellious Barons. The houses of Jews are targeted for ransacking and burning. The rebels, under Robert Fitzwalter, call for the English nobles still on the side of King John to join them, and repair the walls. The Tower of London, held by John's supporters, is too well defended to fall into the hands of the rebels.
- June 15 – A large number of barons, led by Stephen Langton, archbishop of Canterbury, meet King John of England on an island in the Thames at Runnymede. They force John to sign Magna Carta, a document that grants liberties to the "free men" – the Barons, the church and the towns. He is subjected to the rule of law, by confirming the status of trial by jury, on June 19.
- Summer – Emperor Otto IV is excommunicated and forced to abdicate as ruler of the Holy Roman Empire. The German nobles, supported by Innocent III, again elect the 20-year-old Frederick II as King of the Romans who is crowned in Aachen, on July 25. The same day, Frederick takes the Cross and promises to go on Crusade.
- August – King John of England rejects Magna Carta and writes to Innocent III – asking him to cancel the charter on grounds that he signed it against his will. At the same time, John continues to build up his mercenary army.
- August 24 – Pope Innocent III annuls Magna Carta, freeing King John from its limitations. He annuls the charter on the grounds that John signed it because he is forced and that the document is illegal.
- November 11–30 – The Fourth Council of the Lateran (or "Great Council") convened by Innocent III ends at Rome and approves the papal proposal for a Fifth Crusade in Palestine. The Pope promulgates a canon against clerical participation in trial by ordeal, replacing it by compurgation.
- September 13 – King John of England seeks help from Innocent III in his fight against the Barons. In a letter, written while staying at Dover Castle, he states that the defense of England is the responsibility of God and the Pope.
- October – The Barons offer the English crown to Louis of France and invite him to England. King John England confiscates the Barons' land and besieges Rochester Castle; the garrison is starved out and surrenders to him.
- December – First Barons' War: King John of England campaigns successfully in the Midlands and captures Nottingham Castle, on December 24. King Alexander II of Scotland joins the Barons and invades Northern England.

====== Asia ======
- June 1 – Mongol conquest of Jin China: After the long Battle of Zhongdu, the Mongol forces capture Zhongdu (modern-day Beijing). Meanwhile, Genghis Khan has decamped to the edge of the grasslands and is on his way back to the Kherlen River. Without his restraining influence, the Mongols run wild. They devastate and ransack the city, killing thousands. The royal palace goes up in flames, and a part of the capital burns for a month.
- King Kalinga Magha, from Kalinga Province in India, lands in Sri Lanka with a force of 24,000 men, to capture the city of Polonnaruwa and depose its king, Parakrama Pandya.

==== By topic ====
====== Art and Science ======
- 1215–1216 – The Macy Jug, from Iran, is made. It is now kept at the Metropolitan Museum of Art, New York.

=== 1216 ===
==== By continent ====
====== Europe ======
- Spring – First Barons' War: The English army, led by John, King of England ("Lackland"), sacks the town of Berwick-on-Tweed and raids southern Scotland. John pushes up towards Edinburgh over a ten-day period. On his return, he puts down a revolt in East Anglia. On March 24, he arrives at Hertford to deal with the challenge of a coming French invasion.
- April 10 – Ten-year-old John I, son of the former King Sverker II ("the Younger") succeeds Eric X ("Knutsson") as King of Sweden, when Eric dies of fever at the end of a 8-year reign, at Näs Castle on the island of Visingsö.
- April 22 – Battle of Lipitsa: The Kievan princes Mstislav Mstislavich and Konstantin of Rostov defeat Konstantin's younger brothers Yuri II and Yaroslav II for the rule of the Principality of Vladimir-Suzdal (modern Russia).
- May 18 – King John of England assembles a naval force to defend against a French invasion. Bad storms disperse the fleet, and John spends the summer reorganizing defenses across the country. He sees several of his military household desert to the barons, including his half-brother, William Longespée, who is the commander of John's army in the south.
- May 21 – Prince Louis of France, son of King Philip II ("Augustus"), invades England in support of the barons, landing in Thanet. He enters London without opposition, and is proclaimed, but not crowned, King of England at Old St Paul's Cathedral. In June, Louis captures Rochester Castle and Winchester, and soon controls over half of the English kingdom.
- June – The rebel English barons besiege Windsor Castle and Dover Castle; the latter is strategically important as the 'gateway to England', controlling the shortest route to France. Meanwhile, King John uses Corfe Castle in the southwest as his base of operations while he plans his campaign against the barons and the French invading army under Louis.
- July 24 – Albigensian Crusade: French forces under Raymond VII, count of Toulouse, besiege Castle Beaucaire in May. After three months, the occupants are running low on supplies and surrender to Raymond.
- October 19 – Ten-year-old Henry III succeeds his father, King John of England, when the latter dies of dysentery at Newark Castle, Nottinghamshire). William Marshal, 1st Earl of Pembroke, becomes regent.
- November 12 – William Marshal and Cardinal Guala Bicchieri, Italian diplomat and papal legate to England, issue a Charter of Liberties, based on Magna Carta, in the new king's name.

====== Levant ======
- February 14 – Leo I, King of Armenia ("the Magnificent"), with support of the Knights Hospitaller, reconquers the Principality of Antioch. Armenian troops enter Antioch while Prince Bohemond IV of Antioch ("the One-Eyed") is absent. The Knights Templar, supporting Bohemond, abandon the citadel, and Raymond-Roupen is installed as Prince of Antioch by the Latin Patriarch, Peter II.
- October 8 – Az-Zahir Ghazi, Ayyubid ruler of Aleppo, dies after a 23-year reign. He is succeeded by his 3-year-old son Al-Aziz Muhammad. Because of his young age, Toghril becomes Al-Aziz's regent or guardian (atabeg).

==== By topic ====
====== Religion ======
- May – Pope Innocent III travels to Perugia to try to settle the long feud between Genoa and Pisa, that both states might contribute to the transport of the Fifth Crusade. There, after a short illness, Innocent dies on July 16. Two days after his death the aged Cardinal Cencio Savelli (later Honorius III) is elected as the 177th pope of the Catholic Church.
- December 22 – Honorius III officially approves the Order of Preachers (the Dominican Order), by the Papal bull Religiosam vitam.
- Ballintubber Abbey is founded by King Cathal Crobhdearg Ua Conchobair of Connacht, in Ireland.

=== 1217 ===
==== Fifth Crusade ====
- Summer – Various groups of French knights reach the Italian ports. King Andrew II of Hungary arrives with his army in Split, in Dalmatia. He is joined by German forces, led by Duke Leopold VI (the Glorious). At the end of July, Pope Honorius III orders the crusaders assembled in Italy and Sicily to proceed to Cyprus, but there is no transport provided by the Italian city-states, Venice, Genoa and Pisa.
- September: Leopold VI finds some ships in Split, that bring him and a small force to Acre. Andrew follows him about a fortnight later; in Split, he receives only two ships. The rest of Andrew's army is left behind. Meanwhile, King Hugh I of Cyprus lands at Acre, with troops to support the Crusade.
- November – The Crusader army (some 15,000 men) under Andrew II sets out from Acre, and marches up the Plain of Esdraelon. Sultan Al-Adil I, on hearing that the crusaders are assembling, sends some Muslim troops to Palestine, to halt their advance. The crusaders move towards Beisan, while Al-Adil waits at Ajloun Castle, ready to intercept any attack on Damascus. He sends his son, Al-Mu'azzam, to cover Jerusalem. On November 10, Andrew's well-mounted army defeats Al-Adil at Bethsaida, on the Jordan River. Beisan is occupied and sacked; the Muslims retreat to their fortresses and towns.
- December – King John I of Jerusalem leads an expedition into Lebanon. On December 3, he undertakes fruitless assaults on Muslim fortresses and on Mount Tabor. Meanwhile, the Crusader army under Andrew II wanders across the Jordan Valley and up the eastern shore of the Sea of Galilee. During the occupation, Andrew spends his time collecting alleged relics. By the end of December, supplies run out, and the crusaders retreat to Acre.

==== Other events by place ====
====== Europe ======
- Spring – First Barons' War: English forces of King Henry III besiege the French-controlled Mountsorrel Castle in Leicestershire. Prince Louis sends reinforcements (some 20,000 men) to assist the Barons in the castle. The English army lifts the siege and withdraws to Nottingham. Louis makes the mistake of moving the French forces to Lincoln Castle – where the English garrison holds out against previous attacks. Meanwhile, Henry's forces return to Mountsorrel Castle. This time Louis fails to arrive in time to prevent the razing to the ground of the castle.
- April 9 – Peter II of Courtenay is crowned emperor of the Latin Empire of Constantinople at Rome, by Pope Honorius III. Shortly after his coronation, Peter borrows some ships from the Venetians, promising in return to conquer Durazzo for them. He fails in this enterprise and seeks to make his way to Constantinople by land. On the journey, he is seized by troops of Theodore Komnenos Doukas, despot of Epirus, and is put in prison.
- May 20 – Battle of Lincoln: Henry III's forces led by William Marshal, 1st Earl of Pembroke defeat the French army of Prince Louis and the rebel barons who are besieging Lincoln Castle. During the battle, Thomas, Comte du Perche is killed and Louis is expelled from his base in the southeast of England. The looting that takes place afterward is known as the "Lincoln Fair". The citizens of Lincoln are loyal to Louis so Henry's forces sack the city. To the south, inhabitants of towns between Lincoln and London ambush and kill many of the French soldiers.
- June 6 – The 13-year-old King Henry I of Castile dies from the fall of a roof tile in Palencia, an event which his regent, Álvaro Núñez de Lara, attempts to conceal. He is succeeded by his sister Berengaria, who renounces the throne in favour of her son Ferdinand III, on August 31. The young king begins his reign (supported by his mother as adviser and regent) by a war against his father, King Alfonso IX of León, and the Castilian nobles.
- June – The 13-year-old Haakon IV becomes king of Norway, following the death of Inge II (Bårdsson) – this largely ends the civil war era in Norway. During his minority, Earl Skule Bårdsson becomes Haakon's regent.
- August 24 – Battle of Sandwich: An English fleet under Hubert de Burgh defeats the French armada (10 large ships and 70 supply ships) in the English Channel, near Sandwich. The French fleet is commanded by Eustace the Monk, a mercenary and pirate, who fights for both the French and English when it suits his needs. The French fleet is bringing more men and supplies to assist Prince Louis, in his quest to take the English throne. The English capture Eustace's flagship, and Eustace himself is (while offering 10,000 marks for ransom) beheaded.
- September 12 – Treaty of Kingston: The First Baron's War ends. After the defeat of the French fleet, Prince Louis is without hope of taking the English throne. William Marshal blockades London from the sea and land. At Lambeth Louis accepts peace terms. He waives his claim for the throne and promises to restore Normandy to Henry III but does not. The French and Scots are to leave England, and an amnesty is granted to the rebels.
- September 21 – Livonian Crusade: The Livonian Brothers of the Sword and allied Livs and Letts defeat the Estonian army in the Battle of St. Matthew's Day, and kill their leader Lembitu.
- October 18 – Reconquista: The city of Alcácer do Sal, located along the Sado River, is conquered from the Moors by troops of King Afonso II of Portugal.
- November – In the Kingdom of Castile, former regent and Castilian nobleman, Álvaro Núñez de Lara, is captured and forced to relinquish all his castles.
- unknown date – Stefan Nemanjić is elevated to be the first King of the Serbian lands by Pope Honorius III and crowned by Stefan's brother, Archimandrite Sava, in Žiča.

====== Asia ======
- The Mongol army under Muqali (or Mukhali) attacks Hebei Province, as well as Shandong Province and Shaanxi Province (controlled by the Jin Dynasty). He returns to Genghis Khan's camp in Mongolia, and receives the hereditary of prince with the title "Grand Preceptor of the Empire", a golden seal, and a white standard with nine tails and a black crescent in the middle. He is appointed as commander-in-chief of operations in North China.

=== 1218 ===
==== By place ====
====== Fifth Crusade ======
- May 24 – A Crusader expeditionary force, (some 30,000 men) under King John I of Jerusalem, embarks at Acre (supported by Frisian ships), and sails for Egypt. They arrive at the harbour of Damietta, on the right bank of the Nile, on May 27. Sultan Al-Adil, surprised by the invasion, recruits an army in Syria, while his son Al-Kamil marches an Egyptian force northwards from Cairo, and encamps at Al-Adiliya, a few miles south of Damietta.
- June 24 – Siege of Damietta: The Crusader army assaults the fortified city of Damietta, but they repeatedly fail. As a result, the Crusaders create a new type of naval siege weaponry, attributed by the German chronicler Oliver of Paderborn: two ships are bound together, with a siege tower and ladder constructed on top.
- August 24 – After a fierce fight, the Crusaders manage to establish themselves on the ramparts of Damietta, and capture the fort.
- September – Cardinal Pelagius arrives with reinforcements at the Crusader camp, and proceeds to challenge the command of John I, claiming that the Church holds greater authority than a secular leader. Meanwhile, the Crusaders spend time clearing out an old canal, so that their ships can surround Damietta. Pelagius also brings news that King Frederick II has promised to follow soon, with a German expeditionary force.
- Al-Kamil decides to offer the Crusaders a deal, Jerusalem in exchange for their departure from Egypt. John I favored accepting this offer but Pelagius refuses, unless it also includes Kerak Castle and other former castles of Jerusalem, to the east of the Jordan River. Al-Kamil refuses these strategically important sites, and Pelagius rejects the offer. This angers the Crusaders – who consider Jerusalem their important goal.
- October 9 – Al-Kamil conducts a surprise attack on the Crusader camp. Discovering their movements, John I and his retinue counter-attack and annihilates the Egyptian advance guard. On October 26, Al-Kamil attacks by using a bridge across the Nile, after a fierce onslaught the Egyptians are driven back into the river. The Crusaders strengthen their siege lines and receive French and English reinforcements at Damietta.
- November 29 – A storm, lasting for 3 days, floods the Crusader camp – devastating the Crusaders' supplies and transportation. To prevent a recurrence Pelagius orders a dyke to be constructed. After the camp is repaired, a serious epidemic strikes the Crusader forces. The victims suffer from a high fever, and at least a sixth of the soldiers die. During the severe winter, the survivors are left enfeebled and depressed.

====== Mongol Empire ======
- Spring – Genghis Khan dispatches a Mongolian army (some 20,000 cavalry) under Jebe, to deal with the Qara Khitai (or Western Liao) threat. Meanwhile, he sends Subutai with another army on a simultaneous campaign against the Merkits. Jebe defeats a force of 30,000 men led by Prince Kuchlug at the Khitan capital Balasagun. Kuchlug flees south to modern Afghanistan, but is captured by hunters – who hands him over to the Mongols. After Kuchlug is beheaded and paraded through the cities of his new domains, Genghis annexes the entire Khitai empire under Mongol rule.
- Jochi, eldest son of Genghis Khan, leads a successful campaign against the Kyrgyz. Meanwhile, Genghis sends a caravan with precious gifts to Muhammad II, ruler (shah) of the Khwarazmian Empire, hoping to establish trade relations. However, Inalchuq, Khwarazmian governor of Otrar, attacks the caravan, claiming that the caravan contains spies. Genghis then sends a second group of three ambassadors to Muhammad to demand the merchants be set free. Muhammad refuses, and the merchants along with one of the ambassadors are executed.

====== Britain ======
- March 11 – Treaty of Worcester: King Henry III writes to the Welsh ruler Llywelyn the Great and promises safe-conduct if they meet at Worcester. A peace treaty is signed, which confirms Llywelyn's ownership of Wales. In return, Llywelyn agrees to pay homage to Henry and to return those castles that he has captured during his recent conquests.

====== Europe ======
- June 25 – Siege of Toulouse: During a counter-assault, Simon de Montfort is killed by a stone from one of the defender's siege engines. The leadership of the Albigensian Crusade falls to Simon's son Amaury de Montfort, who lifts the siege a month later. Raymond VI is restored as count of Toulouse after a popular rebellion.
- July – In order to facilitate the movement of Reconquista, Pope Honorius III reverses Innocent III's earlier judgement, and declares King Ferdinand III (the Saint) legitimate heir to the Kingdom of León.
- Ivan Asen II becomes ruler (tsar) of the Bulgarian Empire, during his reign he will add Epirus, as well as parts of Albania and Macedonia to his realm.

====== Levant ======
- August 31 – Al-Adil I falls ill and dies at Damascus after an 18-year reign. He is succeeded in Syria by his eldest son Al-Mu'azzam and in Egypt by his younger son, Al-Kamil.

====== Asia ======
- Minamoto no Sanetomo becomes Udaijin ("Minister of the Right"), the third-highest post of the Japanese imperial court.
- King Jayavarman VII of the Khmer Empire rebuilds the city of Angkor Thom, including the Temple of Bayon.

==== By topic ====
====== Education ======
- August – King Alfonso IX of León grants a royal charter to the University of Salamanca.

====== Markets ======
- The city of Rheims emits the first recorded public life annuity in Medieval Europe. This type of instrument had been mostly issued by religious institutions. The emission by Rheims is the first evidence of a consolidation of public debt that is to become common in the Langue d'Oïl, the Low Countries and Germany.

====== Religion ======
- Pedro Nolasco founds the Order of the Blessed Virgin Mary of Mercy in Barcelona, Spain.

=== 1219 ===
==== By place ====
====== Fifth Crusade ======
- February – Pelagius orders the Crusader army to prepare an attack against the Egyptians but is unsuccessful because of the weather and strength of the defenders. Sultan Al-Kamil, in command of the Egyptian forces, is almost overthrown by a conspiracy in his entourage. He considers fleeing to the Ayyubid Emirate of Yemen, ruled by his son Al-Mas'ud Yusuf, but the arrival of his brother Al-Mu'azzam, with reinforcements from Syria, ends the conspiracy. On hearing the news that Al-Kamil and his army is retreating to Cairo, the Crusaders march to Al-Adiliya. After driving back an assault from the garrison of Damietta they occupy the town on February 5.
- April – The Crusaders surround Damietta, with the Italian forces to the north, Knights Templar and Knights Hospitaller to the east – and King John I of Jerusalem with his French and Pisan troops to the south. The Frisians and German troops occupy the old camp across the Nile. A new wave of Crusader reinforcements from Cyprus arrive led by Walter III of Caesarea. Meanwhile, Al-Mu'azzam decides to dismantle the fortifications at Mount Tabor and other defensive positions, as well as Jerusalem itself, in order to deny their protection should the Crusaders prevail there. Some fanatics wish to destroy the Holy Sepulchre, but this is refused by Al-Mu'azzam.
- April 7 – Al-Muzaffar II, Ayyubid ruler of Hama, arrives Egypt with Syrian reinforcements, leading multiple attacks on the Crusader camp at Al-Adiliya, with little impact. In the meantime, new Crusader forces bring badly needed supplies. Egyptian attacks continue through May, with Crusader counter-attacks utilizing a Lombard device known as a carroccio, confounding the defenders.
- July 8 – Pelagius begins multiple attacks at Damietta, using Pisan and Venetian troops. Each time they are repelled by the defenders, using Greek fire. A counter-offensive led by Al-Kamil on the Templar camp is repulsed on July 31 by their new Grand Master Peire de Montagut, supported by the Teutonic Knights – where the Crusaders reform and pursue the enemy outside the gates.
- August 29 – The Crusaders attack the Egyptian camp in the Battle of Faraskur and the Muslims pretend a feigned retreat to Mansoura. John I advises to camp overnight, because there is no fresh water in the region between the Nile and Lake Manzalah. Al-Kamil decides to halt the retreat and turns his forces to deliver a smashing attack upon the disorganized Crusaders, losing some 4,300 men.
- September – Francis of Assisi, an Italian preacher, arrives in the Crusader camp and introduces Catholicism in Egypt. He seeks permission from Pelagius to visit Al-Kamil. After an initial refusal, he sends Francis under a flag of truce to Faraskur. Al-Kamil receives him courteously and offers him many gifts. He accepts a death-bed baptism, and is escorted back to the Crusader camp.
- October – Al-Kamil sends two captive knights as envoys, to renew his former offers of an armistice. If the Crusaders evacuate Egypt, he will return the True Cross (lost in the Battle of Hattin) and they can have Jerusalem, all central Palestine and Galilee. John I advised its acceptance, along with the nobles from England, France and Germany. Pelagius again refuses the peace terms.
- November 5 – Siege of Damietta: The Crusaders enter Damietta and find it abandoned. Seeing the Crusader standards flying from the towers, Al-Kamil hastily abandons his camp at Faraskur and withdraws to Mansoura. Survivors in the city are either sent into slavery or held as hostages to trade for Christian prisoners. On November 23, the Crusader army captures the city of Tinnis.

====== Mongol Empire ======
- Winter – Genghis Khan sends a Mongol army (some 20,000 men) under his eldest son Jochi and Jebe to cross the Tian Shan mountains ("Heavenly Mountains") to ravage the fertile Fergana Valley, in the eastern part of the Khwarezm Empire. The Mongols suffer many losses but slip through the defensive lines and confuse the enemy who thinks this is Genghis' main force. Muhammad II dispatches his elite cavalry reserve to protect the fertile regions with force. Meanwhile, another Mongol army under his second and third sons Chagatai and Ögedei passes through the Dzungarian Gate, and immediately start laying siege to the border city of Otrar.
- Mongol forces under Chagatai and Ögedei capture Otrar after a 5-month siege. The city becomes the first of many settlements to have its entire population slain or enslaved before it is razed to the ground. Inalchuq, the Khwarezmian governor of Otrar, is captured and executed by pouring molten silver into his eyes and ears – an unlikely and unnecessarily expensive end.
- By letter, Genghis Khan summons Qiu Chuji (Master Changchun) to visit him, to advise him on the medicine of immortality (the Philosopher's Stone).

====== Europe ======
- June 15 – Livonian Crusade: Danish Crusaders led by King King Valdemar II (the Victorious), conquer Tallinn in the Battle of Lyndanisse. What is to become the flag of Denmark (Dannebrog) allegedly falls from the sky during that battle. Their stronghold in Tallinn will help the Danes conquer the entirety of Danish Estonia.
- Twenty-four Lithuanian dukes and nobles purportedly sign a peace treaty with Halych-Volhynia, stating a common cause against invading Christian Crusaders.

====== Asia ======
- May 2 – King Leo II (or Levon) of Armenian Cilicia dies, leaving only two daughters. The elder, Stephanie, is the wife of John I; the younger, Isabella, daughter of Princess Sibylla of Cyprus and Jerusalem, is three years old. Leo has promised the succession to his nephew, Raymond-Roupen of Antioch, but on his death-bed he names Isabella as his heir.

==== By topic ====
====== Technology ======
- The windmill is first introduced to China, with the travels of Yelü Chucai to Transoxiana.
- Mina'i ware pottery production in Persia ceases as a result of the Mongol conquests.

== Births ==
1210

- May 5 – Afonso III (the Boulonnais), king of Portugal (d. 1279)
- June 24 – Floris IV, Count of Holland, Dutch nobleman and knight (d. 1234)
- July 22 – Joan of England, queen of Scotland (d. 1238)
- unknown date – Alice of Montferrat, queen consort of Cyprus (d. 1233)

1211

- January 20 – Agnes of Prague, Bohemian abbess (d. 1282)
- April 25 – Frederick II, duke of Austria and Styria (d. 1246)
- September 22 – Ibn Khallikan, Barmakid historian (d. 1282)
- December 3 – Francesco Lippi, Italian nobleman (d. 1291)
- Ajall Shams al-Din Omar, Khwarezmian governor (d. 1279)
- Casimir I of Kuyavia, Polish nobleman and knight (d. 1267)
- Eleanor of Portugal, queen consort of Denmark (d. 1231)
- Henry VII, king of Germany (Rex Romanorum) (d. 1242)
- Hugh Bigod, English nobleman and Justiciar (d. 1266)
- John I, Lord of Mecklenburg ("the Theologian"), German nobleman (d. 1264)
- Muhammad III, ruler of the Nizari Ismaili State (d. 1255)
- Prijezda I, Bosnian nobleman (Ban) and knight (d. 1287)
- Shinnyo, Japanese Buddhist nun and writer (d. 1282)
- William of Villehardouin, prince of Achaea (d. 1278)

1212

- March 22 – Go-Horikawa, emperor of Japan (d. 1234)
- May 6 – Constance, margravine of Meissen (d. 1243)
- July 9 – Muiz ud-Din Bahram, Indian ruler (d. 1242)
- Abu al-Hasan al-Shushtari, Andalusian poet (d. 1269)
- Farinata degli Uberti, Italian military leader (d. 1264)
- Ibn Sahl of Seville, Almohad poet and writer (d. 1251)
- Isabella II, queen and regent of Jerusalem (d. 1228)
- Malatesta da Verucchio, Italian nobleman (d. 1312)
- Maria of Chernigov, Kievan Rus' princess (d. 1271)
- Yolande of Dreux, French noblewoman (d. 1248)
- Zita (or Sitha), Italian maid and saint (d. 1272)

1213

- March 9 – Hugh IV, Duke of Burgundy, French crusader (d. 1271)
- June 10 – Fakhr-al-Din Iraqi, Persian philosopher and Sufi mystic
- Ibn al-Nafis, polymath (d. 1288)
- Hethum I, King of Armenia, ruler of the Armenian Kingdom of Cilicia (d. 1270)

1214

- April 25 – Louis IX ("the Saint"), king of France (d. 1270)
- July 29 – Sturla Þórðarson, Icelandic chieftain (d. 1284)
- Alberto da Bergamo, Italian Dominican tertiary (d. 1279)
- Al-Qurtubi, Moorish scholar, jurist and writer (d. 1273)
- Isabella of England, Holy Roman Empress (d. 1241)
- Ottaviano degli Ubaldini, Italian cardinal (d. 1273)
- Ugolino della Gherardesca, Italian nobleman (approximate date) (d. 1289)

1215

- September 23 – Kublai Khan, Mongol emperor (d. 1294)
- Agnes of Merania, German noblewoman (d. 1263)
- Beatrice d'Este, queen consort of Hungary (d. 1245)
- Catherine Sunesdotter, queen of Sweden (d. 1252)
- Celestine V, pope of the Catholic Church (d. 1296)
- David VII (or David Ulugh), king of Georgia (d. 1270)
- Eleanor of England, countess of Leicester (d. 1275)
- Henry II, prince of Anhalt-Aschersleben (d. 1266)
- Henry III, Margrave of Meissen ("the Illustrious"), German nobleman (d. 1288)
- Ibn Kammuna, Arab Jewish philosopher (d. 1284)
- John I, French nobleman and knight (d. 1249)
- John XXI, pope of the Catholic Church (d. 1277)
- John of Ibelin, count of Jaffa and Ascalon (d. 1266)
- Maria of Antioch-Armenia, lady of Toron (d. 1257)
- Mécia Lopes de Haro, queen of Portugal (d. 1270)
- Otto III, Margrave of Brandenburg ("the Pious"), German nobleman (d. 1267)
- Robert Kilwardby, archbishop of Canterbury (d. 1279)
- Roger de Leybourne, English landowner (d. 1271)

1216

- September 25 – Robert I, French nobleman (d. 1250)
- Al-Mahdi Ahmad bin al-Husayn, Arab ruler (d. 1258)
- Bernard Ayglerius (or Aygler), French cardinal (d. 1282)
- Contardo of Este, Italian nobleman and knight (d. 1249)
- Eric IV (the Plowpenny), king of Denmark (d. 1250)
- Eric XI (the Lisp and Lame), king of Sweden (d. 1250)
- Henry V (the Great), count of Luxembourg (d. 1281)
- Liu Bingzhong (or Liu kan), Chinese adviser (d. 1274)
- Nijō Yoshizane, Japanese nobleman (kugyō) (d. 1270)
- Safi al-Din al-Urmawi, Persian musician (d. 1294)
- Stephen Longespée, English seneschal (d. 1260)
- Zahed Gilani, Arab Sufi leader and writer (d. 1301)

1217

- May 3 – Henry I (the Fat), king of Cyprus (d. 1253)
- August 19 – Ninshō, Japanese priest (d. 1303)
- Baldwin II of Courtenay, Latin emperor (d. 1273)
- Baldwin de Redvers, English nobleman (d. 1245)
- Boniface of Savoy, English archbishop (d. 1270)
- Ferdinand, Portuguese prince (infante) (d. 1246)
- George Akropolites, Byzantine statesman (d. 1282)
- Guillaume III, French nobleman and knight (d. 1288)
- Guo Kan, Chinese general and governor (d. 1277)
- Henry of Antioch, co-ruler of Jerusalem (d. 1276)
- Henry of Ghent, Flemish philosopher (d. 1293)
- Ibn Sab'in, Andalusian Sufi philosopher (d. 1271)
- Izz al-Din ibn Shaddad, Arab historian (d. 1285)
- John I (the Red), English nobleman (d. 1286)
- Kangan Giin, Japanese Zen Master (d. 1300)

1218

- February 12 – Kujō Yoritsune, Japanese shōgun (d. 1256)
- May 1
  - John I, count of Hainaut (d. 1257)
  - Rudolf I, king of Germany (d. 1291)
- October 30 – Chūkyō, emperor of Japan (d. 1234)
- Abel (Valdemarsen), king of Denmark (d. 1252)
- Bernhard I, prince of Anhalt-Bernburg (d. 1287)
- Fujiwara no Chōshi, Japanese empress (d. 1275)
- Irene Komnene, Byzantine noblewoman (d. 1284)
- Jaromar II, German prince and co-ruler (d. 1260)
- Lý Chiêu Hoàng, empress of Vietnam (d. 1278)
- Marie de Coucy, queen consort of Scotland (d. 1285)
- Maurice de Berkeley, English nobleman (d. 1281)
- Peter of Courtenay, French nobleman (d. 1249)
- Thomas de Cantilupe, English bishop (d. 1282)
- Yolande of Brittany, French noblewoman (d. 1272)

1219

- February 18 – Tettsū Gikai, Japanese Zen Master (d. 1309)
- April 5 – Wonjong of Goryeo, Korean ruler (d. 1274)
- Abu al-Abbas al-Mursi, Moorish Sufi leader (d. 1287)
- Ariq Böke (or Buka), Mongol ruler (khagan) (d. 1266)
- Baldwin of Avesnes, French nobleman (d. 1295)
- Christopher I (or Christoffer), king of Denmark (d. 1259)
- Umiliana de' Cerchi, Italian noblewoman (d. 1246)
- William Devereux, English nobleman (d. 1265)

== Deaths ==
1210

- March 29 – Fakhr al-Din al-Razi, Persian polymath (b. 1150)
- May 6 – Conrad II, Margrave of Lusatia, German nobleman and knight (b. 1159)
- May 13 – Noriko (or Hanshi), Japanese empress (b. 1177)
- July 17 – Sverker II (the Younger), king of Sweden
- October 16 – Matilda of Boulogne, duchess of Brabant
- November 14 – Qutb al-Din Aibak, Indian ruler (b. 1150)
- November 30 – Florence of Holland, Scottish bishop
- December 14 – Soffredo, Italian cardinal and patriarch
- Aonghus mac Somhairle, Norse-Gaelic chieftain
- Gottfried von Strassburg, German poet and writer
- Halldóra Eyjólfsdóttir, Icelandic nun and abbess
- Jean Bodel, French poet and writer (b. 1165)
- Jinul (or Chinul), Korean Zen Master (b. 1158)
- Lu You, Chinese historian, poet and writer (b. 1125)
- Majd ad-Dīn Ibn Athir, Zangid historian (b. 1149)
- Maud de Braose, English noblewoman (b. 1155)
- Muhammad II, ruler of the Alamut state (b. 1148)
- Praepositinus, Italian philosopher and theologian
- Risteárd de Tiúit, Norman warrior and nobleman
- Robert of Braybrooke, English landowner (b. 1168)
- William FitzAlan, Norman nobleman and knight

1211

- February 2 – Adelaide of Meissen, duchess of Bohemia
- March 14 – Pietro Gallocia (or Galluzzi), Italian cardinal
- March 26 – Sancho I ("the Populator"), king of Portugal (b. 1154)
- May 16 – Mieszko IV Tanglefoot, duke of Poland (b. 1130)
- June 9 – Andrew II, Baron of Vitré, French nobleman and knight (b. 1150)
- June 17 – Kaykhusraw I, ruler of the Sultanate of Rum
- August 9 – William de Braose, 4th Lord of Bramber, Norman nobleman
- August 18 – Narapatisithu, ruler of the Pagan Kingdom (Burma) (b. 1150)
- October 14 – Ferdinand of Castile, Spanish prince (b. 1189)
- November 29 – Páll Jónsson, Icelandic bishop (b. 1155)
- December 8 – Adelaide of Poland, Polish princess
- December 14 – Shōshi, Japanese empress (b. 1195)
- Abu Musa al-Jazuli, Almohad philologian (b. 1146)
- Alexios III Angelos, Byzantine emperor (b. 1153)
- Euphrosyne Doukaina Kamatera, Byzantine empress
- Hugh I, Sardinian ruler (Judge of Arborea) (b. 1178)
- Peter of Blois, French cleric and diplomat (b. 1130)
- Robert of Thornham, English seneschal and knight
- Roger de Lacy (le Constable), English nobleman (b. 1170)
- Samson of Tottington, English monk and abbot (b. 1135)
- Shizuka Gozen, Japanese court dancer (b. 1165)
- Svyatoslav III Igorevich, Kievan prince (b. 1176)
- Thomas Morosini, Latin patriarch of Constantinople
- Tsangpa Gyare, Tibetan Buddhist leader (b. 1161)
- Urraca of Portugal, queen consort of León (b. 1148)
- Xiang Zong, Chinese emperor of Western Xia (b. 1170)

1212

- February 2 – Bernhard III, German nobleman (b. 1140)
- February 29 – Hōnen, Japanese Buddhist reformer (b. 1133)
- April 6 – Bertram of Metz (or Berthold), German bishop
- April 15 – Vsevolod III, Grand Prince of Kiev (b. 1154)
- May 24 – Dagmar of Bohemia, queen of Denmark
- July 15 – John I (or Johann), German archbishop
- July 16 – William de Brus, Scottish lord of Annandale
- August 11 – Beatrice, Holy Roman Empress (b. 1198)
- August 26 – Michael IV, patriarch of Constantinople
- September 19 – Henry fitz Ailwin, Lord Mayor of London
- October 9 – Philip I of Namur ("the Noble"), Flemish nobleman
- October 25 – John Comyn, English archbishop (b. 1150)
- November 4 – Felix of Valois, French hermit (b. 1127)
- November – Azzo VI of Este (or Azzolino), Italian nobleman (b. 1170)
- December 5 – Dirk van Are, bishop and lord of Utrecht
- December 12 – Geoffrey, Anglo-Norman archbishop of York and Chancellor of England (b. 1152)
- December 14 – Matilda de Bailleul, Flemish abbess
- Abu al-Abbas al-Jarawi, Moroccan poet and writer
- Anna Komnene Angelina, Nicene empress (b. 1176)
- Baldwin of Béthune, French nobleman and knight
- David Komnenos, emperor of Trebizond (b. 1184)
- Ghiyath al-Din Mahmud, ruler of the Ghurid Empire
- Guillem de Cabestany, Spanish troubadour (b. 1162)
- Henry de Longchamp, English High Sheriff (b. 1150)
- Maria of Montferrat, queen of Jerusalem (b. 1192)
- Peter de Preaux, Norman nobleman and knight
- Robert of Auxerre, French chronicler and writer
- Robert of Shrewsbury, English cleric and bishop
- Walter of Montbéliard, constable of Jerusalem

1213

- January 18 – Queen Tamar of Georgia (b. c. 1160)
- April 13 – Guy of Thouars, regent of Brittany
- April 21 – Maria of Montpellier, Lady of Montpellier, Queen of Aragon (b. 1182)
- September 12 – King Peter II of Aragon (killed in battle) (b. 1174)
- September 28 – Gertrude of Merania, queen consort regent of Hungary (murdered) (b. 1185)
- October 10 – Frederick II, Duke of Lorraine
- October 14 – Geoffrey Fitz Peter, 1st Earl of Essex
- Sharafeddin Tusi, Persian mathematician (b. 1135)

1214

- January 25 – Taira no Tokuko, Japanese empress (b. 1155)
- February 13 – Theobald I, Count of Bar (or Thibauld), French nobleman
- April 16 or 26 – Henry VI, Count Palatine of the Rhine ("the Younger"), German nobleman (b. 1196)
- April 21 – John of Ford, English Cistercian prior and abbot
- June 24 – Gilbert Glanvill (or Glanville), bishop of Rochester
- July 27 – Stephen Longchamp, Norman nobleman and knight
- August 18 – Pedro Fernández de Castro, Spanish nobleman
- August 30 – Peter of Capua the Elder, Italian cardinal and papal legate
- September 14 – Albert of Vercelli, Latin patriarch of Jerusalem
- September 16 – Diego López II de Haro, Spanish nobleman (b. 1152)
- October 5 – Alfonso VIII ("the Noble"), king of Castile (b. 1155)
- October 18 – John de Gray (or de Grey), bishop of Norwich
- October 31 – Eleanor of England, queen of Castile (b. 1161)
- December 4 – William the Lion, king of Scotland (b. 1142)
- December 8 – Sasaki Takatsuna, Japanese samurai (b. 1160)
- Ala al-Din Atsiz, ruler of the Ghurid Sultanate (b. 1159)
- Aubrey de Vere, English nobleman and knight (b. 1163)
- Filocalo Navigajoso, Latin ruler (megadux) of Lemnos
- Neophytos of Cyprus, Cypriot priest and hermit (b. 1134)
- Robert fitzRoger, English Sheriff of Norfolk and Suffolk
- William I of Cagliari, ruler (judge) of Sardinia (b. 1160)

1215

- February 3 (or February 4) – Eustace, bishop of Ely
- February 6 – Hōjō Tokimasa, Japanese nobleman (b. 1138)
- June 9 – Manegold of Berg, German abbot and bishop
- August 1 – Eisai, Japanese Buddhist priest (b. 1141)
- September 1 – Otto I, bishop of Utrecht (b. 1194)
- November 5 – Philip de Valognes, Norman nobleman
- November 17 – Giles de Braose, bishop of Hereford
- December 21 – Ali ibn Muhammad ibn al-Walid, Arab theologian
- Ali ibn Abi Bakr al-Harawi, Persian traveller and explorer
- Bertran de Born, French nobleman, poet and troubadour
- Esclarmonde of Foix, French noblewoman and Cathar
- Giraut de Bornelh (or de Borneil), French troubadour
- Jacopino della Scala, Italian merchant and politician
- Manfred II (del Vasto), marquis of Saluzzo (b. 1140)
- Sicard of Cremona, Italian bishop and writer (b. 1155)
- Theodore Apsevdis, Byzantine painter (b. 1150)

1216

- January 18 – Guy II of Dampierre, French nobleman
- January 31 – Theodore II, patriarch of Constantinople
- February 23 – Geoffrey de Mandeville, English nobleman
- April 10 – Eric X (Knutsson), king of Sweden (b. 1180)
- April 27 – Sukeko, Japanese princess and empress
- June 11 – Henry of Flanders, Latin emperor (b. 1178)
- July 16 – Innocent III, pope of the Catholic Church
- September 2 – Peter II (of Ivrea), patriarch of Antioch
- October 8 – Az-Zahir Ghazi, Ayyubid ruler of Aleppo
- October 19 – John (Lackland), king of England (b. 1166)
- Eustace de Vesci, English nobleman and knight (b. 1169)
- Fujiwara no Ariie, Japanese nobleman and poet (b. 1155)
- Ida of Boulogne, French noblewoman and ruler (b. 1160)
- Jetsun Dragpa Gyaltsen, Tibetan spiritual leader (b. 1147)
- Kamo no Chōmei, Japanese poet and essayist (b. 1155)

1217

- February 9 – Raynald of Nocera, Italian monk and bishop (b. 1150)
- February 22 – Judah ben Samuel of Regensburg, German Jewish rabbi (b. 1150)
- March 30 – Fujiwara no Kanefusa, Japanese nobleman (b. 1153)
- March 31 – Alexander Neckam, English abbot (b. 1157)
- April 21 – Al-Mansur Abdallah, Yemeni imam (b. 1166)
- April 23 – Inge Bårdsson, king of Norway (b. 1185)
- April 25 – Hermann I, Landgrave of Thuringia (or III), German nobleman (b. 1155)
- May 20 – Thomas, Count of Perche, French nobleman (b. 1195)
- June 6 – Henry I, king of Castile and Toledo (b. 1204)
- July 22 – Hadmar II of Kuenring, German nobleman
- August 24 – Eustace the Monk, French mercenary
- September 8 – Robert I, Count of Alençon, French nobleman and knight
- September 10 – William de Redvers, 5th Earl of Devon, English nobleman
- September 21
  - Caupo of Turaida, king of Livonia
  - Lembitu, Estonian military leader
- September 29 – Jean de Montmirail, French monk (b. 1165)
- October 14 – Isabella, English noblewoman, sometime queen consort of England (b. c. 1163)
- November 4 – Philip of Dreux, French bishop (b. 1158)
- November 29 – Ibn Jubayr, Andalusian traveller (b. 1145)
- December 29 – Gyōi, Japanese monk and poet (b. 1177)
- Abd al-Haqq I, ruler of the Marinid Sultanate (b. 1147)
- Jigten Sumgön, founder of the Drikung Kagyu (b. 1143)
- John of Ferentino, Italian notary and cardinal (b. 1150)
- Maria Komnene, queen consort of Jerusalem (b. 1154)
- Nijōin no Sanuki, Japanese noblewoman (b. 1141)
- Niketas Choniates, Byzantine historian (b. 1155)
- Philip Simonsson, Norwegian nobleman (b. 1185)
- Reginald of Bar (or de Mouçon), French bishop
- Richard de Clare, 3rd Earl of Hertford, Anglo-Norman nobleman and knight
- Simon of Pattishall (or Pateshull), English judge
- Torchitorio IV of Cagliari, Sardinian judge (b. 1190)
- Wang Chuyi, Chinese Daoist philosopher (b. 1142)
- William I, Count of Sancerre, French nobleman and knight (b. 1176)
- William de Lanvallei, English landowner and knight

1218

- January 10 – Hugh I (or Hugo), king of Cyprus (b. 1195)
- January 23 – Wolfger von Erla, German bishop (b. 1140)
- February 2 – Konstantin of Rostov, Kievan Grand Prince
- February 12 – Alice of Courtenay, French noblewoman
- February 18 – Berthold V, German nobleman (b. 1160)
- May 6 – Theresa of Portugal, countess of Flanders
- May 19 – Otto IV, Holy Roman Emperor (b. 1175)
- June 25 – Simon de Montfort, French nobleman
- July 6 – Odo III (or Eudes), duke of Burgundy (b. 1166)
- August 7 – Adolf VI (or III), German nobleman (b. 1175)
- August 26 – William of Chartres (Templar), French Grand Master
- August 31 – Al-Adil I, Ayyubid general and sultan (b. 1145)
- September 24 – Robert of Knaresborough, English hermit
- November 12 – Henry de Abergavenny, English bishop
- December 28 – Robert II, French nobleman (b. 1154)
- Adelaide of Guelders, countess of Holland (b. 1182)
- Álvara Núñez de Lara, Castilian nobleman (b. 1170)
- Comita III of Torres, Sardinian ruler (judge) (b. 1160)
- Federico Wanga (or Vanga), prince-bishop of Trent
- Franca Piacenza, Italian nun and abbess (b. 1170)
- Geoffrey de Luterel, English landowner and knight
- Giolla Ernain Ó Martain, Irish poet and Chief Ollam
- Henry de Abergavenny, English abbot and bishop
- Jayavarman VII, ruler of the Khmer Empire (b. 1122)
- Peter II, Hungarian prelate, chancellor and bishop
- Theobald VI of Blois, French nobleman and knight
- Umadevi, Indian queen and general (b. 1150)
- William I of Baux, French nobleman (b. 1155)

1219

- February 6 – Robert of Courçon, English cardinal (b. 1160)
- February 13 – Minamoto no Sanetomo, Japanese shogun (b. 1192)
- March 17 – Rudolph I, Count Palatine of Tübingen (b. 1160)
- March 22 – Henryk Kietlicz, archbishop of Gniezno (b. 1150)
- April 30 – Aldebrandus, bishop of Fossombrone (b. 1119)
- May 1 – Raoul I of Lusignan, French nobleman and knight
- May 2 – Leo II (or Levon), king of Armenian Cilicia (b. 1150)
- May 14 – William Marshal, 1st Earl of Pembroke (b. 1146)
- June 15 – Theoderich von Treyden, German missionary
- June 17 – David of Scotland, Scottish nobleman (b 1152)
- October 29 – Ch'oe Ch'ung-hŏn, Korean ruler (b. 1149)
- November 3 – Saer de Quincy, English nobleman (b. 1170)
- November 5 – Hugh IX (the Brown), French nobleman
- December 17 – Conon de Béthune, French knight (b. 1150)
- Casimir II (or Kasimir), duke of Pomerania-Demmin (b. 1180)
- Gerard de Furnival, Norman nobleman and knight (b. 1175)
- Henry de Grey, English nobleman and courtier (b. 1155)
- Inalchuq (or Inalchuk), Khwarezmian governor of Otrar
- John of Béthune, French nobleman and bishop (b. 1160)
- John de Courcy, English nobleman and knight (b. 1150)
- Peter II of Courtenay, Latin emperor of Constantinople
- Richalmus, German Cistercian abbot and biographer
- Scholastique of Champagne, French noblewoman (b. 1172)
- Walter III of Châtillon, French nobleman and knight
- William de Valognes, Scoto-Norman Lord Chamberlain
- Yolanda of Flanders, Latin empress and regent (b. 1175)
