= 1218 =

1218 in various calendars
- Gregorian calendar: 1218; MCCXVIII
- Ab urbe condita: 1971
- Armenian calendar: 667; ԹՎ ՈԿԷ
- Assyrian calendar: 5968
- Balinese saka calendar: 1139–1140
- Bengali calendar: 624–625
- Berber calendar: 2168
- English Regnal year: 2 Hen. 3 – 3 Hen. 3
- Buddhist calendar: 1762
- Burmese calendar: 580
- Byzantine calendar: 6726–6727
- Chinese calendar: 丁丑年 (Fire Ox); 3915 or 3708 — to — 戊寅年 (Earth Tiger); 3916 or 3709
- Coptic calendar: 934–935
- Discordian calendar: 2384
- Ethiopian calendar: 1210–1211
- Hebrew calendar: 4978–4979
- Hindu calendars
- Vikram Samvat: 1274–1275
- Shaka Samvat: 1139–1140
- Kali Yuga: 4318–4319
- Holocene calendar: 11218
- Igbo calendar: 218–219
- Iranian calendar: 596–597
- Islamic calendar: 614–615
- Japanese calendar: Kenpō 6 (建保６年)
- Javanese calendar: 1126–1127
- Julian calendar: 1218; MCCXVIII
- Korean calendar: 3551
- Minguo calendar: 694 before ROC 民前694年
- Nanakshahi calendar: −250
- Thai solar calendar: 1760–1761
- Tibetan calendar: མེ་མོ་གླང་ལོ་ (female Fire-Ox); 1344 or 963 or 191 — to — ས་ཕོ་སྟག་ལོ་ (male Earth-Tiger); 1345 or 964 or 192

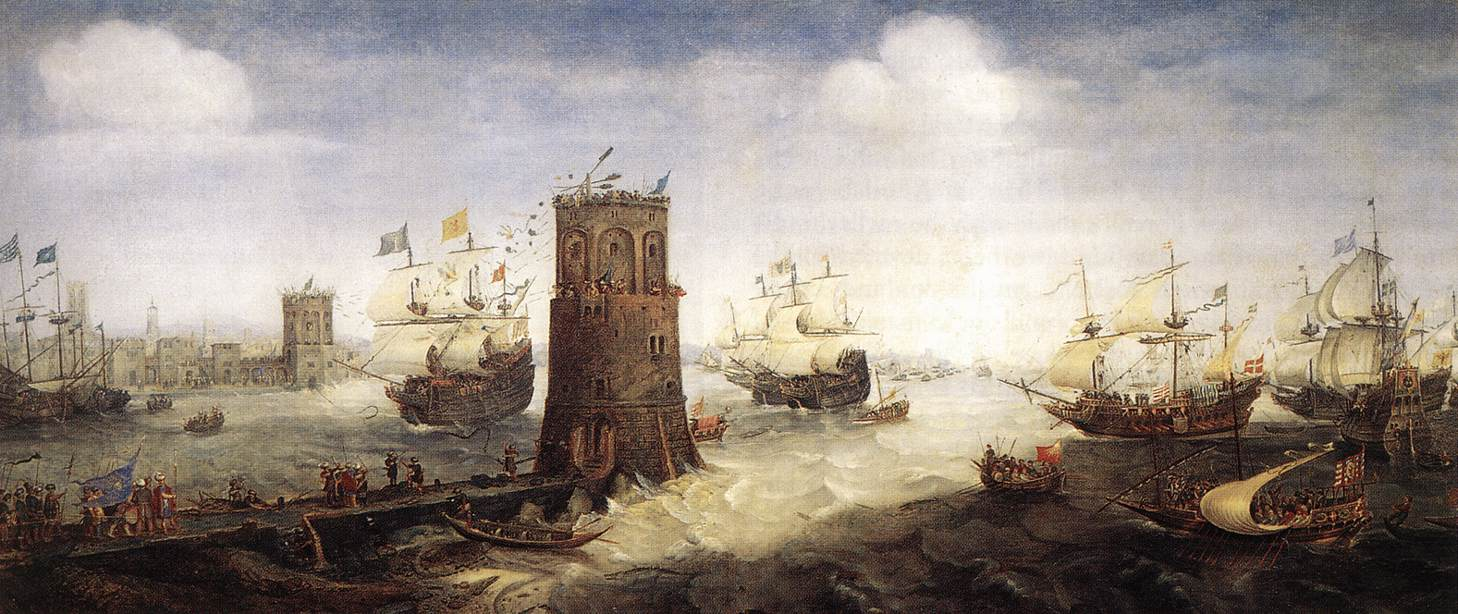
Crusaders attack the tower of Damietta, by Cornelis Claesz van Wieringen (1627)

Year 1218 (MCCXVIII) was a common year starting on Monday of the Julian calendar.

== Events ==
=== By place ===
==== Fifth Crusade ====
- May 24 – A Crusader expeditionary force, (some 30,000 men) under King John I of Jerusalem, embarks at Acre (supported by Frisian ships), and sails for Egypt. They arrive at the harbour of Damietta, on the right bank of the Nile, on May 27. Sultan Al-Adil, surprised by the invasion, recruits an army in Syria, while his son Al-Kamil marches an Egyptian force northwards from Cairo, and encamps at Al-Adiliya, a few miles south of Damietta.
- June 24 – Siege of Damietta: The Crusader army assaults the fortified city of Damietta, but they repeatedly fail. As a result, the Crusaders create a new type of naval siege weaponry, attributed by the German chronicler Oliver of Paderborn: two ships are bound together, with a siege tower and ladder constructed on top.
- August 24 – After a fierce fight, the Crusaders manage to establish themselves on the ramparts of Damietta, and capture the fort.
- September – Cardinal Pelagius arrives with reinforcements at the Crusader camp, and proceeds to challenge the command of John I, claiming that the Church holds greater authority than a secular leader. Meanwhile, the Crusaders spend time clearing out an old canal, so that their ships can surround Damietta. Pelagius also brings news that King Frederick II has promised to follow soon, with a German expeditionary force.
- Al-Kamil decides to offer the Crusaders a deal, Jerusalem in exchange for their departure from Egypt. John I favored accepting this offer but Pelagius refuses, unless it also includes Kerak Castle and other former castles of Jerusalem, to the east of the Jordan River. Al-Kamil refuses these strategically important sites, and Pelagius rejects the offer. This angers the Crusaders – who consider Jerusalem their important goal.
- October 9 – Al-Kamil conducts a surprise attack on the Crusader camp. Discovering their movements, John I and his retinue counter-attack and annihilates the Egyptian advance guard. On October 26, Al-Kamil attacks by using a bridge across the Nile, after a fierce onslaught the Egyptians are driven back into the river. The Crusaders strengthen their siege lines and receive French and English reinforcements at Damietta.
- November 29 – A storm, lasting for 3 days, floods the Crusader camp – devastating the Crusaders' supplies and transportation. To prevent a recurrence Pelagius orders a dyke to be constructed. After the camp is repaired, a serious epidemic strikes the Crusader forces. The victims suffer from a high fever, and at least a sixth of the soldiers die. During the severe winter, the survivors are left enfeebled and depressed.

==== Mongol Empire ====
- Spring – Genghis Khan dispatches a Mongolian army (some 20,000 cavalry) under Jebe, to deal with the Qara Khitai (or Western Liao) threat. Meanwhile, he sends Subutai with another army on a simultaneous campaign against the Merkits. Jebe defeats a force of 30,000 men led by Prince Kuchlug at the Khitan capital Balasagun. Kuchlug flees south to modern Afghanistan, but is captured by hunters – who hands him over to the Mongols. After Kuchlug is beheaded and paraded through the cities of his new domains, Genghis annexes the entire Khitai empire under Mongol rule.
- Jochi, eldest son of Genghis Khan, leads a successful campaign against the Kyrgyz. Meanwhile, Genghis sends a caravan with precious gifts to Muhammad II, ruler (shah) of the Khwarazmian Empire, hoping to establish trade relations. However, Inalchuq, Khwarazmian governor of Otrar, attacks the caravan, claiming that the caravan contains spies. Genghis then sends a second group of three ambassadors to Muhammad to demand the merchants be set free. Muhammad refuses, and the merchants along with one of the ambassadors are executed.

==== Britain ====
- March 11 – Treaty of Worcester: King Henry III writes to the Welsh ruler Llywelyn the Great and promises safe-conduct if they meet at Worcester. A peace treaty is signed, which confirms Llywelyn's ownership of Wales. In return, Llywelyn agrees to pay homage to Henry and to return those castles that he has captured during his recent conquests.

==== Europe ====
- June 25 – Siege of Toulouse: During a counter-assault, Simon de Montfort is killed by a stone from one of the defender's siege engines. The leadership of the Albigensian Crusade falls to Simon's son Amaury de Montfort, who lifts the siege a month later. Raymond VI is restored as count of Toulouse after a popular rebellion.
- July – In order to facilitate the movement of Reconquista, Pope Honorius III reverses Innocent III's earlier judgement, and declares King Ferdinand III (the Saint) legitimate heir to the Kingdom of León.
- Ivan Asen II becomes ruler (tsar) of the Bulgarian Empire, during his reign he will add Epirus, as well as parts of Albania and Macedonia to his realm.

==== Levant ====
- August 31 – Al-Adil I falls ill and dies at Damascus after an 18-year reign. He is succeeded in Syria by his eldest son Al-Mu'azzam and in Egypt by his younger son, Al-Kamil.

==== Asia ====
- Minamoto no Sanetomo becomes Udaijin ("Minister of the Right"), the third-highest post of the Japanese imperial court.
- King Jayavarman VII of the Khmer Empire rebuilds the city of Angkor Thom, including the Temple of Bayon.

=== By topic ===
==== Education ====
- August – King Alfonso IX of León grants a royal charter to the University of Salamanca.

==== Markets ====
- The city of Rheims emits the first recorded public life annuity in Medieval Europe. This type of instrument had been mostly issued by religious institutions. The emission by Rheims is the first evidence of a consolidation of public debt that is to become common in the Langue d'Oïl, the Low Countries and Germany.

==== Religion ====
- Pedro Nolasco founds the Order of the Blessed Virgin Mary of Mercy in Barcelona, Spain.

== Births ==
- February 12 – Kujō Yoritsune, Japanese shōgun (d. 1256)
- May 1
  - John I, count of Hainaut (d. 1257)
  - Rudolf I, king of Germany (d. 1291)
- October 30 – Chūkyō, emperor of Japan (d. 1234)
- Abel (Valdemarsen), king of Denmark (d. 1252)
- Bernhard I, prince of Anhalt-Bernburg (d. 1287)
- Fujiwara no Chōshi, Japanese empress (d. 1275)
- Irene Komnene, Byzantine noblewoman (d. 1284)
- Jaromar II, German prince and co-ruler (d. 1260)
- Lý Chiêu Hoàng, empress of Vietnam (d. 1278)
- Marie de Coucy, queen consort of Scotland (d. 1285)
- Maurice de Berkeley, English nobleman (d. 1281)
- Peter of Courtenay, French nobleman (d. 1249)
- Thomas de Cantilupe, English bishop (d. 1282)
- Yolande of Brittany, French noblewoman (d. 1272)

== Deaths ==
- January 10 – Hugh I (or Hugo), king of Cyprus (b. 1195)
- January 23 – Wolfger von Erla, German bishop (b. 1140)
- February 2 – Konstantin of Rostov, Kievan Grand Prince
- February 12 – Alice of Courtenay, French noblewoman
- February 18 – Berthold V, German nobleman (b. 1160)
- May 6 – Theresa of Portugal, countess of Flanders
- May 19 – Otto IV, Holy Roman Emperor (b. 1175)
- June 25 – Simon de Montfort, French nobleman
- July 6 – Odo III (or Eudes), duke of Burgundy (b. 1166)
- August 7 – Adolf VI (or III), German nobleman (b. 1175)
- August 26 – William of Chartres (Templar), French Grand Master
- August 31 – Al-Adil I, Ayyubid general and sultan (b. 1145)
- September 24 – Robert of Knaresborough, English hermit
- November 12 – Henry de Abergavenny, English bishop
- December 28 – Robert II, French nobleman (b. 1154)
- Adelaide of Guelders, countess of Holland (b. 1182)
- Álvara Núñez de Lara, Castilian nobleman (b. 1170)
- Comita III of Torres, Sardinian ruler (judge) (b. 1160)
- Federico Wanga (or Vanga), prince-bishop of Trent
- Franca Piacenza, Italian nun and abbess (b. 1170)
- Geoffrey de Luterel, English landowner and knight
- Giolla Ernain Ó Martain, Irish poet and Chief Ollam
- Henry de Abergavenny, English abbot and bishop
- Jayavarman VII, ruler of the Khmer Empire (b. 1122)
- Peter II, Hungarian prelate, chancellor and bishop
- Theobald VI of Blois, French nobleman and knight
- Umadevi, Indian queen and general (b. 1150)
- William I of Baux, French nobleman (b. 1155)
