= 1215 =

1215 in various calendars
- Gregorian calendar: 1215; MCCXV
- Ab urbe condita: 1968
- Armenian calendar: 664; ԹՎ ՈԿԴ
- Assyrian calendar: 5965
- Balinese saka calendar: 1136–1137
- Bengali calendar: 621–622
- Berber calendar: 2165
- English Regnal year: 16 Joh. 1 – 17 Joh. 1
- Buddhist calendar: 1759
- Burmese calendar: 577
- Byzantine calendar: 6723–6724
- Chinese calendar: 甲戌年 (Wood Dog); 3912 or 3705 — to — 乙亥年 (Wood Pig); 3913 or 3706
- Coptic calendar: 931–932
- Discordian calendar: 2381
- Ethiopian calendar: 1207–1208
- Hebrew calendar: 4975–4976
- Hindu calendars
- Vikram Samvat: 1271–1272
- Shaka Samvat: 1136–1137
- Kali Yuga: 4315–4316
- Holocene calendar: 11215
- Igbo calendar: 215–216
- Iranian calendar: 593–594
- Islamic calendar: 611–612
- Japanese calendar: Kenpō 3 (建保３年)
- Javanese calendar: 1123–1124
- Julian calendar: 1215; MCCXV
- Korean calendar: 3548
- Minguo calendar: 697 before ROC 民前697年
- Nanakshahi calendar: −253
- Thai solar calendar: 1757–1758
- Tibetan calendar: ཤིང་ཕོ་ཁྱི་ལོ་ (male Wood-Dog); 1341 or 960 or 188 — to — ཤིང་མོ་ཕག་ལོ་ (female Wood-Boar); 1342 or 961 or 189

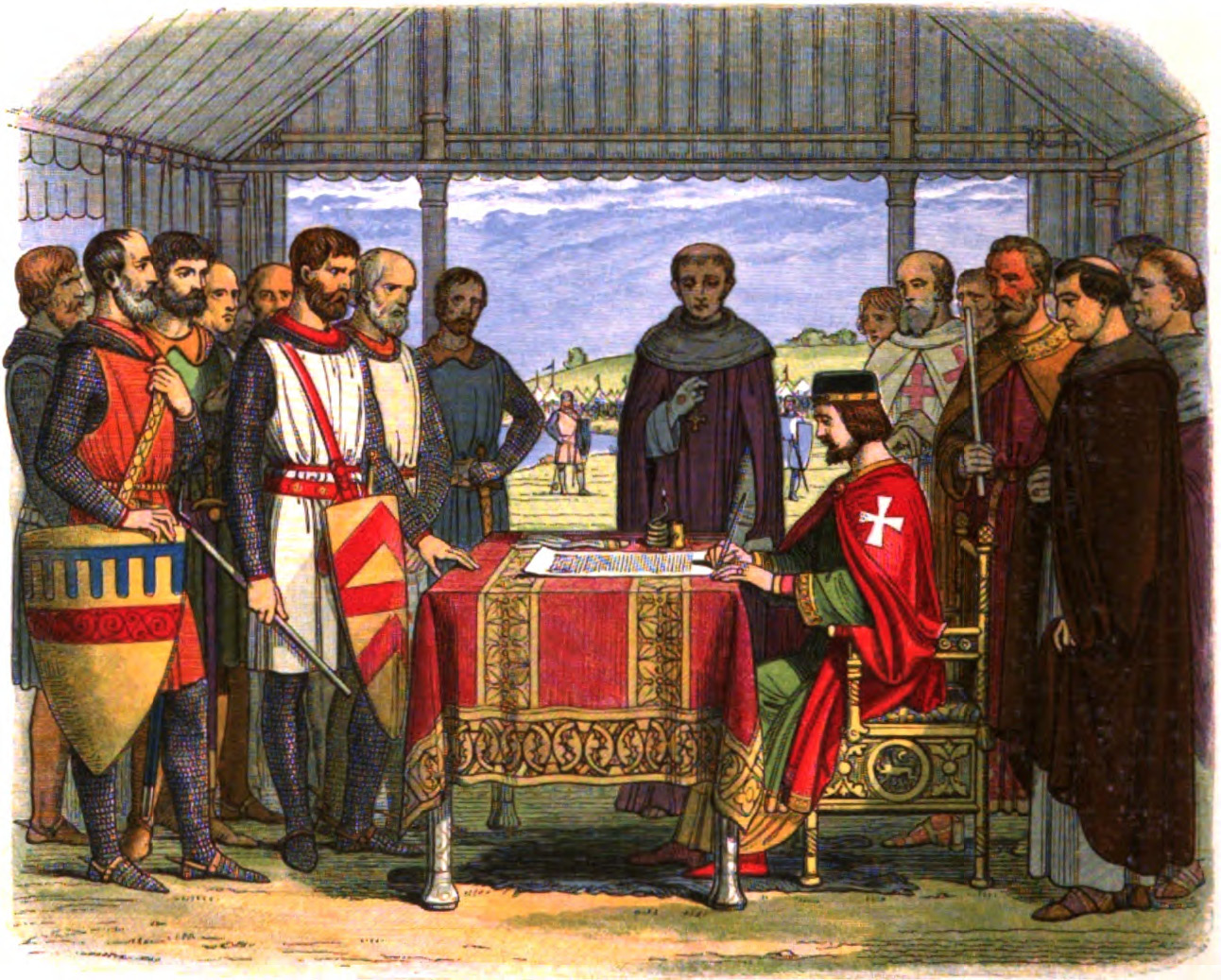
John, King of England signs Magna Carta at Runnymede (near Windsor) (1864)

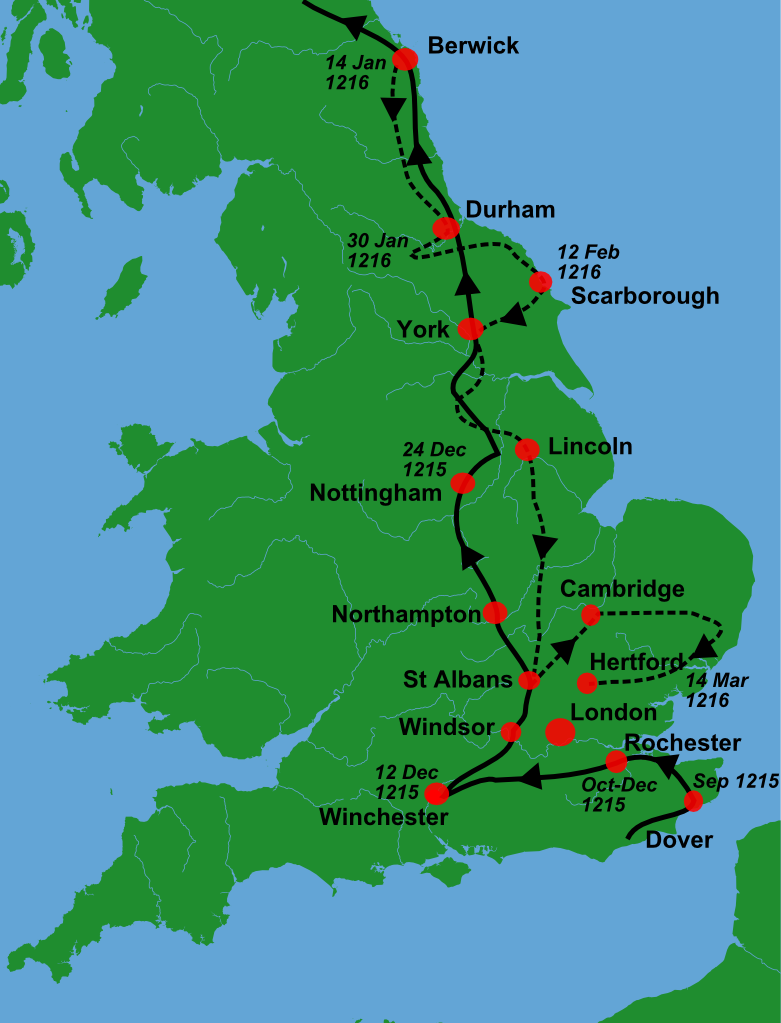
John I's campaign against the Barons from September 1215 to March 1216 in England

Year 1215 (MCCXV) was a common year starting on Thursday of the Julian calendar.

== Events ==
=== By continent ===
==== Europe ====
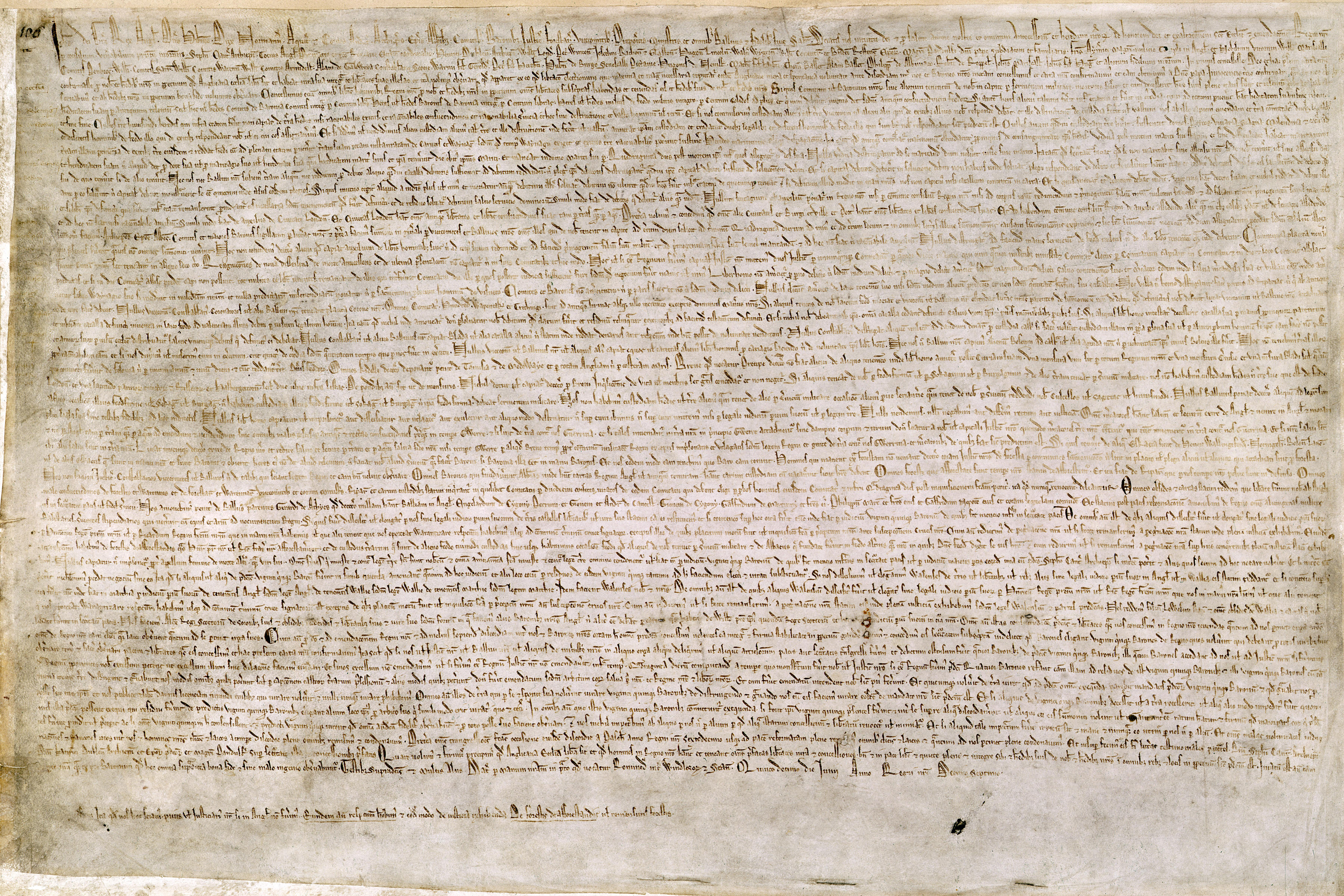
Magna Carta

- January 8 – Simon de Montfort, 5th Earl of Leicester, is elected lord of Languedoc in a council at Montpellier (Southern France), after his campaign against the Cathar heretics during the Albigensian Crusade. The Crusaders capture Château de Castelnaud-la-Chapelle and enter Toulouse; the town pays an indemnity of 30,000 marks and is gifted to Montfort.
- March 4 – John, King of England ("Lackland"), hoping to gain the support of Pope Innocent III against the Barons, takes the oath to go on Crusade. By doing so, Innocent declares John to be his vassal and claims ownership of the whole kingdom (with political protection under church law). On April 1, Innocent sends a letter to the Barons, asking them to halt their actions against John.
- May 5 – Robert Fitzwalter is elected by the Barons as their general, with the title of "Marshal of the Army of God and Holy Church". He solemnly renounces his homage to John of England and begins to siege Northampton Castle. While this fails, Robert consolidates his forces. He turns to Prince Louis of France, son and heir apparent of King Philip II for support.
- May 17 – The gates to London are opened by supporters of the rebellious Barons. The houses of Jews are targeted for ransacking and burning. The rebels, under Robert Fitzwalter, call for the English nobles still on the side of King John to join them, and repair the walls. The Tower of London, held by John's supporters, is too well defended to fall into the hands of the rebels.
- June 15 – A large number of barons, led by Stephen Langton, archbishop of Canterbury, meet King John of England on an island in the Thames at Runnymede. They force John to sign Magna Carta, a document that grants liberties to the "free men" – the Barons, the church and the towns. He is subjected to the rule of law, by confirming the status of trial by jury, on June 19.
- Summer – Emperor Otto IV is excommunicated and forced to abdicate as ruler of the Holy Roman Empire. The German nobles, supported by Innocent III, again elect the 20-year-old Frederick II as King of the Romans who is crowned in Aachen, on July 25. The same day, Frederick takes the Cross and promises to go on Crusade.
- August – King John of England rejects Magna Carta and writes to Innocent III – asking him to cancel the charter on grounds that he signed it against his will. At the same time, John continues to build up his mercenary army.
- August 24 – Pope Innocent III annuls Magna Carta, freeing King John from its limitations. He annuls the charter on the grounds that John signed it because he is forced and that the document is illegal.
- November 11–30 – The Fourth Council of the Lateran (or "Great Council") convened by Innocent III ends at Rome and approves the papal proposal for a Fifth Crusade in Palestine. The Pope promulgates a canon against clerical participation in trial by ordeal, replacing it by compurgation.
- September 13 – King John of England seeks help from Innocent III in his fight against the Barons. In a letter, written while staying at Dover Castle, he states that the defense of England is the responsibility of God and the Pope.
- October – The Barons offer the English crown to Louis of France and invite him to England. King John England confiscates the Barons' land and besieges Rochester Castle; the garrison is starved out and surrenders to him.
- December – First Barons' War: King John of England campaigns successfully in the Midlands and captures Nottingham Castle, on December 24. King Alexander II of Scotland joins the Barons and invades Northern England.

==== Asia ====
- June 1 – Mongol conquest of Jin China: After the long Battle of Zhongdu, the Mongol forces capture Zhongdu (modern-day Beijing). Meanwhile, Genghis Khan has decamped to the edge of the grasslands and is on his way back to the Kherlen River. Without his restraining influence, the Mongols run wild. They devastate and ransack the city, killing thousands. The royal palace goes up in flames, and a part of the capital burns for a month.
- King Kalinga Magha, from Kalinga Province in India, lands in Sri Lanka with a force of 24,000 men, to capture the city of Polonnaruwa and depose its king, Parakrama Pandya.

=== By topic ===
==== Art and Science ====
- 1215–1216 – The Macy Jug, from Iran, is made. It is now kept at the Metropolitan Museum of Art, New York.

== Births ==
- September 23 – Kublai Khan, Mongol emperor (d. 1294)
- Agnes of Merania, German noblewoman (d. 1263)
- Beatrice d'Este, queen consort of Hungary (d. 1245)
- Catherine Sunesdotter, queen of Sweden (d. 1252)
- Celestine V, pope of the Catholic Church (d. 1296)
- David VII (or David Ulugh), king of Georgia (d. 1270)
- Eleanor of England, countess of Leicester (d. 1275)
- Henry II, prince of Anhalt-Aschersleben (d. 1266)
- Henry III, Margrave of Meissen ("the Illustrious"), German nobleman (d. 1288)
- Ibn Kammuna, Arab Jewish philosopher (d. 1284)
- John I, French nobleman and knight (d. 1249)
- John XXI, pope of the Catholic Church (d. 1277)
- John of Ibelin, count of Jaffa and Ascalon (d. 1266)
- Maria of Antioch-Armenia, lady of Toron (d. 1257)
- Mécia Lopes de Haro, queen of Portugal (d. 1270)
- Otto III, Margrave of Brandenburg ("the Pious"), German nobleman (d. 1267)
- Robert Kilwardby, archbishop of Canterbury (d. 1279)
- Roger de Leybourne, English landowner (d. 1271)

== Deaths ==
- February 3 (or February 4) – Eustace, bishop of Ely
- February 6 – Hōjō Tokimasa, Japanese nobleman (b. 1138)
- June 9 – Manegold of Berg, German abbot and bishop
- August 1 – Eisai, Japanese Buddhist priest (b. 1141)
- September 1 – Otto I, bishop of Utrecht (b. 1194)
- November 5 – Philip de Valognes, Norman nobleman
- November 17 – Giles de Braose, bishop of Hereford
- December 21 – Ali ibn Muhammad ibn al-Walid, Arab theologian
- Ali ibn Abi Bakr al-Harawi, Persian traveller and explorer
- Bertran de Born, French nobleman, poet and troubadour
- Esclarmonde of Foix, French noblewoman and Cathar
- Giraut de Bornelh (or de Borneil), French troubadour
- Jacopino della Scala, Italian merchant and politician
- Manfred II (del Vasto), marquis of Saluzzo (b. 1140)
- Sicard of Cremona, Italian bishop and writer (b. 1155)
- Theodore Apsevdis, Byzantine painter (b. 1150)
