= 1217 =

1217 in various calendars
- Gregorian calendar: 1217; MCCXVII
- Ab urbe condita: 1970
- Armenian calendar: 666; ԹՎ ՈԿԶ
- Assyrian calendar: 5967
- Balinese saka calendar: 1138–1139
- Bengali calendar: 623–624
- Berber calendar: 2167
- English Regnal year: 1 Hen. 3 – 2 Hen. 3
- Buddhist calendar: 1761
- Burmese calendar: 579
- Byzantine calendar: 6725–6726
- Chinese calendar: 丙子年 (Fire Rat); 3914 or 3707 — to — 丁丑年 (Fire Ox); 3915 or 3708
- Coptic calendar: 933–934
- Discordian calendar: 2383
- Ethiopian calendar: 1209–1210
- Hebrew calendar: 4977–4978
- Hindu calendars
- Vikram Samvat: 1273–1274
- Shaka Samvat: 1138–1139
- Kali Yuga: 4317–4318
- Holocene calendar: 11217
- Igbo calendar: 217–218
- Iranian calendar: 595–596
- Islamic calendar: 613–614
- Japanese calendar: Kenpō 5 (建保５年)
- Javanese calendar: 1125–1126
- Julian calendar: 1217; MCCXVII
- Korean calendar: 3550
- Minguo calendar: 695 before ROC 民前695年
- Nanakshahi calendar: −251
- Thai solar calendar: 1759–1760
- Tibetan calendar: མེ་ཕོ་བྱི་བ་ལོ་ (male Fire-Rat); 1343 or 962 or 190 — to — མེ་མོ་གླང་ལོ་ (female Fire-Ox); 1344 or 963 or 191

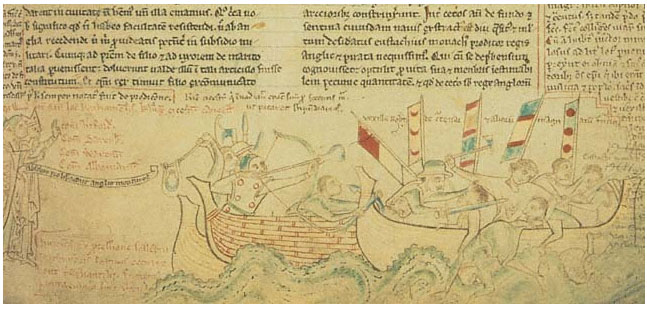
The Battle of Sandwich (13th century)

Year 1217 (MCCXVII) was a common year starting on Sunday of the Julian calendar.

== Events ==
=== Fifth Crusade ===
- Summer – Various groups of French knights reach the Italian ports. King Andrew II of Hungary arrives with his army in Split, in Dalmatia. He is joined by German forces, led by Duke Leopold VI (the Glorious). At the end of July, Pope Honorius III orders the crusaders assembled in Italy and Sicily to proceed to Cyprus, but there is no transport provided by the Italian city-states, Venice, Genoa and Pisa.
- September: Leopold VI finds some ships in Split, that bring him and a small force to Acre. Andrew follows him about a fortnight later; in Split, he receives only two ships. The rest of Andrew's army is left behind. Meanwhile, King Hugh I of Cyprus lands at Acre, with troops to support the Crusade.
- November – The Crusader army (some 15,000 men) under Andrew II sets out from Acre, and marches up the Plain of Esdraelon. Sultan Al-Adil I, on hearing that the crusaders are assembling, sends some Muslim troops to Palestine, to halt their advance. The crusaders move towards Beisan, while Al-Adil waits at Ajloun Castle, ready to intercept any attack on Damascus. He sends his son, Al-Mu'azzam, to cover Jerusalem. On November 10, Andrew's well-mounted army defeats Al-Adil at Bethsaida, on the Jordan River. Beisan is occupied and sacked; the Muslims retreat to their fortresses and towns.
- December – King John I of Jerusalem leads an expedition into Lebanon. On December 3, he undertakes fruitless assaults on Muslim fortresses and on Mount Tabor. Meanwhile, the Crusader army under Andrew II wanders across the Jordan Valley and up the eastern shore of the Sea of Galilee. During the occupation, Andrew spends his time collecting alleged relics. By the end of December, supplies run out, and the crusaders retreat to Acre.

=== Other events by place ===
==== Europe ====
- Spring – First Barons' War: English forces of King Henry III besiege the French-controlled Mountsorrel Castle in Leicestershire. Prince Louis sends reinforcements (some 20,000 men) to assist the Barons in the castle. The English army lifts the siege and withdraws to Nottingham. Louis makes the mistake of moving the French forces to Lincoln Castle – where the English garrison holds out against previous attacks. Meanwhile, Henry's forces return to Mountsorrel Castle. This time Louis fails to arrive in time to prevent the razing to the ground of the castle.
- April 9 – Peter II of Courtenay is crowned emperor of the Latin Empire of Constantinople at Rome, by Pope Honorius III. Shortly after his coronation, Peter borrows some ships from the Venetians, promising in return to conquer Durazzo for them. He fails in this enterprise and seeks to make his way to Constantinople by land. On the journey, he is seized by troops of Theodore Komnenos Doukas, despot of Epirus, and is put in prison.
- May 20 – Battle of Lincoln: Henry III's forces led by William Marshal, 1st Earl of Pembroke defeat the French army of Prince Louis and the rebel barons who are besieging Lincoln Castle. During the battle, Thomas, Comte du Perche is killed and Louis is expelled from his base in the southeast of England. The looting that takes place afterward is known as the "Lincoln Fair". The citizens of Lincoln are loyal to Louis so Henry's forces sack the city. To the south, inhabitants of towns between Lincoln and London ambush and kill many of the French soldiers.
- June 6 – The 13-year-old King Henry I of Castile dies from the fall of a roof tile in Palencia, an event which his regent, Álvaro Núñez de Lara, attempts to conceal. He is succeeded by his sister Berengaria, who renounces the throne in favour of her son Ferdinand III, on August 31. The young king begins his reign (supported by his mother as adviser and regent) by a war against his father, King Alfonso IX of León, and the Castilian nobles.
- June – The 13-year-old Haakon IV becomes king of Norway, following the death of Inge II (Bårdsson) – this largely ends the civil war era in Norway. During his minority, Earl Skule Bårdsson becomes Haakon's regent.
- August 24 – Battle of Sandwich: An English fleet under Hubert de Burgh, Earl of Kent defeats the French armada (10 large ships and 70 supply ships) in the English Channel, near Sandwich. The French fleet is commanded by Eustace the Monk, a mercenary and pirate, who fights for both the French and English when it suits his needs. The French fleet is bringing more men and supplies to assist Prince Louis, in his quest to take the English throne. The English capture Eustace's flagship, and Eustace himself is (while offering 10,000 marks for ransom) beheaded.
- September 12 – Treaty of Kingston: The First Baron's War ends. After the defeat of the French fleet, Prince Louis is without hope of taking the English throne. William Marshal blockades London from the sea and land. At Lambeth Louis accepts peace terms. He waives his claim for the throne and promises to restore Normandy to Henry III but does not. The French and Scots are to leave England, and an amnesty is granted to the rebels.
- September 21 – Livonian Crusade: The Livonian Brothers of the Sword and allied Livs and Letts defeat the Estonian army in the Battle of St. Matthew's Day, and kill their leader Lembitu.
- October 18 – Reconquista: The city of Alcácer do Sal, located along the Sado River, is conquered from the Moors by troops of King Afonso II of Portugal.
- November – In the Kingdom of Castile, former regent and Castilian nobleman, Álvaro Núñez de Lara, is captured and forced to relinquish all his castles.
- unknown date – Stefan Nemanjić is elevated to be the first King of the Serbian lands by Pope Honorius III and crowned by Stefan's brother, Archimandrite Sava, in Žiča.

==== Asia ====
- The Mongol army under Muqali (or Mukhali) attacks Hebei Province, as well as Shandong Province and Shaanxi Province (controlled by the Jin Dynasty). He returns to Genghis Khan's camp in Mongolia, and receives the hereditary of prince with the title "Grand Preceptor of the Empire", a golden seal, and a white standard with nine tails and a black crescent in the middle. He is appointed as commander-in-chief of operations in North China.

== Births ==
- May 3 – Henry I (the Fat), king of Cyprus (d. 1253)
- August 19 – Ninshō, Japanese priest (d. 1303)
- Baldwin II of Courtenay, Latin emperor (d. 1273)
- Baldwin de Redvers, English nobleman (d. 1245)
- Boniface of Savoy, English archbishop (d. 1270)
- Ferdinand, Portuguese prince (infante) (d. 1246)
- George Akropolites, Byzantine statesman (d. 1282)
- Guillaume III, French nobleman and knight (d. 1288)
- Guo Kan, Chinese general and governor (d. 1277)
- Henry of Antioch, co-ruler of Jerusalem (d. 1276)
- Henry of Ghent, Flemish philosopher (d. 1293)
- Ibn Sab'in, Andalusian Sufi philosopher (d. 1271)
- Izz al-Din ibn Shaddad, Arab historian (d. 1285)
- John I (the Red), English nobleman (d. 1286)
- Kangan Giin, Japanese Zen master (d. 1300)

== Deaths ==
- February 9 – Raynald of Nocera, Italian monk and bishop (b. 1150)
- February 22 – Judah ben Samuel of Regensburg, German Jewish rabbi (b. 1150)
- March 30 – Fujiwara no Kanefusa, Japanese nobleman (b. 1153)
- March 31 – Alexander Neckam, English abbot (b. 1157)
- April 21 – Al-Mansur Abdallah, Yemeni imam (b. 1166)
- April 23 – Inge Bårdsson, king of Norway (b. 1185)
- April 25 – Hermann I, Landgrave of Thuringia (or III), German nobleman (b. 1155)
- May 20 – Thomas, Count of Perche, French nobleman (b. 1195)
- June 6 – Henry I, king of Castile and Toledo (b. 1204)
- July 22 – Hadmar II of Kuenring, German nobleman
- August 24 – Eustace the Monk, French mercenary
- September 8 – Robert I, Count of Alençon, French nobleman and knight
- September 10 – William de Redvers, 5th Earl of Devon, English nobleman
- September 21
  - Caupo of Turaida, king of Livonia
  - Lembitu, Estonian military leader
- September 29 – Jean de Montmirail, French monk (b. 1165)
- October 14 – Isabella, English noblewoman, sometime queen consort of England (b. c. 1163)
- November 4 – Philip of Dreux, French bishop (b. 1158)
- November 29 – Ibn Jubayr, Andalusian traveller (b. 1145)
- December 29 – Gyōi, Japanese monk and poet (b. 1177)
- Abd al-Haqq I, ruler of the Marinid Sultanate (b. 1147)
- Jigten Sumgön, founder of the Drikung Kagyu (b. 1143)
- John of Ferentino, Italian notary and cardinal (b. 1150)
- Maria Komnene, queen consort of Jerusalem (b. 1154)
- Nijōin no Sanuki, Japanese noblewoman (b. 1141)
- Niketas Choniates, Byzantine historian (b. 1155)
- Philip Simonsson, Norwegian nobleman (b. 1185)
- Reginald of Bar (or de Mouçon), French bishop
- Richard de Clare, 3rd Earl of Hertford, Anglo-Norman nobleman and knight
- Simon of Pattishall (or Pateshull), English judge
- Torchitorio IV of Cagliari, Sardinian judge (b. 1190)
- Wang Chuyi, Chinese Daoist philosopher (b. 1142)
- William I, Count of Sancerre, French nobleman and knight (b. 1176)
- William de Lanvallei, English landowner and knight
