= 1150 =

1150 in various calendars
- Gregorian calendar: 1150; MCL
- Ab urbe condita: 1903
- Armenian calendar: 599; ԹՎ ՇՂԹ
- Assyrian calendar: 5900
- Balinese saka calendar: 1071–1072
- Bengali calendar: 556–557
- Berber calendar: 2100
- English Regnal year: 15 Ste. 1 – 16 Ste. 1
- Buddhist calendar: 1694
- Burmese calendar: 512
- Byzantine calendar: 6658–6659
- Chinese calendar: 己巳年 (Earth Snake); 3847 or 3640 — to — 庚午年 (Metal Horse); 3848 or 3641
- Coptic calendar: 866–867
- Discordian calendar: 2316
- Ethiopian calendar: 1142–1143
- Hebrew calendar: 4910–4911
- Hindu calendars
- Vikram Samvat: 1206–1207
- Shaka Samvat: 1071–1072
- Kali Yuga: 4250–4251
- Holocene calendar: 11150
- Igbo calendar: 150–151
- Iranian calendar: 528–529
- Islamic calendar: 544–545
- Japanese calendar: Kyūan 6 (久安６年)
- Javanese calendar: 1056–1057
- Julian calendar: 1150; MCL
- Korean calendar: 3483
- Minguo calendar: 762 before ROC 民前762年
- Nanakshahi calendar: −318
- Seleucid era: 1461/1462 AG
- Thai solar calendar: 1692–1693
- Tibetan calendar: ས་མོ་སྦྲུལ་ལོ་ (female Earth-Snake); 1276 or 895 or 123 — to — ལྕགས་ཕོ་རྟ་ལོ་ (male Iron-Horse); 1277 or 896 or 124

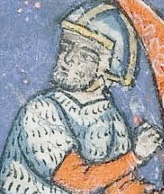
Nur al-Din, ruler of Aleppo (1118–1174)

Year 1150 (MCL) was a common year starting on Sunday of the Julian calendar.

== Events ==
=== By place ===
==== Byzantine Empire ====
- Battle of Tara: The Byzantines defeat the Serbian-Hungarian army under Grdeša, count (župan) of Travunija, near the snow-covered Tara River. The Serbs are overpowered, and Grand Prince Uroš II is forced to accept the peace agreement made by Emperor Manuel I Komnenos. Uroš is succeeded by his brother Desa, who becomes co-ruler of the Principality of Serbia (until 1153).

==== Levant ====
- Spring – Joscelin II, count of Edessa, on his way to Antioch is separated from his escort and falls into the hands of some Turcoman free-booters. Nur al-Din, ruler (atabeg) of Aleppo, heard of Joscelin's capture and sends a squadron of cavalry to take him from his captors. Joscelin is led before a hostile crowd and publicly blinded. Nur al-Din puts him in prison in the Citadel of Aleppo.
- Battle of Aintab: A Crusader army led by King Baldwin III repels the attacks of Nur al-Din near Aintab. Baldwin safely evacuates the Christian residents of the County of Edessa, which is captured by the Zangids.
- The city of Ascalon is fortified with 53 towers by order of the 17-year-old Caliph Al-Zafir, as it is the most strategic frontier fortress of the Fatimid Caliphate.

==== Europe ====
- February 8 – Battle of Flochberg: German forces under Henry VI defeat the army of the House of Welf at Bopfingen. At the same time, King Conrad III besieges Welf forces at Braunschweig in Saxony, but he lifts the siege when confronted by Henry the Lion.
- The University of Paris (known as the Sorbonne) is founded. The first doctorate degree is awarded in Paris.
- The city of Rinteln is founded on the northern bank of the Weser River in Lower Saxony (modern Germany).

==== Britain ====
- November 10 – Dryburgh Abbey located in the Scottish Borders is founded by Lord Hugh de Morville.
- Cubbie Roo's Castle is built on Wyre (Orkney Islands) and is first mentioned in the Orkneyinga saga.
- Christchurch Priory located in Hampshire is founded by Earl Baldwin de Redvers.
- The Irish Chronology (Chronicon Scotorum) is written (approximate date).

=== By topic ===
==== Religion ====
- The 15-year-old King Inge I ("the Hunchback") of Norway calls for a meeting at Bergen of all religious leaders in anticipation that the English cardinal Nicholas Breakspear will find an archbishopric at Trondheim.
- Peter Lombard, a French scholastic theologian, publishes the Four Books of Sentences, which becomes the standard textbook of theology at the medieval universities.
- The temple at Angkor Wat ("Capital of Temples") is completed in the Khmer Empire (modern Cambodia).

== Births ==
- January 26 – Fakhr al-Din al-Razi, Persian polymath (d. 1210)
- October 8 – Narapatisithu, ruler of the Pagan Kingdom (d. 1211)
- Agnes of Loon, German duchess and regent (d. 1191)
- Albert de Rethel, Flemish clergyman and priest (d. 1195)
- Alix of France, French countess and regent (d. 1197)
- André de Chauvigny, French nobleman (d. 1202)
- Azalaïs of Montferrat, Italian noblewoman (d. 1232)
- Baldwin V, count of Hainaut and Flanders (d. 1195)
- Geoffrey of Villehardouin, French knight (d. 1213)
- Gerald FitzMaurice, Norman nobleman (d. 1204)
- Henry de Longchamp, English high sheriff (d. 1212)
- Henryk Kietlicz, archbishop of Gniezno (d. 1219)
- Hermann Joseph, German priest and mystic (d. 1241)
- Honorius III, pope of the Catholic Church (d. 1227)
- Hugh II of Saint Omer, prince of Galilee (d. 1204)
- John Comyn, archbishop of Dublin (approximate date)
- John de Courcy (or Courci), Norman knight (d. 1219)
- Judah ben Samuel, German Jewish rabbi (d. 1217)
- Leo I (or Levon), king of Armenian Cilicia (d. 1219)
- Minamoto no Noriyori, Japanese general (d. 1193)
- Otto I, count of Guelders and Zutphen (d. 1207)
- Qutb al-Din Aibak, ruler of the Delhi Sultanate (d. 1210)
- Ramon I, Catalonian nobleman (approximate date)
- Robert IV, French nobleman and Grand Master (d. 1193)
- Rosamund Clifford, English noblewoman (d. 1176)
- Stephen Langton, English archbishop (d. 1228)
- Theodore Apsevdis, Byzantine painter (d. 1215)
- Umadevi, Indian queen and general (d. 1218)
- William de Braose, English nobleman (d. 1211)
- Wincenty Kadłubek, bishop of Kraków (d. 1223)
- Ye Shi, Chinese scholar and philosopher (d. 1223)

== Deaths ==
- January 9 – Xi Zong, Chinese emperor of the Jin Dynasty (b. 1119)
- March 20 – Simon of Worcester, bishop of Worcester
- April 8 – Gertrude of Babenberg, German duchess (b. 1118)
- August 27 – Guarinus of Sitten, French bishop (b. 1065)
- September 16 – Sibylla of Burgundy, queen of Sicily (b. 1126)
- November 12 – Hartbert van Bierum, bishop of Utrecht
- November 21 – García IV ("the Restorer"), king of Navarre
- December 16 – Raynald of Bar, French abbot
- Barisan of Ibelin ("the Old"), French nobleman
- Henry Berengar, co-ruler of Germany
- Hervé de Bourg-Dieu, French biblical scholar
- Ibn Masal, Fatimid general, official and vizier
- Jabir ibn Aflah, Andalusian astronomer (b. 1100)
- Kjeld (or Ketil), Danish clergyman and saint
- Reinward, bishop of Meissen (approximate date)
- Renier de Huy, Flemish goldsmith and sculptor
- Robert de Sigello, English bishop and chancellor
- Suryavarman II, ruler of the Khmer Empire
- Teobaldo Roggeri, Italian shoemaker (b. 1100)
- William the Simple, French nobleman (b. 1085)
