= 1288 =

1288 in various calendars
- Gregorian calendar: 1288; MCCLXXXVIII
- Ab urbe condita: 2041
- Armenian calendar: 737; ԹՎ ՉԼԷ
- Assyrian calendar: 6038
- Balinese saka calendar: 1209–1210
- Bengali calendar: 694–695
- Berber calendar: 2238
- English Regnal year: 16 Edw. 1 – 17 Edw. 1
- Buddhist calendar: 1832
- Burmese calendar: 650
- Byzantine calendar: 6796–6797
- Chinese calendar: 丁亥年 (Fire Pig); 3985 or 3778 — to — 戊子年 (Earth Rat); 3986 or 3779
- Coptic calendar: 1004–1005
- Discordian calendar: 2454
- Ethiopian calendar: 1280–1281
- Hebrew calendar: 5048–5049
- Hindu calendars
- Vikram Samvat: 1344–1345
- Shaka Samvat: 1209–1210
- Kali Yuga: 4388–4389
- Holocene calendar: 11288
- Igbo calendar: 288–289
- Iranian calendar: 666–667
- Islamic calendar: 686–687
- Japanese calendar: Kōan 11 / Shōō 1 (正応元年)
- Javanese calendar: 1198–1199
- Julian calendar: 1288; MCCLXXXVIII
- Korean calendar: 3621
- Minguo calendar: 624 before ROC 民前624年
- Nanakshahi calendar: −180
- Thai solar calendar: 1830–1831
- Tibetan calendar: མེ་མོ་ཕག་ལོ་ (female Fire-Boar); 1414 or 1033 or 261 — to — ས་ཕོ་བྱི་བ་ལོ་ (male Earth-Rat); 1415 or 1034 or 262

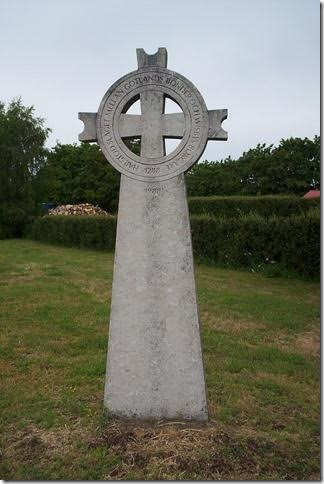
Commemorative stone over the civil war in Gotland 1288.

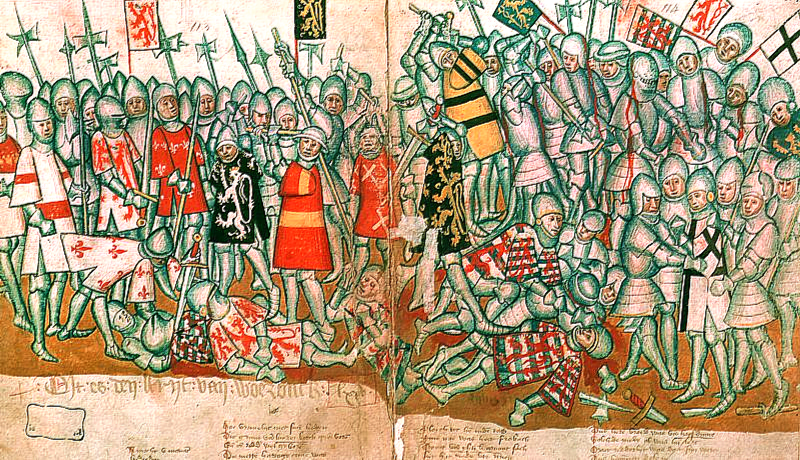
Illustration of the Battle of Worringen

Year 1288 (MCCLXXXVIII) was a leap year starting on Thursday of the Julian calendar.

== Events ==
=== By place ===
==== Europe ====
- A civil war breaks out on Gotland between the burghers of Visby and the rural farmers of Gotland; while the exact reason for this war is unknown, the most likely reason is the construction of a large wall around Visby, and the introduction of a toll, which the farmers were forced to pay.
- June 5 – War of the Limburg Succession – Battle of Worringen: Brabantian forces under Duke John I defeat the coalition army of Cologne, Luxemburg, and Nassau at Worringen (in a struggle to conquer the Duchy of Limburg). John liberates the city of Cologne from rule by the Electorate of Cologne, which has previously been one of the major ecclesiastical principalities of the Holy Roman Empire.
- Summer – Sultan Muhammad II drives the rebellious Banu Ashqilula from one stronghold to the next, where they are finally expelled from Granadan territory in Al-Andalus (modern Spain). Meanwhile, Muhammad manages through diplomatic intrigue, to turn the Castilian aristocracy against King Sancho IV. In response, King Alfonso III proclaims the 18-year-old Alfonso de la Cerda as ruler of Castile and León.
- August 8 – Pope Nicholas IV proclaims a crusade against the 26-year-old King Ladislaus IV, who had lost credibility by favoring his semi-pagan Cuman subjects in Hungary, and in general refusing to conform to the social standards of Western Europe. Meanwhile, the Hungarian government loses more power because the clergy and most of the nobles rule the kingdom independently.
- October 28 – Treaty of Canfranc: King Edward I signs an agreement with Alfonso III at Canfranc, about the release of Charles II, who has been captured by Admiral Roger of Lauria in the Battle of the Gulf of Naples (see 1284).

==== England and Scotland ====
- January 20 – Newcastle Emlyn Castle in West Wales is recaptured by the English forces after a ten-day siege, bringing Rhys ap Maredudd's revolt to an end. Rhys is exiled to Ireland.
- The Parliament of Scotland creates a law allowing women to propose marriage to men during leap years; men who refuse such proposals are required to pay a fine to the spurned bride-to-be.

==== Levant ====
- Spring – Genoa orders Admiral Benedetto Zaccaria to send five galleys to support Genoese suzerainty of Tripoli. Princess Lucia, sister of the late Count Bohemond VII, arrives in Acre, where the Knights Hospitaller escort her to the frontier with Tripoli. The commune refuses to accept her as new ruler and places the city under Genoese protection. After negotiations, Lucia offers to confirm Genoa's existing commercial privileges in Tripoli.

==== Asia ====
- April 9 – Battle of Bạch Đằng: Đại Việt (Vietnamese) general Trần Hưng Đạo sinks the fleet of an invading Mongol-led Yuan expeditionary army (some 94,000 men). He orders the placing of steel-tipped bamboo stakes (to create an ambush) in the Bach Dang River near Ha Long Bay. This ends the intentions of Kublai Khan to conquer Vietnam and Champa.
- April – The Japanese era Kōan ends and the Shōō era begins during the reign of the 22-year-old Emperor Fushimi (until 1293).

=== By topic ===
==== Art and culture ====
- The oldest surviving bell, in the clocks atop the dome of St. Peter's Basilica in Rome, is built.
- Work is begun on the construction of Mob Quad in Merton College, Oxford.

==== Markets ====
- June 16 – Petrus, bishop of Västerås, buys 1/8 of the Stora Kopparberg copper mine in Falun, Sweden. During the reign of King Magnus Ladulås, nobles and foreign merchants from Lübeck take interests in the mining area.
- The Flemish city of Ghent seeks rights to start redeeming its already issued annuities. It is a clear indication of financial difficulty, and maybe an early sign of the crisis of the 13th Century.

==== Religion ====
- February 22 – Nicholas IV is elected as the successor of the late Honorius IV (see 1287) during a conclave in Rome and becomes the 191st pope of the Catholic Church.
- March–April – Rabban Bar Sauma, Chinese Nestorian monk and diplomat, arrives at Rome and is received by Nicholas IV, who gives him communion on Palm Sunday.

==== Technology ====
- The oldest-known bronze handgun in the world is dated to this year, a Chinese gun found in Acheng District, that was once used to suppress the rebellion of the Mongol prince Nayan.

== Births ==
- January 20 – Robert Lisle, English nobleman (d. 1344)
- April 5 – Go-Fushimi, emperor (tenno) of Japan (d. 1336)
- November 1 – Ivan I, Grand Duke of Moscow (d. 1341)
- November 26 – Go-Daigo, emperor of Japan (d. 1339)
- Adolph II de la Marck, French prince-bishop (d. 1344)
- Blanche of Burgundy, French noblewoman (d. 1348)
- Charles I, king of Hungary (House of Anjou) (d. 1342)
- Gersonides, French Jewish mathematician (d. 1344)
- Guillaume I, French nobleman and knight (d. 1335)
- John of Beaumont, Dutch nobleman and knight (d. 1356)
- Mahmoud Shabestari, Persian poet and writer (d. 1340)
- Nicholas II, German nobleman and chamberlain (d. 1365)
- Nicolas Béhuchet, French nobleman and admiral (d. 1340)
- Nijō Michihira, Japanese nobleman and advisor (d. 1335)
- Pedro Afonso, Portuguese nobleman and knight (d. 1350)
- Philip of Majorca, Aragonese prince and regent (d. 1343)
- Pierre Desprès, French cardinal and diplomat (d. 1361)

== Deaths ==
- February 15 – Henry III (the Illustrious), German nobleman
- April 24 – Gertrude of Austria, Austrian noblewoman (b. 1226)
- June 5
  - Henry VI, count of Luxembourg (the Condemned)
  - Waleran I, French nobleman (House of Luxembourg)
- June 8 – Lope Díaz III, Spanish nobleman and knight (b. 1245)
- June 26 – Siegfried IV, German nobleman and prince-bishop
- July 3 – Stephen de Fulbourn, English archbishop and politician
- August 2 – Alix of Brittany (or Blois), Breton noblewoman (b. 1243)
- September 7 – Agnes of Dampierre, French noblewoman (b. 1237)
- September 29 – Matilda of Brabant, French noblewoman (b. 1224)
- September 30 – Leszek II (the Black), Polish nobleman (b. 1241)
- November 11 – Beatrice of Brabant, countess of Flanders (b. 1225)
- November 19 – Rudolf I, German nobleman and regent (b. 1230)
- December 17 – Ibn al-Nafis, Syrian scholar and polymath (b. 1213)
- Guillaume III, French nobleman, chamberlain and knight (b. 1217)
- Matilda of Holstein (or Mechthild), queen consort of Denmark
- Shang Ting, Chinese calligrapher, poet and writer (b. 1209)
- Tikkana Somayaji, Indian Prime-Minister and poet (b. 1205)
- Wang Qinghui, Chinese concubine, poet and writer (b. 1264)
