= Francesco Lippi =

Italian hermit and Carmelite friar declared Blessed by the Catholic Church

Blessed Franco Lippi, O.Carm.
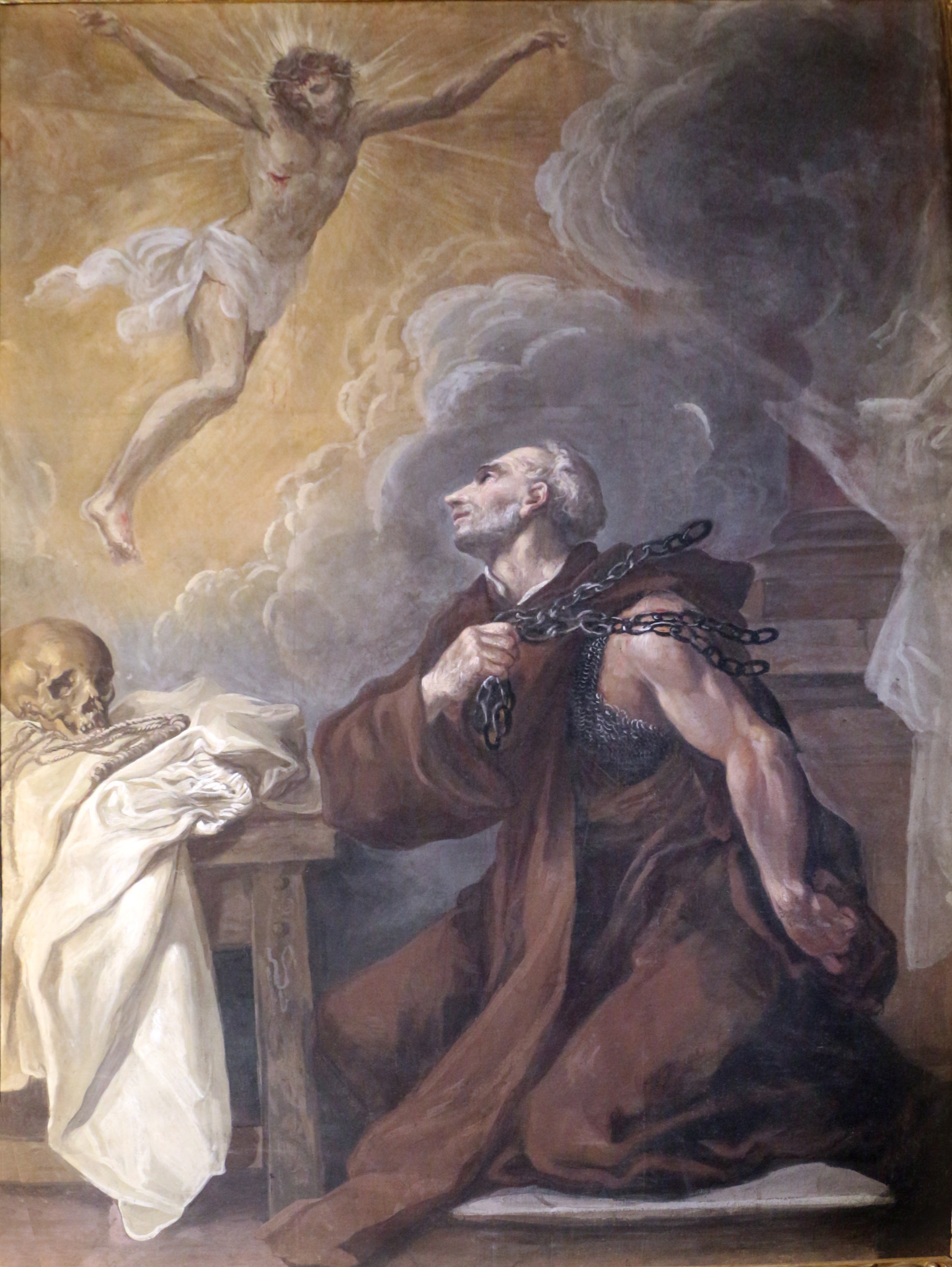
- Painting in the Church of San Martino in Bologna of Franco practicing penance

Hermit and Religious
- Born: 3 December 1211; Siena, Republic of Siena
- Died: 11 December 1291 (aged 80); Siena, Republic of Siena
- Resting place: Carmelite Monastery, Cremona, Italy
- Venerated in: Roman Catholic Church (Carmelite Order)
- Beatified: 1670 (equivalent beatification) by Pope Clement X
- Feast: 11 December
- Attributes: Carmelite habit; Rosary; Ball; Chain

Franco Lippi, O.Carm., or Francesco, also known as Franco of Siena, (3 December 1211 – 11 December 1291) was an Italian hermit and Carmelite friar. He lived his life as a soldier before suffering the loss of his sight, the miraculous healing of which led him down the path of repentance and into the Carmelite Order.

Lippi was considered beatified in 1670, when Pope Clement X approved Lippi's longstanding local cultus (or popular devotion).

== Life ==
Lippi was born on 3 December 1211 in Siena to the nobles Matteo Lippi and Dorotea.

He spent a dissolute youth as a soldier who indulged in vices and his outfit captured Sarteano from the Orvientani. But in that conflict he was blinded in 1261. He offered to change his life if he was healed which, according to tradition, occurred after requesting the intercession of St. James. He then travelled on a pilgrimage to the famed shrine of St. James at Santiago de Campostela in Spain. and to the Basilica di San Nicola in Bari to visit the tomb of St. Nicholas. He also travelled to the Basilica of the Holy House in Loreto, as well as to Rome. Lippi listened to the preaching of the famed Dominican friar Ambrose Sansedoni in Siena and was resolved to live the remainder of his life as a hermit and to do penance for his earlier life; he then shut himself in a small cell and remained there from 1261 to 1266.

Lippi was admitted to the Carmelites and continued to live as a hermit. He experienced visions of Jesus Christ and the Madonna as well as seeing angels and experiencing the temptations of demons. He also possessed prophetic gifts.

He died on 11 December 1291. Part of his relics were relocated to a Carmelite monastery in Cremona in 1341.

== Beatification ==
The confirmation of the late Lippi's 'cultus' (or popular devotion) allowed for Pope Clement X to approve his beatification in 1670. His iconographical depiction includes a chain and a ball in his mouth which he used to practice silence.
