= Richalmus =

Richalmus (Richalm von Schöntal or Schönthal) (died 1219) was a German Cistercian abbot, known for his work of monastic life, notorious for its demonology, the Liber Revelationum, printed much later in the sixteenth century.

Richalmus claimed it to be untrue that every person is haunted by one demon only. On the contrary, demons will crowd like a thick wall around any human, and when Richalmus closed his eyes, he would often see tiny demons flying around both himself and others, "thick as dust in a ray of sun".
