= Hervé de Bourg-Dieu =

French biblical scholar (c.1080–1150)

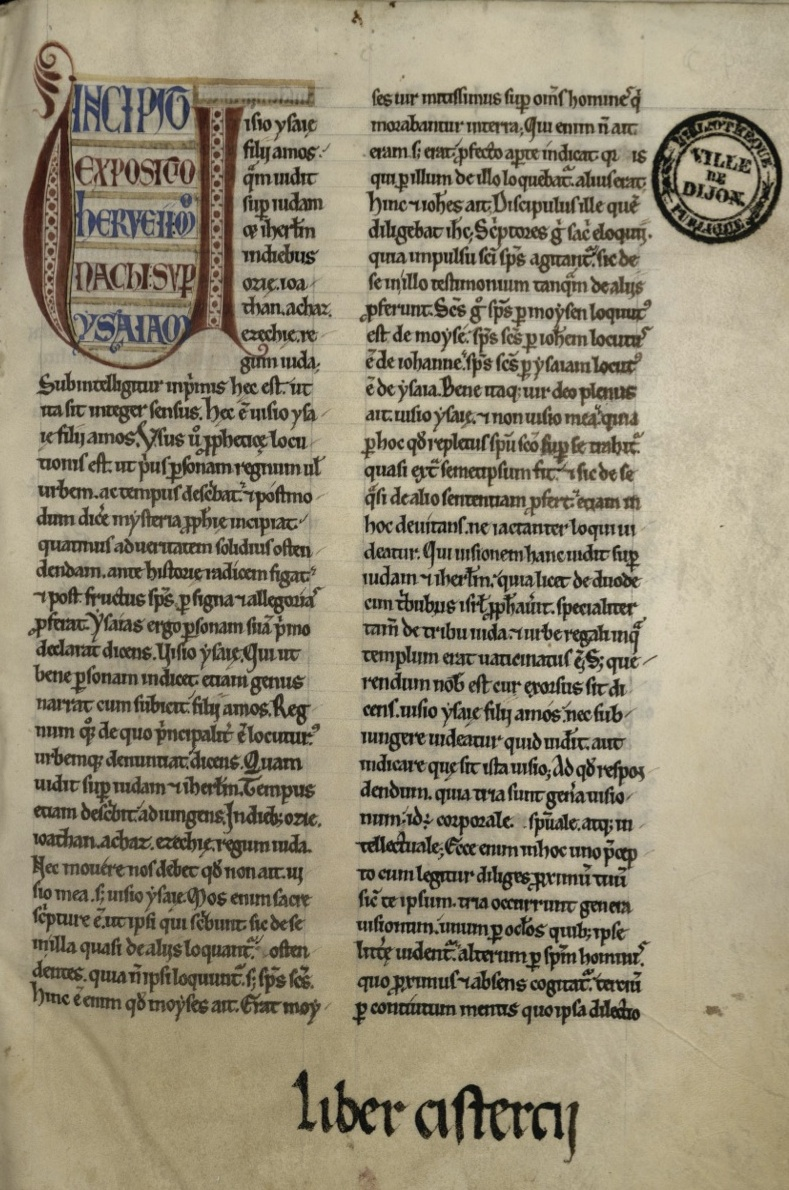
The first page of the manuscript Commentarii in Isaiam prophetam by Hervé de Déols (Bibliothèque municipale de Dijon)

Hervé de Bourg-Dieu (c. 1080 in Le Mans – 1150 in Déols; French pronunciation: [d'buʁ]) was a French Benedictine exegete. He is known particularly for his Commentarii in Isaiam prophetam, on the Book of Isaiah.
