= William de Lanvallei =

Anglo-Norman nobleman

William de Lanvallei III (died 1217) was an English landowner, governor of Colchester Castle. He was lord of Walkern, Hertfordshire.

== Relationship with King John ==
William III accompanied King John of England on his expedition to Poitou in 1214 and was present at the truce. William III was an enforcer of Magna Carta and was related to several of the Magna Carta barons (see "family" section below).

== Family ==
William was the grandson of the founder of the family fortune, William de Lanvallai I, a Breton. William I (1125-1180), was an administrator for Henry II of England after his takeover of the duchy of Brittany in 1166. William served in the office for five years, crossing to England in 1171 or 1172. to become the king's castellan of Winchester. William I married Gunnora, the daughter of Hubert de Saint Clair (1120-1155).

William II (c.1161-1204), son of William I, married Hawise, great-granddaughter of Hugh de Bocland (Buckland, Oxfordshire).

William III, son of William II, married Maud, daughter of Gilbert (Hamon) Peche. Maud was niece of Robert Fitzwalter, a leader of the Magna Carta barons.

Hawise, daughter of William III, was placed as ward with Hubert de Burgh. Hubert married Hawise to his son, John.

== Coat of arms and heraldic misattribution ==
The coat of arms historically and properly attributed to William de Lanvallei III is blazoned as: Gules, a lion passant or (a gold lion walking across a red shield).

A significant error has proliferated where a different coat of arms—Ermine, two bars vert (an ermine field with two green horizontal bars)—is wrongly assigned to William de Lanvallei under the fictitious title "Lord of Standway Castle" (a likely misspelling of Stanway in Essex).

The arms Ermine, two bars vert belong exclusively to the Delaval family of Northumberland. The misattribution likely occurred due to the phonetic similarity between the names De Lanvallei and Delaval.
