= Grasslands of China =

Natural biome

Grassland accounts for China’s largest land resource, covering nearly 41 percent of the national land area. Grassland in the Chinese context comprises widely varying eco-types ranging from the meadows and forest steppes of former Manchuria in the Northeast; and the high, alpine pastures of the Qinghai-Tibetan plateau; to the (semi)arid steppes and deserts in China’s Great West. Due to this geographical and ecological variety, the utilization of grassland is not limited to grazing and forage production, but extends to the exploitation of grassland and forest by-products, as well as the exploitation of mineral resources. Of the total of around 393 million hectares of grassland in China, 84 percent or 331 million hectares is deemed usable for grazing.

== Degradation ==
In the arid and semi-arid regions, large tracts of grassland consist of steppe, semi-desert or desert, with low or very low forage production. It is believed that a major proportion of China’s grasslands have been degraded or desertified to varying degrees. A variety of causes for grassland degradation has been identified, which include overgrazing, overpopulation, mining, agricultural reclamation, pests and rodents, geophysical change, climate change and variability. It needs to be noted that there is contention about the extent to which degradation has taken or is taking place. Some have also posited that Chinese statistics over grassland degradation are politicized and need reinterpretation in the light of larger ethnic, geo-political and strategic interests. In this regard, non-equilibrium range ecology posits that under conditions of high precipitation variability, the human factor becomes secondary to abiotic factors in influencing desertification and grassland degradation.

== Legal status ==
Grasslands were legally made public property during the Land Reform in the 1950s, albeit without an existing definition of what constitutes public ownership, and only well after the turmoil of the Cultural Revolution were grasslands redefined as state-owned in the 1982 constitution. Further grassland reform came as part of the 1980s market reform, which started in the rural agricultural areas, but also included rangelands through a controversial path of privatizing grazing animals and the use rights of state-owned pastures. Although currently the Chinese state nationalized grasslands, their ownership is still claimed by the collectives, while the mining of the grasslands’ subsoil resources has remained a Daedalean collusion of state, collective and private interests.

== Grassland policies ==
=== Pasture Household Contract Responsibility System ===
The 1985 Rangeland Law defined the Pasture Household Contract Responsibility System (short: the Pasture Contract System) under which individuals and collectives could contract collective or state rangeland. The Ministry of Agriculture envisioned four different stages in putting the pasture contract system into effect:

1. The distribution of animals that were formerly owned by the collective to individual households.

2. The assessment, or in some cases re-assessment, of range boundaries between collectives and the consequent allocation of rangeland user rights to collectives and households.

3. The appraisal of the pastures in terms of carrying capacities or stocking rates.

4. The implementation of a legal system of incentives and penalties to ensure that producers abide by the carrying capacities of the plots of land assigned to them, and the establishment of a supervisory institutional structure to enforce the legal rules and regulations.

While these guidelines exist on paper, scholars have questioned the actual practice of the Pasture Contract System. Longworth and Williamson for instance noted that the policy does not exist at the village and household level. It is also found that as long as state and collective ownership of rangeland, and the level of collective ownership are not clarified, the consistency of the pasture contract system is jeopardized. In response to the implementation difficulties of the pasture contract system, scholars and officials within the Chinese Ministry of Agriculture have suggested that the responsibility of management and control for rangelands should be vested in the collective, be it the administrative or natural village, or smaller traditional social groups.

=== Resettlement of Nomads ===
The management of grassland frequently reaches into the socioeconomic sphere, in China and elsewhere, touching on matters of regional planning and the sedentarization of nomadic people and pastoralists. The sedentarization of nomadic herders (dingju youmumin) should not be confused with the term 'ecological resettlement' (shengtai yimin), that has often been used interchangeably. In a policy document of the National Development and Reform Commission (NDCR), it was stated that: "By settling nomads one can improve their production and living standards, and promote economic growth and social development of the ethnic regions, in order to […] expel social unrest, and maintain ethnic unity and stability of the border areas". This example shows that aside from nature conservation and environmental protection, grassland policies often simultaneously serve wider interests.

=== Grazing Ban ===
According to numerous government reports, China’s grasslands are suffering from serious overgrazing, leading to degradation and desertification. In response to this, the state has issued a strict prohibition on grazing where pastoralism and livestock farmers are prohibited from grazing livestock on grassland in place of stall-feeding. To compensate for the loss of income, herders are entitled to subsidies based on a flat rate of 6 RMB per mu of pasture. The Grazing Ban was adopted as national policy for the first time in 2000 and later encoded in the revised Grassland Law in 2002 (article 35, section 2). In following years, the Grazing Ban was merged with additional programs including the ‘Herds for Grass Program’ (in 2005) and the ‘Payment for Grassland Services’ (2011). Due to the Grazing Ban’s merging with other policies, there is considerable confusion regarding its relation with the Herds for Grass Program (of which it is a part) and the Payment for Grassland Services (to which it is an addition).

The Grazing Ban and its implementation have been received in overly negative terms. With only a few exceptions, the Grazing Ban has been unfavorably evaluated by a variety of studies. Reasons for failure include the ill-adapted nature to ecological realities of the pastoral area and its commandist or top-down manner of implementation. Other problems are found in the administration, standards and payment of subsidies, along with rent-seeking by local cadres and adverse effects on income and livelihood. It is found that the ban has a lack of credibility and has been subject to rural disobedience through clandestine grazing during the night or at remote locations.
