= Henry de Abergavenny =

Bishop of Llandaff, Wales (died 1218)

Henry de Abergavenny (died 1218) was Prior of Abergavenny and Bishop of Llandaff, both in South Wales.

Henry was a Benedictine monk who became Prior of Abergavenny, before succeeding to the diocese of Llandaff which had been vacant for two years. He was consecrated on 12 December 1193. Henry organised the Cathedral chapter at Llandaff, appointing fourteen prebends (eight priests, four deacons and two sub-deacons). He also assisted at the coronation of King John in 1199. Henry died on 12 November 1218 and was succeeded by William de Goldcliff. Henry was buried in the Llandaff Cathedral; his gravestone is said to be on the half-pace before the altar rails.
