= Franca Visalta =

Cistercian abbess, ascetic, and saint

Saint Franca Visalta of Piacenza SOCist
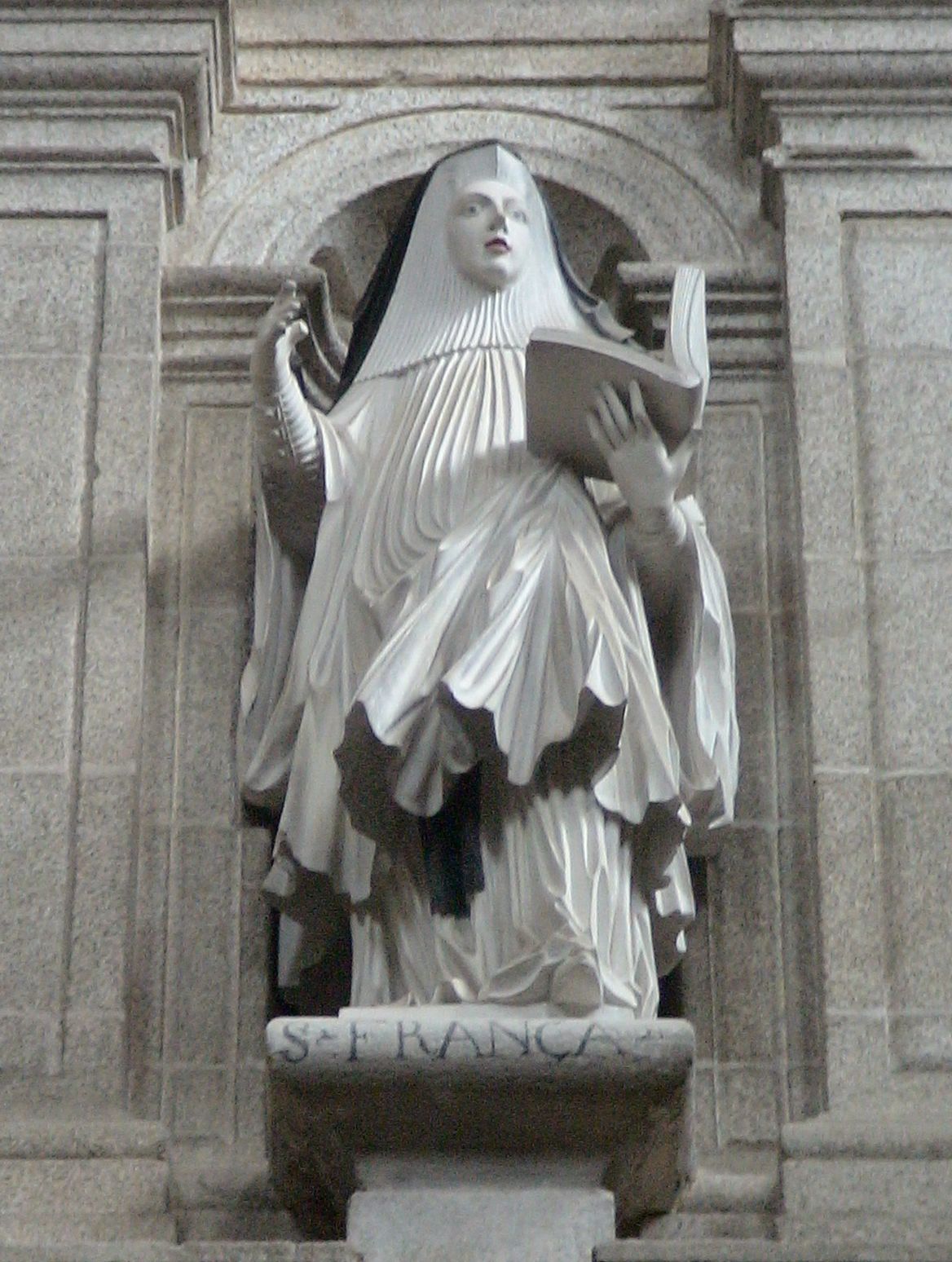
- Statue of Saint Franca in the Monastery of Arouca, Portugal

Virgin and Abbess
- Born: 25 April 1170; Piacenza, Italy
- Died: 25 April 1218; Pittoli, Italy
- Venerated in: Catholic Church
- Beatified: 21 March 1273
- Canonized: 21 September 1273 by Pope Gregory X
- Feast: 24 or 25 April
- Attributes: kneeling, crowned by Christ
- Patronage: against nightmares and eye disorders and diseases

Franca Visalta OCist (1170–1218), also known as Franca of Piacenza, was a Cistercian abbess and Catholic Saint.

Born in Piacenza, Italy, she became a Benedictine nun in St Syrus Convent at the age of seven and became abbess at a young age. However, she was removed and isolated because of the severe austerities she imposed. Only one nun, Carentia, agreed with Franca's discipline and she moved to a Cistercian convent in Rapallo.

Franca then persuaded her parents to build a Cistercian house in Montelana where she and Carentia both entered. Franca became abbess and maintained the strict austerities on herself, even when her health was failing, and spent most nights praying for several hours in chapel. She later moved the Cistercian community to Pittoli, where she died in 1218. Franca was canonised by Pope Gregory X.

== Bibliography ==
- Alban Butler (revised by Peter Doyle, ed. Paul Burns), Butler's Lives of the Saints: April new full edition (Tunbridge Wells, Kent, England: Burns and Oates 1999), p. 185.
- Acta Sanctorum Month of April Part 3, April 25, pp. 379–404..
