= 1252 =

1252 in various calendars
- Gregorian calendar: 1252; MCCLII
- Ab urbe condita: 2005
- Armenian calendar: 701; ԹՎ ՉԱ
- Assyrian calendar: 6002
- Balinese saka calendar: 1173–1174
- Bengali calendar: 658–659
- Berber calendar: 2202
- English Regnal year: 36 Hen. 3 – 37 Hen. 3
- Buddhist calendar: 1796
- Burmese calendar: 614
- Byzantine calendar: 6760–6761
- Chinese calendar: 辛亥年 (Metal Pig); 3949 or 3742 — to — 壬子年 (Water Rat); 3950 or 3743
- Coptic calendar: 968–969
- Discordian calendar: 2418
- Ethiopian calendar: 1244–1245
- Hebrew calendar: 5012–5013
- Hindu calendars
- Vikram Samvat: 1308–1309
- Shaka Samvat: 1173–1174
- Kali Yuga: 4352–4353
- Holocene calendar: 11252
- Igbo calendar: 252–253
- Iranian calendar: 630–631
- Islamic calendar: 649–650
- Japanese calendar: Kenchō 4 (建長４年)
- Javanese calendar: 1161–1162
- Julian calendar: 1252; MCCLII
- Korean calendar: 3585
- Minguo calendar: 660 before ROC 民前660年
- Nanakshahi calendar: −216
- Thai solar calendar: 1794–1795
- Tibetan calendar: ལྕགས་མོ་ཕག་ལོ་ (female Iron-Boar); 1378 or 997 or 225 — to — ཆུ་ཕོ་བྱི་བ་ལོ་ (male Water-Rat); 1379 or 998 or 226

Year 1252 (MCCLII) was a leap year starting on Monday of the Julian calendar.

== Events ==
=== By place ===
==== Europe ====
- April 6 – Saint Peter of Verona is assassinated by Carino of Balsamo.
- May 15 – Pope Innocent IV issues the papal bull Ad exstirpanda, which authorizes the torture of heretics in the Medieval Inquisition. Torture quickly gains widespread usage across Catholic Europe.
- June 1 – Alfonso X is proclaimed king of Castile and León.
- July – The settlement of Stockholm in Sweden is founded, by Birger Jarl.
- December 25 – Christopher I of Denmark is crowned King of Denmark, in the Lund Cathedral.
- The Polish land of Lebus is incorporated into the German state of Brandenburg, marking the start of Brandenburg's expansion into previously Polish areas (Neumark).
- The Lithuanian city of Klaipėda (Memel) is founded by the Teutonic Knights.
- The town and monastery of Orval Abbey in Belgium burn to the ground; rebuilding takes 100 years.
- Thomas Aquinas travels to the University of Paris, to begin his studies there for a master's degree.
- In astronomy, work begins on the recording of the Alfonsine tables.

==== Asia ====
- The classic Japanese text Jikkunsho is completed.
- The Chinese era Chunyou ends (→ Emperor Lizong).
- Mongol conquest of the Song dynasty: the Mongols take the westernmost province of the Song dynasty empire.
- New Mongol invasion of Tibet.

== Births ==
- March 25 – Conradin, Duke of Swabia (d. 1268)
- Safi-ad-din Ardabili, Persian Sufi leader
- Eleanor de Montfort, Princess of Wales, English-born consort (d. 1282)

== Deaths ==
- January 1 – Saint Zdislava Berka, Bohemian lay Dominican benefactress
- January 23 – Isabella, Queen of Armenia
- January – Bohemond V of Antioch
- February 3 – Sviatoslav III of Vladimir, Prince of Novgorod (b. 1196)
- April 1 – Kujō Michiie, Japanese regent
- April 6 – Saint Peter of Verona
- May 3 or May 4 – Günther von Wüllersleben, Grand Master of the Teutonic Knights
- May 30 – King Ferdinand III of Castile and Leon
- June 6 – Robert Passelewe, Bishop of Chichester
- June 9 – Otto I, Duke of Brunswick-Lüneburg
- June 29 – Abel, King of Denmark (b. 1218)
- August 1 – Giovanni da Pian del Carpine, Italian chronicler of the Mongol Empire
- November 27 – Blanche of Castile, queen of Louis VIII of France and regent of France (b. 1188)
- date unknown
  - John of Basingstoke, English scholar and ecclesiastic
  - Henry I, Count of Anhalt
  - Sorghaghtani Beki, Mongolian empress and regent
  - Catherine Sunesdotter, Swedish queen consort
  - Yesü Möngke, Khan of the Chagatai Khanate
