= Guillaume III des Porcellets =

French knight and lord

Guillaume III des Porcelets
- Born: 1217
- Died: 1288 (aged 71)
- Spouse: Raimonde de Falconis

Guillaume III des Porcellets (1217–1288) was a French knight and lord.

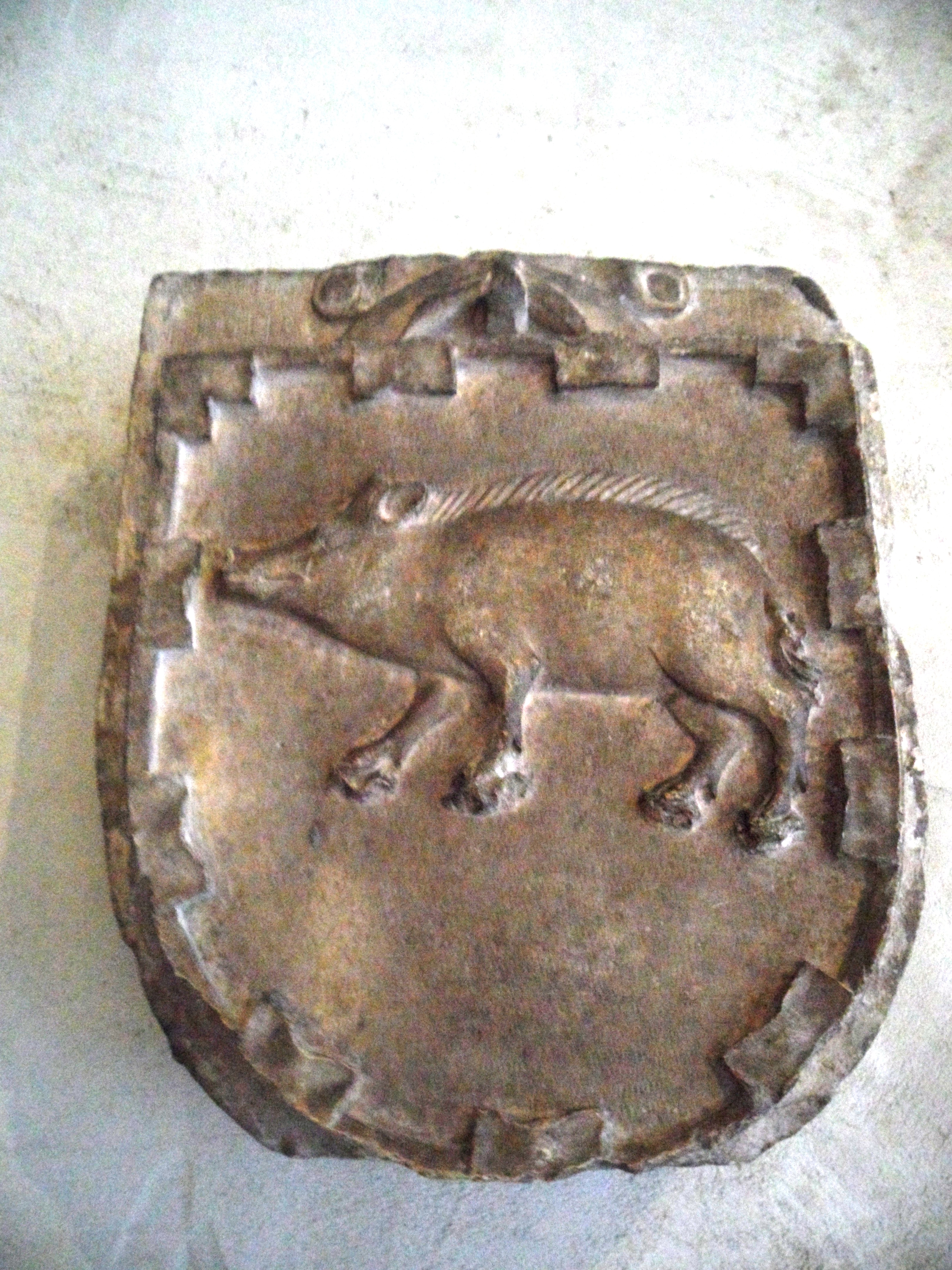
Coat of Arms with Boar Passant Charge of the Porcelet Family Provence The Cloister at Saint-Guilhem-le-Désert The Met Cloisters in Gallery 03

== Early life ==
Guillaume III des Porcellets was born in 1217.

== Career ==
He was a knight.

He was the Lord of parts of Arles, Fos, Martigues. He served as Conseiller d'Etat and Chamberlain to King Charles I of Naples. He served as the Baron of Sicily and Provence.

He was the only Frenchman to survive the Sicilian Vespers of 1282 when France lost Sicily to the rebels.

== Personal life ==
He married Raimonde de Falconis.

== Death ==
He died in 1288.
