= Umadevi =

Umadevi उमादेवी
- Died: 1218
- Spouse: Veera Ballala II

Umadevi (उमादेवी; c. 1150 – 1218) was one of the wives of King Veera Ballala II and a Mysore general during the Chalukya campaigns.

Born around 1150, Umadevi became one of the consort of Bellala II at age twenty-two. She commanded Mysore armies against the rival Chalukyas on at least two occasions, allowing Bellala to concentrate on administrative matters. Significantly contributing to the Hoysalas’ conquest of the Chalkyua at Kalyani (near present-day Bidar) in 1190, she eventually committed suicide, according to the Indian tradition of sati, following her husband's death in 1218.
