= 1150s =

Decade

The 1150s was a decade of the Julian Calendar which began on January 1, 1150, and ended on December 31, 1159.

== Events ==
=== 1150 ===
==== By place ====
====== Byzantine Empire ======
- Battle of Tara: The Byzantines defeat the Serbian-Hungarian army under Grdeša, count (župan) of Travunija, near the snow-covered Tara River. The Serbs are overpowered, and Grand Prince Uroš II is forced to accept the peace agreement made by Emperor Manuel I (Komnenos). Uroš is succeeded by his brother Desa, who becomes co-ruler of the Principality of Serbia (until 1153).

====== Levant ======
- Spring – Joscelin II, count of Edessa, on his way to Antioch is separated from his escort and falls into the hands of some Turcoman free-booters. Nur al-Din, ruler (atabeg) of Aleppo, heard of Joscelin's capture and sends a squadron of cavalry to take him from his captors. Joscelin is led before a hostile crowd and publicly blinded. Nur al-Din puts him in prison in the Citadel of Aleppo.
- Battle of Aintab: A Crusader army led by King Baldwin III repels the attacks of Nur al-Din near Aintab. Baldwin safely evacuates the Christian residents of the County of Edessa, which is captured by the Zangids.
- The city of Ascalon is fortified with 53 towers by order of the 17-year-old Caliph Al-Zafir, as it is the most strategic frontier fortress of the Fatimid Caliphate.

====== Europe ======
- February 8 – Battle of Flochberg: German forces under Henry VI defeat the army of the House of Welf at Bopfingen. At the same time, King Conrad III besieges Welf forces at Braunschweig in Saxony, but he lifts the siege when confronted by Henry the Lion.
- The University of Paris (known as the Sorbonne) is founded. The first doctorate degree is awarded in Paris.
- The city of Rinteln is founded on the northern bank of the Weser River in Lower Saxony (modern Germany).

====== Britain ======
- November 10 – Dryburgh Abbey located in the Scottish Borders is founded by Lord Hugh de Morville.
- Cubbie Roo's Castle is built on Wyre (Orkney Islands) and is first mentioned in the Orkneyinga Saga.
- Christchurch Priory located in Dorset is founded by Earl Baldwin de Redvers.
- The Irish Chronology (Chronicon Scotorum) is written (approximate date).

==== By topic ====
====== Religion ======
- The 15-year-old King Inge I (the Hunchback) of Norway calls for a meeting at Bergen of all religious leaders in anticipation that the English cardinal Nicholas Breakspear will find an archbishopric at Trondheim.
- Peter Lombard, a French scholastic theologian, publishes the Four Books of Sentences, which becomes the standard textbook of theology at the medieval universities.
- The temple at Angkor Wat ("Capital of Temples") is completed in the Khmer Empire (modern Cambodia).

=== 1151 ===
- September 7 – Geoffrey of Anjou dies, and is succeeded by his son Henry, aged 18.
- After the Battle of Ghazni, the city is burned by the Prince of Ghur.
- The first plague and fire insurance policy is issued in Iceland.
- Bolton Abbey is founded in North Yorkshire, England.
- Anping Bridge is completed in China's Fujian province. Its total length will not be exceeded until 1846.
- Confronted with internal strife, the commune of Bologna is the first Italian republic to turn to the rule of a podestà, Guido di Ranieri da Sasso (it ends in 1155).

=== 1152 ===
==== By place ====
====== Levant ======
- Spring – King Baldwin III and his mother, Queen Melisende, are called to intervene in a dispute between Baldwin's aunt Hodierna and her husband Raymond II, count of Tripoli. Hodierna decides to take a long holiday, and travels to Jerusalem, while Raymond escorts her out on the road southwards. On the way back to Tripoli, a group of Assassins stabs him to death at the southern gate of the city. The garrison rushes to arms and pours into the streets, slaying every Muslim in their way, but the Assassins manage to escape; the motive of their act is never known.
- Baldwin III demands more authority and blames Manasses, ruler of Ramla, for interfering with his legal succession as ruler of Jerusalem. He demands a second coronation from Patriarch Fulcher separated from Melisende. Fulcher refuses, and as a kind of self-coronation Baldwin parades through the city streets with laurel wreaths on his head. Before the High Court (Haute Cour) the decision is made to divide the kingdom into two districts.
- Baldwin III begins a civil war against Melisende and launches an invasion in the south. He captures the castle of Mirabel, which is defended by Manasses. Baldwin spares his life and is exiled, Nablus thereupon surrenders soon after. Melisende seeks refuge in the Tower of David with her younger son, the 16-year-old Amalric. Baldwin enters Jerusalem, he allows his mother to retain Nablus and the neighbourhood as her dower.
- Summer – Nur al-Din, Seljuk ruler (atabeg) of Aleppo, re-captures most of Crusader territory in the Orontes Valley – reducing the Principality of Antioch to little more than a narrow coastal strip along the Mediterranean. The County of Tripoli remains unchanged and Jerusalem remains a potential threat with ambitions to expand eastward, while also striving to dominate the Fatimid Caliphate in Egypt.

====== Europe ======
- February 15 – King Conrad III dies after a 14-year reign at Bamberg. He is succeeded by his 29-year-old nephew Frederick I (Barbarossa), duke of Swabia, who is crowned as King of the Germans at Aachen several days later, on March 9. Frederick becomes sole ruler of Germany and receives the royal insignia, despite the fact that Conrad has a 6-year-old son, Frederick IV, who becomes duke of Swabia.
- March 21 – King Louis VII repudiates his marriage to Eleanor of Aquitaine and has it annulled on grounds of misconduct and consanguinity – returning her lands and titles. Within 6 weeks, Eleanor re-marries Henry of Anjou, who had claimed the counties of Anjou and Maine, and the province of Touraine upon the death of his father Geoffrey Plantagenet (the Fair), the previous year. With the addition of Eleanor's lands, he now controls territory stretching unbroken, from Cherbourg to Bayonne.
- The town of Gorodets, located on the banks of the Volga River, is founded by Yuri Dolgorukiy, Grand Prince of Kiev.

====== England ======
- April 6 – King Stephen has his nobles swear fealty to his son Eustace, as the rightful heir of the English throne. Theobald, archbishop of Canterbury, and other bishops refuse to crown Eustace favouring Henry of Anjou to claim the throne instead. Stephen confiscates their property and Theobald is forced into exile in Flanders.
- Stephen besieges Newbury Castle and holds the young William as a hostage to ensure that his father, John Marshal, keeps his promise to surrender the castle. When John refuses to comply, Stephen threatened to have the young boy catapulted over the walls. After this, William remains a crown hostage for many months.

====== Africa ======
- The Almohad Caliphate conquers the Maghrib al-Awsat (modern Algeria). The city of Béjaïa becomes one of the main naval bases of the Almohads.

====== Mesoamerica ======
- Matlacohuatl becomes ruler of the city-state Azcapotzalco located in the Valley of Mexico (until 1222).

==== By topic ====
====== Religion ======
- Synod of Kells-Mellifont: The present diocesan system of Ireland is established (with later modifications), and the primacy of Armagh is recognized.
- The Archbishopric of Nidaros in the city of Nidaros (modern-day Trondheim) in Norway is established.

=== 1153 ===
==== By place ====
====== Byzantine Empire ======
- Spring – Andronikos I Komnenos, son of Isaac Komnenos, is imprisoned in the imperial palace for conspiring against his uncle, Emperor Manuel I (Komenenos) at Constantinople.

====== Levant ======
- August 19 – Siege of Ascalon: King Baldwin III of Jerusalem captures Ascalon, the last Fatimid fortress in Palestine. The citizens are allowed to leave in peace and return to Egypt.
- Raynald of Châtillon, a French nobleman, marries Constance of Antioch (after given permission by Baldwin III) and becomes Prince of Antioch.

====== Britain ======
- Spring – The 19-year-old Henry II of England lands with a Norman fleet (some 40 ships) on the south coast of England. He defeats King Stephen (a cousin of his mother, Queen Matilda) with a small army at Malmesbury. Henry travels north through the Midlands, while a temporary truce is accepted. Robert de Beaumont, 2nd Earl of Leicester, announces his support for the cause. Hoping to dethrone Stephen and replace him with Matilda.
- May 24 – King David I of Scotland dies after a 29-year reign at Carlisle Castle. He is succeeded by his grandson, the 12-year-old Malcolm IV (Virgo). Malcolm is the eldest son of Henry of Scotland, 3rd Earl of Huntingdon, who is crowned as ruler of Scotland at Scone Priory on May 27. Because of his young age, Donnchad (or Duncan) becomes Malcolm's regent and royal adviser.
- August – Stephen assemble troops to renew the siege of Wallingford Castle in a final attempt to take the stronghold. Henry of Anjou marches south to relieve the siege, arriving with a small army of mercenaries. He places Stephen's besieging troops under siege themselves. Stephen agrees to make a truce and accepts Henry as heir to the English throne.
- November 6 – The Treaty of Wallingford: Henry of Anjou and Stephen ratify the terms of a permanent peace under the direction of Archbishop Theobald of Bec. Ending the civil war (The Anarchy) – between England and Normandy after 18-years. The treaty grants the throne to Stephen for the duration of his life, but makes Henry the heir apparent.

====== Europe ======
- Confronted with important financial difficulty due to the expenses of the Spanish crusade, the Republic of Genoa has to sell a third of the city of Tortosa (which they had conquered in 1148 during an expedition against the Almoravids) to Ramon Berenguer IV, count of Barcelona.

====== Asia ======
- February 10 – Taira no Tadamori dies after a career in which he has used his military and diplomatic skills to subdue the pirates menacing commerce in the Seto Inland Sea. He expands trade with China and becomes the first samurai to serve Emperor Konoe as personal bodyguard. He is succeeded by his son Taira no Kiyomori, who assumes control of the Taira Clan. He establishes the first samurai-dominated government in Japan.

====== Africa ======
- King Roger II sends a Sicilian expedition under Admiral Philip of Mahdia to conquer Ifriqiya. With the support of Muslim troops, the Siculo-Normans suppress a rebellion on Djerba and invade the Kerkennah Islands.

==== By topic ====
====== Demography ======
- Estimation: Constantinople, capital of the Byzantine Empire, becomes the largest city of the world, taking the lead from Merv in the Seljuk Empire.

====== Religion ======
- July 8 – Pope Eugene III dies after a 8-year pontificate at Tivoli. He is succeeded by Anastasius IV as the 168th pope of the Catholic Church.
- Dhovemi, ruler of the Maldives, converts to Islam and adopts the Muslim title of Sultan Muhammad ibn Abdullah.

=== 1154 ===
==== By place ====
====== Levant ======
- April 18 – Nur al-Din, Seljuk ruler (atabeg) of Aleppo, encamps before Damascus and overthrows Mujir al-Din by force with support of the Jewish citizens, who open the eastern gate to the bulk of his army. Mujir flees to the citadel, but capitulates after only a few hours. He is offered his life and the Emirate of Homs. A few weeks later Mujir is suspected of plotting with old friends in Damascus and is exiled to Baghdad. Damascus is annexed to Zangid territory and all of Syria is unified under the authority of Nur al-Din, from Edessa in the north to the Hauran to the south.
- Nur al-Din establishes the Al-Nuri Hospital in Damascus. The hospital has outpatient consulting rooms, a conference room, prayer hall, vestibules and bathrooms.

====== Europe ======
- February 26 – King Roger II dies at Palermo after a 24-year reign. He is succeeded by his fourth son William I (the Bad) as ruler of Sicily. William appoints Maio of Bari, a man of low birth, to chancellor and his adviser. He pursues his father's policy of strengthening authority over the towns and the Italian nobles, who rally around his cousin Robert III, count of Loritello, in Apulia and Calabria.
- Autumn – King Frederick I (Barbarossa) leads an expedition into Italy for his imperial coronation. He wants to impose his will upon the towns and cities of Lombardy, a region long accustomed to interference from Germany. Frederick encounters stiff resistance to his authority, the Lombard nobles are unwilling to acknowledge his rule and the rights to raise taxes.
- The Almohad army conquers the last independent Muslim stronghold at Granada (modern Spain), after a six year siege.
- The Banate of Bosnia becomes an autonomous duchy as part of the Lands of the Hungarian Crown.
- Tallinn, the capital of Estonia, is first marked on the world map by Muhammad al-Idrisi.

====== Africa ======
- Normans conduct a series of raids in North Africa, including Annaba (modern Algeria) and the Nile Delta.

====== England ======
- October 25 – King Stephen dies after a short illness at Dover. He is succeeded by Henry of Anjou, the son of Queen Matilda.
- December 19 – The 21-year-old Henry II is crowned as sole ruler of England along with his wife Eleanor of Aquitaine.
- The Bull Ring, a commercial market centre, is founded by Peter de Bermingham at Birmingham.

==== By topic ====
====== Art and Culture ======
- January 15 – Muhammad al-Idrisi, Arab geographer and cartographer, completes his atlas of the world, the Tabula Rogeriana, which will remain one of the most accurate maps until the Age of Discovery.

====== Religion ======
- December 3 – Pope Anastasius IV dies after a 17-month pontificate. He is succeeded by Adrian IV (the only English pope in history) as the 169th pope of the Catholic Church.

=== 1155 ===
==== By place ====
====== Europe ======
- Siege of Tortona: April 18 - German forces capture the citadel of Tortona (after a two-month siege). The city is razed to the ground, including the graves.
- June 18 – King Frederick I (Barbarossa) is crowned as Emperor of the Holy Roman Empire by Pope Adrian IV at St. Peter's Basilica in Rome.
- Arnold of Brescia is exiled by Adrian IV and forced to flee. He is arrested by imperial forces; hanged and his body burned at the stake in Rome in June.
- The city of Bari rebels against King William I (the Bad) of Sicily and recognizes the Byzantine emperor, Manuel I (Komnenos), as its overlord.
- The Virgin of Vladimir (or Our Lady of Vladimir) is taken by Grand Prince Andrey Bogolyubsky to Vladimir from Suzdal.

====== England ======
- Spring – King Henry II has the Palace of Westminster (which is badly damaged by Stephen's supporters during The Anarchy) repaired. Thomas Becket, archbishop of Canterbury, is given the task of repairing the buildings.
- Henry II subdues the English nobles who have become too powerful during the civil war. He takes Bridgnorth Castle and Scarborough Castle.
- Henry II grants the city of Bristol (or Brycgstow) a Royal charter, and is divided between Gloucestershire and Somerset (until 1373).
- New Year's Day is changed from January 1 to March 25.

====== Asia ======
- August 22 – The 16-year-old Emperor Konoe dies after a 14-year reign. He is succeeded by his brother Go-Shirakawa as the 77th emperor of Japan.
- Jaisalmer Fort, located in the Indian state Rajasthan, is constructed by the Rajput ruler Rawal Jaisal (approximate date).

==== By topic ====
====== Religion ======
- A plan to conquer Ireland is approved by Adrian IV in a Papal Bull (a formal proclamation issued by the pope) called Laudabiliter. It gives Henry II lordship over Ireland, but the Irish kings resist English rule.
- Summer – (3/5 June) Robert of Chichester becomes bishop of Exeter (until 1160).

=== 1156 ===
==== By place ====
====== Levant ======
- Spring – Raynald of Châtillon, prince of Antioch, makes an alliance with Thoros II (the Great), ruler of Armenian Cilicia. He invades Cyprus and conducts a widespread plundering of the Byzantine island. The Crusaders and the Armenian forces march up and down the island robbing and pillaging every building, church and convent as well as shops and private houses. The crops are burnt; the herds are rounded up – together with all the population – and driven down to the coast. The massacre lasts about three weeks; on the rumor of a Byzantine fleet in the offing, Raynald gives the order for embarkation. The Crusader ships are loaded with booty, and every Cypriot is forced to ransom himself.

====== Europe ======
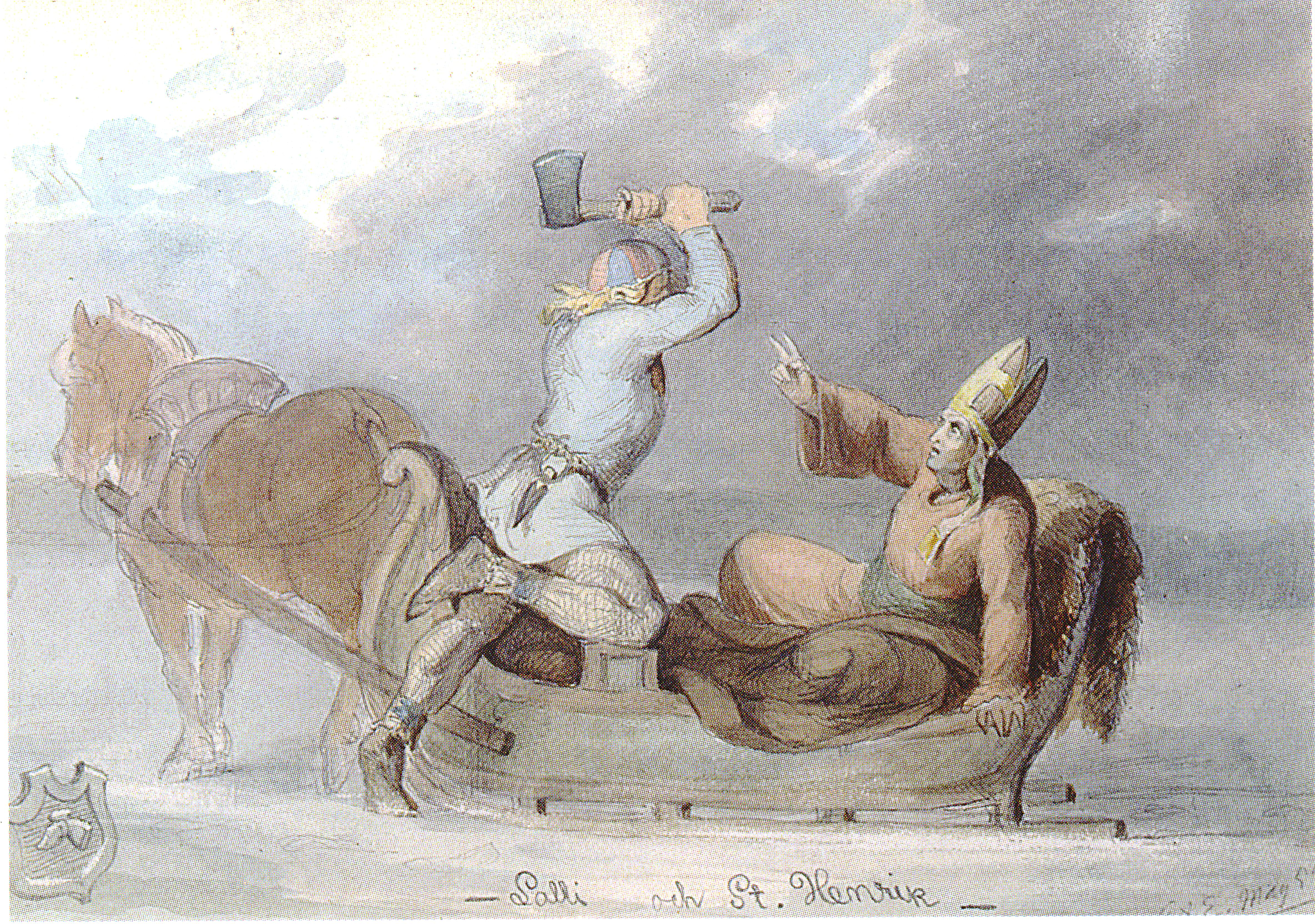
The murder of St. Henry by Lalli, painting by Karl Anders Ekman (1854)

- January 20 – Freeholder Lalli slays the English missionary-bishop Henry with an axe, on the ice of Lake Köyliönjärvi in Finland (according to legend).
- February – Domenico Morosini, doge of Venice (House of Morosini), dies after an 8-year reign. He is succeeded by Vitale II Michiel as ruler of Venice.
- May 28 – King William I (the Bad) lands with a Sicilian expeditionary force in Apulia. He defeats the Byzantine army at Brindisi and recaptures Bari.
- June 9 – Emperor Frederick I (Barbarossa) marries Beatrice I, daughter of Reginald III, adding the County of Burgundy to the Holy Roman Empire.
- June 18 – Pope Adrian IV comes to terms, and signs the Treaty of Benevento. He recognises the suzerainty of William I as ruler of Sicily and Italy.
- September 17 – Frederick I makes the Margraviate of Austria a duchy and gives the Babenberg Dynasty special privileges (the Privilegium Minus).
- Yuri Dolgorukiy, Grand Prince of Kiev, founds and fortifies the town of Moscow and erects a wooden Kremlin within the settlement (approximate date).
- December 25 – King Sverker I (the Elder) is murdered on his way to church. He is succeeded by his rival, Eric IX (the Holy), as ruler of Sweden.

====== Africa ======
- The independent city-state Sfax revolts against Norman occupation. Almohad forces conquer the city and massacre the Christian citizens.

====== Asia ======
- July 28 – The Hōgen rebellion, a dispute between Emperor Go-Shirakawa and his half-brother retired-Emperor Sutoku, erupts in Japan.

==== By topic ====
====== Art and Science ======
- Mosan artists create the Stavelot Triptych, a masterpiece of Goldsmithing, as a reliquary to house purported pieces of the True Cross.

=== 1157 ===
- January 12–March 16 – Caliph Al-Muqtafi successfully defends Baghdad against the coalition forces of Sultan Muhammad of Hamadan, and Atabeg Qutb-adin of Mosul.
- Albert I of Brandenburg begins his ruthless program to pacify the Slavic region.
- June 11 – Albert I of Brandenburg, also called The Bear (Ger: Albrecht der Bär), becomes the founder of the Margraviate of Brandenburg, Germany and the first Margrave.
- July – Henry II launches a campaign against Owain Gwynedd in north Wales. Although Owain defeats him at the Battle of Ewloe he eventually submits to Henry and pays homage.
- August 12 – The 1157 Hama earthquake takes place after a year of foreshocks. Its name is taken from the city of Hama, in west-central Syria (then under Seljuk rule), where the most casualties are sustained.
- August 21 – Sancho III and Ferdinand II, the sons of King Alfonso VII of Castile, divide his kingdom between them upon his death.
- October 23 – Battle of Grathe Heath: A civil war in Denmark ends with the death of King Sweyn III. Valdemar I of Denmark becomes king of all Denmark, and restores and rebuilds the country.
- Henry II of England grants special trading privileges to the Hansa merchants of Cologne in London who lend him money at interest.
- Henry II of England grants a charter to the merchants of Lincoln (approximate date).
- Nur ad-Din Zengi besieges the Knights Hospitaller in the crusader fortress of Banyas, routs a relief army led by King Baldwin III of Jerusalem, and takes Grand Master Bertrand de Blanquefort prisoner.

=== 1158 ===
==== By place ====
====== Byzantine Empire ======
- Autumn – Emperor Manuel I Komnenos sets out from Constantinople at the head of an expeditionary army. He marches to Cilicia; and while the main army follows the coast road eastwards Manuel hurries ahead with a force of only 500 cavalry. He manages to surprise Thoros II "the Great", lord of the Armenian Kingdom of Cilicia, who participated in the attack on Cyprus in 1156. Thoros flees into the mountains and Cilicia is occupied by the Byzantines.

====== Europe ======
- January 11 – Vladislav II becomes king of Bohemia. He is crowned by Frederick Barbarossa, Holy Roman Emperor, with a diadem (called by the chroniclers a diadema or circulus). Vladislaus is also invested with Upper Lusatia, and accompanies Frederick to Milan to suppress the rebellion in Lombardy (northern Italy).
- The Diet of Roncaglia is convoked by Frederick I. He mobilises an army of 100,000 men and leaves in June for a second Italian expedition – accompanied by Henry the Lion and his Saxon forces. He crosses the Alps and lays siege to Milan. German forces capture the city from the rebels after a short siege. However Milan soon rebels again, with Empress Beatrice taken captive and forced into parading on a donkey.
- Summer – King Henry II of England travels to France to meet King Louis VII and propose a marriage between his three-year-old son Henry and Louis' daughter Margaret (less than a year old). She is shipped to England, as the future wife and queen. The Vexin region is promised to Margaret as dowry and is put under the care of the Knights Templar, until her future husband is old enough to take control of it.
- August 31 – King Sancho III ("the Desired") dies after a 1-year reign. He is succeeded as ruler of Castile by his 2-year-old son Alfonso VIII ("the Noble"). The noble houses of Lara and Castro claim the regency, as the boy's uncle, Ferdinand II (ruler of León and Galicia).
- Raymond of Fitero, Spanish monk and abbot, pledges to defend the fortress of Calatrava (guarding the roads to Córdoba and Toledo) from incoming Muslim raiders. It is the founding moment of the Order of Calatrava, the spearhead of the Iberian armies during the Reconquista.
- Portuguese forces, led by King Afonso I of Portugal ("the Great"), conquer Pamela, Alcácer do Sal and Sesimbra from the diminished Almoravids.
- 12-year-old William Marshal is sent from England to the Château de Tancarville in Normandy to be brought up in the household of William de Tancarville, a cousin of William's mother. He begins his training as a knight; this also includes academic studies, practical lessons in chivalry and courtly life, and warfare and combat (using wooden swords and spears).
- Welsh forces under Ifor Bach ("Ivor the Short") attack Cardiff Castle and kidnap William Fitz Robert, Norman lord of Glamorgan, along with his family.

====== Asia ======
- September 5 – Emperor Go-Shirakawa of Japan abdicates the throne after a 3-year reign. He is succeeded by his 15-year-old son Nijō as the 77th emperor. Go-Shirakawa retains power, and gives Kiyomori Taira a higher position to lead a samurai-dominated government.

==== By topic ====
====== Economy ======
- To restore confidence in the English currency, Henry II mints a new penny (known to specialists as the Tealby penny) with his own image.

====== Education ======
- The University of Bologna is granted its first privileges by Frederick I.

====== Religion ======
- The Roman Catholic Diocese of Derry is founded in Ireland.

=== 1159 ===
- September 7 – Pope Alexander III succeeds Pope Adrian IV, as the 170th pope.
- Taira no Kiyomori leaves Kyōto on a personal pilgrimage, giving Fujiwara no Nobuyori and his Minamoto allies the perfect chance to stage an uprising.
- Tunis is reconquered from the Normans, by the Almohad caliphs.
- (Approximate date): Churchman Richard FitzNeal is appointed Lord High Treasurer in England, in charge of Henry II of England's Exchequer, an office he will hold for almost 40 years.

== Significant people ==
- Pope Eugene III
- Pope Adrian IV
- Al-Muqtafi

== Births ==
1150

- January 26 – Fakhr al-Din al-Razi, Persian polymath (d. 1210)
- October 8 – Narapatisithu, ruler of the Pagan Kingdom (d. 1211)
- Agnes of Loon, German duchess and regent (d. 1191)
- Albert de Rethel, Flemish clergyman and priest (d. 1195)
- Alix of France, French countess and regent (d. 1197)
- André de Chauvigny, French nobleman (d. 1202)
- Azalaïs of Montferrat, Italian noblewoman (d. 1232)
- Baldwin V, count of Hainaut and Flanders (d. 1195)
- Geoffrey of Villehardouin, French knight (d. 1213)
- Gerald FitzMaurice, Norman nobleman (d. 1204)
- Gruffydd Fychan ap Iorwerth, Welsh knight (d. 1221)
- Henry de Longchamp, English High Sheriff (d. 1212)
- Henryk Kietlicz, archbishop of Gniezno (d. 1219)
- Hermann Joseph, German priest and mystic (d. 1241)
- Honorius III, pope of the Catholic Church (d. 1227)
- Hugh II of Saint Omer, prince of Galilee (d. 1204)
- John Comyn, archbishop of Dublin (approximate date)
- John de Courcy (or Courci), Norman knight (d. 1219)
- Judah ben Samuel, German Jewish rabbi (d. 1217)
- Leo I (or Levon), king of Armenian Cilicia (d. 1219)
- Minamoto no Noriyori, Japanese general (d. 1193)
- Otto I, count of Guelders and Zutphen (d. 1207)
- Qutb al-Din Aibak, ruler of the Delhi Sultanate (d. 1210)
- Ramon I, Catalonian nobleman (approximate date)
- Robert IV, French nobleman and Grand Master (d. 1193)
- Rosamund Clifford, English noblewoman (d. 1176)
- Stephen Langton, English archbishop (d. 1228)
- Theodore Apsevdis, Byzantine painter (d. 1215)
- Umadevi, Indian queen and general (d. 1218)
- William de Braose, English nobleman (d. 1211)
- Wincenty Kadłubek, bishop of Kraków (d. 1223)
- Ye Shi, Chinese scholar and philosopher (d. 1223)

1151

- April 3 – Igor Svyatoslavich, Russian prince (d. 1202)
- May 9 – al-Adid, last Fatimid caliph (d. 1171)
- Unkei, Japanese sculptor (d. 1223)

1152

- May 10 – Gangjong, Korean ruler of Goryeo (d. 1213)
- David of Scotland, Scottish prince (d. 1219)
- Diego López II, Spanish nobleman (d. 1214)
- Geoffrey, illegitimate son of Henry II (d. 1212)
- Han Tuozhou, Chinese statesman (d. 1207)
- Imai Kanehira, Japanese general (d. 1184)
- James of Avesnes, French nobleman (d. 1191)
- Maria Komnene, Byzantine princess (d. 1182)
- Patrick I, Scottish nobleman (approximate date)
- Roger IV, duke of Apulia and Calabria (d. 1161)
- Roman Mstislavich, Kievan prince (d. 1205)
- Taira no Tomomori, Japanese nobleman (d. 1185)

1153

- August 17 – William IX, count of Poitiers (d. 1156)
- Abu Mohammed Salih, Almohad Sufi leader (d. 1234)
- Aimery of Cyprus (or Amaury), king of Jerusalem (d. 1205)
- Alexios III (Angelos), Byzantine emperor (d. 1211)
- Cathal Crobhdearg Ua Conchobair, Irish king (d. 1224)
- Fujiwara no Kanefusa, Japanese nobleman (d. 1217)
- Harvey I of Léon, Breton nobleman and knight (d. 1203)
- Ibn Hammad, Hammadid historian and writer (d. 1230)
- Kamo no Chōmei, Japanese author and poet (d. 1216)
- Marco I Sanudo, duke of the Archipelago (d. 1227)
- Nerses of Lambron, Armenian archbishop (d. 1198)
- Richard de Clare, 3rd Earl of Hertford (d. 1217)
- Sibylla of Acerra, queen and regent of Sicily (d. 1205)
- Waleran de Beaumont, 4th Earl of Warwick (d. 1204)
- William II (the Good), king of Sicily (d. 1189)

1154

- November 2 – Constance I, queen of Sicily (d. 1198)
- November 11 – Sancho I, king of Portugal (d. 1211)
- Agnes of Austria, queen of Hungary (d. 1182)
- Benoît de Sainte-Maure, French poet (d. 1173)
- Kyŏng Tae-sŭng, Korean military leader (d. 1183)
- Minamoto no Yoshinaka, Japanese general (d. 1184)
- Muzaffar al-Din Gökböri, Ayyubid general (d. 1233)
- Robert II, count of Dreux and Braine (d. 1218)
- Sohrevardi, Persian philosopher (d. 1191)
- Vsevolod III, Grand Prince of Kiev (d. 1212)

1155

- February 28 – Henry the Young King, son of Henry II (d. 1183)
- May 17 – Jien, Japanese poet and historian (d. 1225)
- November 11 – Alfonso VIII, king of Castile (d. 1214)
- Abu Muhammad Salih, Almohad Sufi leader (d. 1234)
- Benkei, Japanese warrior monk (sōhei) (d. 1189)
- Bernard d'Armagnac, French nobleman (d. 1202)
- Fujiwara no Ariie, Japanese nobleman (d. 1216)
- Fujiwara no Yasuhira, Japanese nobleman (d. 1189)
- Geoffrey de Saye, English nobleman (d. 1230)
- Kamo no Chōmei, Japanese waka poet (d. 1216)
- Maud de Braose, English noblewoman (d. 1210)
- Ottokar I, duke of Bohemia (approximate date)
- Sicard of Cremona, Italian prelate (d. 1215)
- Taira no Tokuko, Japanese empress (d. 1214)

1156

- January 6 – Matilda of England, daughter of Henry II (d. 1189)
- October 27 – Raymond VI, French nobleman (d. 1222)
- Abu Said al-Baji, Almohad Sufi scholar (d. 1231)
- Gaucelm Faidit, French troubadour (d. 1209)
- Hōjō Masako, Japanese noblewoman (d. 1225)
- Isaac II Angelos, Byzantine emperor (d. 1204)
- Magnus V Erlingsson, king of Norway (d. 1184)
- Robert of Auxerre, French chronicler (d. 1212)
- Sayf al-Din al-Amidi, Ayyubid jurist (d. 1233)
- Zhang Congzheng, Chinese physician (d. 1228)

1157

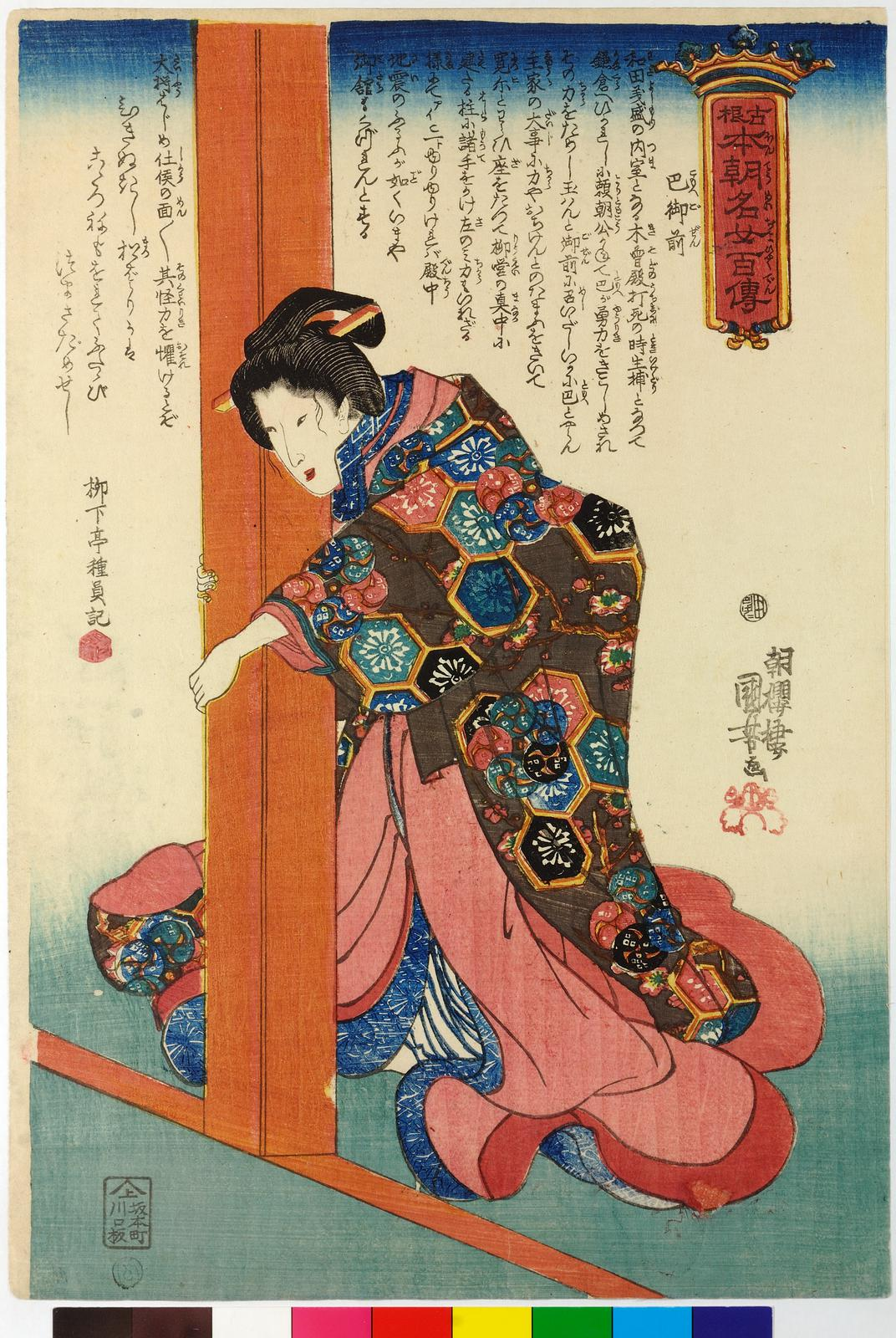
Tomoe Gozen

- September 8 – King Richard I of England (d. 1199)
- Alexander Neckham, English scholar, teacher, theologian and abbot of Cirencester Abbey (d. 1217)
- Leopold V of Austria, Duke of Austria from 1177 and Duke of Styria from 1192 until his death (d. 1194)
- Margaret of France, Queen of England and Hungary, Queen of England by marriage to Henry the Young King and queen of Hungary and Croatia by marriage to Béla III of Hungary (d. 1197)
- Tomoe Gozen, female Samurai warrior and military leader (d. 1247)

1158

- August 6 – Al-Nasir li-Din Allah, Abbasid caliph (d. 1225)
- September 23 – Geoffrey II, duke of Brittany (d. 1186)
- Albert I ("the Proud"), margrave of Meissen (d. 1195)
- Baldwin of Bethune, French nobleman (d. 1212)
- Ermengol VIII (or Armengol), count of Urgell (d. 1208)
- Fujiwara no Ietaka, Japanese waka poet (d. 1237)
- Giordano Forzatè, Italian religious leader (d. 1248)
- Henry I, Count of Bar, French nobleman and knight (d. 1190)
- Henry I, Duke of Mödling ("the Elder"), German nobleman (d. 1223)
- Jinul (or Chinul), Korean Zen master (d. 1210)
- Margaret of France, Queen of England and Hungary, daughter of Louis VII of France (d. 1197)
- Philip of Dreux, bishop of Beauvais (d. 1217)
- Satō Tsugunobu, Japanese warrior (d. 1185)
- Taira no Shigehira, Japanese general (d. 1185)
- Theobald I, Count of Bar, French nobleman and knight (d. 1214)
- Valdemar Knudsen, Danish bishop (d. 1236)
- Yvette of Huy, Belgian anchoress (d. 1228)

1159

- Minamoto no Yoshitsune, Japanese general (d. 1189)

== Deaths ==
1150

- January 9 – Xi Zong, Chinese emperor of the Jin Dynasty (b. 1119)
- March 20 – Simon of Worcester, bishop of Worcester
- April 8 – Gertrude of Babenberg, German duchess (b. 1118)
- August 27 – Guarinus of Sitten, French bishop (b. 1065)
- September 16 – Sibylla of Burgundy, queen of Sicily (b. 1126)
- November 12 – Hartbert van Bierum, bishop of Utrecht
- November 21 – García IV (the Restorer), king of Navarre
- December 16 – Raynald of Bar, French abbot
- Barisan of Ibelin (the Old), French nobleman
- Henry VI (Berengar), co-ruler of Germany
- Hervé de Bourg-Dieu, French biblical scholar
- Ibn Masal, Fatimid general, official and vizier
- Jabir ibn Aflah, Andalusian astronomer (b. 1100)
- Kjeld (or Ketil), Danish clergyman and saint
- Reinward, bishop of Meissen (approximate date)
- Renier de Huy, Flemish goldsmith and sculptor
- Robert de Sigello, English bishop and chancellor
- Suryavarman II, ruler of the Khmer Empire
- Teobaldo Roggeri, Italian shoemaker (b. 1100)
- William the Simple, French nobleman (b. 1085)

1151

- January 13 – Abbot Suger, French statesman and historian (b. c. 1081)
- April 23 – Adeliza of Louvain, queen of Henry I of England (b. 1103)
- September 7 – Geoffrey V, Count of Anjou (b. 1113)
- Li Qingzhao, Chinese poet (b. 1084)

1152

- January 8 – Conrad I, German nobleman (b. 1090)
- January 18 – Albero de Montreuil, German archbishop
- February 15 – Conrad III, king of Italy and Germany
- May 3 – Matilda of Boulogne, queen of England
- June 12 – Henry of Scotland, heir apparent to the throne of Scotland
- August 1 – Albrecht I, German bishop of Meissen
- September 13 – Ghiyath ad-Din Mas'ud, Seljuk sultan
- October 12 – Adolf III, count Berg and Hövel (b. 1080)
- October 14 – Ralph I (or Raoul), French nobleman
- October 24 – Jocelin of Soissons, French theologian
- November 13 – William of St. Barbe, Norman bishop
- Adelard of Bath, English philosopher (b. 1080)
- Gilbert FitzRichard de Clare, 1st Earl of Hertford
- Nicholas IV, patriarch of Constantinople (b. 1070)
- Raymond II (or Raimundus), count of Tripoli
- Robert of Selby, English governor and chancellor
- Theobald II (the Great), French nobleman (b. 1090)
- Theophanes Kerameus, Italian bishop (b. 1129)
- Thethmar (or Theodemar), German missionary
- Volodymyrko Volodarovych, Galician prince (b. 1104)

1153

- January 28 – Pelagius of Oviedo, Spanish bishop
- February 10 – Taira no Tadamori, Japanese samurai (b. 1096)
- April 16 – Piotr Włostowic, Polish nobleman (b. 1080)
- May 22 – Atto of Pistoia, Portuguese bishop (b. 1070)
- May 24 – David I, king of Scotland (b. 1084)
- June 12 – Roger de Beaumont, 2nd Earl of Warwick
- June 29 – Óláfr Guðrøðarson, king of the Isles
- July 8 – Eugene III, pope of the Catholic Church
- August 16 – Bernard de Tremelay, French Grand Master
- August 17 – Eustace IV, count of Boulogne (b. 1130)
- August 20 – Bernard of Clairvaux, French abbot (b. 1090)
- September 3 – Henry I, German archbishop (b. 1080)
- October 14 – Henry Murdac, English archbishop
- December 16 – Ranulf de Gernon, Norman nobleman (b. 1099)
- Al-Shahrastani, Persian scholar and historian (b. 1086)
- Anna Komnene, Byzantine princess and historian (b. 1083)
- Gampopa, Tibetan Buddhist monk and teacher (b. 1079)
- Shaykh Tabarsi, Persian Shia scholar and writer (b. 1073)
- Simon II de Senlis, 4th Earl of Huntingdon (b. 1098)
- Walter Espec, Norman nobleman and High Sheriff

1154

- February 2 – Viacheslav I, Grand Prince of Kiev (b. 1083)
- February 20 – Wulfric of Haselbury, English miracle worker
- February 26 – Roger II, king of Sicily (b. 1095)
- March 8 – Stephen of Obazine, French priest (b. 1085)
- April 1 or April 15 – Al-Zafir, Fatimid caliph (b. 1133)
- April 3 – Al-Adil ibn al-Sallar, Fatimid vizier
- June 8 – William of York, English archbishop
- June 9 – Geoffrey of Canterbury, English abbot
- July 20 – Bernard of Hildesheim, German bishop
- July 21 – Elizabeth of Hungary, Polish duchess
- September 4 – Gilbert de la Porrée, French theologian
- October 25 – Stephen, king of England (b. 1096)
- November 13 – Iziaslav II, Grand Prince of Kiev
- November 18 – Adelaide of Maurienne, French queen (b. 1092)
- December 3 – Anastasius IV, pope of the Catholic Church
- December 12 – Vicelinus, German bishop (b. 1086)
- Donnchad I (or Duncan), Scottish nobleman (b. 1113)
- Ermengol IV (el de Castilla), count of Urgell (b. 1096)
- Faidiva of Toulouse, countess of Savoy (b. 1133)
- Hiyya al-Daudi, Andalusian rabbi and composer
- Honorius Augustodunensis, French theologian
- Jinadattasuri, Indian Jain poet and writer (b. 1075)
- Lawrence of Durham, English prelate and poet
- Lambert of Bauduen, bishop of Vence (b. 1084)
- Matilda of Anjou, duchess of Normandy (b. 1106)
- Zhang Jun, Chinese general and official (b. 1086)

1155

- June 4 – Baldwin de Redvers, English nobleman
- June 10 – Sigurd II, king of Norway (b. 1133)
- June 11 – Kenkai, Japanese Buddhist monk (b. 1107)
- August 22 – Konoe, emperor of Japan (b. 1139)
- November 18 – Qin Hui, Chinese politician (b. 1090)
- Arnold of Brescia, Italian priest and rebel (b. 1090)
- Fujiwara no Akisuke, Japanese nobleman (b. 1090)
- Geoffrey of Monmouth, English historian (b. 1095)
- Li Qingzhao, Chinese poet and writer (b. 1084)
- Minamoto no Yoshikuni, Japanese samurai (b. 1082)
- William de Mohun, English nobleman (b. 1090)

1156

- January 17 – André de Montbard, French nobleman
- January 20 – Henry, English bishop and missionary
- January 31 – Herman van Horne, bishop of Utrecht
- July 20 – Toba, Japanese emperor (b. 1103)
- August 4 – Otto IV, German nobleman (b. 1083)
- August 12 – Blanca of Navarre, queen of Castile
- November 20 – Henry I, German nobleman (b. 1115)
- December 2 – William IX, count of Poitiers (b. 1153)
- December 25
  - Peter the Venerable, French monk and abbot
  - Sverker I (the Elder), king of Sweden
- Atsiz, Persian ruler of the Khwarazmian Empire
- Domenico Morosini, doge of Venice (House of Morosini)
- Fujiwara no Sadanobu, Japanese calligrapher (b. 1088)
- Fujiwara no Taishi, Japanese empress (b. 1095)
- Fujiwara no Yorinaga, Japanese statesman (b. 1120)
- Gilbert de Gant, English nobleman (b. 1126)
- Li Qingzhao, Chinese female poet (b. 1084)
- Mas'ud I, Seljuk ruler of the Sultanate of Rum
- Minamoto no Tameyoshi, Japanese general (b. 1096)
- Tairrdelbach Ua Conchobair, Irish king (b. 1088)

1157

- January 24 or January 25 – Agnes of Babenberg, Politically active High Duchess consort of Poland (b. 1111)
- May 8 – Ahmed Sanjar, Great Seljuk Sultan (b. 1084 or 1086)
- May 15 – Yury Dolgoruky, Russian prince (b. c. 1099)
- August 21 – King Alfonso VII of Castile (b. 1105)
- October 23 – King Sweyn III of Denmark (b.c. 1125) (in battle)
- date unknown – King Eystein II of Norway (b.c. 1125)

1158

- April 26 – Martirius, archbishop of Esztergom
- July 19 – Wibald, German monk and abbot (b. 1098)
- July 27 – Geoffrey VI, count of Nantes (b. 1134)
- August 20 – Rögnvald Kali Kolsson, Earl of Orkney
- August 31 – Sancho III, king of Castile (b. 1134)
- September 22 – Otto of Freising, German bishop (b. 1114)
- December 15 – Frederick II, German archbishop
- Abu Jafar ibn Atiyya, Almohad vizier and writer
- Anselm of Havelberg, German bishop (b. 1100)
- Barthélemy de Jur, French bishop (b. 1080)
- Oda of Brabant, Belgian prioress and saint
- Thorbjorn Thorsteinsson, Norwegian pirate

1159

- May 30 – Wladislaus II, the Exile of Poland (b. 1105)
- August 29 – Bertha of Sulzbach, Byzantine Empress (b. 1110s)
- September 1 – Pope Adrian IV (b. c. 1100)
- October 11 – William of Blois, Count of Boulogne and Earl of Surrey (b. c. 1137)
- Joscelin II, Count of Edessa
