= 1158 =

1158 in various calendars
Gregorian calendar	1158; MCLVIII
Ab urbe condita	1911
Armenian calendar	607; ԹՎ ՈԷ
Assyrian calendar	5908
Balinese saka calendar	1079–1080
Bengali calendar	564–565
Berber calendar	2108
English Regnal year	4 Hen. 2 – 5 Hen. 2
Buddhist calendar	1702
Burmese calendar	520
Byzantine calendar	6666–6667
Chinese calendar	丁丑年 (Fire Ox); 3855 or 3648 — to — 戊寅年 (Earth Tiger); 3856 or 3649
Coptic calendar	874–875
Discordian calendar	2324
Ethiopian calendar	1150–1151
Hebrew calendar	4918–4919
- Hindu calendars
Vikram Samvat	1214–1215
Shaka Samvat	1079–1080
Kali Yuga	4258–4259
Holocene calendar	11158
Igbo calendar	158–159
Iranian calendar	536–537
Islamic calendar	552–553
Japanese calendar	Hōgen 3 (保元３年)
Javanese calendar	1064–1065
Julian calendar	1158; MCLVIII
Korean calendar	3491
Minguo calendar	754 before ROC 民前754年
Nanakshahi calendar	−310
Seleucid era	1469/1470 AG
Thai solar calendar	1700–1701
Tibetan calendar	མེ་མོ་གླང་ལོ་ (female Fire-Ox); 1284 or 903 or 131 — to — ས་ཕོ་སྟག་ལོ་ (male Earth-Tiger); 1285 or 904 or 132

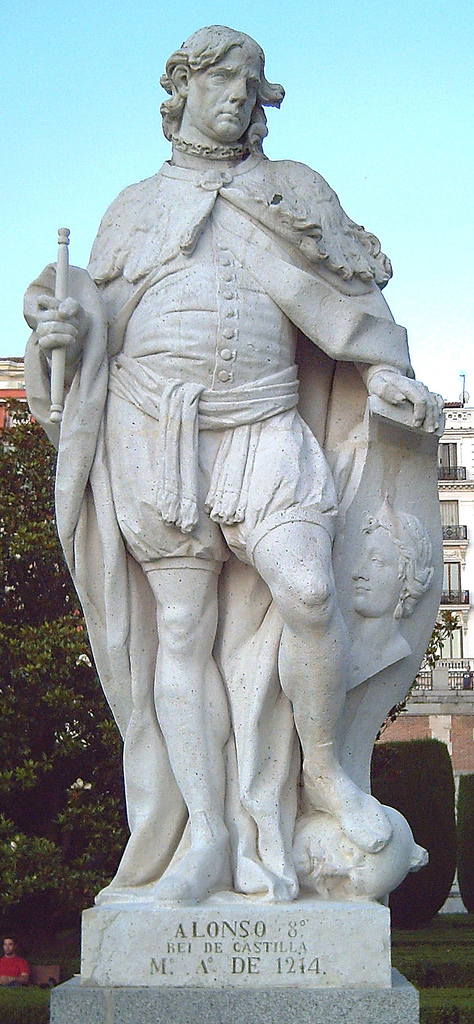
Statue of Alfonso VIII who at age 2 in 1158 succeeded to the throne of Castile

Year 1158 (MCLVIII) was a common year starting on Wednesday of the Julian calendar.

== Events ==
=== By place ===
==== Byzantine Empire ====
- Autumn – Emperor Manuel I Komnenos sets out from Constantinople at the head of an expeditionary army. He marches to Cilicia; and while the main army follows the coast road eastwards Manuel hurries ahead with a force of only 500 cavalry. He manages to surprise Thoros II "the Great", lord of the Armenian Kingdom of Cilicia, who participated in the attack on Cyprus in 1156. Thoros flees into the mountains and Cilicia is occupied by the Byzantines.

==== Europe ====
- January 11 – Vladislav II becomes king of Bohemia. He is crowned by Frederick Barbarossa, Holy Roman Emperor, with a diadem (called by the chroniclers a diadema or circulus). Vladislaus is also invested with Upper Lusatia, and accompanies Frederick to Milan to suppress the rebellion in Lombardy (northern Italy).
- The Diet of Roncaglia is convoked by Frederick I. He mobilises an army of 100,000 men and leaves in June for a second Italian expedition – accompanied by Henry the Lion and his Saxon forces. He crosses the Alps and lays siege to Milan. German forces capture the city from the rebels after a short siege. However Milan soon rebels again, with Empress Beatrice taken captive and forced into parading on a donkey.
- Summer – King Henry II of England travels to France to meet King Louis VII and propose a marriage between his three-year-old son Henry and Louis' daughter Margaret (less than a year old). She is shipped to England, as the future wife and queen. The Vexin region is promised to Margaret as dowry and is put under the care of the Knights Templar, until her future husband is old enough to take control of it.
- August 31 – King Sancho III ("the Desired") dies after a 1-year reign. He is succeeded as ruler of Castile by his 2-year-old son Alfonso VIII ("the Noble"). The noble houses of Lara and Castro claim the regency, as the boy's uncle, Ferdinand II (ruler of León and Galicia).
- Raymond of Fitero, Spanish monk and abbot, pledges to defend the fortress of Calatrava (guarding the roads to Córdoba and Toledo) from incoming Muslim raiders. It is the founding moment of the Order of Calatrava, the spearhead of the Iberian armies during the Reconquista.
- Portuguese forces, led by King Afonso I of Portugal ("the Great"), conquer Pamela, Alcácer do Sal and Sesimbra from the diminished Almoravids.
- 12-year-old William Marshal is sent from England to the Château de Tancarville in Normandy to be brought up in the household of William de Tancarville, a cousin of William's mother. He begins his training as a knight; this also includes academic studies, practical lessons in chivalry and courtly life, and warfare and combat (using wooden swords and spears).
- Welsh forces under Ifor Bach ("Ivor the Short") attack Cardiff Castle and kidnap William Fitz Robert, Norman lord of Glamorgan, along with his family.

==== Asia ====
- September 5 – Emperor Go-Shirakawa of Japan abdicates the throne after a 3-year reign. He is succeeded by his 15-year-old son Nijō as the 77th emperor. Go-Shirakawa retains power, and gives Kiyomori Taira a higher position to lead a samurai-dominated government.

=== By topic ===
==== Economy ====
- To restore confidence in the English currency, Henry II mints a new penny (known to specialists as the Tealby penny) with his own image.

==== Education ====
- The University of Bologna is granted its first privileges by Frederick I.

==== Religion ====
- The Roman Catholic Diocese of Derry is founded in Ireland.

== Births ==
- August 6 – Al-Nasir li-Din Allah, Abbasid caliph (d. 1225)
- September 23 – Geoffrey II, duke of Brittany (d. 1186)
- Albert I ("the Proud"), margrave of Meissen (d. 1195)
- Baldwin of Bethune, French nobleman (d. 1212)
- Ermengol VIII (or Armengol), count of Urgell (d. 1208)
- Fujiwara no Ietaka, Japanese waka poet (d. 1237)
- Giordano Forzatè, Italian religious leader (d. 1248)
- Henry I, Count of Bar, French nobleman and knight (d. 1190)
- Henry I, Duke of Mödling ("the Elder"), German nobleman (d. 1223)
- Jinul (or Chinul), Korean Zen master (d. 1210)
- Margaret of France, Queen of England and Hungary, daughter of Louis VII of France (d. 1197)
- Philip of Dreux, bishop of Beauvais (d. 1217)
- Satō Tsugunobu, Japanese warrior (d. 1185)
- Taira no Shigehira, Japanese general (d. 1185)
- Theobald I, Count of Bar, French nobleman and knight (d. 1214)
- Valdemar Knudsen, Danish bishop (d. 1236)
- Yvette of Huy, Belgian anchoress (d. 1228)

== Deaths ==
- April 26 – Martirius, archbishop of Esztergom
- July 19 – Wibald, German monk and abbot (b. 1098)
- July 27 – Geoffrey VI, count of Nantes (b. 1134)
- August 20 – Rögnvald Kali Kolsson, Earl of Orkney
- August 31 – Sancho III, king of Castile (b. 1134)
- September 22 – Otto of Freising, German bishop (b. 1114)
- December 15 – Frederick II, German archbishop
- Abu Jafar ibn Atiyya, Almohad vizier and writer
- Anselm of Havelberg, German bishop (b. 1100)
- Barthélemy de Jur, French bishop (b. 1080)
- Oda of Brabant, Belgian prioress and saint
- Thorbjorn Thorsteinsson, Norwegian pirate
