= 1155 =

1155 in various calendars
- Gregorian calendar: 1155; MCLV
- Ab urbe condita: 1908
- Armenian calendar: 604; ԹՎ ՈԴ
- Assyrian calendar: 5905
- Balinese saka calendar: 1076–1077
- Bengali calendar: 561–562
- Berber calendar: 2105
- English Regnal year: 1 Hen. 2 – 2 Hen. 2
- Buddhist calendar: 1699
- Burmese calendar: 517
- Byzantine calendar: 6663–6664
- Chinese calendar: 甲戌年 (Wood Dog); 3852 or 3645 — to — 乙亥年 (Wood Pig); 3853 or 3646
- Coptic calendar: 871–872
- Discordian calendar: 2321
- Ethiopian calendar: 1147–1148
- Hebrew calendar: 4915–4916
- Hindu calendars
- Vikram Samvat: 1211–1212
- Shaka Samvat: 1076–1077
- Kali Yuga: 4255–4256
- Holocene calendar: 11155
- Igbo calendar: 155–156
- Iranian calendar: 533–534
- Islamic calendar: 549–550
- Japanese calendar: Kyūju 2 (久寿２年)
- Javanese calendar: 1061–1062
- Julian calendar: 1155; MCLV
- Korean calendar: 3488
- Minguo calendar: 757 before ROC 民前757年
- Nanakshahi calendar: −313
- Seleucid era: 1466/1467 AG
- Thai solar calendar: 1697–1698
- Tibetan calendar: ཤིང་ཕོ་ཁྱི་ལོ་ (male Wood-Dog); 1281 or 900 or 128 — to — ཤིང་མོ་ཕག་ལོ་ (female Wood-Boar); 1282 or 901 or 129

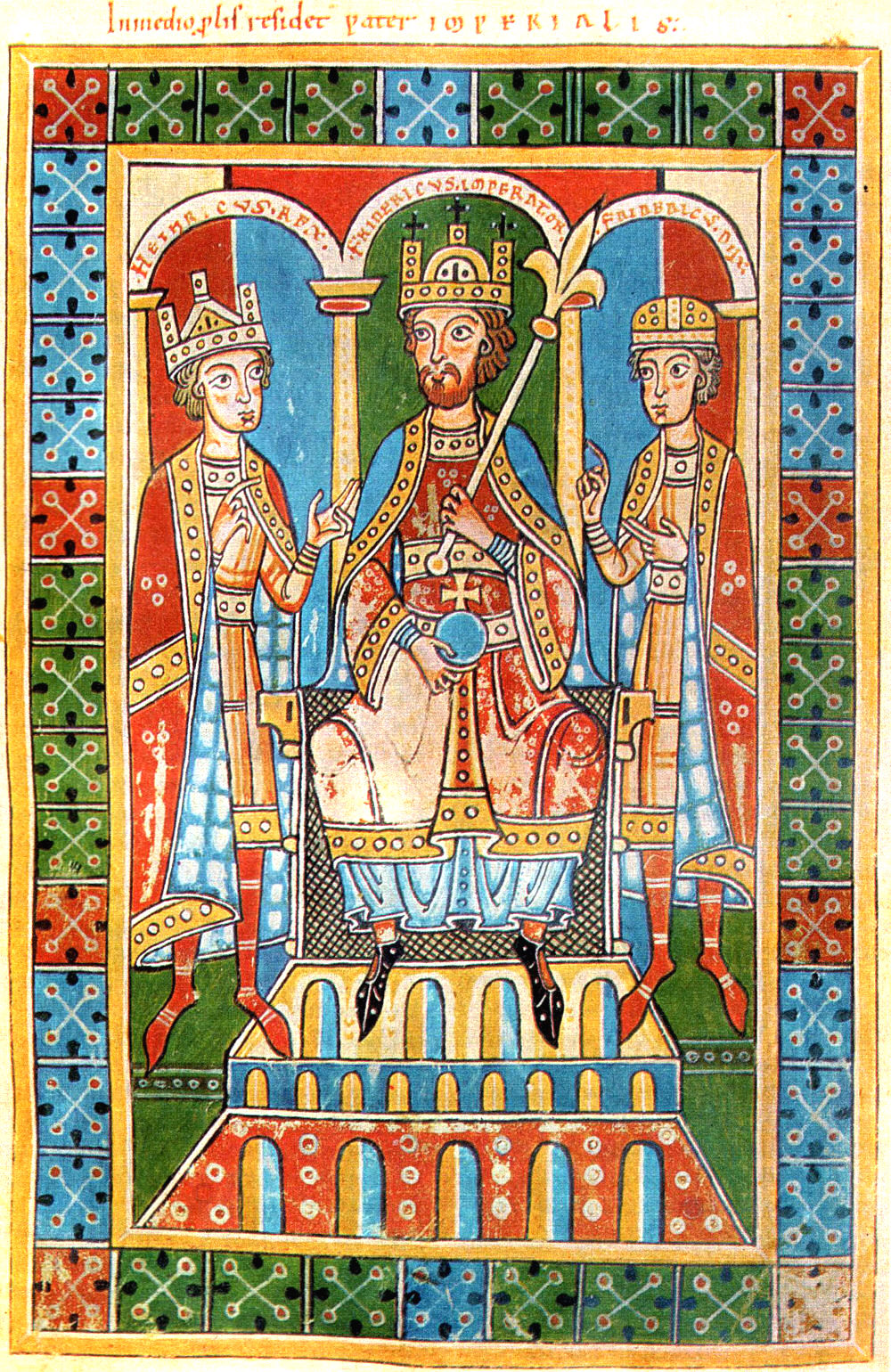
Emperor Frederick I (middle) flanked by his two sons, Henry VI and Frederick VI.

Year 1155 (MCLV) was a common year starting on Saturday of the Julian calendar.

== Events ==
=== By place ===
==== Europe ====
- April 18 – Siege of Tortona: German forces capture the citadel of Tortona (after a two-month siege). The city is razed to the ground, including the graves.
- June 18 – King Frederick Barbarossa is crowned as Holy Roman Emperor by Pope Adrian IV at St. Peter's Basilica in Rome.
- Arnold of Brescia is exiled by Adrian IV and forced to flee. He is arrested by imperial forces, hanged, and his body burned at the stake in Rome in June.
- The city of Bari rebels against King William I ("the Bad") of Sicily and recognizes the Byzantine emperor Manuel I Komnenos as its overlord.
- The Virgin of Vladimir icon is taken by Grand Prince Andrey Bogolyubsky to Vladimir from Suzdal.

==== England ====
- Spring – King Henry II has the Palace of Westminster (which is badly damaged by Stephen's supporters during The Anarchy) repaired. Thomas Becket, archbishop of Canterbury, is given the task of repairing the buildings.
- Henry II subdues the English nobles who have become too powerful during the civil war. He takes Bridgnorth Castle and Scarborough Castle.
- Henry II grants the city of Bristol ('Brycgstow') a royal charter, and is divided between Gloucestershire and Somerset (until 1373).
- New Year's Day is changed from January 1 to March 25.

==== Asia ====
- August 22 – The 16-year-old Emperor Konoe dies after a 14-year reign. He is succeeded by his brother Go-Shirakawa as the 77th emperor of Japan.
- Jaisalmer Fort, located in the Indian state Rajasthan, is constructed by the Rajput ruler Rawal Jaisal (approximate date).

=== By topic ===
==== Religion ====
- A plan to conquer Ireland is approved by Adrian IV in a Papal bull (a formal proclamation issued by the pope) called Laudabiliter. It gives Henry II lordship over Ireland, but the Irish kings resist English rule.
- Summer (June 3/5) – Robert of Chichester becomes bishop of Exeter (until 1160).

== Births ==
- February 28 – Henry the Young King, son of Henry II (d. 1183)
- May 17 – Jien, Japanese poet and historian (d. 1225)
- November 11 – Alfonso VIII, king of Castile (d. 1214)
- Abu Muhammad Salih, Almohad Sufi leader (d. 1234)
- Benkei, Japanese warrior monk (sōhei) (d. 1189)
- Bernard d'Armagnac, French nobleman (d. 1202)
- Fujiwara no Ariie, Japanese nobleman (d. 1216)
- Fujiwara no Yasuhira, Japanese nobleman (d. 1189)
- Geoffrey de Saye, English nobleman (d. 1230)
- Kamo no Chōmei, Japanese waka poet (d. 1216)
- Maud de Braose, English noblewoman (d. 1210)
- Ottokar I, duke of Bohemia (approximate date)
- Sicard of Cremona, Italian prelate (d. 1215)
- Taira no Tokuko, Japanese empress (d. 1214)

== Deaths ==
- June 4 – Baldwin de Redvers, English nobleman
- June 10 – Sigurd II, king of Norway (b. 1133)
- June 11 – Kenkai, Japanese Buddhist monk (b. 1107)
- August 22 – Konoe, emperor of Japan (b. 1139)
- November 18 – Qin Hui, Chinese politician (b. 1090)
- Arnold of Brescia, Italian priest and rebel (b. 1090)
- Fujiwara no Akisuke, Japanese nobleman (b. 1090)
- Geoffrey of Monmouth, English historian (b. 1095)
- Li Qingzhao, Chinese poet and writer (b. 1084)
- Minamoto no Yoshikuni, Japanese samurai (b. 1082)
- William de Mohun, English nobleman (b. 1090)
