= 1152 =

1152 in various calendars
- Gregorian calendar: 1152; MCLII
- Ab urbe condita: 1905
- Armenian calendar: 601; ԹՎ ՈԱ
- Assyrian calendar: 5902
- Balinese saka calendar: 1073–1074
- Bengali calendar: 558–559
- Berber calendar: 2102
- English Regnal year: 17 Ste. 1 – 18 Ste. 1
- Buddhist calendar: 1696
- Burmese calendar: 514
- Byzantine calendar: 6660–6661
- Chinese calendar: 辛未年 (Metal Goat); 3849 or 3642 — to — 壬申年 (Water Monkey); 3850 or 3643
- Coptic calendar: 868–869
- Discordian calendar: 2318
- Ethiopian calendar: 1144–1145
- Hebrew calendar: 4912–4913
- Hindu calendars
- Vikram Samvat: 1208–1209
- Shaka Samvat: 1073–1074
- Kali Yuga: 4252–4253
- Holocene calendar: 11152
- Igbo calendar: 152–153
- Iranian calendar: 530–531
- Islamic calendar: 546–547
- Japanese calendar: Ninpei 2 (仁平２年)
- Javanese calendar: 1058–1059
- Julian calendar: 1152; MCLII
- Korean calendar: 3485
- Minguo calendar: 760 before ROC 民前760年
- Nanakshahi calendar: −316
- Seleucid era: 1463/1464 AG
- Thai solar calendar: 1694–1695
- Tibetan calendar: ལྕགས་མོ་ལུག་ལོ་ (female Iron-Sheep); 1278 or 897 or 125 — to — ཆུ་ཕོ་སྤྲེ་ལོ་ (male Water-Monkey); 1279 or 898 or 126

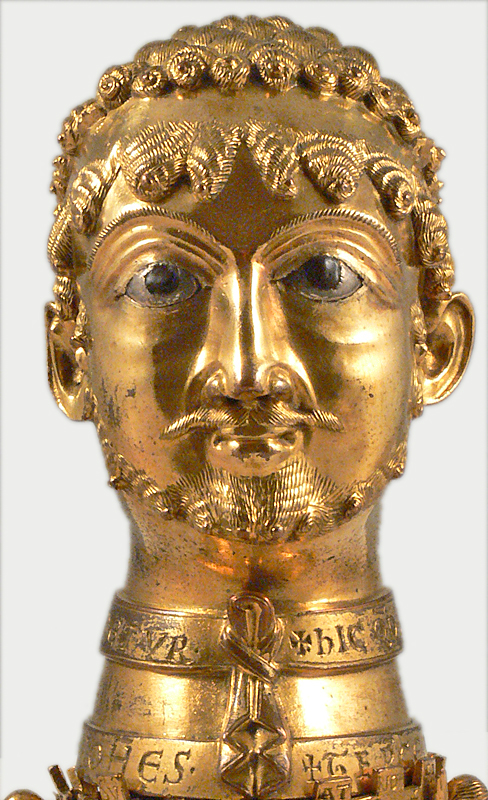
Bust of King Frederick I (1122–1190)

Year 1152 (MCLII) was a leap year starting on Tuesday of the Julian calendar.

== Events ==
=== By place ===
==== Levant ====
- Spring – King Baldwin III and his mother, Queen Melisende, are called to intervene in a dispute between Baldwin's aunt Hodierna and her husband Raymond II, count of Tripoli. Hodierna decides to take a long holiday, and travels to Jerusalem, while Raymond escorts her out on the road southwards. On the way back to Tripoli, a group of Assassins stabs him to death at the southern gate of the city. The garrison rushes to arms and pours into the streets, slaying every Muslim in their way, but the Assassins manage to escape; the motive of their act is never known.
- Baldwin III demands more authority and blames Manasses, ruler of Ramla, for interfering with his legal succession as ruler of Jerusalem. He demands a second coronation from Patriarch Fulcher separated from Melisende. Fulcher refuses, and as a kind of self-coronation Baldwin parades through the city streets with laurel wreaths on his head. Before the High Court (Haute Cour) the decision is made to divide the kingdom into two districts.
- Baldwin III begins a civil war against Melisende and launches an invasion in the south. He captures the castle of Mirabel, which is defended by Manasses. Baldwin spares his life and is exiled, Nablus thereupon surrenders soon after. Melisende seeks refuge in the Tower of David with her younger son, the 16-year-old Amalric. Baldwin enters Jerusalem, he allows his mother to retain Nablus and the neighbourhood as her dower.
- Summer – Nur al-Din, Seljuk ruler (atabeg) of Aleppo, re-captures most of Crusader territory in the Orontes Valley – reducing the Principality of Antioch to little more than a narrow coastal strip along the Mediterranean. The County of Tripoli remains unchanged and Jerusalem remains a potential threat with ambitions to expand eastward, while also striving to dominate the Fatimid Caliphate in Egypt.

==== Europe ====
- February 15 – King Conrad III dies after a 14-year reign at Bamberg. He is succeeded by his 29-year-old nephew Frederick I (Barbarossa), duke of Swabia, who is crowned as King of the Germans at Aachen several days later, on March 9. Frederick becomes sole ruler of Germany and receives the royal insignia, despite the fact that Conrad has a 6-year-old son, Frederick IV, who becomes duke of Swabia.
- March 21 – King Louis VII repudiates his marriage to Eleanor of Aquitaine and has it annulled on grounds of misconduct and consanguinity – returning her lands and titles. Within 6 weeks, Eleanor re-marries Henry of Anjou, who had claimed the counties of Anjou and Maine, and the province of Touraine upon the death of his father Geoffrey Plantagenet (the Fair), the previous year. With the addition of Eleanor's lands, he now controls territory stretching unbroken, from Cherbourg to Bayonne.
- The town of Gorodets, located on the banks of the Volga River, is founded by Yuri Dolgorukiy, Grand Prince of Kiev.

==== England ====
- April 6 – King Stephen has his nobles swear fealty to his son Eustace, as the rightful heir of the English throne. Theobald, archbishop of Canterbury, and other bishops refuse to crown Eustace favouring Henry of Anjou to claim the throne instead. Stephen confiscates their property and Theobald is forced into exile in Flanders.
- Stephen besieges Newbury Castle and holds the young William as a hostage to ensure that his father, John Marshal, keeps his promise to surrender the castle. When John refuses to comply, Stephen threatened to have the young boy catapulted over the walls. After this, William remains a crown hostage for many months.

==== Africa ====
- The Almohad Caliphate conquers the Maghrib al-Awsat (modern Algeria). The city of Béjaïa becomes one of the main naval bases of the Almohads.

==== Mesoamerica ====
- Matlacohuatl becomes ruler of the city-state Azcapotzalco located in the Valley of Mexico (until 1222).

=== By topic ===
==== Religion ====
- Synod of Kells-Mellifont: The present diocesan system of Ireland is established (with later modifications), and the primacy of Armagh is recognized.
- The Archbishopric of Nidaros in the city of Nidaros (modern-day Trondheim) in Norway is established.

== Births ==
- May 10 – Gangjong, Korean ruler of Goryeo (d. 1213)
- David of Scotland, Scottish prince (d. 1219)
- Diego López II, Spanish nobleman (d. 1214)
- Geoffrey, illegitimate son of Henry II (d. 1212)
- Han Tuozhou, Chinese statesman (d. 1207)
- Imai Kanehira, Japanese general (d. 1184)
- James of Avesnes, French nobleman (d. 1191)
- Maria Komnene, Byzantine princess (d. 1182)
- Patrick I, Scottish nobleman (approximate date)
- Roger IV, duke of Apulia and Calabria (d. 1161)
- Roman Mstislavich, Kievan prince (d. 1205)
- Taira no Tomomori, Japanese nobleman (d. 1185)

== Deaths ==
- January 8 – Conrad I, German nobleman (b. 1090)
- January 18 – Albero de Montreuil, German archbishop
- February 15 – Conrad III, king of Italy and Germany
- May 3 – Matilda of Boulogne, queen of England
- June 12 – Henry of Scotland, heir apparent to the throne of Scotland
- August 1 – Albrecht I, German bishop of Meissen
- September 13 – Ghiyath ad-Din Mas'ud, Seljuk sultan
- October 12 – Adolf III, count Berg and Hövel (b. 1080)
- October 14 – Ralph I (or Raoul), French nobleman
- October 24 – Jocelin of Soissons, French theologian
- November 13 – William of St. Barbe, Norman bishop
- Adelard of Bath, English philosopher (b. 1080)
- Gilbert FitzRichard de Clare, 1st Earl of Hertford
- Nicholas IV, patriarch of Constantinople (b. 1070)
- Raymond II (or Raimundus), count of Tripoli
- Robert of Selby, English governor and chancellor
- Theobald II (the Great), French nobleman (b. 1090)
- Theophanes Kerameus, Italian bishop (b. 1129)
- Thethmar (or Theodemar), German missionary
- Volodymyrko Volodarovych, Galician prince (b. 1104)
