= Jerusalemite Civil War =

Date	1152
Location	Kingdom of Jerusalem
Result	Baldwin III's victory

Belligerents
Baldwin III’s army	Melisende’s army

Jerusalemite Civil War was a civil war in the Kingdom of Jerusalem between Baldwin III of Jerusalem and his mother, Melisende, Queen of Jerusalem during 1152.

== Events ==
Since 1143 and the death of Fulk, King of Jerusalem, the kingdom has been governed by his widow Melisende, regent in the name of her son Baldwin III.

The latter came of age at the beginning of 1152 and was to be crowned on Easter Day (March 30, 1152) and Melisende thought she would be crowned at his side. Baldwin decided otherwise and presented himself alone at the ceremony and, despite the reluctance of the clergy, received the crown alone.

== Consequences ==
The Latin states of the East were emerging from a period of weakness, with the Kingdom of Jerusalem, the Principality of Antioch and the County of Tripoli all three governed by a regent and the County of Edessa gradually reconquered by the Turks. The prestige of Baldwin III emerged strengthened from this war, and he was able in the following years to coordinate the defense of these states against the attacks of the Muslim emirs of Syria.
