= Minamoto no Michitomo =

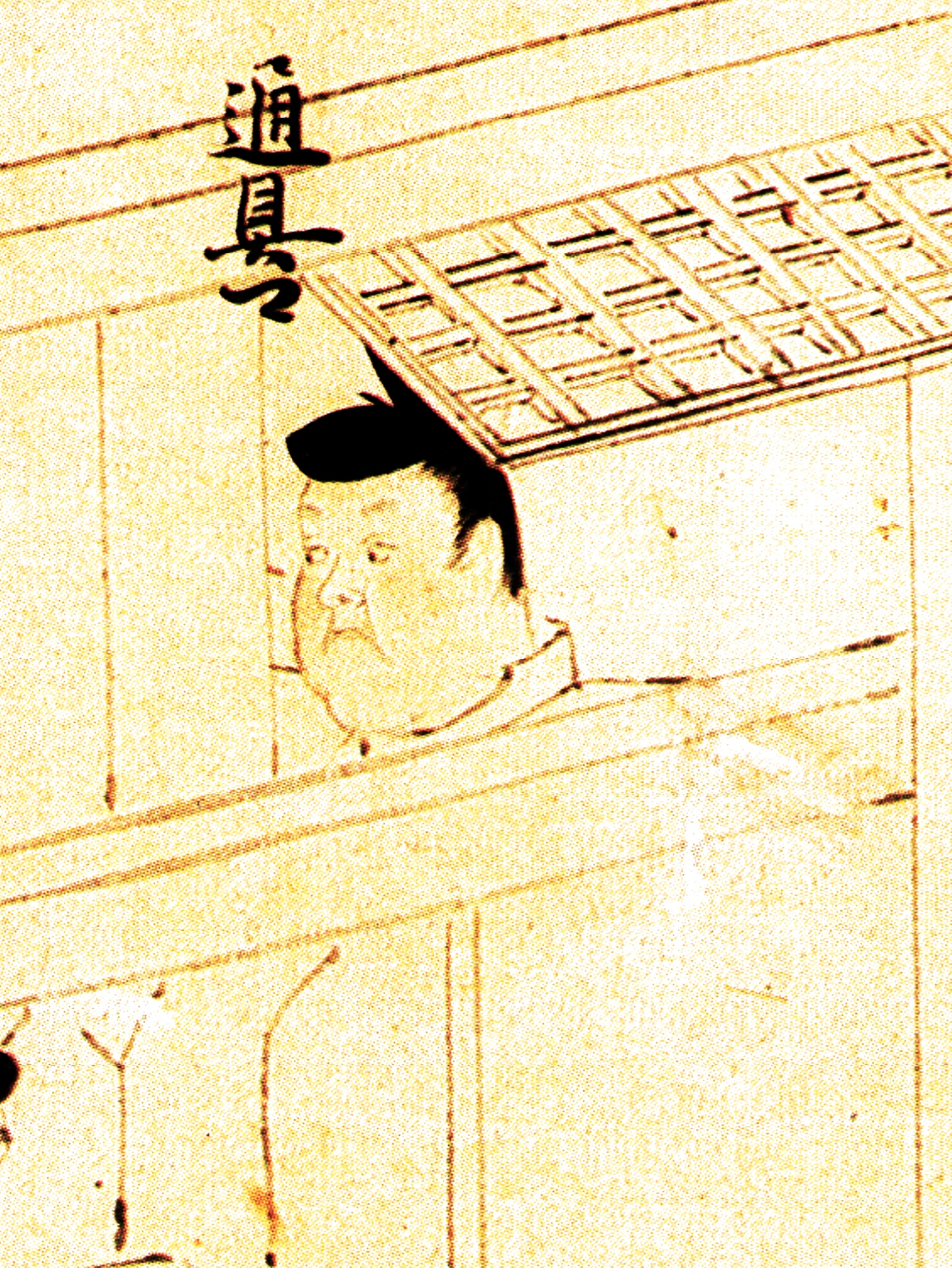

Minamoto no Michitomo (源通具, Minamoto no Michitomo, 1171 - 1227) was a waka poet and Japanese nobleman active in the early Kamakura period. He was the son of Minamoto no Michichika and the foster father of the monk Dōgen. He is designated as a member of the New Thirty-Six Immortals of Poetry (新三十六歌仙, Shinsanjūrokkasen). He is also known as Horikawa Michitomo and Horikawa Dainagon (堀川大納言).

Alongside Fujiwara no Ariie, Fujiwara no Teika, Jakuren, Fujiwara no Ietaka and Asukai Masatsune he worked on the compilation of the Shin Kokin Wakashū.
