= 1156 =

1156 in various calendars
- Gregorian calendar: 1156; MCLVI
- Ab urbe condita: 1909
- Armenian calendar: 605; ԹՎ ՈԵ
- Assyrian calendar: 5906
- Balinese saka calendar: 1077–1078
- Bengali calendar: 562–563
- Berber calendar: 2106
- English Regnal year: 2 Hen. 2 – 3 Hen. 2
- Buddhist calendar: 1700
- Burmese calendar: 518
- Byzantine calendar: 6664–6665
- Chinese calendar: 乙亥年 (Wood Pig); 3853 or 3646 — to — 丙子年 (Fire Rat); 3854 or 3647
- Coptic calendar: 872–873
- Discordian calendar: 2322
- Ethiopian calendar: 1148–1149
- Hebrew calendar: 4916–4917
- Hindu calendars
- Vikram Samvat: 1212–1213
- Shaka Samvat: 1077–1078
- Kali Yuga: 4256–4257
- Holocene calendar: 11156
- Igbo calendar: 156–157
- Iranian calendar: 534–535
- Islamic calendar: 550–551
- Japanese calendar: Kyūju 3 / Hōgen 1 (保元元年)
- Javanese calendar: 1062–1063
- Julian calendar: 1156; MCLVI
- Korean calendar: 3489
- Minguo calendar: 756 before ROC 民前756年
- Nanakshahi calendar: −312
- Seleucid era: 1467/1468 AG
- Thai solar calendar: 1698–1699
- Tibetan calendar: ཤིང་མོ་ཕག་ལོ་ (female Wood-Boar); 1282 or 901 or 129 — to — མེ་ཕོ་བྱི་བ་ལོ་ (male Fire-Rat); 1283 or 902 or 130

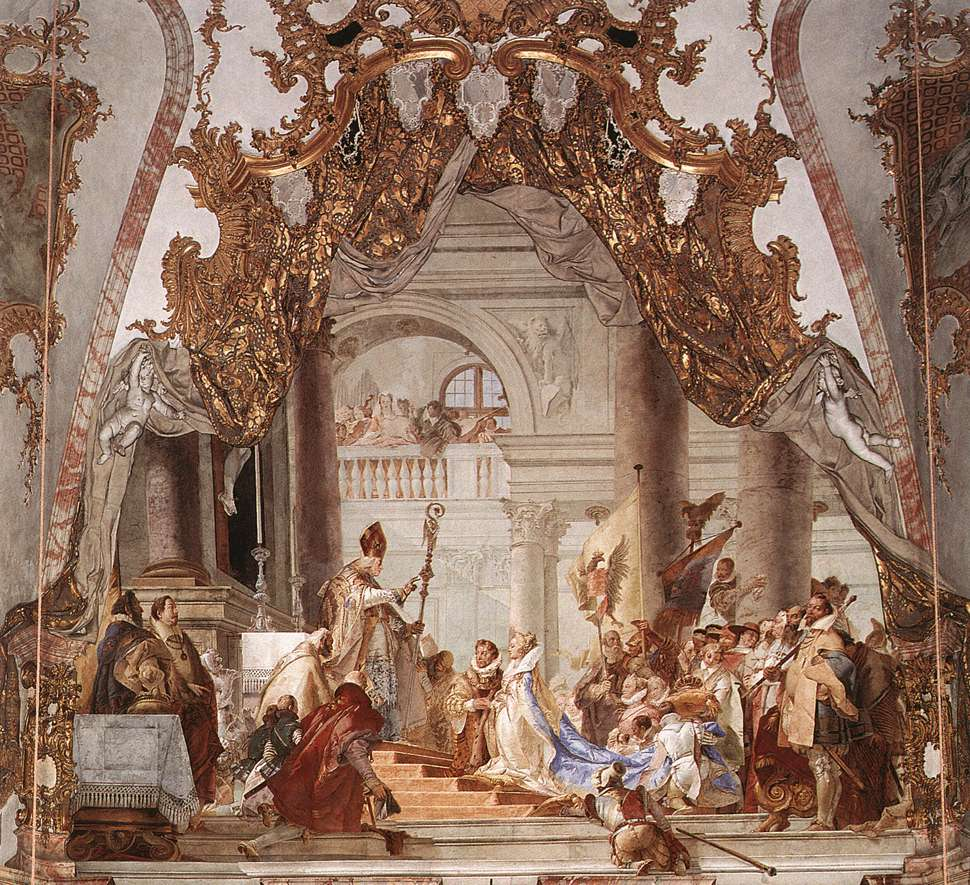
Emperor Frederick I marries Beatrice I

Year 1156 (MCLVI) was a leap year starting on Sunday of the Julian calendar.

== Events ==
=== By place ===
==== Levant ====
- Spring – Raynald of Châtillon, prince of Antioch, makes an alliance with Thoros II (the Great), ruler of Armenian Cilicia. He invades Cyprus and conducts a widespread plundering of the Byzantine island. The Crusaders and the Armenian forces march up and down the island robbing and pillaging every building, church and convent as well as shops and private houses. The crops are burnt; the herds are rounded up – together with all the population – and driven down to the coast. The massacre lasts about three weeks; on the rumor of a Byzantine fleet in the offing, Raynald gives the order for embarkation. The Crusader ships are loaded with booty, and every Cypriot is forced to ransom himself.

==== Europe ====
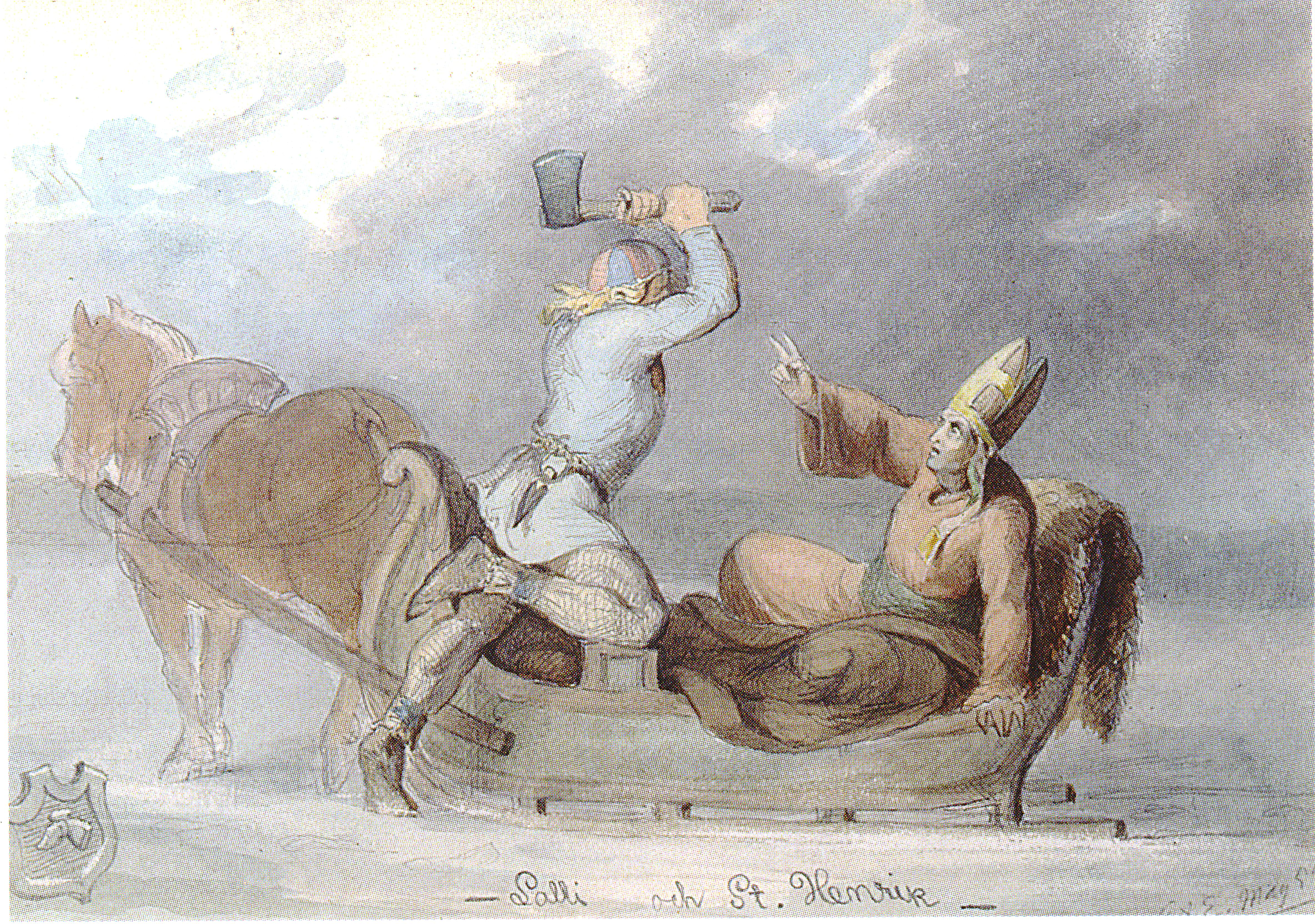
The murder of St. Henry by Lalli, painting by Karl Anders Ekman (1854)

- January 20 – Freeholder Lalli slays the English missionary-bishop Henry with an axe, on the ice of Lake Köyliönjärvi in Finland (according to legend).
- February – Domenico Morosini, doge of Venice (House of Morosini), dies after an 8-year reign. He is succeeded by Vitale II Michiel as ruler of Venice.
- May 28 – King William I (the Bad) lands with a Sicilian expeditionary force in Apulia. He defeats the Byzantine army at Brindisi and recaptures Bari.
- June 9 – Emperor Frederick I (Barbarossa) marries Beatrice I, daughter of Reginald III, adding the County of Burgundy to the Holy Roman Empire.
- June 18 – Pope Adrian IV comes to terms, and signs the Treaty of Benevento. He recognises the suzerainty of William I as ruler of Sicily and Italy.
- September 17 – Frederick I makes the Margraviate of Austria a duchy and gives the Babenberg Dynasty special privileges (the Privilegium Minus).
- Yuri Dolgorukiy, Grand Prince of Kiev, founds and fortifies the town of Moscow and erects a wooden Kremlin within the settlement (approximate date).
- December 25 – King Sverker I (the Elder) is murdered on his way to church. He is succeeded by his rival, Eric IX (the Holy), as ruler of Sweden.

==== Africa ====
- Sfax, ruled by Umar al-Faryani who was a vassal of the Normans, rebells. The locals massacred the christian population and declared independence. William I of Sicily's response was killing Umar's father, Abu al-Hasan, a hostage.

==== Asia ====
- July 28 – The Hōgen rebellion, a dispute between Emperor Go-Shirakawa and his half-brother retired-Emperor Sutoku, erupts in Japan.

=== By topic ===
==== Art and Science ====
- Mosan artists create the Stavelot Triptych, a masterpiece of Goldsmithing, as a reliquary to house purported pieces of the True Cross.

== Births ==
- January 6 – Matilda of England, daughter of Henry II (d. 1189)
- October 27 – Raymond VI, French nobleman (d. 1222)
- Abu Said al-Baji, Almohad Sufi scholar (d. 1231)
- Gaucelm Faidit, French troubadour (d. 1209)
- Hōjō Masako, Japanese noblewoman (d. 1225)
- Isaac II Angelos, Byzantine emperor (d. 1204)
- Magnus V Erlingsson, king of Norway (d. 1184)
- Robert of Auxerre, French chronicler (d. 1212)
- Sayf al-Din al-Amidi, Ayyubid jurist (d. 1233)
- Zhang Congzheng, Chinese physician (d. 1228)

== Deaths ==
- January 17 – André de Montbard, French nobleman
- January 20 – Henry, English bishop and missionary
- January 31 – Herman van Horne, bishop of Utrecht
- July 20 – Toba, Japanese emperor (b. 1103)
- August 4 – Otto IV, German nobleman (b. 1083)
- August 12 – Blanca of Navarre, queen of Castile
- November 20 – Henry I, German nobleman (b. 1115)
- December 25
  - Peter the Venerable, French monk and abbot
  - Sverker I (the Elder), king of Sweden
- Atsiz, Persian ruler of the Khwarazmian Empire
- Domenico Morosini, doge of Venice (House of Morosini)
- Fujiwara no Sadanobu, Japanese calligrapher (b. 1088)
- Fujiwara no Taishi, Japanese empress (b. 1095)
- Fujiwara no Yorinaga, Japanese statesman (b. 1120)
- Gilbert de Gant, English nobleman (b. 1126)
- Li Qingzhao, Chinese female poet (b. 1084)
- Mas'ud I, Seljuk ruler of the Sultanate of Rum
- Minamoto no Tameyoshi, Japanese general (b. 1096)
- Tairrdelbach Ua Conchobair, Irish king (b. 1088)
