= Geoffrey of Anjou =

Geoffrey of Anjou may refer to:

- Geoffrey I, Count of Anjou (died 987), reigned 958–987, called Greymantle, succeeded his father Fulk II
- Geoffrey II, Count of Anjou, reigned 1040–1060, succeeded his father Fulk III
- Geoffrey III, Count of Anjou, reigned 1060–1068, called the Bearded, succeeded his uncle Geoffrey II
- Geoffrey IV, Count of Anjou (died 1106), reigned 1098–1106 with his father Fulk IV, assassinated
- Geoffrey V, Count of Anjou (1113–1151), reigned 1129–1151, called the Handsome and Plantagenet, later Duke of Normandy, father of Henry II of England
