= 1095 =

1095 in various calendars
- Gregorian calendar: 1095; MXCV
- Ab urbe condita: 1848
- Armenian calendar: 544; ԹՎ ՇԽԴ
- Assyrian calendar: 5845
- Balinese saka calendar: 1016–1017
- Bengali calendar: 501–502
- Berber calendar: 2045
- English Regnal year: 8 Will. 2 – 9 Will. 2
- Buddhist calendar: 1639
- Burmese calendar: 457
- Byzantine calendar: 6603–6604
- Chinese calendar: 甲戌年 (Wood Dog); 3792 or 3585 — to — 乙亥年 (Wood Pig); 3793 or 3586
- Coptic calendar: 811–812
- Discordian calendar: 2261
- Ethiopian calendar: 1087–1088
- Hebrew calendar: 4855–4856
- Hindu calendars
- Vikram Samvat: 1151–1152
- Shaka Samvat: 1016–1017
- Kali Yuga: 4195–4196
- Holocene calendar: 11095
- Igbo calendar: 95–96
- Iranian calendar: 473–474
- Islamic calendar: 487–488
- Japanese calendar: Kahō 2 (嘉保２年)
- Javanese calendar: 999–1000
- Julian calendar: 1095; MXCV
- Korean calendar: 3428
- Minguo calendar: 817 before ROC 民前817年
- Nanakshahi calendar: −373
- Seleucid era: 1406/1407 AG
- Thai solar calendar: 1637–1638
- Tibetan calendar: ཤིང་ཕོ་ཁྱི་ལོ་ (male Wood-Dog); 1221 or 840 or 68 — to — ཤིང་མོ་ཕག་ལོ་ (female Wood-Boar); 1222 or 841 or 69

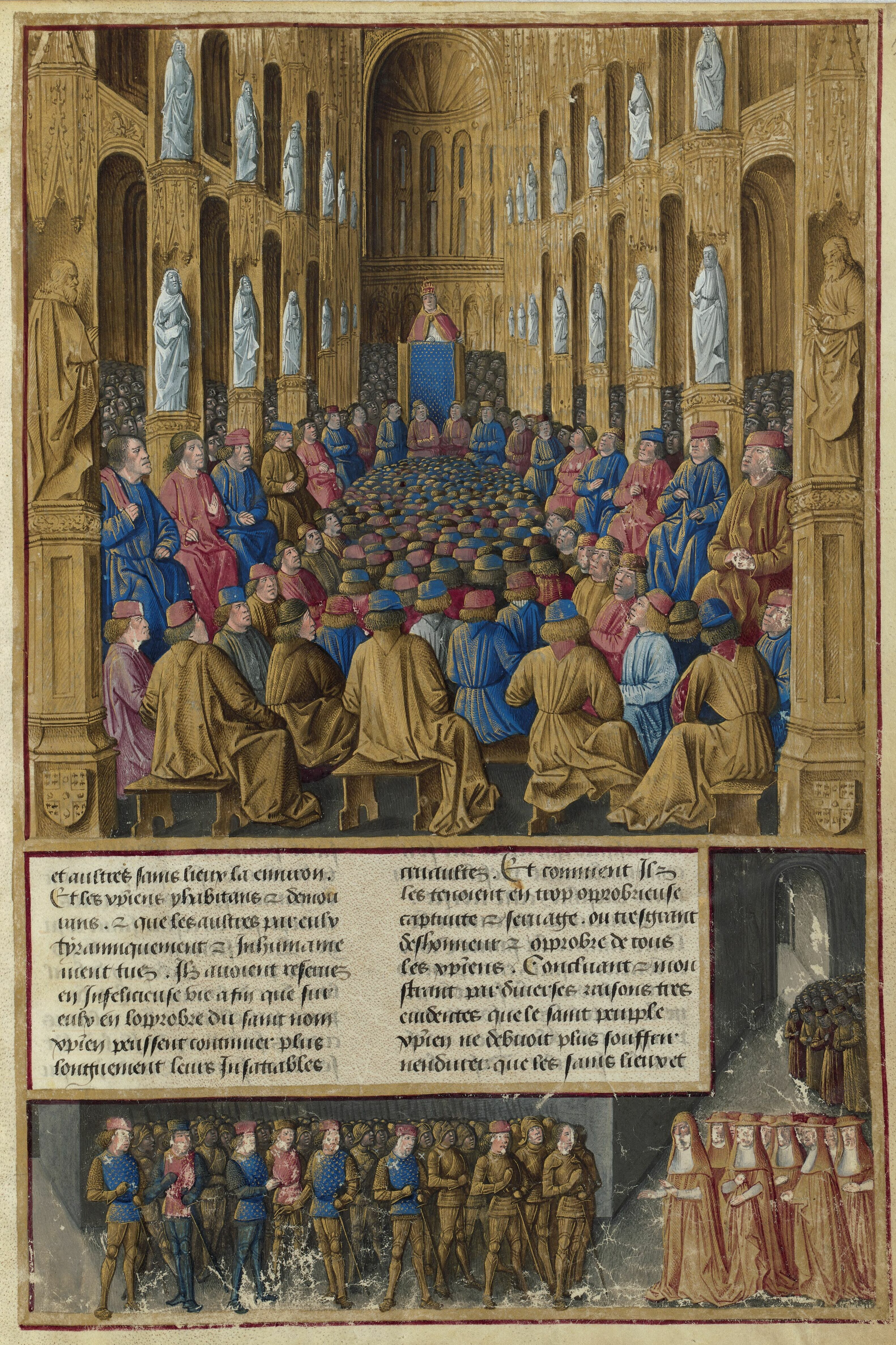
Pope Urban II at the Council of Clermont.

Year 1095 (MXCV) was a common year starting on Monday of the Julian calendar.

== Events ==
=== By place ===
==== Byzantine Empire ====
- March – Emperor Alexios I Komnenos sends envoys to Pope Urban II at the Council of Piacenza and appeals to the Christian states of Western Europe for military aid against the Seljuk Turks. Urban responds favourably, hoping to heal the Great Schism of 40 years earlier, and to reunite the Catholic Church under papal primacy by helping the Eastern churches.
- Summer – The nomadic Cumans cross the River Danube and invade Thrace, to support the pretender Constantine Diogenes (son of the late Emperor Romanos IV). The Cumans occupy the province of Paristrion (located in the Lower Danube). Emperor Alexios I places Byzantine detachments to guard the passes over the Balkan Mountains, but they are bypassed.

==== Europe ====
- The Second County of Portugal is established by Count Henry of Burgundy. The Almoravids start pushing back the forces of King Alfonso VI ("the Brave") to the positions they occupied a decade earlier. This offensive begins with the re-conquest of Lisbon, which had been given away to Castile in 1091.
- July – Coloman ("the Learned") begins to establish himself as ruler of Hungary, following the death of his uncle, King Ladislaus I (until 1116).
- August 18 – Olaf I of Denmark ("Hunger") dies after a 9-year reign. He is succeeded by his brother Eric I ("the Good") as king of Denmark.

==== England ====
- January – After attacking four Norwegian merchant ships lying in the River Tyne, Robert de Mowbray, earl of Northumberland, is called for by King William II of England to explain his actions. Instead, Mowbray rises up in rebellion against William along with other Norman nobles. William leads an army and besieges Bamburgh Castle; de Mowbray is captured after fleeing the stronghold.

=== Fatimid Empire ===
- The rebellion of Nizar is squashed by al-Afdal. Nizar is immured and his death results in a schism of Ismaili Shia. While Shiites in Egypt, Yemen and parts of Syria remain loyal to the new caliph, Al-Musta'li, the Persian and many other Eastern Shiites under Hasan-i Sabbah break away in the newly formed Nizari Ismaili state.

=== By topic ===
==== Religion ====
- November 18 – The Council of Clermont begins. The synod is called by Pope Urban II to discuss sending the First Crusade to the Holy Land.
- November 27 – Urban II preaches the First Crusade at the Council of Clermont; Peter the Hermit begins to preach throughout France.
- November 28 – Urban II appoints Bishop Adhemar of Le Puy and Count Raymond IV of Toulouse ("Saint-Gilles"), to lead the First Crusade.
- The Ismaili Shia split into the Musta'li and Nizari branch.
- Valence Cathedral is consecrated in Valence (approximate date).

== Births ==
- July 4 – Usama ibn Munqidh, Arabian diplomat and poet (d. 1188)
- December 22 – Roger II, king of Sicily (d. 1154)
- Amadeus III, count of Savoy and Maurienne (d. 1148)
- Fujiwara no Taishi, Japanese empress (d. 1156)
- Geoffrey of Monmouth, English historian (d. 1155)
- Hériman of Tournai, French chronicler (d. 1147)
- Hugh Bigod, 1st Earl of Norfolk, English nobleman and advisor (d. 1177)
- Hugh Candidus, English monk and historian (d. 1160)
- Kōgyō-Daishi, Japanese Buddhist priest (d. 1143)
- Robert Fitzharding, English nobleman (d. 1170)
- Ulvhild Håkansdotter, twice Swedish queen consort and once Danish queen consort (d. 1148)
- Victor IV (Octavian), antipope of Rome (d. 1164)
- William II, duke of Apulia and Calabria (d. 1127)
- William of Malmesbury, English historian (d. 1143)
- Zishou Miaozong, Chinese Zen master (d. 1170)

== Deaths ==
- January 20 – Wulfstan, bishop of Worcester
- March 5 – Judith of Flanders, duchess of Bavaria
- June 18 – Sophia of Hungary, duchess of Saxony
- June 26 – Robert the Lotharingian, bishop of Hereford
- July 29 – Ladislaus I, king of Hungary
- August 18 – Olaf I ("Hunger"), king of Denmark
- October 12 – Leopold II, margrave of Austria (b. 1050)
- November 22 – Donngus Ua hAingliu, Irish bishop
- Agapetus of Pechersk, Kievan monk and doctor
- Al-Humaydī, Andalusian scholar and writer (b. 1029)
- Ali ibn Faramurz, Kakuyid emir of Yazd and Abarkuh
- Al-Mu'tamid ibn Abbad, Abbadid emir of Seville (b. 1040)
- Gerald of Sauve-Majeure, French Benedictine abbot
- Godred Crovan, Norse-Gaelic king of Dublin
- Henry of Laach, German count palatine of the Rhine
- Nizar ibn al-Mustansir, Fatimid prince (b. September 26 1045)
- Robert, 2nd Earl of Cornwall (approximate date)
- Ruben I (or Rupen), prince of Armenia (b. 1025)
- Shen Kuo, Chinese polymath scientist and engineer (b. 1031)
- Tutush I, Seljuk emir of Damascus and Aleppo
- Vitale Faliero (or Falier de' Doni), doge of Venice
- William I, count of Cerdanya and Berga
