= Halldóra Eyjólfsdóttir =

12th-century Icelandic abbess

- Died: 1210
- Occupation: Abbess
- Title: Abbess of Kikjubæjarklaustur
- Term: 1189–1210
- Relatives: Sokki Eyjólfsson (brother)

Halldóra Eyjólfsdóttir (died 1210; Old Norse: [ˈhɑlːˌdoːrɑ ˈœyjˌoːlvsˌdoːtːez̠]; Modern Icelandic: [ˈhalˌtouːra ˈeiːjˌoul(f)sˌtouhtɪr̥]) became the first abbess of Kirkjubæjar Abbey in 1189, three years after it was founded by Bishop Þorlákur Þórhallsson, making her the first abbess in Iceland. After her death in 1210, she was not immediately succeeded by another abbess; no other abbess is known to have held the position until Agatha Helgadóttir in 1293.

Her family and origin is unknown, except for a brother (Sokki Eyjólfsson), who died in 1211.

== Career ==
In 1195, Halldóra was the abbess at the Alþingi and during which, she offered Guðmundur Arason, later the bishop of Hólar, the opportunity to come and direct the convent, which he agreed to do. In the autumn, Halldóra sent men north to Svarfaðardalur valley to fetch Guðmundur and his baggage, and he had gotten permission both from the bishop of Hólar, Brandur Sæmundsson, to move from his diocese as well as from the bishop of Skálholt, Páll Jónsson, to move into his diocese. When the residents of Svarfaðadalur learned that they were going to lose Guðmundur, they held a meeting and went to Bishop Brandur and asked him to revoke permission for Guðmundur's departure. They also asked Guðmundur to stay in Svarfaðardalur, which he did.

Halldóra died in 1210. It is not known who ran the abbey in the 83 years after her death until Agatha Helgadóttir was inducted as abbess in 1293. However, there were definitely nuns in the abbey regardless of whether there was an abbess there. No existing sources attest to an abbess or even a prioress there during this period. However, a well-known father-and-son pair, Digur-Helgi Þorsteinsson (died 1235) and his son Ögmundur Helgason, who managed the convent during that time.
