= Hövel (Sundern) =

Coordinates: 51°22′N 7°55′E

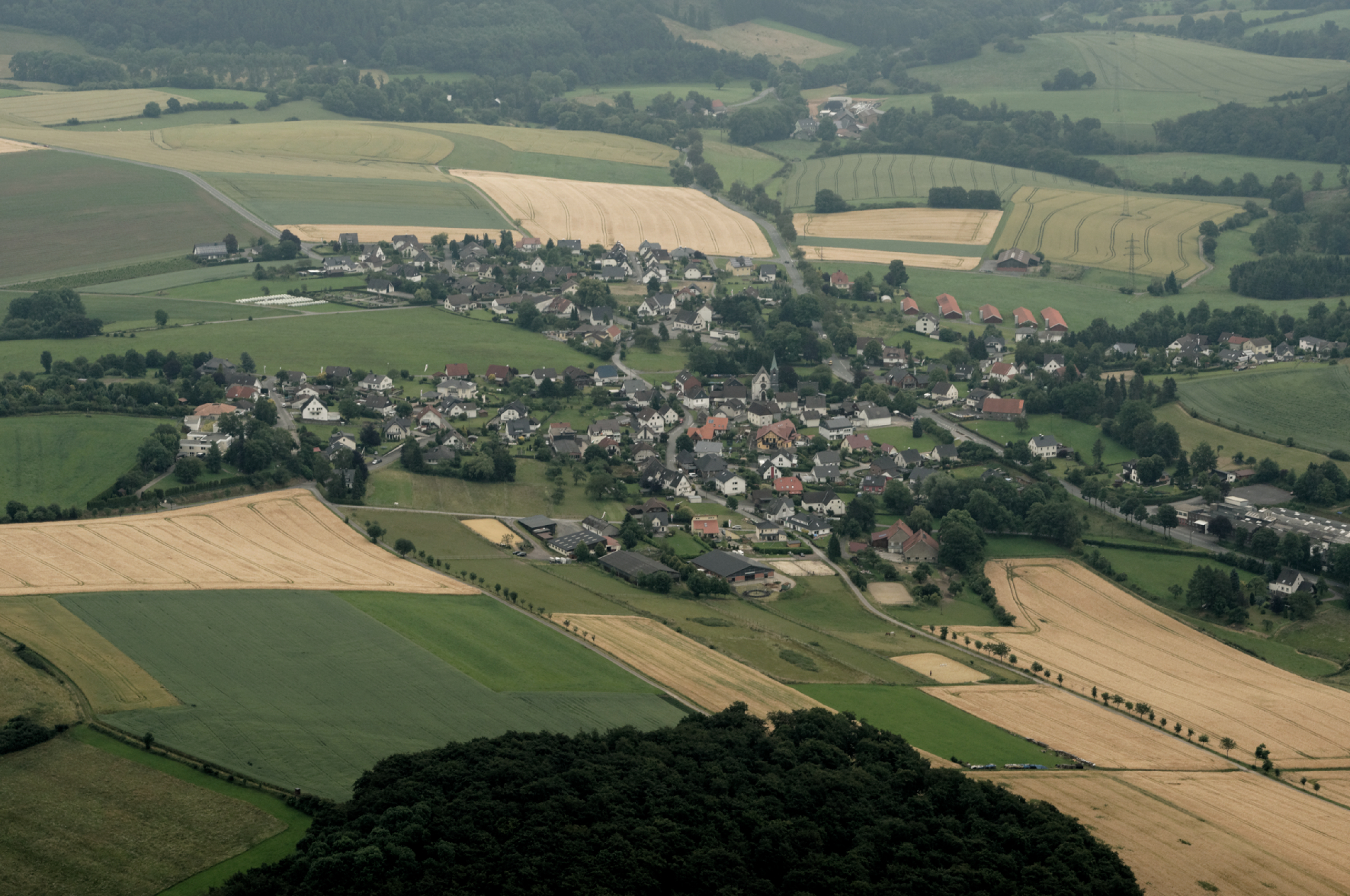
Hövel

Hövel is a village and a former municipality in North Rhine-Westphalia, Germany. It is a part (Ortschaft) of the town of Sundern.
