= Parading on donkey =

Traditional psychological punishment

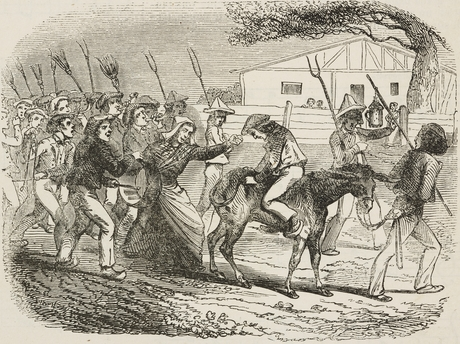
A print of a man being paraded on a donkey as punishment for being battered by his wife.

Parading on a donkey is a traditional psychological punishment, consisting in a public humiliation.

== Scope ==
- In rural areas of the Indian subcontinent, it is intended to humiliate those guilty of minor crimes, and usually meted out by village elders or the local khap panchayat system of justice. The guilty person's head is often shaved and face is painted in black and a garland of used footwear hung around their neck before they are paraded around the village or town on a donkey while mocked by onlookers. 10th century inscriptions from Uttaramerur indicate that parading on donkey was a punishment for offences such as incest, adultery, theft and forgery. The Supreme Court of India has declared khap panchayats and their punishments as illegal.
- In a legend Empress Beatrice of Holy Roman Empire was forced to ride a donkey backwards through the city of Milan after being taken captive by Milanese.
- In the Islamic Republic of Iran, "Iranian authorities frequently parade youths, forced to sit backwards on donkeys, in their local neighbourhood so as to embarrass and humiliate them ... for petty crimes such as alcohol consumption, disregarding nightly curfews and disrespect towards security agents", or if the court orders so through several neighbourhoods; this may be a prelude to subsequent flogging and/or jail terms; in the Western Ancien Régime tradition too (long continued, even in former colonies), criminals were often transported publicly to the place of their ordeal.
- In post-Renaissance France society ridiculed and humiliated husbands thought to be battered and/or dominated by their wives. A battered husband was trotted around town riding a donkey backwards while holding its tail.
- According to the Christian Gospels, Jesus of Nazareth entered Jerusalem on Palm Sunday riding a donkey and being welcomed with palms by the locals, thus fulfilling a Biblical prophecy. In this case, the donkey parade was not a punishment but a messianic action in a modest variation as a symbol of meekness, alternatively deliberately designed to fulfill such a prophecy.
- The Patriarch of Moscow and all Rus' used to parade on a donkey across Red Square on Palm Sunday, with the Tsar leading the donkey on foot.
- In the movie Kingdom of Heaven the defeated Christian king Guy of Lusignan is paraded before Jerusalem on a donkey by the Muslim army commanded by Saladin.
- In the TV series Barbarians Germanicus Maximus is led by the Germans in front of jeering Roman troops. Season 2- Episode 06

== See also ==
- Donkey walk
