= Abu Muhammad Salih al-Majiri =

Maghrebi writer and Sufi saint (1155–1234)

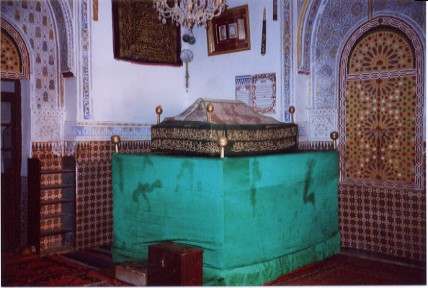
- Tomb in Safi
- Born: January 1, 1155
- Died: September 22, 1234 (aged 79)
- Occupation: Writer

Abu Muhammad Salih ibn Yansaran Said ibn Ghafiyyan ibn al-Haj Yahya al-Dukkali al-Majiri (Arabic: أبو محمد صالح) (sometimes spelled al-Magiri), simply known as Abu Muhammad Salih (1155–1234), was a Maghrebi saint and one of the successors of Abu Madyan. He was the patron saint of Safi and lived during the reign of the Almohad Caliphate.

== Biography ==
Salih was born in 1155 in the town of Asfi (Safi). His family was a Berber family that settled in Asfi in the mid-11th century. They belonged to the Banu Hayy, a sub-clan of the Banu Nasr, a clan of the Banu Magir, a Southern Masmuda Berber tribe. He studied under Abu Abdallah Mohammed Amghar in Ribat Shakir. He left Asfi in c. 1180 to study in Alexandria, where he spent twenty years. In c. 1194, he then founded a ribat in Safi (in present-day Morocco).

== Bibliography ==
- Y. Benhima: "L’évolution du peuplement et l’organisation du territoire de la région de Safi à l’époque almohade", in: Los Almohades, Problemas y Perspectivas
- Abu Muhammad Silih, Al-Manaqib wa-l-ta'rikh, Rabat, 1990
