= Kenkai =

Japanese Buddhist monk (1107–1155)

Kenkai (Japanese: 兼海; born 1107 (Kajō 2) in Kii Province – died 11 June 1155 (Kyūju 2)) was a later Heian period Bhikku of Shingon Buddhism.

Kenkai studied under Kakuban at Mount Kōya, became one of the main family of teachers and received the abhisheka from Shinyo (Japanese: 真誉).
