= Oda of Brabant =

Prioress
- Born: c. 1134; Anderlues, County of Hainaut, Holy Roman Empire
- Died: 20 April 1158 (aged 23–24); Rivreulle, County of Hainaut, Holy Roman Empire
- Venerated in: Roman Catholic Church
- Feast: 20 April

Oda of Brabant (also called Oda of Anderlues; c. 1134 – 20 April 1158) was a 12th-century Premonstratensian prioress from the County of Hainaut, in what is now Belgium. She is commonly revered as a saint.

== Life ==
Oda was born to a noble family from the Brabant region of Belgium. In order to avoid an arranged marriage to a young nobleman, she disfigured her face. Her family then allowed her to follow the religious vocation she desired. She became a Premonstratensian nun at Rivroelles, eventually becoming prioress there.

== Veneration ==
Although Oda's cultus has never been formally confirmed, popular devotion continues. Her feast day is 20 April.
