= Abu Jafar ibn Atiyya =

Abu Jafar ibn Atiyya (Arabic: أبو جعفر بن عطية; died 1158) was a writer and vizier who served four Almohad sultans. He produced a manual for writing official letters which continued to be adopted in both Al-Andalus and the Maghreb during the following centuries. Some of his own letters were preserved by historians of the Almohad Caliphate.

He should not be confused with Abd al-Haqq ibn Attiyya, the theologian from Seville.
