= 1212 =

Year

1212 in various calendars
- Gregorian calendar: 1212; MCCXII
- Ab urbe condita: 1965
- Armenian calendar: 661; ԹՎ ՈԿԱ
- Assyrian calendar: 5962
- Balinese saka calendar: 1133–1134
- Bengali calendar: 618–619
- Berber calendar: 2162
- English Regnal year: 13 Joh. 1 – 14 Joh. 1
- Buddhist calendar: 1756
- Burmese calendar: 574
- Byzantine calendar: 6720–6721
- Chinese calendar: 辛未年 (Metal Goat); 3909 or 3702 — to — 壬申年 (Water Monkey); 3910 or 3703
- Coptic calendar: 928–929
- Discordian calendar: 2378
- Ethiopian calendar: 1204–1205
- Hebrew calendar: 4972–4973
- Hindu calendars
- Vikram Samvat: 1268–1269
- Shaka Samvat: 1133–1134
- Kali Yuga: 4312–4313
- Holocene calendar: 11212
- Igbo calendar: 212–213
- Iranian calendar: 590–591
- Islamic calendar: 608–609
- Japanese calendar: Kenryaku 2 (建暦２年)
- Javanese calendar: 1120–1121
- Julian calendar: 1212; MCCXII
- Korean calendar: 3545
- Minguo calendar: 700 before ROC 民前700年
- Nanakshahi calendar: −256
- Thai solar calendar: 1754–1755
- Tibetan calendar: ལྕགས་མོ་ལུག་ལོ་ (female Iron-Sheep); 1338 or 957 or 185 — to — ཆུ་ཕོ་སྤྲེ་ལོ་ (male Water-Monkey); 1339 or 958 or 186

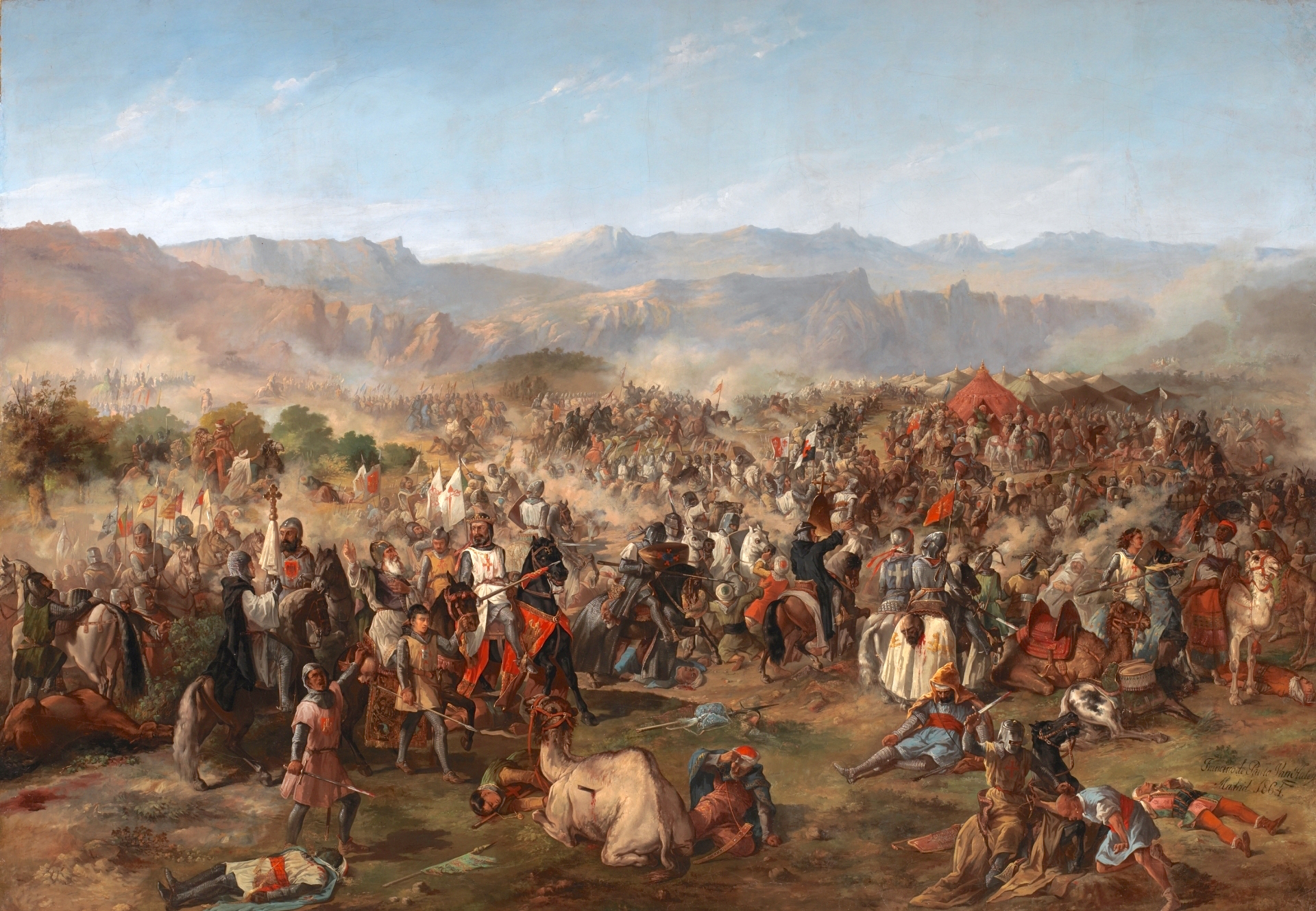
King Alfonso VIII of Castile (left) in the Battle of Las Navas de Tolosa (1864)

Year 1212 (MCCXII) was a leap year starting on Sunday of the Julian calendar.

== Events ==
=== By place ===
==== England ====
- July 10 – The Great Fire: The most severe of several early fires of London burns most of the city to the ground; over 3,000 people die, many of them by drowning in the River Thames. According to a contemporary account: "An awful fire broke out on the Southwark side of London Bridge; while it was raging, a fire broke out at the other end also and so hemmed in the numerous crowds who had assembled to help the distressed. The sufferers, to avoid the flames, threw themselves over the bridge into boats and barges; but many of these sunk, the people crowding into them.".
- John, King of England, impounds the revenue of all prelates appointed by bishops, who have deserted him at his excommunication. He remains on good terms, however, with churchmen who stood by him, including Abbot Sampson, who this year bequeaths John his jewels.

==== Europe ====
- Spring – After the fall of Argos the Crusaders complete their conquest of the Morea in southern Greece. The city, along with Nauplia, is given to Othon de la Roche, a Burgundian nobleman, as a fief, along with an income of 400 hyperpyron from Corinth. Meanwhile, the Venetians conquer Crete and evict Henry, Count of Malta ("Enrico Pescatore"), a Genoese adventurer and pirate, active in the Mediterranean.
- July 16 – Battle of Las Navas de Tolosa: The Christian forces of King Alfonso VIII of Castile ("the Noble") decisively defeat the Almohad army (some 30,000 men) led by Caliph Muhammad al-Nasir. The victory gives a further impulse to the Reconquista but this leaves the Kingdom of Castile in a difficult financial position, as numerous soldiers have to be paid by the treasury.
- The Children's Crusade is organized. There are probably two separate movements of young people, both led by shepherd boys, neither of which embark for the Holy Land – but both of which suffer considerable hardship.
  - Early Spring – Nicholas leads a group from the Rhineland and crosses the alps into Italy. In August, he arrives with some 7,000 children in Genoa. Nicholas travels to the Papal States where he meets Pope Innocent III.
  - June – The 12-year-old Stephen of Cloyes leads a group across France to Vendôme. Attracting a following of over 30,000 adults and children. After arriving in Marseille the vast majority return home to their families.
- December 9 – The 18-year-old Frederick II is crowned King of the Germans at Mainz. Frederick's authority in Germany remains tenuous, and he is recognized only in southern Germany. In the region of northern Germany, the center of Guelph power, his rival Otto IV continues to hold the imperial power despite his excommunication.
- The Teutonic Order builds Bran Castle in the Burzenland (modern Romania) as a fortified position at the entrance of a mountain pass through which traders can travel. The Teutonic Knights build another five castles, some of them made of stone. Their rapid expansion in Hungary makes the nobility and clergy, who are previously uninterested in those regions, jealous and suspicious.
- A storm surge in the north of Holland claims approximately 60,000 lives.

==== Asia ====
- Autumn – Genghis Khan invades Jin territory and besieges Datong. During the assault, he is wounded by an arrow in his knee and orders a withdrawal for rest and relaxation.

=== By topic ===
==== Literature ====
- Kamo no Chōmei, a Japanese poet and essayist, writes the Hōjōki, one of the great works of classical Japanese prose.

==== Religion ====
- The contemplative Order of Poor Clares is founded by Clare of Assisi (approximate date).
- The Papal Interdict of 1208 laid on England and Wales by Innocent III remains in force.

== Births ==
- March 22 – Go-Horikawa, emperor of Japan (d. 1234)
- May 6 – Constance, margravine of Meissen (d. 1243)
- July 9 – Muiz ud-Din Bahram, Indian ruler (d. 1242)
- Abu al-Hasan al-Shushtari, Andalusian poet (d. 1269)
- Farinata degli Uberti, Italian military leader (d. 1264)
- Ibn Sahl of Seville, Almohad poet and writer (d. 1251)
- Malatesta da Verucchio, Italian nobleman (d. 1312)
- Maria of Chernigov, Kievan Rus' princess (d. 1271)
- Yolande of Dreux, French noblewoman (d. 1248)
- Zita (or Sitha), Italian maid and saint (d. 1272)

== Deaths ==
- February 29 – Hōnen, Japanese Buddhist reformer (b. 1133)
- April 6 – Bertram of Metz (or Berthold), German bishop
- April 15 – Vsevolod III, Grand Prince of Kiev (b. 1154)
- May 24 – Dagmar of Bohemia, queen of Denmark
- July 15 – John I (or Johann), German archbishop
- July 16 – William de Brus, Scottish lord of Annandale
- August 11 – Beatrice, Holy Roman Empress (b. 1198)
- August 26 – Michael IV, patriarch of Constantinople
- September 19 – Henry fitz Ailwin, Lord Mayor of London
- October 9 – Philip I of Namur ("the Noble"), Flemish nobleman
- October 25 – John Comyn, English archbishop (b. 1150)
- November 4 – Felix of Valois, French hermit (b. 1127)
- November – Azzo VI of Este (or Azzolino), Italian nobleman (b. 1170)
- December 5 – Dirk van Are, bishop and lord of Utrecht
- December 12 – Geoffrey, Anglo-Norman archbishop of York and Chancellor of England (b. 1152)
- December 14 – Matilda de Bailleul, Flemish abbess
- date unknown
  - Abu al-Abbas al-Jarawi, Moroccan poet and writer
  - Anna Komnene Angelina, Nicene empress (b. 1176)
  - Baldwin of Béthune, French nobleman and knight
  - David Komnenos, emperor of Trebizond (b. 1184)
  - Ghiyath al-Din Mahmud, ruler of the Ghurid Empire
  - Guillem de Cabestany, Spanish troubadour (b. 1162)
  - Henry de Longchamp, English administrator (b. 1150)
  - Maria of Montferrat, queen of Jerusalem (b. 1192)
  - Peter de Preaux, Norman nobleman and knight
  - Robert of Auxerre, French chronicler and writer
  - Robert of Shrewsbury, English bishop
  - Walter of Montbéliard, constable of Jerusalem
