= Yvette of Huy =

Belgian saint

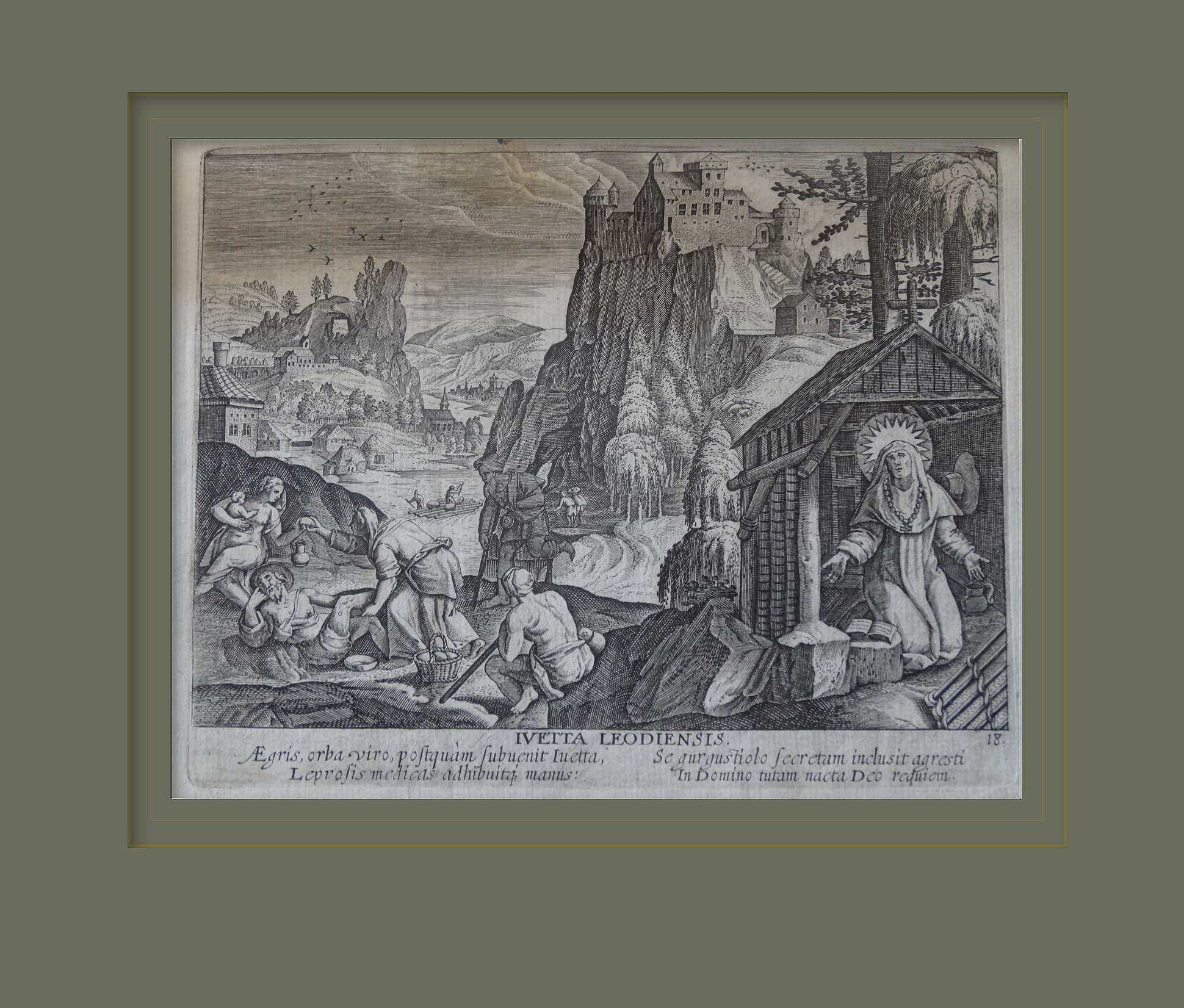
- Yvette of Huy by Thomas de Leu
- Born: 1158; Huy, Belgium
- Died: 13 January 1228; Huy, Belgium
- Venerated in: Catholic Church
- Feast: 13 January
- Patronage: brides, large families, and widows

Yvette of Huy (1158 – 13 January 1228) was a venerated Christian prophet and anchoress. Born in Huy, Belgium, she was also known as Ivette, Ivetta, Jufta or Jutta.

== Life ==
Yvette was born into a wealthy, but not particularly religious family, close to the bishop of Liège. From an early age Yvette was hesitant of marriage and wished to live a religious life. Her father was a tax collector. However, Yvette was forced into an arranged marriage at aged thirteen. Her marriage produced three children (one died while still an infant) before she was widowed at eighteen. Like many medieval women, it was in widowhood that she gained more self-determination. She began to live a more religious life by attending mass regularly, giving to the poor, and deciding not to remarry. Her father objected to the latter two activities. He was so concerned about her excessive giving to the poor that he took her sons from her, fearing that she would give away all of their wealth. Her father and others in her family also tried to get her to remarry. He even took her to the Bishop of Liège, for whom he worked, but Yvette's Hagiography attests that when the bishop saw her devotion and humility he agreed to let her stay in holy widowhood. It was after this assurance from the Bishop that Yvette retired to a virtually derelict leper hospital in Statte, close to Huy, on the heights of the river Meuse to tend to the inmates, and more fully follow her religious calling. She left her two sons in the care of their grandfather.

Ten years later, she became an anchoress and was enclosed in a chapel cell near the colony in a ceremony conducted by the abbot of Abbaye Notre-Dame d'Orval. From there she offered guidance to pilgrims who considered her a prophetess in the apostolic sense of having insight into the divine. She summoned priests and even the dean of the local church to her presence and confronted them about their behaviour. She was responsible for the conversion of her father and one of her two surviving sons. After a time, her power threatened the male clergy and canons. She was denounced. Yvette died on 13 January 1228 in Huy, Belgium.

Her life was recorded by the Premonstratensian Hugh of Floreffe. Although never formally canonised as a saint, she is classed as ‘blessed’ by the Catholic Church; feast day January 13, the date of her death. One of her sons became a monk at the monastery of Orval and became its abbot. In time he too became classed as a ‘blessed': Eustachius of Huy, commemorated on March 13 in the Cistercian calendar.

== Additional Sources ==
- "Blessed Ivetta of Huy". catholicsaints.info.
- Mulder-Bakker, Anneke B. (2005). Lives of the Anchoresses, The Rise of the Urban Recluse in Medieval Europe. Translated by Myra Heerspink Scholz. University of Pennsylvania Press. ISBN 978-0-8122-3852-5. Archived from the original on February 5, 2005.
- Mulder-Bakker, Anneke B., ed. (2007). Anchoresses of Thirteenth-century Europe – The Lives of Yvette of Huy by Hugh of Floreffe And Margaret the Lame of Magdeburg by John of Magdeburg. Brepols Publishers. ISBN 978-2-503-52077-3. OL 8911500MReprinted as Living Saints of the Thirteenth Century in 2011 with same ISBN.
- Butler, Alban; Farmer, David Hugh; Burns, Paul (1998). "Bd Jutta of Huy (1158–1228)". Butler's Lives of the Saints. Vol. January (Reprinted with revisions ed.). Continuum International Publishing Group. p. 94. ISBN 978-0-86012-250-0. LCCN 95081671.
