= Thethmar =

Saint Thethmar
- Died: 1152
- Venerated in: Catholic Church
- Feast: 17 May

Thethmar, also known as Theodemar, was a Premonstratensian canon and missionary. A contemporary and friend of St. Vicelinus, he worked to convert the Wends, a tribe in modern Germany.
