= Robert of Auxerre =

Inmate of the St Marien monastery

Robert of Auxerre (c. 1156–1212), French chronicler, was an inmate of the monastery of St Marien at Auxerre.

At the request of Milo de Trainel (1155–1202), abbot of this house, he wrote a Chronicon, or universal history, which covers the period between the creation of the world and 1211. For the years previous to 1181 this is merely a compilation from Prosper of Aquitaine, Sigebert of Gembloux and others, but it is an original authority for the period from 1181 to 1211.

It is one of the most valuable sources for the history of France during the reign of Philip Augustus, and it also contains information about other European countries, the Crusades and affairs in the East. Auguste Molinier, in fact, describes the author as one of the best historians of the Middle Ages. Robert was evidently a man of great diligence and of sound judgment. Two continuators took the work down to 1228 and it was extensively used by later chroniclers. Vincent of Beauvais made extensive use of it in his Speculum Historiale. The original manuscript of the Chronicon is now at Auxerre.

The Chronicon was first published by Nicolas Camuzat (1575–1655) at Troyes in 1608; the best edition is in Band xxvi of the Monumenta Germaniae historica Scriptores, with introduction by Oswald Holder-Egger.

Robert has been identified, but on very questionable grounds, with a certain Robert Abolant, an official of the monastery of St Marien, who died in 1214.
