= Fujiwara no Ariie =

Fujiwara no Ariie

Fujiwara no Ariie (藤原有家 1155–1216) was a waka poet and Japanese nobleman active in the Heian period and early Kamakura period. He is designated as a member of the New Thirty-Six Immortals of Poetry (新三十六歌仙, Shinsanjūrokkasen)
