= 1212 in France =

- Decades: 1190s; 1200s; 1210s; 1220s; 1230s
- See also: History of France; Timeline of French history; List of years in France

Events from the year 1212 in France

== Incumbents ==
- Monarch – Philip II

== Events ==
- January –
  - Ferdinand, Count of Flanders and Joan, Countess of Flanders are captured by Joan's first cousin prince Louis VIII of France, eldest son of King Philip II of France and Joan's aunt Isabella. Louis' aim is to acquire his dead mother's dowry, a large piece of Flemish territory including Artois, which Joan's father had taken back by force after Isabella's death.
  - Prince Louis VIII of France captures the town of Saint-Omer.
  - Prince Louis VIII of France captures the town of Aire-sur-la-Lys.
- February 25 – The Treaty of Pont-à-Vendin is signed at Pont-à-Vendin between king Philip II of France and Ferdinand, Count of Flanders and Joan, Countess of Flanders. The treaty cedes the two captured towns of Saint-Omer and Aire-sur-la-Lys to France.
- May 4 – The Treaty of Lambeth (also called Treaty of Kingston) is signed by King John of England and several French counts, including Renaud I of Dammartin and Boulogne and Ferdinand of Flanders.
- June – The Children's Crusade: The 12-year-old Stephen of Cloyes leads a group across France to Vendôme. Attracting a following of over 30,000 adults and children. On the orders of Philip II, advised by the University of Paris, the people were implored to return home. Philip himself did not appear impressed, especially since his unexpected visitors were led by a mere child, and refused to take them seriously.
- Late June – Stephen of Cloyes led his largely juvenile Crusaders from Vendôme to Marseille. They survived by begging for food, while the vast majority seem to have been disheartened by the hardship of this journey and returned to their families. Two French merchants (Hugh the Iron and William of Posqueres) offered to take them by boat to Palestine. They were then taken to Tunisia instead of Palestine, where they were sold into slavery by the merchants.

=== Date unknown ===
- Bertran de Gourdon writes two coblas on doing homage to Philip II of France
- Fontenelle Abbey, a Cistercian nunnery in Maing, Nord, France, is founded as a small oratory by two sisters Agnes and Jeanne, daughters of Hélin, seigneur d'Aulnoy.

== Births ==
=== Date unknown ===
- Yolande of Dreux, French noblewoman (d. 1248)

== Deaths ==
- October 13 or October 14 – Baldwin of Béthune, French nobleman and knight
- November 4 – Saint Felix of Valois, French hermit and a co-founder of the Trinitarian Order. (b. 1127)

=== Date unknown ===
- Robert of Auxerre, French chronicler and writer (c. 1156)
