= 1214 in France =

- Decades: 1190s; 1200s; 1210s; 1220s; 1230s
- See also: History of France; Timeline of French history; List of years in France

Events from the year 1214 in France

== Incumbents ==
- Monarch – Philip II

== Events ==
- February 15 – John, King of England lands with an invasion force at La Rochelle in Nouvelle-Aquitaine, France. He sends his half-brother William Longespée to Flanders, with money to assemble a mercenary army there. John pushes the French forces northeast from Poitou towards Paris, while Emperor Otto IV marches southwest from Flanders.
- June 19 – Roche-au-Moine is besieged by the English.
- July 2 – John of Englands forces are confronted by a French relief force while they besiege the castle of Roche-au-Moine. John retreats to La Rochelle ending the siege, but his rearguard suffers immensely by the French army.
- July 26 – Philip II arrives at the Flemish town of Tournai with his army (some 7,000 men), while the rest of his allied forces encamp 12 kilometres south at the Castle of Mortagne (France).
- July 27 – Battle of Bouvines: Philip II defeats an army of 25,000 German, English and Flemish soldiers led by Otto IV near Bouvines. The French forces take 9000 soldiers prisoner, including 131 knights and five counts with Count Ferdinand of Flanders, Count Renaud I of Boulogne and William Longespée among them.
- September 18 – Treaty of Chinon: John of England and Philip II of France agree to a truce at the Castle of Chinon, in which John of England recognises the Capetian (French) territorial gains at the expense of the Angevin Empire formally ending the Anglo-French war of 1213–14.

== Births ==
- April 25 – Louis IX ("the Saint"), king of France (d. 1270)

== Deaths ==
- February 13 – Theobald I, Count of Bar (or Thibauld), French nobleman (c. 1158)

=== Date unknown ===
- Baldwin of Toulouse, Occitan noble (b. 1165)
