= Joan, Countess of Flanders =

Countess of Flanders and Hainaut from 1205 to 1244

Joan
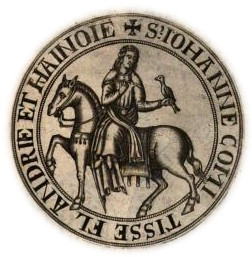

Countess of Flanders and Hainaut
- Reign: 1205–1244
- Predecessor: Baldwin IX and VI
- Successor: Margaret II and I
- Born: c. 1199
- Died: 5 December 1244 (aged 44–45); Abbey of Marquette, Marquette-lez-Lille
- Spouses: Ferdinand of Portugal (m. 1212; died 1233) Thomas of Savoy (m. 1237)
- Issue: Maria of Portugal
- House: House of Flanders
- Father: Baldwin I, Latin Emperor
- Mother: Marie of Champagne

Joan, often called Joan of Constantinople (c. 1199 – 5 December 1244), was the countess of Flanders and Hainaut from 1205 (at the age of six) until her death. She was the elder daughter of Baldwin IX, Count of Flanders and Hainaut, and Marie of Champagne.

Orphaned during the Fourth Crusade, Joan was raised in Paris under the tutelage of King Philip II of France. He arranged her marriage to Infante Ferdinand of Portugal in 1212. Ferdinand quickly turned against Philip, starting a war that ended with the defeat of Bouvines and his imprisonment. Joan then ruled her counties alone from the age of 14. She faced the rivalry of her younger sister, Margaret, as well as the revolt of her domains – guided by a man who claimed to be her father. After the end of the war, Ferdinand was released but died soon after. Joan then married Thomas of Savoy. She died in 1244 at the Abbey of Marquette near Lille, having survived her only child, a daughter by Ferdinand.

Joan's policies favored economic development in her counties; in fact, she granted several charters to the Flemish cities. She played an important role in the development of the Mendicant orders, the Beguines, the Victorines and hospital communities in her domains (without neglecting the traditional religious orders). Under her reign, women's foundations increased, transforming the place of women in both society and the church.

The Manessier's Continuation (also called the Third Continuation), one of the novels of the Story of the Grail was written for Joan, as well as the Life of St. Martha of Wauchier de Denain. The first novel in Dutch, Van den vos Reynaerde, was written by a cleric of her court.

There are several painted or sculpted representations of the Countess in France and Belgium, as well as two Géants du Nord.

== Life ==
=== Childhood ===
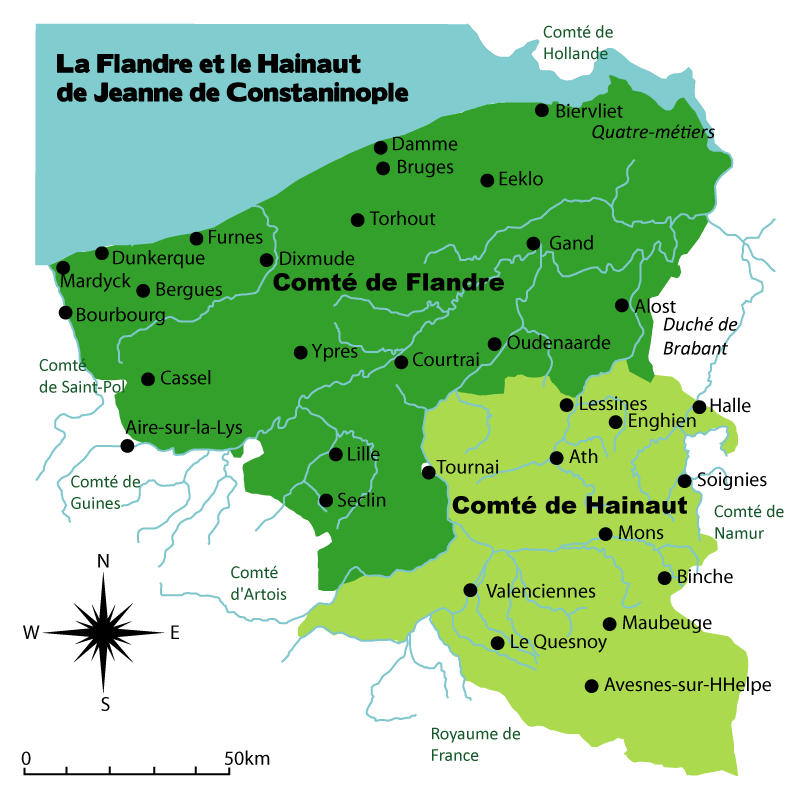
The counties of Flanders and Hainaut under Joan's rule

Joan's exact date of birth is unknown. Contemporary sources indicate that, like her younger sister Margaret, she was baptized in the Church of St. John of Valenciennes.

In 1202, Joan's father, Baldwin IX, left his lands to participate in the Fourth Crusade. After the capture of Constantinople, he was proclaimed emperor by the crusaders on 9 May 1204. Her mother, Marie of Champagne, decided to join him shortly after his departure, leaving their daughters Joan and Margaret in the care of their paternal uncle, Philip I of Namur. Marie decided to make a pilgrimage to the Holy Land before reuniting with her husband, but died after her arrival at Acre in August 1204. One year later, on 14 April 1205, Baldwin vanished during the Battle of Adrianople against Bulgarians and Cumans under Tsar Kaloyan of Bulgaria. His fate is unknown.

After the news of Baldwin's disappearance reached Flanders in February 1206, Joan succeeded her father as countess of Flanders and Hainaut. Because she was still a child, the administration of both counties was assumed by a council composed of the chancellor of Flanders, the provost of Lille and the castellans of Lille and Saint-Omer.

The guardianship and education of both Joan and her sister was supervised by their uncle Philip, who soon put his nieces in a difficult position. He became betrothed to Marie, a daughter of King Philip II of France. He gave his future father-in-law custody of Joan and Margaret, who were raised in Paris alongside the young Count Theobald IV of Champagne. During their time in France, they became familiar with the Cistercian Order, probably because of the future French queen Blanche of Castile.

In 1206, the French king demanded assurances from Philip I of Namur that he would not marry off his nieces without the former's consent. In 1208, they reached an agreement: Joan and Margaret were forbidden to marry before their legal majority without the consent of the Marquis of Namur. However, the Marquis would not oppose the royal choice of husbands. If either refused the candidate chosen by King Philip II, the agreement required the Marquis to find a husband—after compensation was made to the French king.

In 1211 Enguerrand III of Coucy offered the King the sum of 50,000 livres to marry Joan, while his brother Thomas would marry Margaret. However, the Flemish nobility was hostile to the project. Matilda of Portugal, widow of Joan's granduncle Philip I of Flanders, then offered her nephew, Ferdinand of Portugal, as Joan's husband for the same amount. The marriage was celebrated in Paris in January 1212. Ferdinand thus became Joan's co-ruler.

=== Youth ===
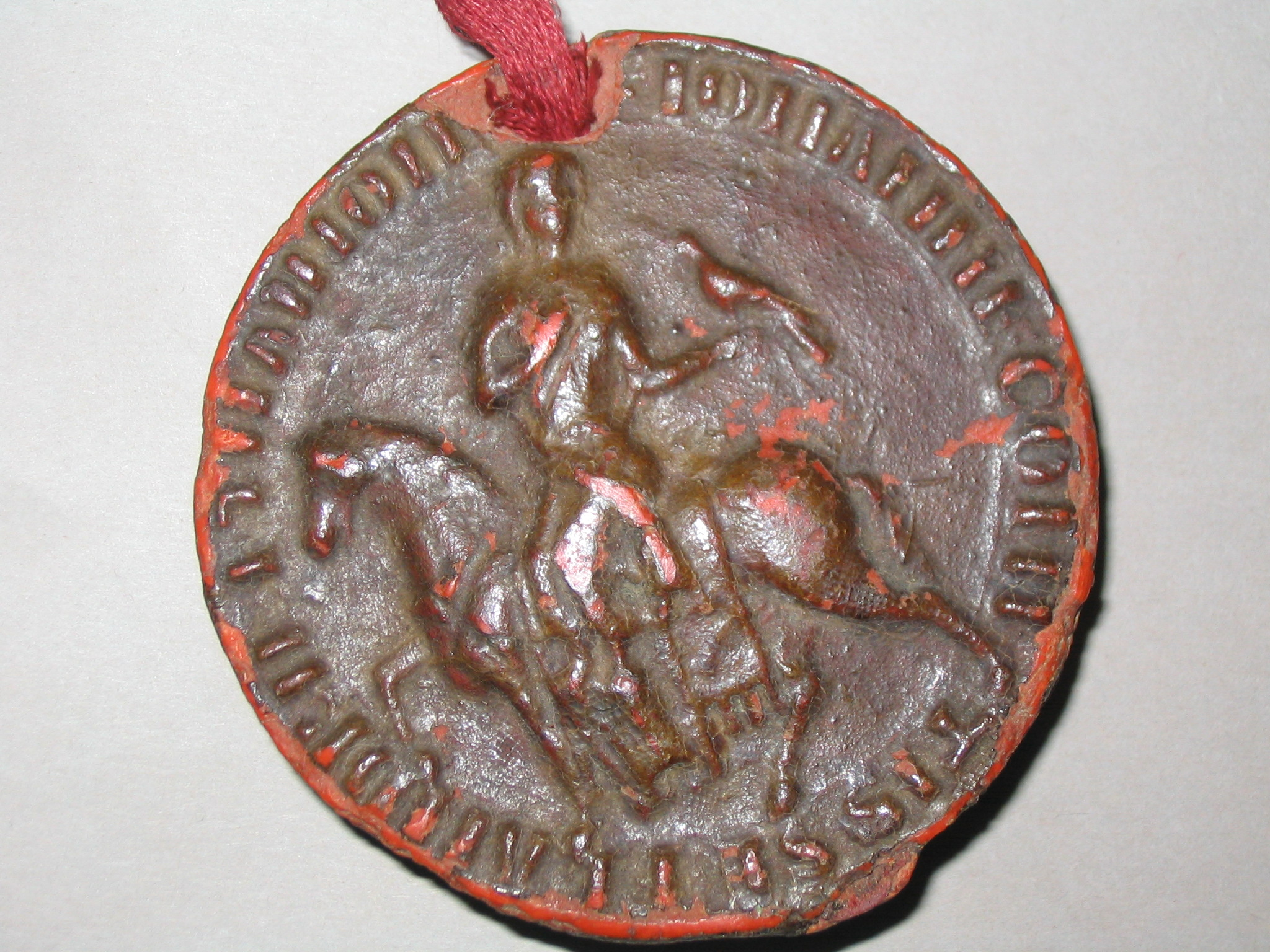
Joan's personal seal. She chose a round seal – as men had – and is represented on horseback, a hawk in hand, in an aristocratic pose.

While on their way to Flanders, the newlyweds were captured by Joan's first cousin Louis of France (the future Louis VIII), eldest son of King Philip II. The French prince intended to recover a large portion of the territory that he considered as belonging to his late mother's dowry, including the Artois that Joan's father had taken back by force after the death of Louis' mother in 1190.

Joan and Ferdinand only could obtain their release after signing the Treaty of Pont-à-Vendin (25 February 1212), under which they were forced to surrender the towns of Aire-sur-la-Lys and Saint-Omer to France, recognizing the previous occupation of Prince Louis over those lands. After this event, Joan and Ferdinand decided to join in an alliance with the former allies of Baldwin IX, King John of England and Otto IV, Holy Roman Emperor. They obtained the support of the powerful bourgeoisie of Ghent (who initially refused to recognize Ferdinand as Count) after Joan and Ferdinand agreed to the annual election of four prudhommes chosen among the aldermen of the city; the granting to the people of Ghent and Ypres of permission to fortify their cities; and the resignation of the castellans of Bruges and Ghent, deemed pro-French.

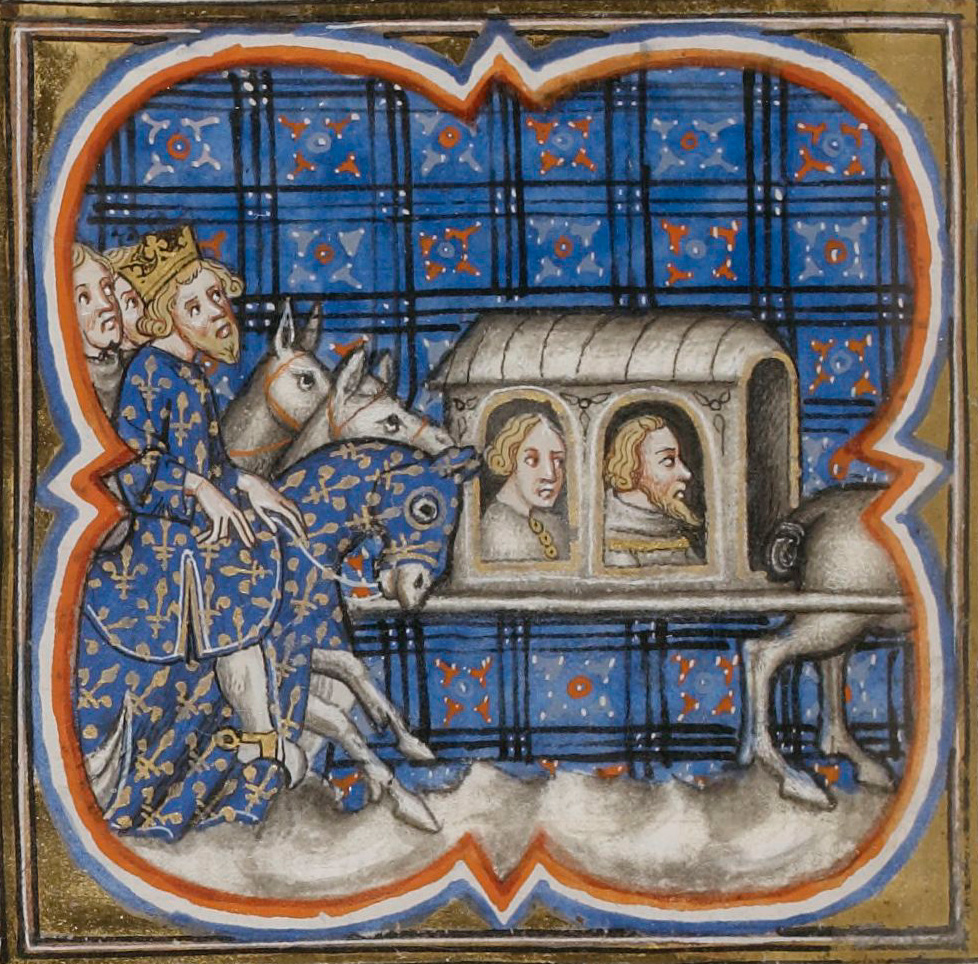
King Philip II bringing Ferdinand, Count of Flanders, and Renaud, Count of Boulogne, as prisoners at the battle of Bouvines. Grandes Chroniques de France, Bibliothèque nationale de France, Paris 14th century. MF 2813, f° 253 v°.

In retaliation for this alliance, King Philip II attacked Lille, which was burned (with the exception of the fortified castrum and churches) in 1213. In Damme, the French fleet was destroyed by the English. At the Battle of Roche-au-Moine (2 July 1214), Prince Louis defeated the English army. Then King Philip II inflicted upon his opponents a decisive defeat at the Battle of Bouvines (27 July 1214), where Ferdinand was captured. During the twelve years that followed, while Ferdinand remained a prisoner of the French, Joan governed alone.

One of her first rulings was to exempt certain groups from taxes to encourage industry: an example is that of settlers in Kortrijk, who did not have to pay property tax, to promote woollen weaving in the town. Also she ordered the reconstruction of Lille's ramparts, but fearing a new French offensive, she eventually was forced to sign the Treaty of Paris (24 October 1214), under which major fortresses in southern Flanders were destroyed; property was restored to French partisans; and Flanders was in effect ruled from Paris.

In the meanwhile, the Countess began to petition the Pope for the annulment of her marriage, arguing that it had never been consummated. In 1221, she sought to marry Peter Mauclerc (Duke-Regent of Brittany and widower of Alix of Thouars) but King Philip II refused.

=== Conflict with Margaret ===
Before 23 July 1212, Joan's younger sister Margaret married Bouchard of Avesnes, Lord of Etroen. The French King, viewing this union with suspicion, informed Pope Innocent III that Bouchard before his wedding had already taken holy orders as sub-deacon. In 1215, at the Fourth Lateran Council, the Pope annulled the marriage on this ground. Margaret and Bouchard, however, refused to submit. They took refuge at the Castle of Houffalize in the Ardennes under the protection of Waleran, Count of Luxembourg. In the following four years, they had three sons: Baldwin (who died in infancy), John and Baldwin.

In 1219, during a battle in Flanders against Joan, Bouchard was captured and imprisoned. Two years later (1221), he was released after agreeing to separation from his wife. Between 18 August and 15 November 1223, Margaret married William II of Dampierre.

The next conflict to shake Joan's rule took place in 1224, when she wanted to acquire, through her advisor Arnoul of Audernarde, the castellany of Bruges, which King Philip II had entrusted to John of Nesle, bailiff of Flanders, after the Battle of Bouvines. She challenged the excessive sums demanded by the bailiff, and the dispute was judged by two knights. Joan then appealed to the new King Louis VIII of France at a meeting in his court at Melun, contending that, due to her rank, she could only be judged by her peers. The King ultimately gave his verdict in favour of John of Nesle, which was a cause of further humiliation for the Countess.

=== Return of Baldwin ===
According to the Chroniques de Hainaut, the governor of Flanders and Hainaut Arnulf of Gavre learned from his uncle Josse Materne, who was now a Franciscan friar at Valenciennes, that Baldwin IX and his companions were able to escape from the Bulgarians after twenty years of captivity. The Chronique rimée of Philippe Mouskes reported at the same time that a mysterious stranger distributed large sums of money announcing the return of Baldwin. In 1225, a hermit living near Mortagne-du-Nord, in the forest between Valenciennes and Tournai, claimed to be Baldwin IX. He claimed the restitution by Joan of his rights to the counties of Flanders and Hainaut.

The supposed Baudouin created knights, sealed acts and behaved like a real count. Quickly, he was supported by the nobility of Hainaut, including Jean of Nesle and Robert III of Dreux. Then he received the support of the majority of the cities of Flanders and Hainaut, including Lille and Valenciennes. King Henry III of England even offered to him the renewal of an alliance against Louis VIII, counting with the support of Dukes Henry I of Brabant and Waleran III of Limburg. Joan sent her advisor Arnold of Oudenarde to meet the hermit; however, he returned convinced that he was the true Baldwin IX. Other witnesses were more skeptical, but they were accused by the people of being bribed by the Countess.

Joan was forced to take refuge in Mons, the only city that remained faithful to her. Against the promise of 20,000 livres and the pledge of the cities of Douai and Lécluse, Louis VIII agreed to take his army to restore Joan's rights.

Before launching military operations, Louis VIII sent his aunt Sybille of Hainaut, Dowager Lady of Beaujeu and sister of Baldwin IX, to meet the hermit. She developed doubts about his identity. On 30 May 1225 the King met the hermit at Péronne and interrogated him about details of Baldwin IX's life: he was unable to remember when and where he was knighted and even he did not remember his own wedding night. Philippe of Jouy (Bishop of Orléans) and Milo of Nanteuil (Bishop of Beauvais), recognized him as a juggler who already tried to pass himself off as Louis I, Count of Blois, who had also disappeared at the Battle of Adrianople.

Convinced that he was an impostor, Louis VIII gave him three days to flee. The false Baldwin IX took refuge with his supporters to Valenciennes, but the city was quickly retaken by the French. Joan required unconditional surrender. The impostor then took refuge with Engelbert II of Berg, Archbishop of Cologne, but there he lost his last followers and fled. Caught near Besançon, he was sent to Joan. Despite the promise to respect his life, he was put in a pillory between two dogs and then hanged at the gates of Lille. It is likely that Bouchard of Avesnes, the former husband of Margaret, was behind the plot: the false Baldwin IX had recognized the legitimate rights of his eldest son as heir of Flanders and Hainaut.

Following the recapture of the rebellious cities, Joan imposed heavy fines on them. This allowed her not only to pay her debts to the King of France the next year (instead of the 20 years previously agreed), but also to pay the ransom of her husband Ferdinand.

=== Release of Ferdinand ===
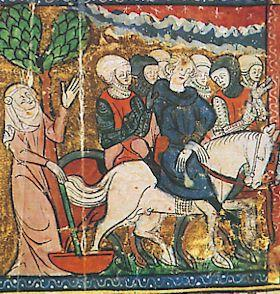
Joan with her imprisoned husband Ferdinand after the Battle of Bouvines. 14th century, Grandes Chroniques de France, Bibliothèque municipale, Castres.

Whether as a ploy or out of genuine willingness to turn the page, Joan intensified her efforts to marry Peter Mauclerc, the widowed duke and regent of Brittany. She then requested the annulment of her marriage under grounds of consanguinity from Pope Honorius III, who accepted her petition. However, King Louis VIII refused the consent to a marriage between Mauclerc and the Countess, fearing that the royal demesne, squeezed between their domains, would be too endangered. To finally end Joan's marital pretensions, the French King obtained from the Pope the renewal of her marriage with Ferdinand, while forcing her to a treaty and a ransom for her imprisoned husband.

In April 1226, the Treaty of Melun was signed between Joan and Louis VIII, under which Ferdinand's ransom was fixed at 50,000 livres parisis payable in two installments. The Treaty also stipulated that the cities of Lille, Douai and Lécluse would be surrendered to France as a pledge until full payment of this considerable amount was made. Joan was also forced to maintain her marital bond with Ferdinand. Both Joan and Ferdinand could be excommunicated if they betrayed the King, a deed which constituted perjury in feudal law. Finally, the knights and representatives of the main Flemish cities also had to swear allegiance to the King of France: at all, 27 cities and 350 nobles paid homage. After the death of Louis VIII on 8 November, his widow Blanche of Castile and his son and successor Louis IX finally released Ferdinand in January 1227 after Joan paid half of the ransom, reduced to 25,000 livres.

In late 1227 or early 1228, Joan gave birth to a daughter, Marie. A few years later, on 27 July 1233 Ferdinand died in Noyon from urinary stones, a disease that he had had since his capture at Bouvines. His heart was buried in Noyon Cathedral, while his body was interred in the Abbey of Marquette, in Flanders. After the death of her husband, Joan wanted to marry Simon de Montfort, 6th Earl of Leicester, but since he was still loyal to the English crown at this point, this did not sit well with Louis IX, who refused to give his consent. It was during that year of 1233 that Bouchard of Avesnes, jailed since his plot of the false Baldwin was released.

After Ferdinand's death, the couple's daughter and heir presumptive, Marie of Portugal, was sent to Paris to be educated there, following Louis IX's demands. In June 1235 she was betrothed to Robert, Louis IX's brother. She died shortly after, leaving Joan childless.

=== Marriage with Thomas of Savoy, death ===
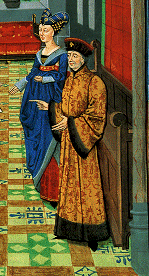
Joan and her second husband Thomas of Savoy. Miniature from the Chroniques de Hainaut of Jean Wauquelin, ca. 1448–1468. Currently at the Royal Library of Belgium.

Following Blanche of Castile's suggestion, Joan agreed to marry Thomas of Savoy, Count of Maurienne and Lord of Piedmont, maternal uncle of Margaret of Provence, wife of Louis IX. They wed on 2 April 1237, although without Papal dispensation despite consanguinity within the prohibited degrees between them (both were descendants of Humbert II, Count of Savoy). For this marriage, Joan was forced to pay 30,000 livres to the King of France and renew her oath of loyalty. With her new husband, she gave support to Louis IX against the rebellion led by Hugh X of Lusignan.

Joan died on 5 December 1244 at the Abbey of Marquette near Lille, where she had retired shortly before as a nun, and was buried next to her first husband in the mausoleum that she had previously built for him. Without surviving issue, she was succeeded by her sister Margaret, while her widower Thomas returned to Savoy. Her tomb was rediscovered in 2005 on the site of the later destroyed Abbey of Marquette; however, further excavations in 2007 revealed that the Countess' remains weren't present in this tomb.

== Political role ==
=== Economy ===
Countess Joan, in the early years of her personal reign (1214–1226), conducted a policy favorable to the development of Flemish cities. She provided legal and tax privileges to Dunkirk, Ghent, Lille, Mardyck, Seclin (1216), Biervliet and Ypres (1225). In Kortrijk, in 1217, she promoted the influx of workers for the wool industry by exempting from the taille tax to people who come to settle in this city. After the return of her husband Ferdinand, she confirmed this political orientation, by granting Douai, Ghent, Ypres, Bruges and Lederzeele new privileges, which gave them greater autonomy vis-à-vis from the Comital power. After the death of Ferdinand (1233), she maintained the Lille Charter and authorized the construction of a belfry at Valenciennes.

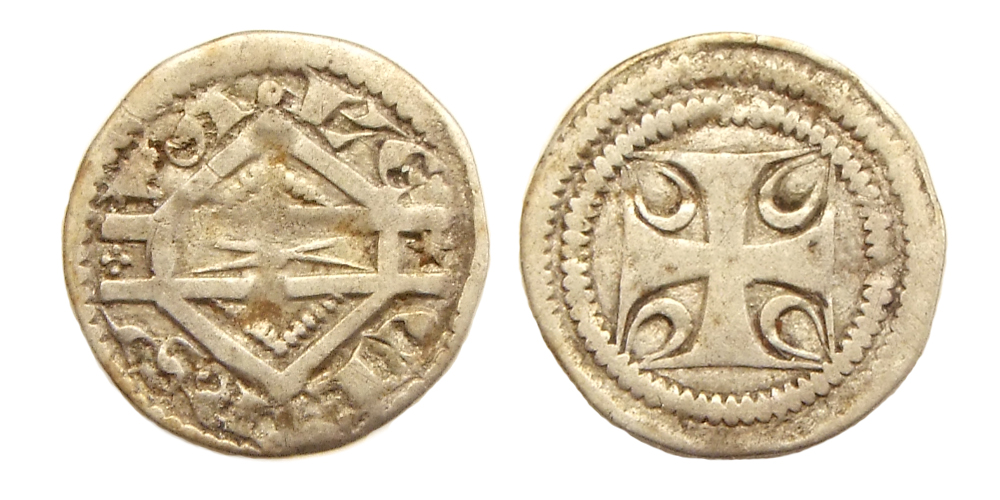
Silver denier, struck in Valenciennes under Joan of Constantinople

Then, after her marriage with Thomas of Savoy (1237–1244), she complemented this policy through tax exemptions, reorganization of the judicial system, measures to promote river commerce and sea ports, concerning the cities of Bergues, Bourbourg, Bruges, Damme, Veurne, Muiden and Kaprijke. In less urban areas, particularly in Hainaut, the comital power remained strong. Under constant pressure from the Flemish bourgeoisie, aware of Joan's need of their support against the King of France, she pursued a policy that promoted economic development and urban autonomy, not without tax counterparties.

To promote river commerce, Joan ordered in 1237 the construction of water gates at Menen and Harelbeke, making the Leie river navigable. Then in 1242, with Thomas of Savoy, she authorized the aldermen of Lille to create three locks in Marquette-lez-Lille to Wambrechies and Lille itself, extending the network to the Deûle river. The latter was ultimately not built, but replaced by a double door in Le Quesnoy.

=== Religion ===
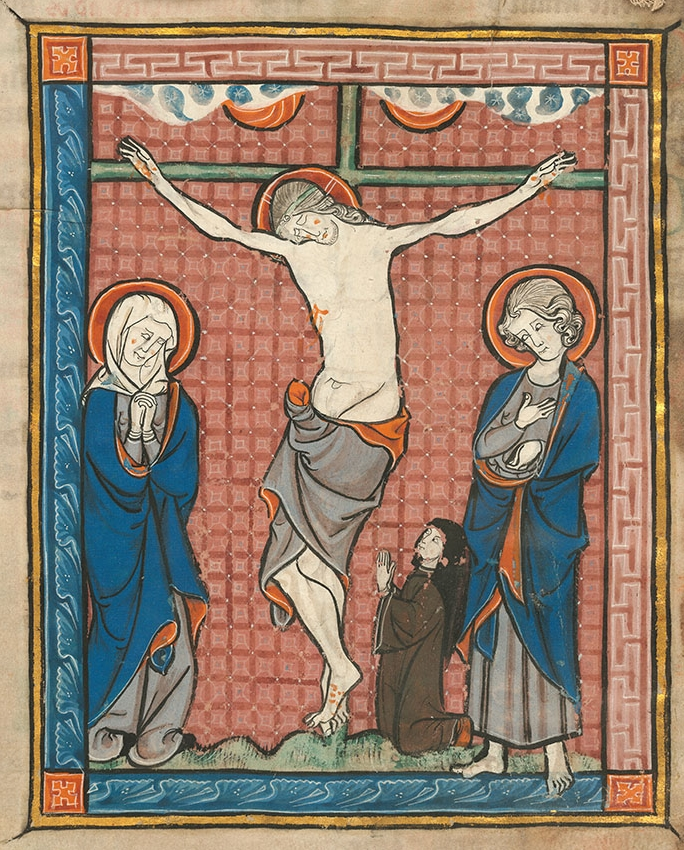
A Cistercian nun praying at the foot of the Cross. Manuscript of the 13th century that belonged to the Cistercian Abbey of Marquette-lez-Lille. Bibliothèque municipale de Cambrai, ms. 99.

On good relations with the Cistercians, Joan founded the Abbey of Marquette-lez-Lille, and confirmed, supported or helped the foundation of several other monasteries of Cistercian nuns. Until the 12th century, the abbeys of both Flanders and Hainaut were exclusively male; however, twenty female monasteries in Flanders (most notably the Abbey of La Byloke in Ghent), and five in Hainaut were founded during the 13th century. They were supported by Joan and her sister Margaret – for some of them, the role of foundresses was assigned a posteriori in modern times.

Joan also supported the foundation of the Mendicant orders in her counties. At Valenciennes, (to which a small community of Franciscans moved in 1217), she granted them the usufruct of the old Donjon of the city with for the foundation of a convent there; however, she had to face the resistance of the local Franciscan community. Finally, the two communities merged before 1241. In the case of the Franciscans of Lille, Joan sent her general contractor and carpenters to help build the church and convent.

The Countess also promoted and established several monasteries, abbeys and Béguinages in her domains: the most notable of them were located in Mons and Valenciennes (in Hainaut), Bruges, Ghent and Ypres (in Flanders), all founded between 1236 and 1244. Douai and Lille were founded in 1245 by her sister Margaret. It is possible that the influence of the Dominicans played a role in these foundations, some of which were under their spiritual direction.

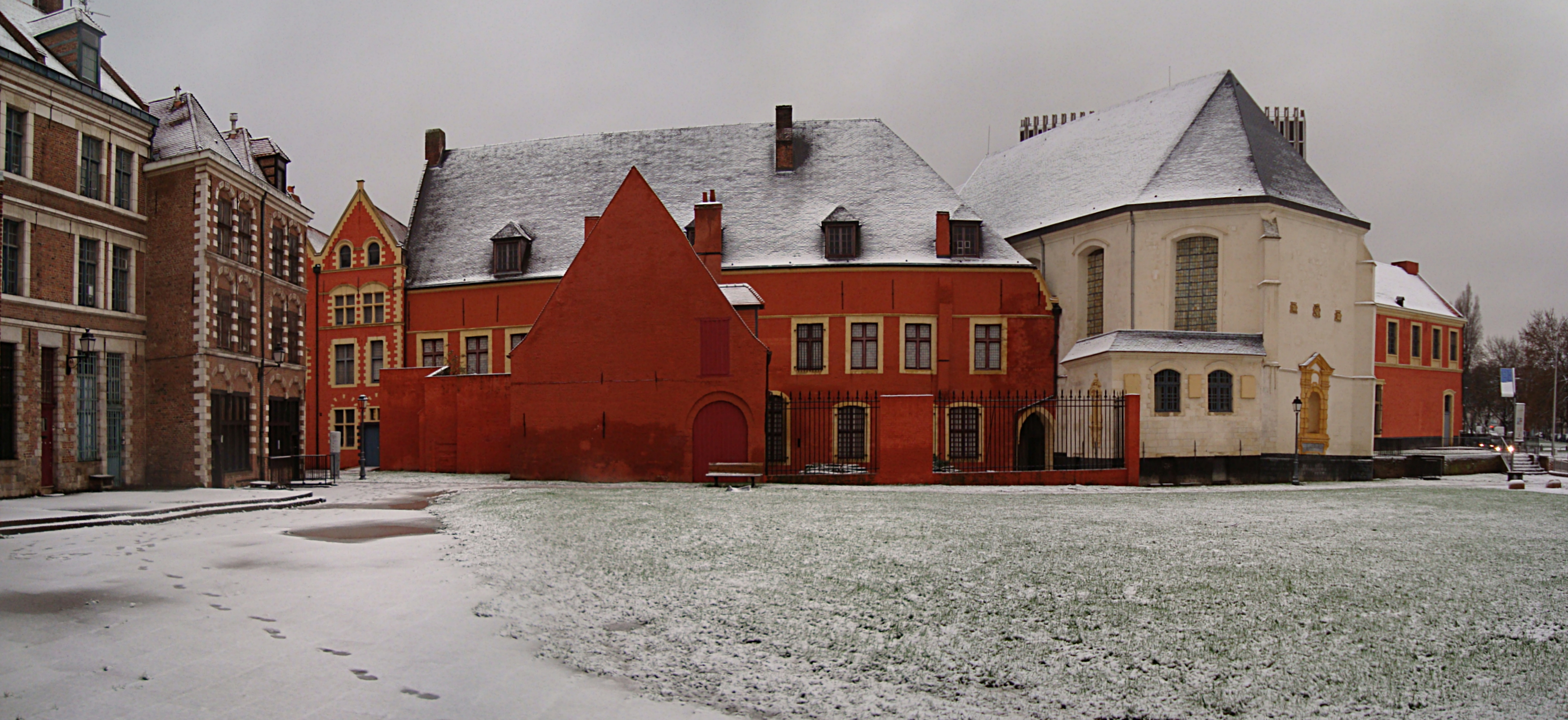
Rear view of the Hospice Comtesse on community building and the chapel. Nothing remains of the original buildings founded by Joan.

By the end of the 12th century, the religious Victorines were established in Flanders and Hainaut. A dozen monasteries were founded between 1217 and 1262. Joan encouraged this movement, and directly supported, in 1244 the creation of the Bethlehem Priory at Mesvin in the Diocese of Cambrai. These monasteries, which enjoyed considerable autonomy, had a charitable and urban land use. They responded well to the demands of the new women's spirituality of the 13th century.

Joan also supported hospitals (including Saint-Sauveur and Saint-Nicolas in Lille) and leper colonies. In 1228, with her husband Ferdinand, she provided for the founding of the Abbey of Our Lady of Biloke in Ghent. In February 1237, she founded the Hospice Comtesse, for which she donated the gardens of her residence in the castrum of Lille at the site of the old donjon which was destroyed by the French in 1213. She also founded the Hospital of Saint Elizabeth of Hungary in Valenciennes, four years after her canonization. This foundation was used by the beguines.

== Influence on medieval literature ==
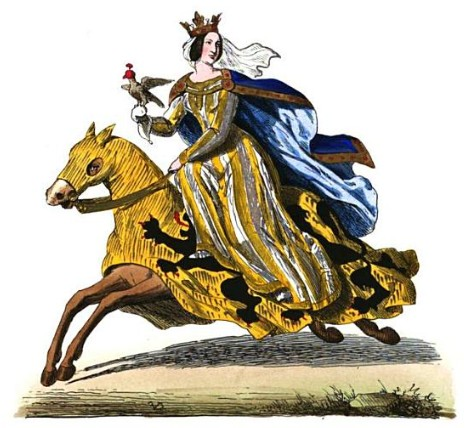
Romantic vision of Joan of Constantinople, inspired by his seal. Félix De Vigne, Album du cortège des Comtes de Flandre, 1849.

Two known manuscripts are considered to have belonged to Joan's library. The first is a Psalter preserved in the Bibliothèque nationale de France (Lat. 238), made around 1210, which could have been offered by Blanche of Navarre to her aunt when she married Ferdinand of Portugal. The second, dating from 1210 to 1220 is a copy of the Story of the Grail, kept at the British Library (Add. 36614). This second manuscript would have involved the Perceval of Chrétien de Troyes, which Joan would have added the Continuations and the Life of St. Mary of Egypt. Both come from a workshop of Champagne.

The writing of the Story of the Grail is strongly linked to the Counts of Flanders. Chrétien de Troyes wrote under the protection of Joan's grand-uncle, Philip of Alsace. Manessier, author of the Third continuation, dedicated his work to Joan. It's likely that his predecessor Wauchier de Denain, author of the Second continuation was also part of her court, without being able to demonstrate with certainty that the book was written for her. However, was widely known that he dedicated his Life of St. Martha to the young Countess, around 1212. Despite his character hagiographic, this text appears to have been designed both as a book for the instruction and edification of his teenage dedicatee, but also as a wonderful story, near the chivalric romance, including the episode of the Tarasque. Martha is presented as a great speaker, able to defeat the insurgency cities where St. Front de Passais and St. George were unsuccessful.

The Van den vos Reynaerde is the first version of Reynard the Fox in the Netherlands and one of the first literary works written in that language. It contains the original episodes, which do not belong to the Romanesque release. His author, "Willem die Madocke maecte" was identified as the lay Cistercian Guillaume de Boudelo, who died in 1261. This talented clerk was recruited by Countess, who made the request to the Cistercian General Chapter in 1238. He was appointed as director of the Hospice Comtesse in Lille, after his foundation, from 1238 to 1244 and then to the convent of Marke, near Kortrijk.

Nevertheless, Joan's activity as literary patron seems to have been limited. It is possible that to succeed in a world dominated by men, she had to voluntarily dismiss this role usually assigned to women.

== Cultural legacy ==
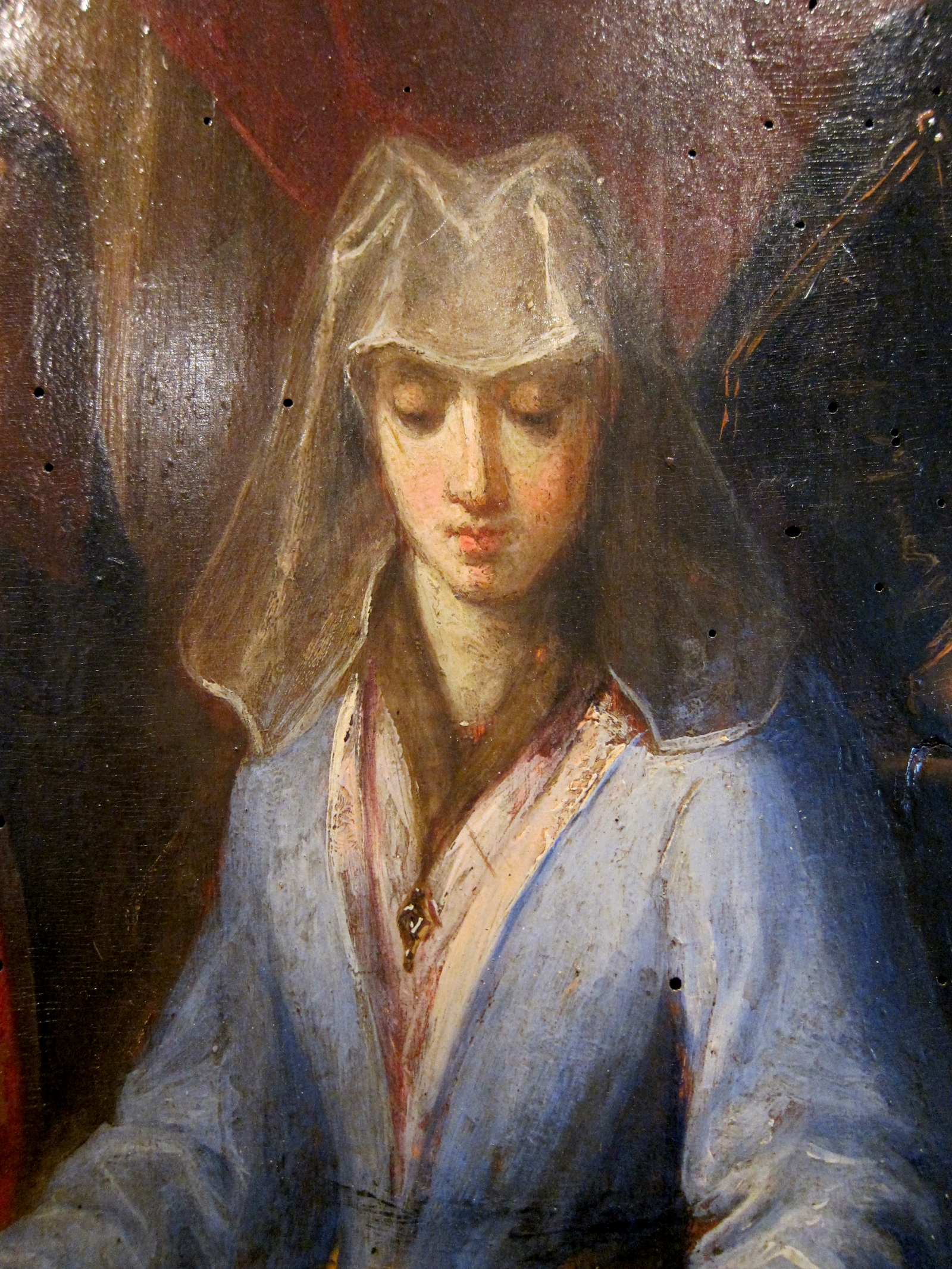
Detail of a portrait of Joan by Arnould de Vuez

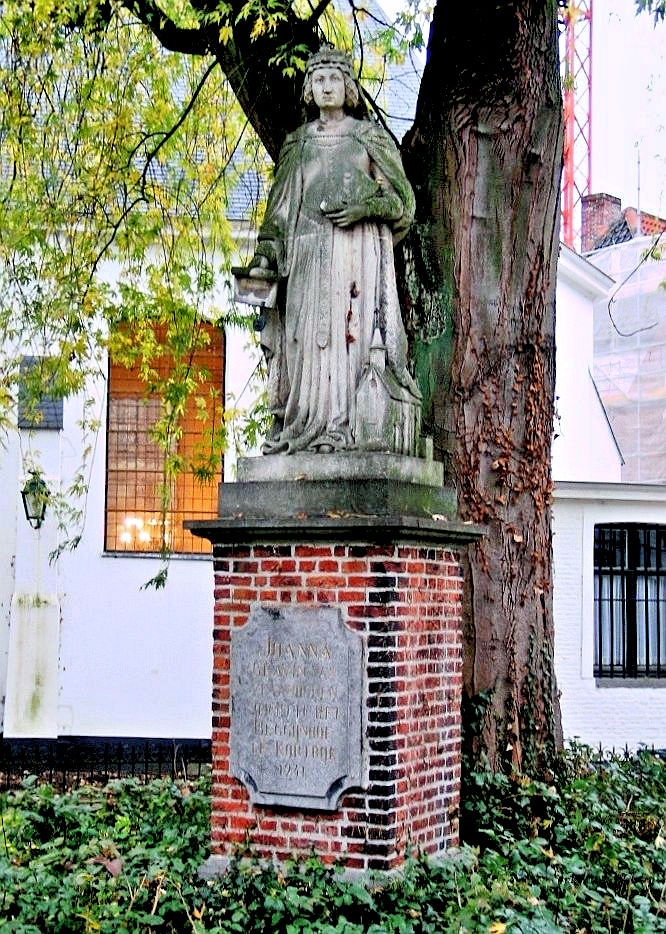
Statue of Joan of Flanders at the Begijnhof Kortrijk

Later medieval chroniclers, such as Matthew Paris, are generally hostile to her; almost all consider that the hermit was indeed the true Baldwin IX of Flanders and by killing him, she committed parricide. In the middle of the 15th century, the book Baudouin, Count of Flanders, presents Joan as the illegitimate child of the Count with a Saracen possessed by a demon, who commits patricide after a tortuous romantic plot.

In 1823 Sismondi repeats this thesis of parricide in his Histoire des Français, like the playwrights Fontan and Victor Herbin in their play Jeanne de Flandre in 1835. In response, Emile Gachet began a process to rehabilitate the Countess in the recently founded Revue du Nord. Finally, in 1840 Jules de Saint-Genois, father of the Belgian historical novel, wrote A false Baudouin, then the following year, Edward le Glay published his Histoire de Jeanne de Constantinople, comtesse de Flandre et de Hainaut, who for a long time was an authority on the subject and helped to rehabilitate the Countess.

The Museum of the Hospice Comtesse has two tapestries of Guillaume Werniers, after drawings of Arnould de Vuez representing Countess Joan. One, made of wool and silk, showed Joan sat between her two successive husbands, Ferdinand of Portugal and Thomas of Savoy, identified by their faces; it is marked "Joan of Constantinople, Countess of Flanders / founder of this house in 1233", which shows that the tapestry was made to the Hospice Comtesse. The other shows Count Baldwin IX, with his wife and two daughters, the future Countesses Joan and Margaret. In the same museum, an anonymous painting of 1632, called "Foundation of the Notre-Dame Hospital", shows Countesses Joan and Margaret, surrounded by the Virgin, St. Augustine and St. Elizabeth of Hungary, as well as monks and nuns of the Hospice Comtesse.

There are statues of Joan in the béguinage of Kortrijk and the Old Saint Elisabeth in Ghent. The mother-child hospital in the Regional University Hospital of Lille bears her name. The city of Wattrelos has created Géants du Nord for Joan and her two husbands. This is also the case of the city of Marquette-lez-Lille, where the Countess was buried.

In the autumn of 2009, an exhibition entitled Joan of Constantinople, Countess of Flanders and Hainaut, was devoted to her. It was the opportunity of an artistic creation dedicated to both Countesses Joan and Margaret by photographer Laura Henno.

== Sources ==
- Abulafia, David: The New Cambridge Medieval History: c. 1198-c. 1300, 1999.
- Fegley, R. (2002). The Golden Spurs of Kortrijk: How the Knights of France Fell to the Foot Soldiers of Flanders in 1302, 2007. McFarland and Company Inc.
- Goldstone, Nancy (2009). Four Queens: The Provençal Sisters Who Ruled Europe. Phoenix Paperbacks, London.
- Mortimer, I. (2010). Medieval Intrigue: Decoding Royal Conspiracies. Continuum International Publishing Group.
- Weiler, B, Burton, J, Schofield, P and Stöber, K (2007). Thirteenth century England: Proceedings of the Gregynog Conference, 2007. The Boydell Press.
- Wheeler, B.; Parsons, J (2002). Eleanor of Aquitaine: Lord and Lady. Palgrave Macmillan.
- Nicholas, David. (1992). Medieval Flanders. Longman Group UK Limited, London.
- Cox, Eugene L. (1974). The Eagles of Savoy. Princeton: Princeton University Press. ISBN 0691052166.
- Le Glay, Edward: Histoire de Jeanne de Constantinople, comtesse de Flandre et de Hainaut, Lille, Vanackere, 1841.
- Luykx, Theo: Johanna van Constantinopel, gravin van Vlaanderen en Henegouwen, Leuven, 1947.
- De Cant, Geneviève: Jeanne et Marguerite de Constantinople, Racine ed., Brussels, 1995.
- Dessaux, Nicolas (ed.): Jeanne de Constantinople, comtesse de Flandre et de Hainaut, Somogy, 2009. [Catalog of the exposition of Lille, September–November 2009. 22 contributions of American, Belgian, French and Swiss authoris, with knowledge on the subject] – Review by Sabine Berger in Histara, November 2010.

Joan, Countess of Flanders House of Flanders Born: 1200 Died: 5 December 1244
Regnal titles
Preceded by Baldwin IX/VI	Countess of Flanders and Hainaut; 1205–1244 with Ferdinand (1212–1233) and Thomas (1237–1244)	Succeeded by Margaret II/I
