= 1216 in France =

- Decades: 1190s; 1200s; 1210s; 1220s; 1230s
- See also: History of France; Timeline of French history; List of years in France

Events from the year 1216 in France

== Incumbents ==
- Monarch – Philip II

== Events ==
- Early May – Albigensian Crusade: French forces under Raymond VII, count of Toulouse, besiege Castle Beaucaire.
- May 21 – First Barons' War: Prince Louis of France, son of King Philip II, invades England in support of the barons, landing in Thanet. He enters London without opposition, and is proclaimed, but not crowned, King of England at Old St Paul's Cathedral.
- June –
  - Prince Louis of France captures Rochester Castle
  - Prince Louis of France captures Winchester
- July 24 – Albigensian Crusade: The occupants of Castle Beaucaire running low on supplies and surrender to French forces under Raymond VII, count of Toulouse, after being besieged for three months.
- November 12 – Prince Louis of France besieges Hertford Castle, held by Sir Walter de Godarville.
- December 6 – Prince Louis of France takes Hertford Castle. He allows the defending knights to leave with their horses and weapons.
- Late December – Prince Louis of France besieges and takes Berkhamsted Castle. He allows the defending royal garrison to withdraw honourably with their horses and weapons.

=== Date unknown ===
- Using revenue form the royal demesne, King Philip II of France is the first Capetian king to build a French navy actively. In 1215, his fleet could carry a total of 7,000 men.

== Births ==
- September 25 – Robert I, French nobleman (d. 1250)

=== Date unknown ===
- Bernard Ayglerius (or Aygler), French cardinal (d. 1282)

== Deaths ==
- January 18 – Guy II of Dampierre, French nobleman

=== Date unknown ===
- Ida of Boulogne, French noblewoman (b. 1160)
