= Treaty of Melun =

1226 treaty between France and Flanders

The Treaty of Melun was signed on 5 April 1226 between Louis VIII of France and Joan, Countess of Flanders.

Joan was forced into accepting the accord since her husband, Ferrand of Portugal, was captured by the French at Bouvines on 27 July 1214.

Based on the terms of the treaty, Ferrand and Joan were forced to swear their loyalty to Louis. Consequently, Flemish nobles, knights, and burghers had to take oaths of loyalty to the King of France, which included the understanding not to support the Count of Flanders if he were to betray the King. Also, no new castles were to be erected below the Scheldt. Lastly, Jeanne was forced to pay 50,000 livres in order to have her husband released from prison.

== Sources ==
- Nicholas, David M (2014). Medieval Flanders. Taylor & Francis.
- Spiegel, Gabrielle M. (1993). Romancing the Past: The Rise of Vernacular Prose Historiography in Thirteenth-Century France. University of California Press.
- Verbruggen, J. F. (2002). The Battle of the Golden Spurs (Courtrai, 11 July 1302): A Contribution to the History of Flanders' War of Liberation, 1297-1305. Boydell Press.
- Verbruggen, J.F. (2004). Bachrach, Bernard S.; Rogers, Clifford J.; DeVries, Kelly (eds.). "Military Service in the County of Flanders". The Journal of Medieval Military History. II. Translated by DeVries, Kelly. The Boydell Press.
