= 1215 in France =

- Decades: 1190s; 1200s; 1210s; 1220s; 1230s
- See also: History of France; Timeline of French history; List of years in France

Events from the year 1215 in France

== Incumbents ==
- Monarch – Philip II

== Events ==
- January 8 – Simon de Montfort, 5th Earl of Leicester, is elected lord of Languedoc in a council at Montpellier, after his campaign against the Cathar heretics during the Albigensian Crusade. The Crusaders capture Château de Castelnaud-la-Chapelle and enter Toulouse; the town pays an indemnity of 30,000 marks and is gifted to Montfort.
- April –
  - Louis VIII of France, fulfilling his father's vow to crusade against the Albigensians, is cautioned by a papal legate not to impede the crusade.
  - At Narbonne, Louis VIII of France ordered the destruction of the town's fortifications in response to a disagreement between Simon de Montfort and Arnaud Amalric and forced the viscount of Narbonne Aimery III of Narbonne and other authorities to swear loyalty to Simon.
- October – First Barons' War: The Barons offer the English crown to Prince Louis VIII of France and invite him to England.
- November – First Barons' War: Louis VIII of France sends the barons a contingent of knights to protect London. Louis agrees to an open invasion, despite the discouragement from his father King Philip II of France and from Pope Innocent III.

=== Date unknown ===
- Using revenue form the royal demesne, King Philip II of France is the first Capetian king to build a French navy actively. In 1215, his fleet could carry a total of 7,000 men.

== Births ==
=== Date unknown ===
- John I, French nobleman and knight (d. 1249)

== Deaths ==
=== Date unknown ===
- Bertran de Born, French nobleman, poet and troubadour (c. 1140)
- Esclarmonde of Foix, French noblewoman and Cathar
- Giraut de Bornelh (or de Borneil), French troubadour (b. 1138)
