= The Battle of Bouvines (painting) =

Painting by Horace Vernet

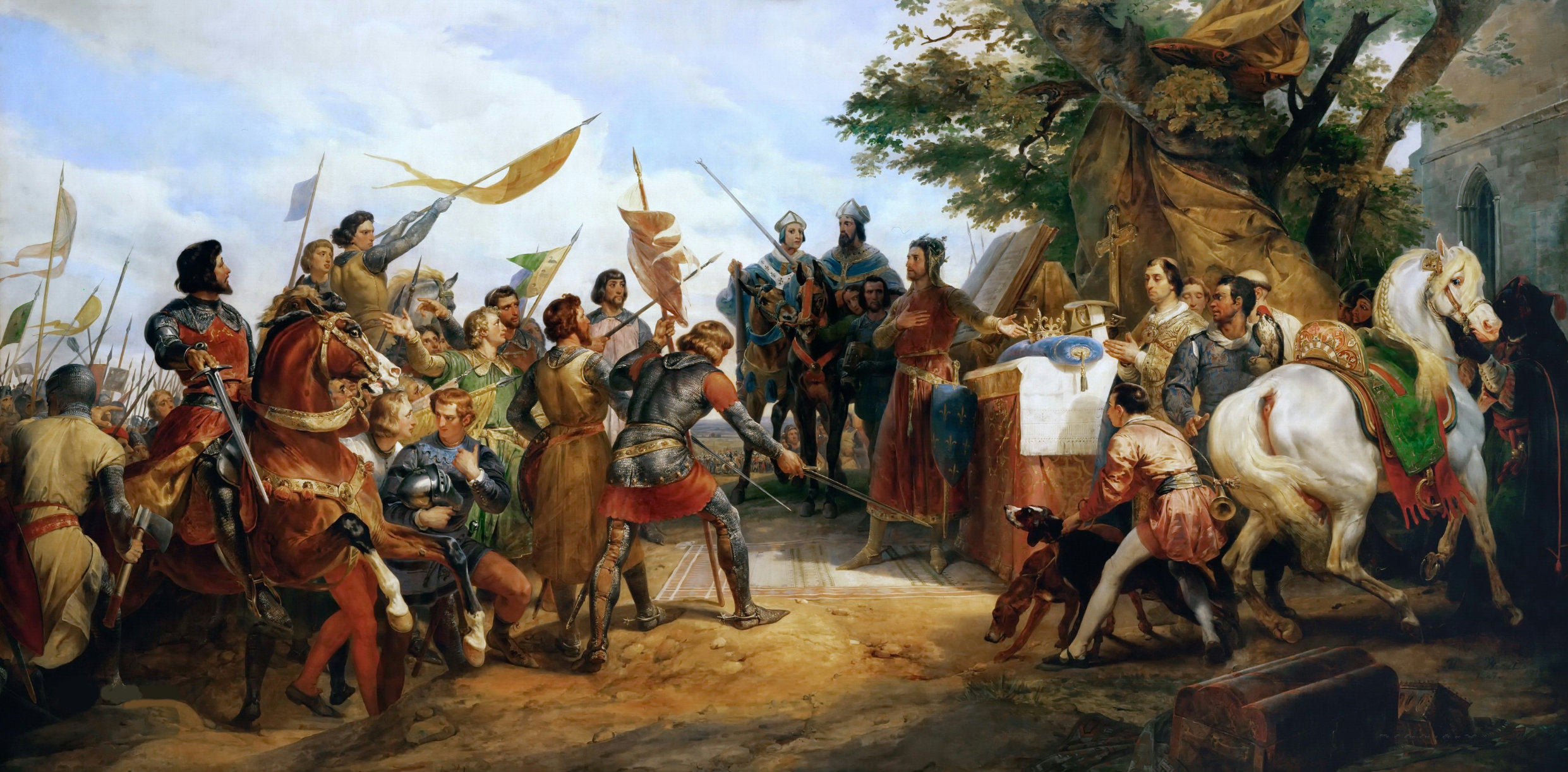
- Artist: Horace Vernet
- Year: 1827
- Medium: Oil on canvas
- Dimensions: 510 cm × 958 cm (200 in × 377 in)
- Location: Palace of Versailles, Versailles

The Battle of Bouvines (French: Bataille de Bouvines, 27 juillet 1214) is an 1827 history painting by the French artist Horace Vernet. It depicts Philip II of France shortly before the Battle of Bouvines in 1214. A victory for Philip, the subsequent Truce of Chinon ended the Anglo-French War.

It was commissioned by Charles X and was exhibited at the Salon of 1827. It was one of several history paintings he submitted that year. It was later included in the Galerie des Batailles in the Palace of Versailles.

== Bibliography ==
- Boime, Albert. A Social History of Modern Art, Volume 3: Art in Age of Counterrevolution. University of Chicago Press, 2004.
- Harkett, Daniel & Hornstein, Katie (ed.) Horace Vernet and the Thresholds of Nineteenth-Century Visual Culture. Dartmouth College Press, 2017.
- Hosler, John D. Seven Myths of Military History. Hackett Publishing, 2022.
- Ruutz-Rees, Janet Emily. Horace Vernet. Scribner and Welford, 1880.
