= 1217 in France =

- Decades: 1190s; 1200s; 1210s; 1220s; 1230s
- See also: History of France; Timeline of French history; List of years in France

Events from the year 1217 in France

== Incumbents ==
- Monarch – Philip II

== Events ==
- February – Prince Louis VIII of France returns to France from England to gather reinforcements in the First Barons' War
- May 20 – Second Battle of Lincoln: English relief forces under the command of William Marshal, 1st Earl of Pembroke defeat French troops at Lincoln Castle, during the First Barons' War. Thomas, Count of Perche, commanding the French troops, was killed and Louis VIII of France was expelled from his base in the southeast of England.
- Late May – French troops on their flight south to London after their defeat in the Second Battle of Lincoln are ambushed and some are killed by inhabitants of towns between Lincoln and London.
- August 24 – Battle of Sandwich: A Plantagenet English fleet commanded by Hubert de Burgh attacked and defeated a Capetian French fleet led by Eustace the Monk and Robert of Courtenay off Sandwich, Kent. The English captured the French flagship and most of the supply vessels, forcing the rest of the French fleet to return to Calais. When the news reached Louis, he entered into renewed peace negotiations.
- August 29 – The newly-captured French knight, Robert de Courtenay, is allowed to go to London to speak with Louis VIII about peace negotiations with England, while Robert of Dreux remains as a hostage in his stead.
- September 5 or 6 – Negotiations between Louis VIII of France and regent William Marshal, on behalf of the young King Henry III of England start at either Staines on 6 September, because the royal court was nearby at Chertsey or possibly on 5 September on an island of the Thames near Kingston.
- September 9 – A letter is brought to Louis VIII of France from William Marshal asking for a day's truce and requesting that Hugh de Malaunay might be sent to speak with Marshal and the council. Both of these requests were granted by Louis. A parley was then fixed for September 12, and a prolongation of the truce till the 14th.
- September 11 – A treaty is signed by Louis VIII's and Henry III's regents at Lambeth Palace (the archbishop of Canterbury's London house).
- September 12 and 13 – Louis VIII of France and Henry III of England, together with Henry's mother Isabella of Angoulême, Cardinal Guala and William Marshal, came to an agreement on the final Treaty of Kingston.
- September 13 – Papal ratification of the Treaty of Lambeth from the papal legate, who were encamped near Kingston.
- September 20 – A Treaty of Lambeth signed on 20 September ratifying the Kingston treaty. Louis undertook not to attack England again and agreed to renounce his claim to the English throne, in exchange for 10,000 marks.
- September 22 – Papal legate issues his terms of the ratification of the Treaty of Lambeth at Merton.
- September 28 – Prince Louis VIII of France returns to France from Dover, England

=== Date unknown ===
- The Pentemont Abbey is founded south-west of Beauvais in an orchard by Philip of Dreux, the famed crusader bishop of Beauvais, who wished to found a convent of the Cistercian order.

== Births ==
=== Date unknown ===
- Guillaume III, French nobleman and knight (d. 1288)

== Deaths ==
- May 20 – Thomas of Perche, French nobleman (b. 1195)
- August 24 – Eustace the Monk, French mercenary and pirate (c. 1170)
- September 29 – Jean de Montmirail, French monk (b. 1165)
- November 4 – Philip of Dreux, French bishop (b. 1158)

=== Date unknown ===
- Reginald of Bar (or de Mouçon), French bishop
- William I, French nobleman and knight (b. 1176)
