= Félix Dehau =

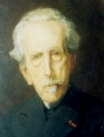
Félix-Étienne-Marie-Joseph Dehau

Félix-Étienne Dehau (1846–1934), Knight Commander of the Order of St. Gregory the Great, was a scion of a bourgeois family of Lille, France, an art collector, a patron of schools, orphanages and churches, and for 62 years, from 1872 to 1934, mayor of the commune of Bouvines.

== Family ==
Félix-Étienne Dehau was born in Lille on 22 January 1846, the son of Félix Amé Julien Dehau (1787–1870) and Stéphanie Louise Joséphine Defontaine (1813–1887). On 21 November 1868, he married Marie Claire Adélaïde Lenglart (1849–1940). Between 1870 and 1888 the couple had eight children, Pierre, Félicie, Claire, Madeleine, Marthe, Élisabeth, Henriette and Jean.

== Patronage ==
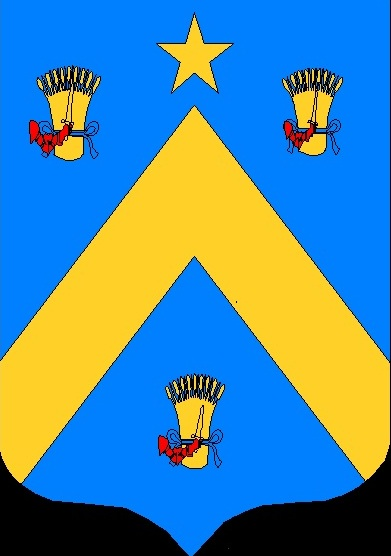
Félix-Etienne Dehau - armoiries

In 1884, Dehau founded the Ecole Pratique Libre d’Agriculture de Genech (now Institut de Genech) on property that he owned. In 1903, he purchased land in Belgium to rehouse members of a religious order made homeless by the 1901 Law of Associations. These were displaced again by the First World War, and in 1925 Chevetogne Abbey was established on the site.

Dehau organized the festivities marking the seventh centenary of the Battle of Bouvines in 1914, rebuilding the parish church and commissioning stained-glass windows depicting the battle. Sixty years before, at the age of eight, he had performed as a page in a historical pageant to mark the rebuilding of what is now Lille Cathedral.
