= Stephen Longchamp =

Stephen Longchamp was born before 1170 (died 1214) and believed to be the brother of William Longchamp. He was an Anglo-Norman knight of the 12th and 13th centuries. His brother was William Longchamp, who was justiciar of England.

He fought for Richard I, King of England in the Third Crusade. He fought at the Siege of Acre (1189–91), and was declared joint governor of Acre after it fell to the Crusaders.

Later, during the reign of John, King of England, he took the side of the French king. He was killed fighting on the French side at the Battle of Bouvines.
