= Elucidation =

Old French romance poem

The Elucidation is an anonymous Old French poem of the early 13th century, which was written to serve as a prologue to Chrétien de Troyes' Perceval, le Conte du Graal. The poem counts 484 lines and cites one Master Blihis as a source for its contents.

== Manuscript ==
It is preserved in only one manuscript, Mons 331/206 (olim 4568), and in the Prose Perceval printed in 1530. Moreover, a German translation by Philipp Colin and Claus Wisse appeared in the Nüwe Parzefal of the 14th-century. In Mons 331/206, the text is grouped together with the so-called Bliocadran prologue, Chrétien's Perceval and three Continuations of Chrétien's poem. In its received form, the text presents serious difficulties to modern scholars, containing many corrupt forms and readings such as may have been miscopied or wrongly interpreted by a scribe whose own source text may have been far from perfect.

== Synopsis ==
Although the Elucidation was conceived as a prologue to Chrétien de Troyes' unfinished romance Perceval, le Conte du Graal, it is in many ways a significant departure from it, even to the extent of offering contradictory material. Albert Wilder Thompson, who edited the poem in 1931, suggests that the poem can be broken up into five sections.

The first part (lines 1–28) is an introduction in which the reader is told that a degree of reticence about the secrets of the Grail must be kept, a note of warning which is here ascribed to one Master Blihis. It also hints at the role of "seven guards" later in the poem.

The second part (lines 29–98) recounts that the Maidens of the Well used to serve food and drink to every visitor until King Amangon raped them and took off with their golden cups. As a consequence of the crime, the land turned into a barren wasteland and the Castle of the Fisher King could not be found for a considerable time after.

The third part (99–224) forwards to the world of King Arthur and his knights, who intend to seek redress for the crime and so restore the land. The knights are unable to find the wells and the maidens, but find other maidens whom they vigorously defend in battle. The first triumph against the enemy is when Gauvain defeats the knight Blihos Bliheris. Sent to Arthur's court, Blihos reveals that the maidens descend from the Maidens of the Wells. Arthur and his knights then seek out the Fisher King and his castle.

In the fourth section (225–338 and 383–484), Gauvain and Perceval have located the castle and witness the procession of the Grail. Gauvain's success is briefly anticipated, but Perceval's Grail adventure soon takes centre stage. As in Chrétien's poem, Perceval begins his career at Arthur's court as an unseasoned youth who through his deeds and behaviour, ultimately proves himself a laudable knight. However, the poem differs from Chrétien in that the young hero does not fail to ask the crucial question "what is the purpose of the Grail?" Perceval goes on to ask about the identity of a dead body and the broken sword that lay on it, but neglects to ask the reason for the bleeding of the lance. It then appears that the procession is performed three times a day, each time before a banquet at which the food is served autonomously by the Grail, without the need of servers. Though the account is notably different, the author asserts that the service of the Grail was revealed to Chrétien by the "good master", possibly the "Master Blihis" referred to in the introduction.

In the fifth part, which occurs within the fourth section (lines 339–382), the speaker adds that the castle was discovered only seven times in the course of history and that seven "guards" will provide the individual narratives. Of these, the seventh is about the Lance of Longinus, but the allusions to the other tales cannot be so readily identified: (1) "Adventure of the Shield"; (2) "Story of the Great Sorrows", how Lancelot lost strength; (3) a story involving a goshawk which attacked Amangon's son and terrified Castrar, (4) "Story of the Swan" (about one Carahet who came to Glamorgan, possibly Guerrehet, the French form of Gareth, Gawain's brother), (5) about the "wrath and loss of Husdent"; and (6) about "the great struggle".
