= Battle of Bouvines =

Battle ending the 1202–1214 Anglo-French Wars

- Part of the Anglo-French War of 1213–1214
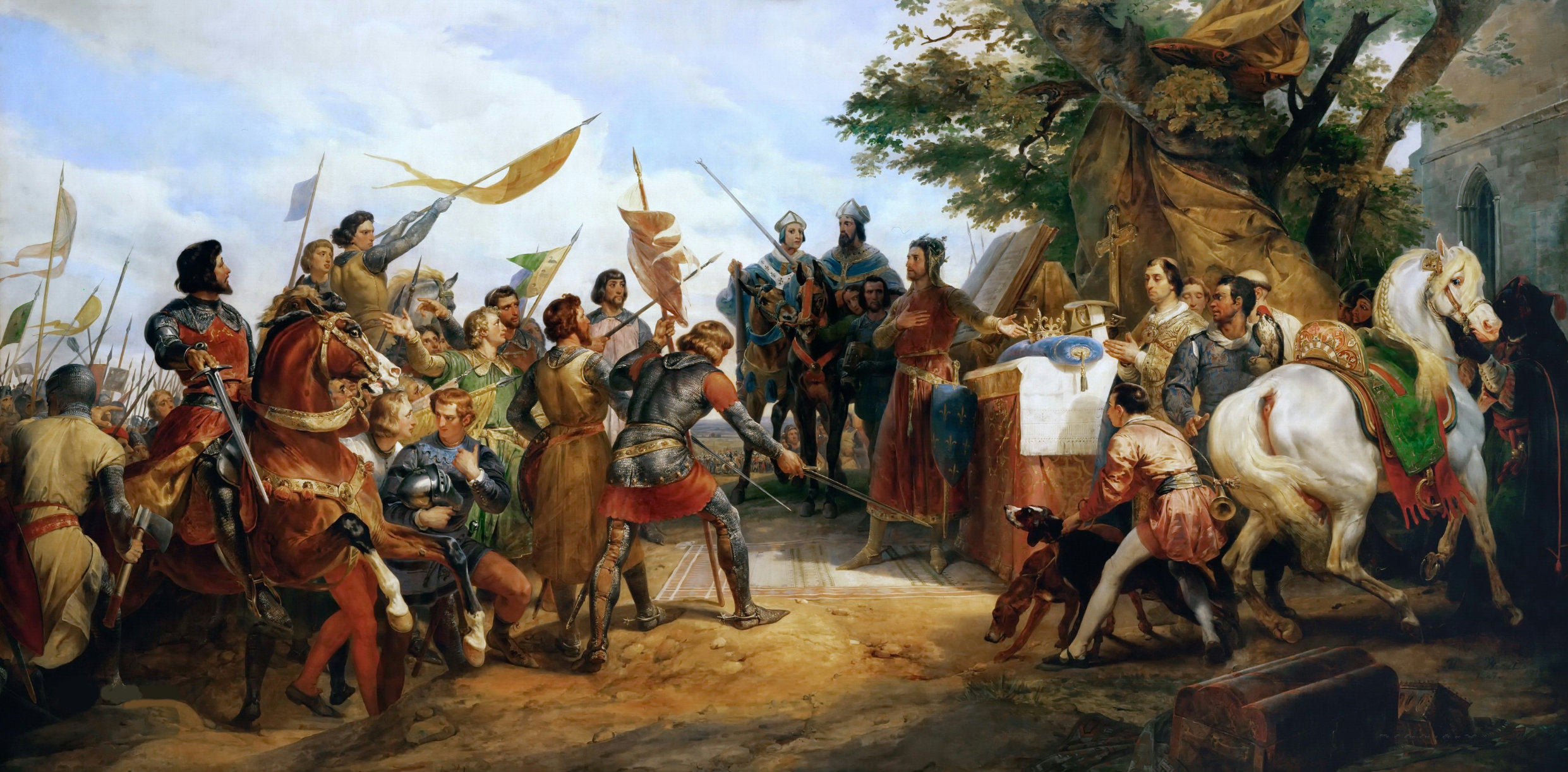
- The Battle of Bouvines; Horace Vernet, 1827
Date	27 July 1214
Location	Bouvines, County of Flanders, Kingdom of France 50°34′48″N 3°13′30″E
Result	French victory; Truce of Chinon: Deposition of Otto IV
Territorial changes	Collapse of the Angevin Empire

Belligerents
Kingdom of France: Duchy of Burgundy; County of Champagne; County of Dreux; County of Ponthieu; County of Saint-Pol; County of Beaumont; County of Soissons; County of Perche; County of Auxerre; County of Nevers; Lordship of Nemours; Lordship of Coucy; Viscounty of Melun; Duchy of Normandy; Duchy of Brittany Prince-Bishopric of Liège	Holy Roman; Empire: County of Hainaut; Kingdom of Germany; Duchy of Brabant; County of Louvain; Duchy of Lorraine; County of Holland; County of Namur; Duchy of Limburg; Duchy of Saxony; County Palatine of the Rhine; County of Tecklenburg; County of Katzenelnbogen; Free imperial city of Dortmund; County of Flanders; Kingdom of England; County of Boulogne

Commanders and leaders
Philip II (centre); Robert II, Count of Dreux (left flank); Eudes III of Burgundy (right flank); List: centre: Bartholomew of Roye; William of Garlande; William II des Barres; Enguerrand III of Coucy; Gauthier II of Nemours; Girard Scophe left flank: Philip of Dreux; William II of Ponthieu; Peter II of Courtenay; Thomas of St. Valery right flank: Matthew II of Montmorency; William I of Sancerre; Walter III of Châtillon; Peter of Remi; Jean, Count of Beaumont; Adam II of Melun other command: Thomas of Perche; Stephen Longchamp	Otto IV (centre); Renaud of Boulogne (POW) (right flank); Ferrand of Flanders (POW) (left flank); List: centre: Theobald of Lorraine (POW); William of Holland; Henry of Brabant; Philip II of Courtenay-Namur; Henry III of Limburg; Conrad of Dortmund right flank: William Longespée (POW); Hugh of Boves left flank: Ferrand of Flanders (POW); Arnulf IV of Oudenaarde

Strength
Total: 6,000–7,000; 1,200–1,360 knights 300 mounted sergeants 5,000–6,000 infantry	Total: 8,800–9,000; 1,300–1,500 knights 7,500 infantry

Casualties and losses
Comparatively light 2 knights killed Unknown infantry losses	Heavy; 169 knights killed 131 knights captured Heavy infantry losses

The Battle of Bouvines took place on 27 July 1214 near the town of Bouvines in the County of Flanders. It was the concluding battle of the Anglo-French War of 1213–1214. Although estimates on the number of troops vary considerably among modern historians, at Bouvines, a French army commanded by King Philip Augustus routed a larger allied army led by Holy Roman Emperor Otto IV in one of the rare pitched battles of the High Middle Ages and one of the most decisive medieval engagements.

In early 1214, a coalition was assembled against King Philip Augustus of France, consisting of Otto IV, King John of England, Count Ferrand of Flanders, Count Renaud of Boulogne, Duke Henry I of Brabant, Count William I of Holland, Duke Theobald I of Lorraine, and Duke Henry III of Limburg. Its objective was to reverse the conquests made by Philip earlier in his reign.

After initial manoeuvring in late July, battle was offered near Bouvines on 27 July. The long allied column deployed slowly into battle order, leaving the allies at a disadvantage. The superior discipline and training of the French knights allowed them to carry out a series of devastating charges, shattering the Flemish knights on the allied left wing. In the centre, the allied knights and infantry under Otto enjoyed initial success, scattering the French urban infantry and nearly killing Philip. A counterattack by French knights smashed the isolated Allied infantry and Otto's entire centre division fell back. Otto fled the battle and his knightly followers were defeated by the French knights, who went on to capture the Imperial eagle standard. With the allied centre and left wing routed, only the soldiers of the right wing under Renaud of Boulogne and William de Longespée held on. They were killed, captured or driven from the field. A pursuit was not conducted as it was nearly dark.

The crushing French victory dashed English and Flemish hopes of regaining their lost territories. Having lost all credibility as emperor following the battle, Otto IV was deposed by Pope Innocent III, leading to Frederick II's accession to the Imperial throne. King John was compelled to hand over Anjou, the ancient patrimony of the Angevin kings of England, to Philip in a peace settlement. This confirmed the collapse of the Angevin Empire. The disaster at Bouvines forever altered the political situation in England, as John was so weakened that his discontented barons forced him to agree to Magna Carta in 1215. Counts Ferrand, Renaud and Longespée were captured and imprisoned. The balance of power shifted, with the popes of the 13th century increasingly seeking the support of a powerful France. Philip had achieved remarkable success in the expansion of his realm and by the end of his reign, in 1223, had not only laid the foundations for the era of Capetian pre-eminence in Europe which followed and marked much of the Late Middle Ages, but also those of the absolutism that came to define the Ancien Régime.

== Prelude ==
In 1214, Count Ferdinand of Flanders desired the return of the cities of Aire-sur-la-Lys and Saint-Omer, which he had recently lost to King Philip II of France, in the Treaty of Pont-à-Vendin. He thus broke allegiance with Philip and assembled a broad coalition including Emperor Otto IV, King John of England, Duke Henry I of Brabant, Count William I of Holland, Duke Theobald I of Lorraine, and Duke Henry III of Limburg.

The campaign was planned by John, who was the fulcrum of the alliance; his plan was to draw the French away from Paris southward towards his forces and keep them occupied, while the main army, under Emperor Otto IV, marched on Paris from the north. John's plan was followed initially, but the allies in the north moved slowly. John, after two encounters with the French, retreated to Aquitaine on 3 July.

On 23 July, having summoned his vassals, Philip had an army consisting of 6,000 to 8,000 soldiers. The Emperor finally succeeded in concentrating his forces at Valenciennes, although this did not include John, and in the interval Philip had counter-marched northward and regrouped. Philip now took the offensive himself, and after manoeuvring to obtain good ground for his cavalry he offered battle on 27 July, on the plain east of Bouvines and the river Marque.

Otto was surprised by the speed of his enemy and was thought to have been caught unprepared by Philip, who probably deliberately lured Otto into his trap. Otto decided to launch an attack on what was then the French rearguard.

The allied army drew up facing south-west towards Bouvines, the heavy cavalry on the wings and the infantry in one great mass in the centre, supported by a cavalry corps under Otto himself. The French army formed up opposite in a similar formation, cavalry on the wings, infantry, including the town militias, in the centre. Philip, with the cavalry reserve and the royal standard, the Oriflamme, positioned himself to the rear of the men on foot. It is said by William the Breton, chaplain to Philip at the battle, that the soldiers stood in line in a space of 40,000 steps (15 ha or 37 acres), which leaves very little clearance and predisposes to hand-to-hand fighting. William the Breton also says in his chronicle that "the two lines of combatants were separated by a small space".

== Order of battle ==
=== French ===
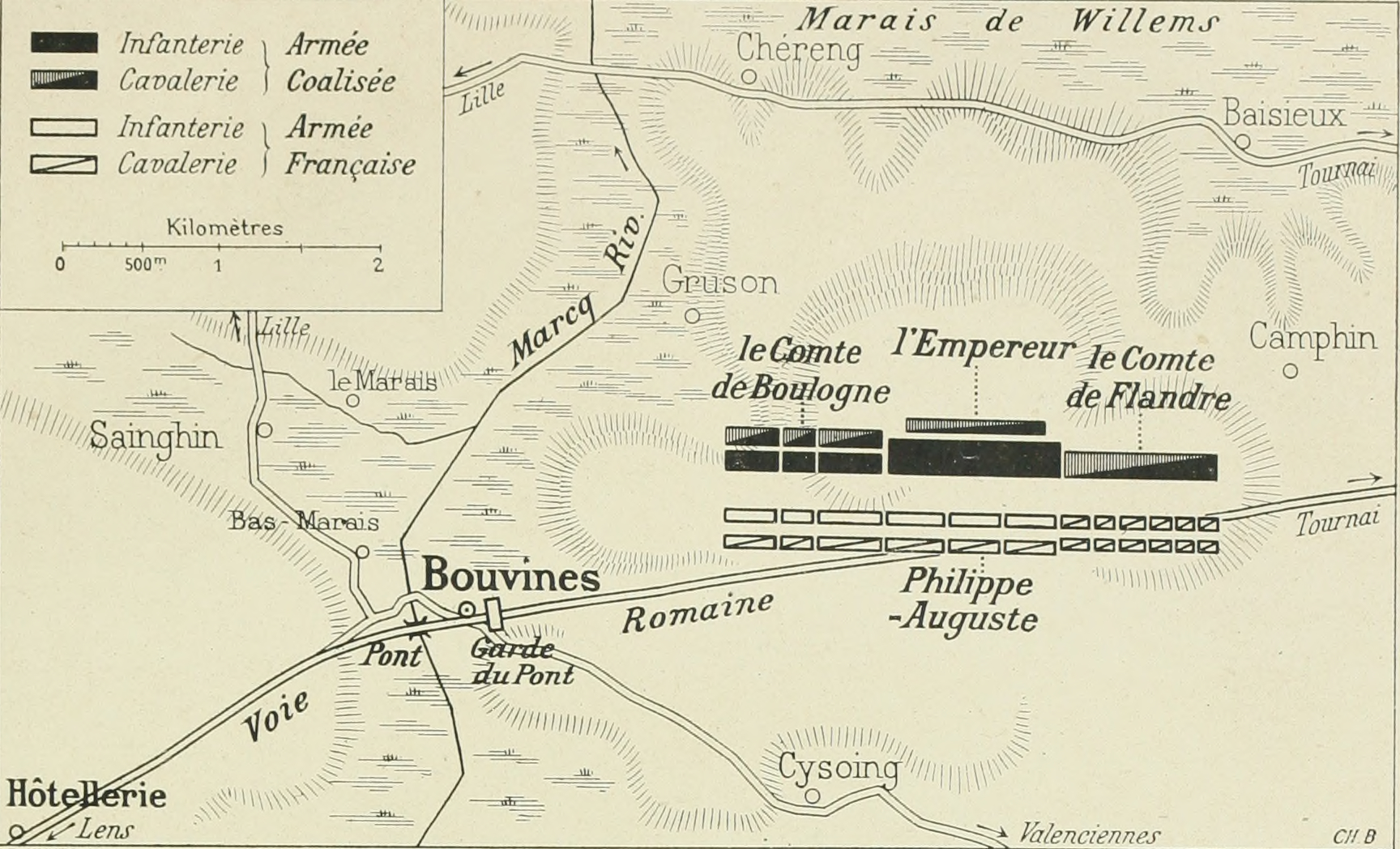
Pre-battle dispositions

The French army contained 1,200–1,360 knights (of whom 765 were from the royal demesne) and 300 mounted sergeants. Philip had launched an appeal to the municipalities in northern France, in order to obtain their support. Sixteen of the thirty-nine municipalities of the royal demesne answered the call to arms. They provided 3,160 infantry, broken down as: Amiens 250, Arras 1,000, Beauvais 500, Compiegne 200, Corbie 200, Bruyeres 120, Cerny and Crepy-en-Laonnais 80, Crandelain 40, Hesdin 80, Montreuil-sur-Mer 150, Noyon 150, Roye 100, Soissons 160, and Vailly 50. The balance of the infantry, possibly another 2,000 men, was composed of mercenaries. The other communes of the royal demesne were supposed to provide a further 1,980 infantry, but it is doubtful that they did. In total, the royal army totalled approximately 6,000–7,000 men. The royal fleur-de-lis standard was borne by Galon or Gales of Montigny.

The royal army was divided into three parts, or "battles":

- The right wing, composed of the knights of Champagne and Burgundy, was commanded by Eudes, Duke of Burgundy, and his lieutenants: Gaucher of Châtillon, Count of Saint-Pol, Count Guillaume I de Sancerre, Count de Beaumont, Mathieu of Montmorency and Adam II Viscount of Melun. In the front of the right wing were men-at-arms and militia from Burgundy, Champagne, and Picardy led by 150 mounted sergeants from Soissons.
- The central battle was led by Philip Augustus and his chief knights – Guillaume des Barres, Bartholomé de Roye, Girard Scophe, Guillaume de Garland, Enguerrand of Coucy and Gautier of Nemours. In front of the King and his 175 knights were 2,150 infantry from the towns of the Île de France and Normandy.
- The left wing was led by Robert of Dreux, supported by Count William of Ponthieu. The main body of the left wing consisted of Bretons and militia from Dreux, Perche, Ponthieu, and Vimeux.
- The bridge of Bouvines, the only means of retreat across the marshes, was guarded by 150 sergeants-at-arms, who also formed the French reserve.

=== Allied ===
Otto's army contained some 1,300–1,500 knights: 600–650 Flemish, 425–500 Hainaulter and 275–350 from elsewhere. He also fielded approximately 7,500 infantry, to give a total force of just under 9,000 men. The imperial army was also formed up in three battles:

- The left flank, under the command of Ferrand of Flanders with his Flemish knights – directed by Arnaud of Oudenaarde. The infantry were from Flanders and Hainaut.
- The centre was under the command of Otto and of Theobald, Duke of Lorraine, Henry, Duke of Brabant, and Philip Courtenay, Marquis of Namur. It included many Saxons and infantry from Brabant and Germany. In the front of the battle stood German pike phalanxes. Saxon infantry formed the second line. Otto stood between these with 50 German knights.
- The right flank, under the command of Renaud de Dammartin, included Brabant infantry and English knights, the latter under the command of the Earl of Salisbury, William Longespée.
- On the extreme right, English archers supported the flank of both the Brabant infantry and the nobles of the two Lorraines (i.e. of the Duchy of Lorraine and the County of Bar).

== Battle ==
=== Allied left ===
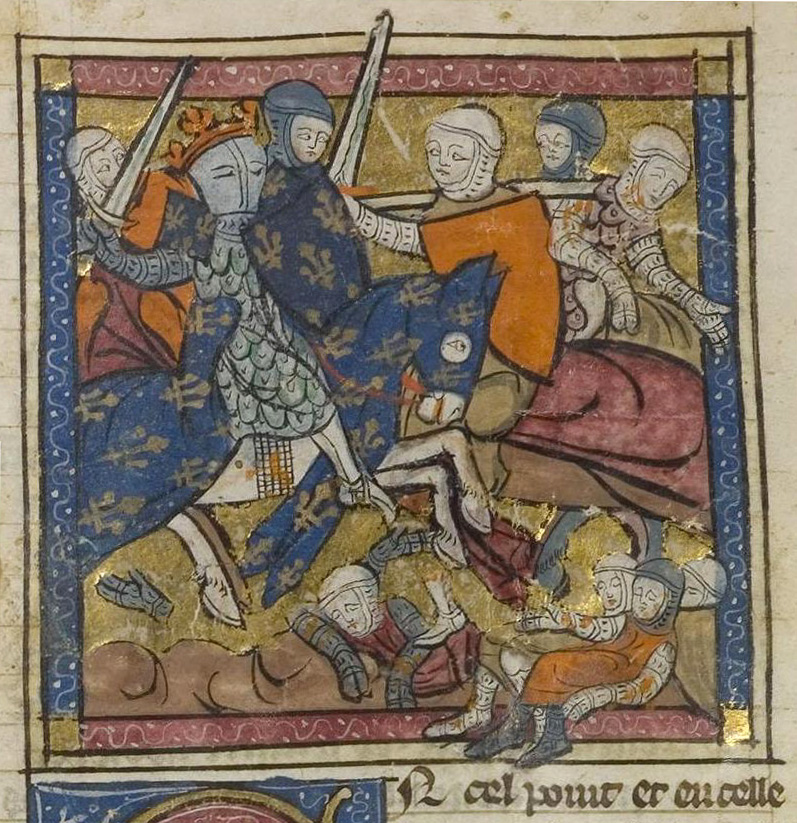
The capture of Ferdinand, Count of Flanders in an illustration of the battle made around 1330.

The battle opened with an attack by 150 light cavalrymen from the Abbey of Saint-Médard de Soissons against the Flemish knights on the allied left, aiming to throw it into confusion. The Flemish knights easily drove off the unarmoured horsemen. Some Flemish knights left their formations and chased the retreating light cavalry; 180 French knights from Champagne in turn attacked and killed or captured the over-aggressive Flemish knights. The Count of Flanders counter-attacked with his entire force of 600 knights and threw the French back.

Gaucher de Châtillon launched his 30 knights at the Flemish force, followed by a further 250 knights. They carried out a continuous series of charges, and halted the allied advance. Many knights on both sides fell from their horses in the first clash. The French were better ordered than the more loosely formed Flemish knights, and the allied ranks grew thinner as they were assaulted by the compact French masses. Châtillon and Melun with their knights broke through the ranks of their Flemish counterparts, then wheeled and struck them from the rear, constantly switching targets. St. Pol's knights and the Burgundians engaged in an exhausting struggle against the Flemings, taking no prisoners. The Duke of Burgundy's horse was killed and the Duke thrown to the ground, but he was saved by his knights, who beat off the Flemish and found him a fresh horse.

The Flemings fought on for three hours despite their increasingly desperate situation, driven by knightly honour. Finally, the wounded and unhorsed Count of Flanders was captured by two French knights, triggering the collapse of his knights' morale.

=== Centre ===
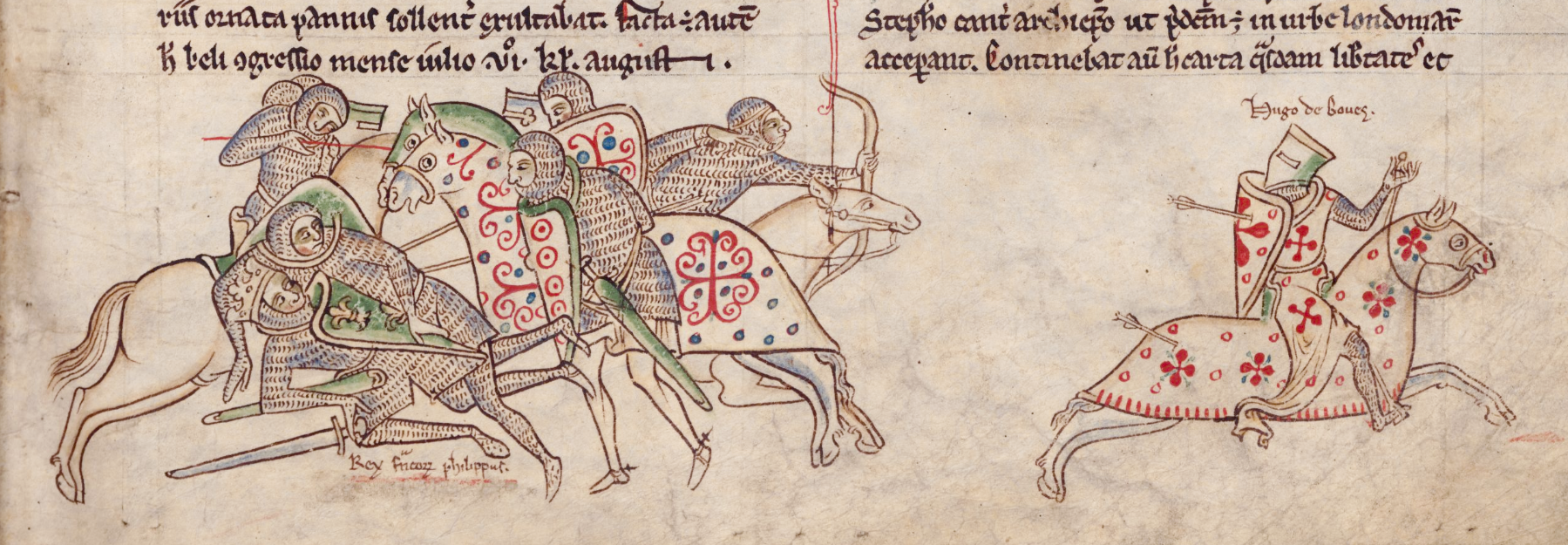
King Philip unhorsed (shown wearing crown at left) and Hugh of Boves at right fleeing the Battle of Bouvines, from the Chronica Majora, c. 1250, written and illustrated by Matthew Paris.

The French urban militia infantry, 2,150 strong, were gathered under the Oriflamme in the centre, in front of Philip's knights and the fleur-de-lis standard. Soon after deploying, they were attacked by allied knights and infantry under Otto and thrown back. Otto and his knights had nearly reached the French king when they were halted by French knights. The allied infantrymen broke through to Philip and his handful of knightly companions, unhorsing him with their hooked pikes. The French king's armour deflected an enemy lance and saved his life. Galon or Gales de Montigny used the royal standard to signal for help and another knight gave Philip a fresh horse.

The allied infantry used daggers to stab unhorsed French knights through the openings in their helmets and other weak spots in their armour. The Norman knight Etienne de Longchamp was killed in this way and the French suffered heavy losses. After repeated French counterattacks and a prolonged fight the allies were thrown back.

The battle in the centre was now a mêlée between the two mounted reserves led by the King and the Emperor in person. The French knight Pierre Mauvoisin nearly captured Otto and his horse and Gérard la Truie stabbed the Emperor with a dagger, which bounced off his coat of mail and struck Otto's horse in the eye, killing it. Otto was saved by four German lords and their followers. As the French sent more knights to attack him personally he fled the field. The German knights fought to the bitter end to save their emperor, all being killed or captured. The Imperial Standard with the eagle and dragon was captured by the French knights, who brought it to their king. By this time, allied resistance in the centre had ceased.

=== Allied right ===
Meanwhile, on the French left Robert de Dreux's troops were at first pressed by men led by William Longespée. William Longespée was unhorsed and taken prisoner by Philip of Dreux, the Bishop of Beauvais, and the English soldiers fled. Mathieu de Montmorency captured twelve enemy imperial banners, in memory of which feat twelve more eagles were added to the existing four on the Montmorency coat of arms.

=== Last stand ===
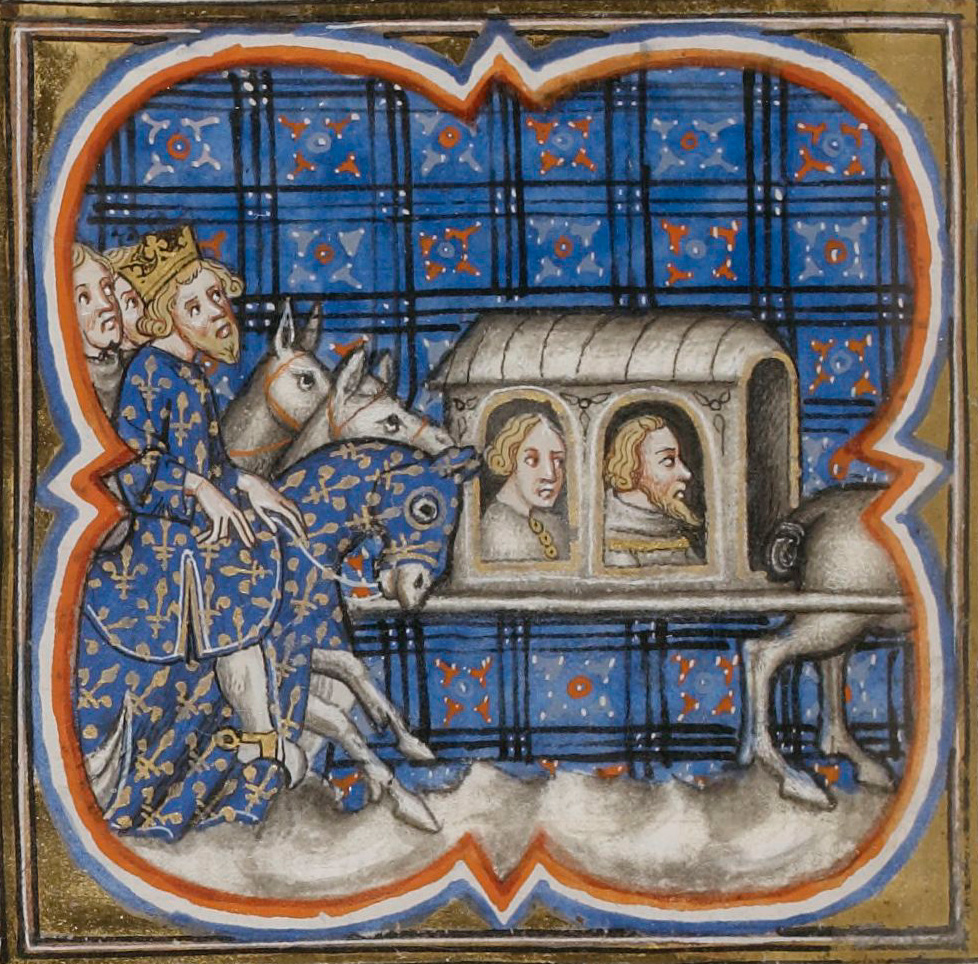
Ferrand of Flanders and Reginald of Boulogne being conveyed as prisoners to Paris (from the Grandes Chroniques de France, c. 1375–1380). Ferrand was released in 1227 and died soon after of a disease contracted in prison. Renaud was kept in chains and killed himself in 1227.

The day was already decided in favour of the French when their wings began to close inwards to cut off the retreat of the imperial centre. The battle closed with the celebrated stand of Reginald of Boulogne (Renaud de Dammartin), a former vassal of King Philip, who formed a ring of 400–700 Brabançon pikemen. They defied every attack by the French cavalry, while Reginald made repeated sorties with his small force of knights. Eventually, long after the Imperial army had retreated, the Brabant schiltrom was overrun by a charge of 50 knights and 1,000–2,000 infantry under Thomas de St. Valery. Reginald was taken prisoner in the melee. A pursuit was not conducted owing to the approaching nightfall and a fear that the prisoners might escape. The French formations were recalled using trumpets.

== Aftermath ==
The French cavalry had a number of knights killed; the French infantry casualties are not recorded. The Allies had 169 knights killed and "heavy" but unquantified losses among the infantry; including between 400 and 700 Brabant infantry killed. As well as Reginald of Boulogne two other counts were captured by the French, Hainaut Ferrand and William Longespée, as well as twenty-five barons and over a hundred knights.

The battle ended the threat from both Otto and John. According to Jean Favier, Bouvines is "one of the most decisive and symbolic battles in the history of France". For Philippe Contamine "the Battle of Bouvines had both important consequences and a great impact". Ferdinand Lot called it a "medieval Austerlitz".

Philip returned to Paris triumphant, marching his captive prisoners behind him in a long procession, as his subjects lined the streets to greet the victorious king. In the aftermath of the battle, Otto retreated to his castle of Harzburg and was soon overthrown as Holy Roman Emperor by Frederick II, who had already been recognised as emperor in the south a year and a half earlier. Count Ferdinand remained imprisoned following his defeat, while King John obtained a five-year truce, on very lenient terms given the circumstances. Longespée was eventually exchanged for a high-ranking French captive, but the Count of Boulogne was imprisoned in a small cell, chained to a log and with little room for movement. He eventually committed suicide in 1227.

Philip's decisive victory was crucial to the political situation in England. The battle ended all hope of a restoration of the Angevin Empire. So weakened was the defeated King John that he soon needed to submit to his barons' demands and agree to Magna Carta in 1215, limiting the power of the crown and establishing the basis for common law.

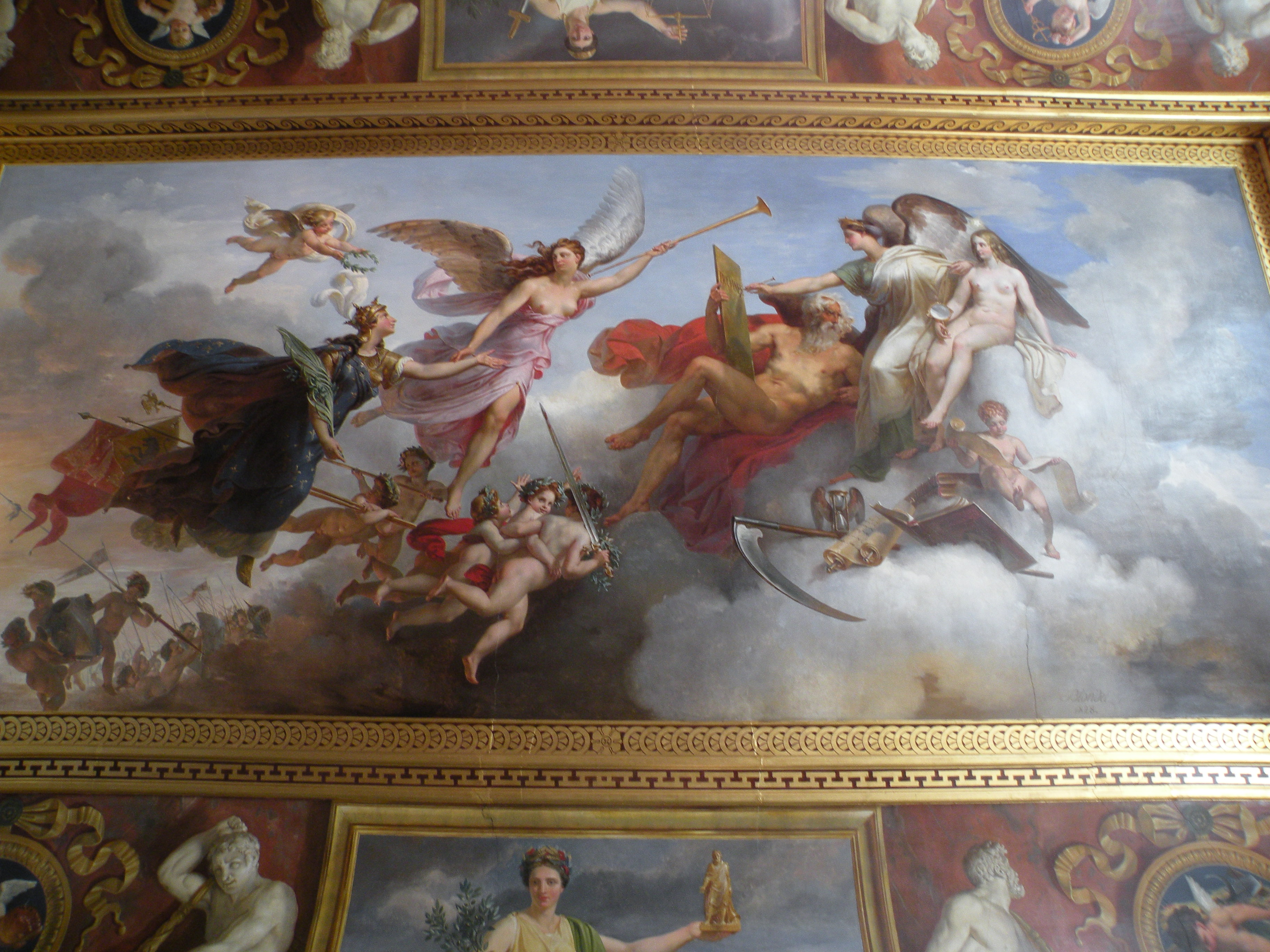
France Victorious at Bouvines, allegorical painting by Merry-Joseph Blondel, 1828, in the decoration of the Louvre

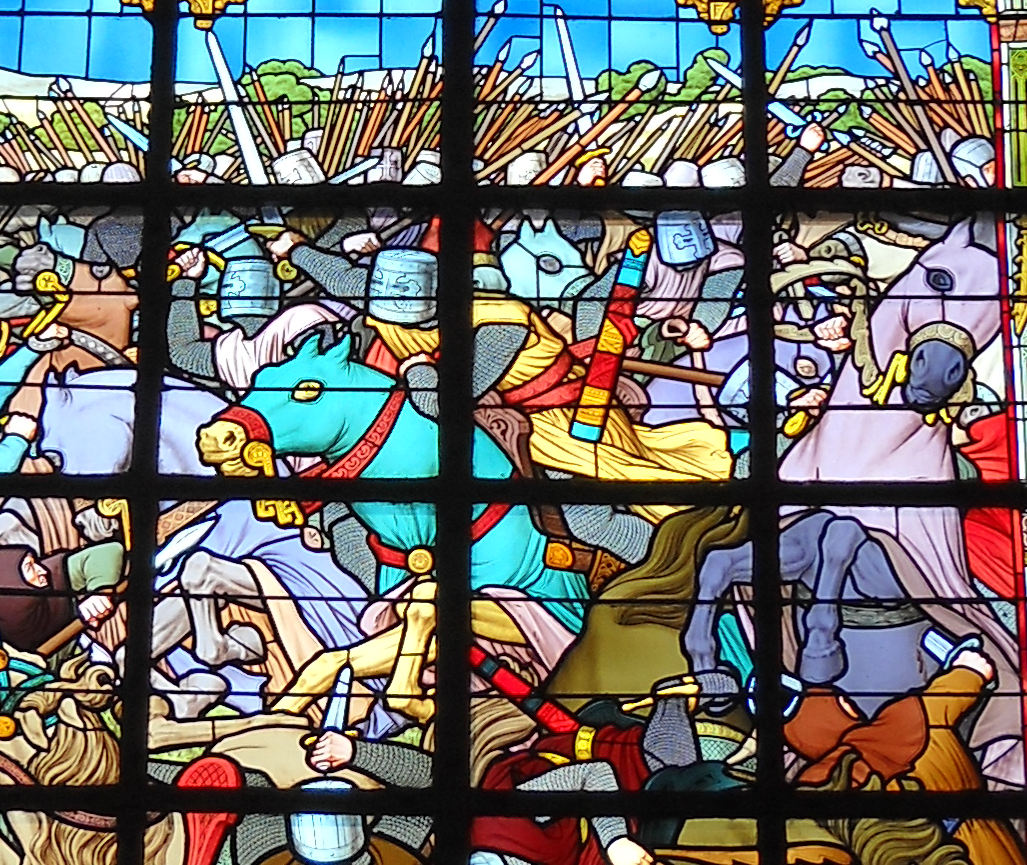
A detail of one of the stained-glass windows installed in the parish church of Bouvines in 1914

== Commemoration ==
In thanksgiving for the victory, Philip Augustus founded the Abbey of Notre Dame de la Victoire, between Senlis and Mont l'Evêque. In 1914, to mark the seventh centenary, Félix Dehau had the parish church of Bouvines rebuilt with a number of stained-glass windows representing the history of the battle. In 2014, the eighth centenary was commemorated in Bouvines by an association called Bouvines 2014. A series of events, including an official ceremony and a show called "Bouvines la Bataille", attracted more than 6,000 viewers in Bouvines.

== See also ==
- Anglo-French Wars

== Sources ==
- Baldwin, John W. (1986). The Government of Philip Augustus: Foundations of French Royal Power in the Middle Ages. Berkeley, Cal.: University of California Press. ISBN 978-0-520-07391-3.
- "Le 700è anniversaire en 1914". Bouvines la Bataille (in French). Association Bouvines. 2014.
- "Son et Lumière". Bouvines la Bataille (in French). Association Bouvines. 2014.
- Bradbury, Jim (1996). Philip Augustus: King of France 1180–1223. Florence: Taylor and Francis. ISBN 978-1-315-84582-1.
- Chisholm, Hugh, ed. (1911). "Bouvines" . Encyclopædia Britannica. Vol. 4 (11th ed.). Cambridge University Press. pp. 336–337. OCLC 221022251
- Contamine, Philippe (1992). Histoire militaire de la France (in French). Paris: PUF. ISBN 978-2-213-03139-2.
- DeVries, Kelly (2006). Battles of the Medieval World: 1000–1500. London: Amber. ISBN 978-1-904687-64-1.
- Dougherty, Martin J. (2016). Weapons and Fighting Techiniques of the Medieval Warrior. Book Sales. ISBN 978-0-7858-3425-0.
- Duby, Georges (1990). The Battle of Bouvines According to William the Breton (prose account). Translated by Catherine Tihanyi. Berkeley: University of California Press. ISBN 978-0-520-06238-2. Archived from the original on 17 June 2010.
- Eysenbach, Gabriel (1848). History of Heraldry and the Science of Coats-of-Arms. Tours: Ad Mame. OCLC 931242374.
- Favier, Jean (1993). Dictionnaire de la France médiévale (in French). Paris: Fayard. ISBN 978-2-213-03139-2. OCLC 231581577.
- France, John (2015). "The Battle of Bouvines 27 July 1214". In Halfond, Gregory I. (ed.). The Medieval Way of War: Studies in Medieval Military History in Honor of Bernard S. Bachrach. Farnham, Surrey: Ashgate Publishing. pp. 251–271. ISBN 978-1-4724-1958-3.
- Gillingham, John (1984). The Angevin Empire. London: Hodder Arnold. ISBN 978-0-340-74115-3.
- Heath, Ian (1990). Armies of Feudal Europe 1066–1300. Goring-by-Sea, Sussex: Wargames Research Group. OCLC 28927648.
- Kamp, Norbert (1995). "FEDERICO II di Svevia, imperatore, re di Sicilia e di Gerusalemme, re dei Romani". In Farinacci-Fedrigo (ed.). Dizionario Biografico degli Italiani (in Italian). Vol. 45. Rome: Istituto della Enciclopedia italiana. OCLC 35265711.
- Kibler, William W.; Zinn, Grover A. (2017). Routledge Revivals: Medieval France (1995): An Encyclopedia. Taylor & Francis. ISBN 978-1-351-66566-7.
- Lot, Ferdinand (1941). La France, des origines à la guerre de cent ans (in French). Paris: Gallimard. OCLC 489885191.
- Morel, Auguste (1864). De Paris a Cologne, a Bruxelles, a Senlis, a Laon, a Dinant, a Givet, a Luxemburg, a Trèves, a Maestricht: itinéraire descriptif et historique (in French). Paris: Hachette. OCLC 918025600.
- Sumption, Jonathan (1990). Trial by Battle. London: Faber and Faber. ISBN 978-0-571-20095-5. OCLC 819663446.
- Titterton, James (2025). Bouvines 1214: Philippe Augustus and the Battle for France. Oxford: Osprey Publishing. ISBN 9781472868824.
- Verbruggen, J.F. (1997) [1954]. The Art of Warfare in Western Europe During the Middle Ages: From the Eighth Century to 1340 [De Krijgskunst in West-Europa in de Middeleeuwen, IXe tot begin XIVe eeuw]. Translated by Willard, S. (2nd ed.). Suffolk: Boydell Press. ISBN 0-85115-630-4.
