= Anglo-French War (1213–1214) =

Conquest war of Philip II against England

- Part of the Capet–Plantagenet feud
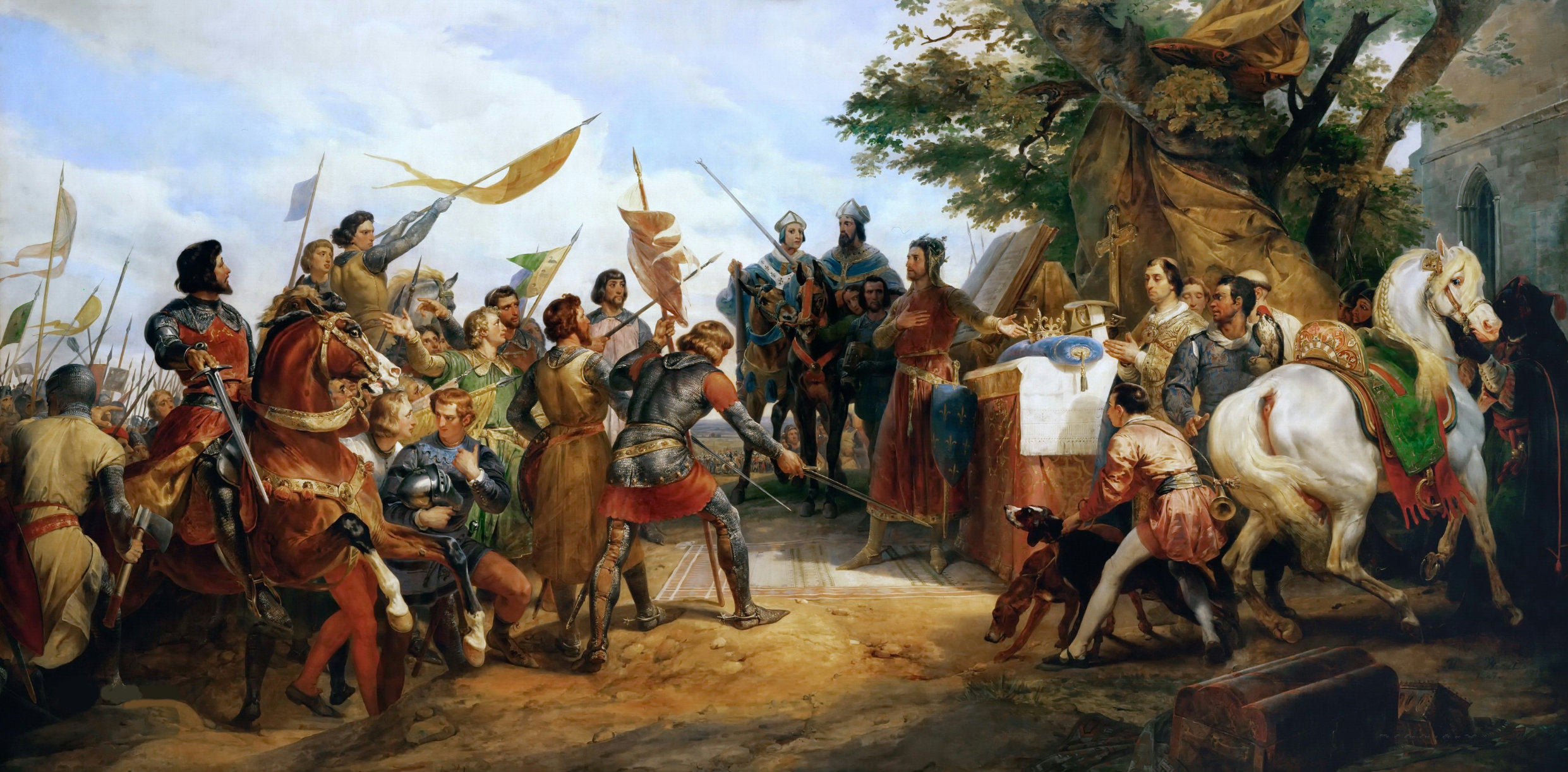
- Philip II of France at The Battle of Bouvines by Horace Vernet, 1827
Date	1213–1214
Location	France, Flanders, Normandy
Result	French victory: Truce of Chinon; Collapse of the Angevin Empire; End of the German throne dispute

Belligerents
Kingdom of France	Angevin Empire; Kingdom of England; Duchy of Aquitaine; Holy Roman Empire County of Flanders County of Boulogne

Commanders and leaders
Philip II of France	John, King of England; Emperor Otto IV; Renaud of Boulogne (surrendered); Henry I, Duke of Brabant

The Anglo-French War was a major medieval conflict that pitted the Kingdom of France against the Kingdom of England and various other states. It was fought in an attempt to curb the rising power of King Philip II of France and regain the Angevin continental possessions King John of England lost to him a decade earlier. It is widely regarded as the first anti-French coalition war and came to an end at the decisive Battle of Bouvines at which Philip defeated England and its allies.

The Duchy of Normandy, once a site of conflict between Richard I of England and Philip II, grew to be one of the hot spots of medieval Anglo-French wars as the King of England had to defend a continental holding that was so close to Paris. In 1202, Philip II launched an invasion of Normandy that culminated in the six-month Siege of Château Gaillard, which led to the conquest of the duchy and of neighbouring territories.

In 1214, when Pope Innocent III assembled an alliance of states against France, John agreed. The allies met Philip near Bouvines and were soundly defeated. The French victory resulted in the conquest of Flanders and put an end to further attempts from John to regain his lost territories.

This conflict was an episode of a century-long struggle between the House of Capet and the House of Plantagenet over the Angevin domains in France, which started with Henry II's accession to the English throne in 1154 and his rivalry with Louis VII and ended with Louis IX's triumph over Henry III at the Battle of Taillebourg in 1242.

== Aftermath ==
After the disastrous military campaigns in France and the loss of much of the Angevin domains, King John became increasingly unpopular and a civil war erupted in England as lords challenged him. Some of the rebellious barons, faced with an uncompromising king, turned to Prince Louis, the son and heir apparent of King Philip and grandson-in-law of King Henry II of England. Despite discouragement from his father and from Pope Innocent III, Louis sailed to England with an army on 14 June 1216, captured Winchester and soon controlled over half of the English kingdom. However, just when it seemed like England was about to be his, King John's sudden death in October caused the rebellious barons to desert Louis in favour of John's nine-year-old son, Henry III.

With William Marshal acting as regent, a call for the English "to defend our land" against the French led to a reversal of fortunes on the battlefield. After his army was beaten at Lincoln on 20 May 1217 and a fleet led by Eustace the Monk, attempting to bring French reinforcements, was defeated off the coast of Sandwich on 24 August, Louis was forced to make peace on English terms.

The principal provisions of the Treaty of Lambeth were an amnesty for English rebels, Louis to undertake not to attack England again and 10,000 marks to be given to Louis. The effect of the treaty was that Louis agreed that he had never been the legitimate King of England.

== Bibliography ==
- Grant, R.G (2007). Battle: a visual journey through 5,000 years of combat. Dorling Kindersley. p. 109.
- Kohn, George Childs (31 October 2013). Dictionary of Wars. Routledge. ISBN 978-1-135-95494-9.
