= Wauchier de Denain =

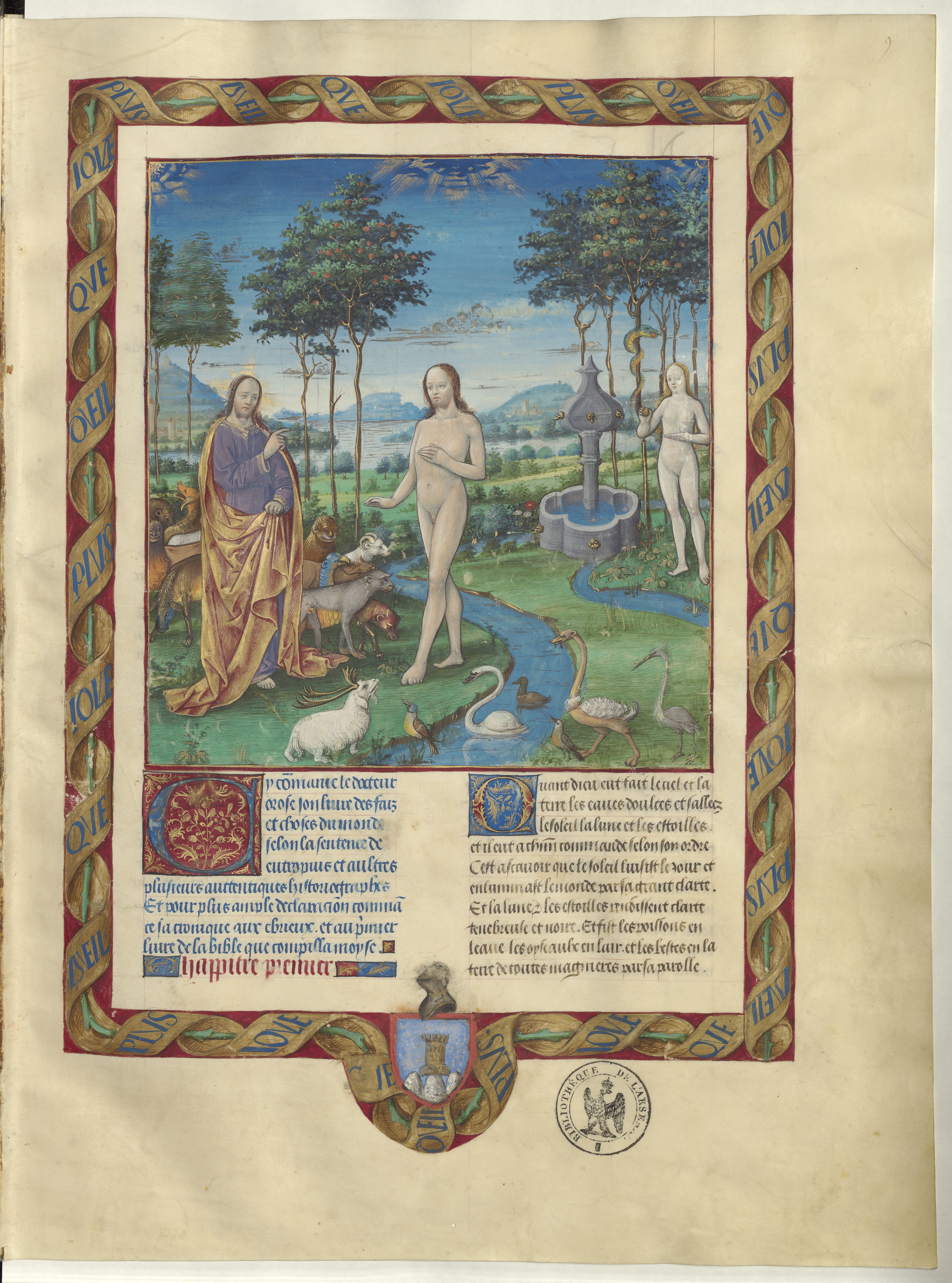
Adam and Eve, illustration from a copy of Wauchier's Histoire ancienne jusqu'à César

Wauchier de Denain (also spelled "Gauchier de Donaing" and "Gautier de Denet") was a French writer and translator in the langue d'oïl, active at the start of the 13th century. He is most notable for possibly writing the first and second continuations of Chrétien de Troyes' Perceval.

In the introduction to his complete translation of the Perceval and its Continuations, Nigel Bryant has written: ″The First Continuation is completely anonymous; the authorship of the Second is hard to attribute, since at the point where the writer identifies himself none of the scribes of the extant manuscripts could agree on a spelling or even a version of the name ..."
