= Perceval, the Story of the Grail =

Unfinished romance by Chrétien de Troyes

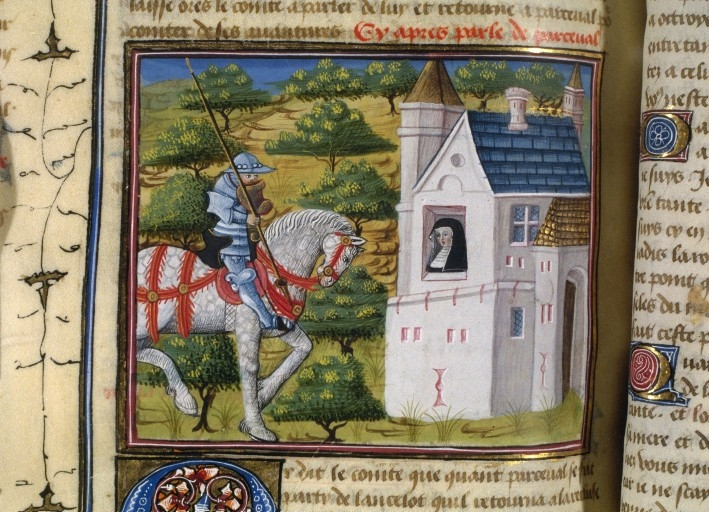
- Perceval arrives at the hermitage in a 15th-century illustration of Perceval
- Original title: French: Perceval ou le Conte du Graal
- Author(s): Chrétien de Troyes
- Patron: Philip I, Count of Flanders
- Dedicated to: Philip I, Count of Flanders
- Language: Old French
- Date: Between 1182 and 1190
- Genre: Chivalric romance
- Verse form: Octosyllable rhyming couplets
- Length: 9,000 lines
- Subject: Arthurian legend

Perceval, the Story of the Grail (French: Perceval ou le Conte du Graal) is an unfinished Arthurian verse romance written by Chrétien de Troyes in Old French during the late 12th century. Starting as the eponymous tale of the young Perceval, the story breaks off and follows an adventure of Gawain of similar length, that also remains incomplete. Later authors added 54,000 more lines to the original 9,000 in the series of continuations of Perceval, known collectively as the Four Continuations or the Perceval Continuations, as well as further related texts.

Perceval is the earliest recorded account of what was to become the Quest for the Holy Grail. However, it describes it only as a golden grail (a serving dish) in the central scene, does not call it "holy" and treats a lance, appearing at the same time, as equally significant.

== Background ==
Perceval is dedicated to Chrétien's patron Philip I, Count of Flanders. Chrétien claimed to be working from a source given to him by Philip. His poem was written in Old French during the 1180s or 1190s and likely left unfinished because of the death of either Philip in 1191, while crusading at Acre, or the death of the author himself. Some scholars argue that during the time Chrétien was writing Perceval, there was a political crisis taking place between the monarchy and the aristocracy, which included his patron, which may have influenced Chrétien's work. There are some 9,000 lines in total, whereas the other romances by Chrétien seldom exceed 7,000 lines.

There are possible parallels in Perceval with the Irish mythological race of the Tuatha Dé Danann. The race has three central talismans, a spear, a cauldron, and a sword, that correlate with the spear, grail, and sword present in Perceval. Chrétien's Perceval also includes many similarities to the Irish saga The Boyhood Deeds of Fionn. The main character, Fionn mac Cumhaill, is raised in isolation and undergoes many adventures akin to those of Perceval, suggesting that the narrative may have been a source of inspiration for Chrétien.

== Synopsis ==
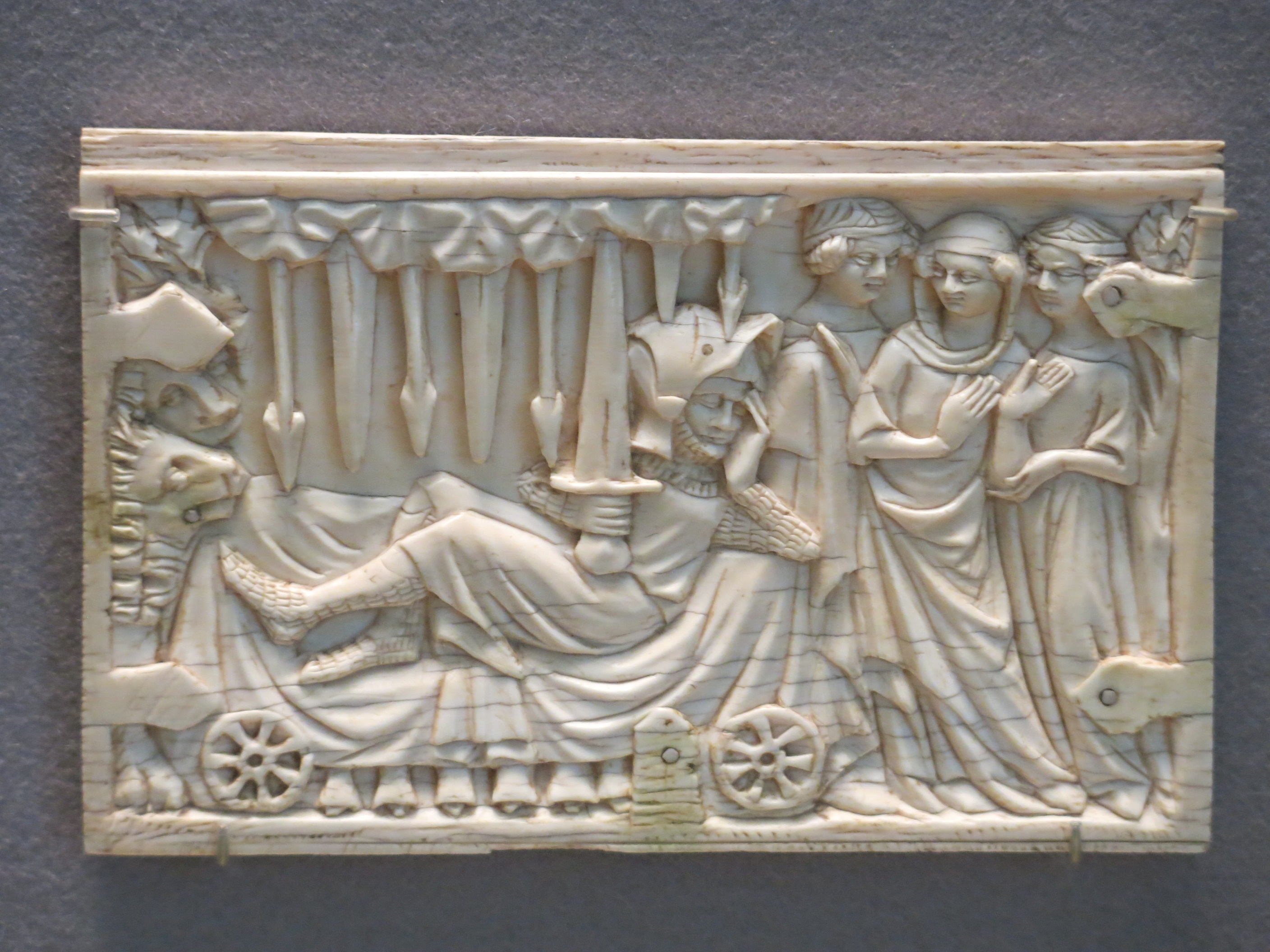
The story's scene of Gawain on the Perilous Bed (Gauvain au lit périlleux) engraved in a 14th-century ivory

The poem opens with Perceval of Wales (Perceval le Gallois), whose mother has raised him apart from civilization in the Welsh woods. While out riding one day, he encounters a group of knights and realizes he wants to be one. Despite his mother's objections, the boy heads to King Arthur's court, where a young girl predicts greatness for him. Kay taunts him and slaps the girl, but Perceval amazes everyone by killing a knight who had been troubling King Arthur and taking his vermilion armor. He then sets out for adventure. He trains under the experienced Gornemant, then falls in love with and rescues Gornemant's niece Blancheflor. Perceval captures her assailants and sends them to King Arthur's court to proclaim Perceval's vow of revenge on Sir Kay.

Perceval remembers that his mother fainted when he went off to become a knight, and goes to visit her. During his journey, he comes across the Fisher King fishing in a boat on a river, who invites him to stay at his castle. While there, Perceval witnesses a strange procession in which young men and women carry magnificent objects from one chamber to another. First comes a young man carrying a bleeding lance, then two boys carrying candelabra. Then a beautiful young girl emerges bearing an elaborately decorated graal. Finally another maiden carried a silver platter. They passed before him at each course of the meal. Perceval, who had been trained by his guardian Gornemant not to talk too much, remains silent through all of this. He wakes up the next morning alone and resumes his journey home. He encounters a girl in mourning, who admonishes him for not asking about the grail, as that would have healed the wounded king. He also learns that his mother has died.

Perceval captures another knight and sends him to King Arthur's court with the same message as before. King Arthur sets out to find Perceval and, upon finding him, attempts to convince him to join the court. Perceval unknowingly challenges Sir Kay to a fight, in which he breaks Sir Kay's arm and exacts his revenge. Perceval agrees to join the court, but soon after a loathly lady enters and admonishes Perceval once again for failing to ask the Fisher King whom the grail served. No more is heard of Perceval except in a short later passage, in which a hermit explains that the grail contains a single host that miraculously sustains the Fisher King's wounded father.

The loathly lady announces other quests that the Knights of the Round Table proceed to take up and the remainder of the poem deals with Arthur's nephew and best knight Gawain, who has been challenged to a duel by Guiromelant, a knight who claims Gawain had slain his lord. Gawain offers a contrast and complement to Perceval's naiveté as a courtly knight having to function in un-courtly settings. An important episode is Gawain's liberation of a castle whose inhabitants include his long-lost mother, his grandmother Ygerne, and his sister Clarissant, whose existence was unknown to him. This tale also breaks off unfinished, interrupted when a messenger arrives at Arthur's court to request his presence at Gawain's upcoming fight against Guiromelant.

== Perceval Continuations ==
Over the following half century, multiple different authors attempted to continue the story begun by Chrétien.

=== First Continuation ===
The First Continuation (French: Première Continuation), also known as the Gawain Continuation (French: Continuation Gauvain), was a poem written around 1200, adding 9,500 to 19,600 lines (depending on the manuscripts, with three known distinct versions) to Chrétien's romance. It was once attributed to Wauchier de Denain ("Gauchier de Donaing"), and as such it is sometimes called the Pseudo-Wauchier Continuation.

The work exists in three versions: short, long, and mixed. The short version was the earliest and the most loosely linked to Chrétien's work, while the mixed version is considered to be the latest, drawing on both earlier versions. Roger Sherman Loomis believed that the short version, which was added to an existing Perceval manuscript ten or twenty years later, represents a version of the story that was originally independent of Chrétien's.

The First Continuation picks up the narrative of Gawain's adventures where Chrétien left off and focused on the adventures of Gawain and several other knights of the Arthurian universe. All versions include six "branches" (major episodes), more or less connected, which may have been inspired by independent tales pre-existing the composition of this continuation: "Guiromelant" which ends the episode begun in Chrétien's book as Gawain, his mother and grandmother are reunited with Arthur, and Gawain's sister Clarissant marries Guiromelant; "Brun de Branlant" which tells of a war of King Arthur against a rebellious vassal; "Caradoc" which tells the story of Caradoc Briefbras, an illegitimate son of the enchanter Eliavrés and King Caradoc's wife (and Arthur's niece) Ysaive; "Castle Orgueilleux" which tells of a tournament between the people of this castle and those of King Arthur; "Gawain at the castle of the Grail"; and "Guerrehet", the first known story of Gareth. As this continuation does not return to the adventures of Perceval and as Gawain does not pass the test of the Castle of the Grail, it does not propose an actual end for the text of Chrétien.

In the long version, Gawain opposes the marriage and rides off in anger, reaching the Grail Castle. After further adventures he rejoins Arthur (and the long version rejoins the short) and helps him besiege a rebel's castle. The long version inserts several additional episodes in the thread of the text, especially in the first branch and the third. Some of these episodes revisit the events of The Story of the Grail. Some medievalists have seen in this a desire by the editor of this version to correct the shortcomings of the short version, which leaves out Gawain fulfilling his promise to rescue the damsel of Montesclaire, winning the Sword with the Strange Straps (which once belonged to Judas Maccabeus), and bringing back the Bleeding Lance to the sons of the King of Escavalon.

The First Continuation is notable for its cavalier approach to the narrative agenda set by Chrétien. In particular it includes a seemingly independent romance, which in the long version spans over 6,000 lines: the Livre de Caradoc, starring Arthur's knight Caradoc, which explains how the hero got his nickname "Briefbras", or "Short Arm". All versions of the First Continuation describe Gawain's visit to a Grail castle unlike Chrétien's, a scene that introduces the motif of a broken sword that can only be mended by the hero destined to heal the Fisher King and his lands. Gawain is not this hero and he fails. The final episode recounts the misadventures of Gawain's brother Guerrehet who is humiliated by a dwarf knight before avenging himself and a mysteriously murdered stranger. In the closing scene, he returns to court asleep on a swan boat.

=== Second Continuation ===
Shortly after the First Continuation was completed, no later than 1210, another author added 13,000 lines to the total. This Second Continuation, also known as just the Perceval Continuation, has been sometimes attributed to Wauchier de Denain as well. Making extensive use of motifs and themes drawn from Chrétien and the First Continuation, its story has Perceval returning to the Grail Castle and repairing his sword, but a hairline fissure that remains in the blade symbolizes his still-flawed psyche.

=== Third Continuation ===
Around 1225, the Third Continuation, also known as Manessier's Continuation, added 10,000 verse lines and an ending. The author Manessier wrapped up many of the loose ends from the previous authors, and includes several episodes from other works, including the "Joie de la Cour" adventure from Chrétien's Erec and Enide and Calogrenant's death as told in the Queste del Saint Graal section of the Lancelot-Grail cycle. The tale ends with the Fisher King's death and Perceval's ascension to his throne. After seven peaceful years, Perceval goes off to live as a hermit in the woods, where he dies shortly after. Manessier proposes that he took the Grail, the Lance, and the silver plate with him to Heaven.

=== Fourth Continuation ===
Also around 1225, the Fourth Continuation, or Gerbert's Continuation, added 17,000 verse lines. The author, usually considered to be Gerbert de Montreuil, composed his version independently of Manessier, and probably around the same time. He tried to tie up loose ends left by Chrétien and the other continuations and creates his own additions, notably a complete Tristan episode. Gerbert's Continuation seems not to have enjoyed great popularity; it survives in only two manuscripts, one of which is heavily damaged, as an interpolation between the Second Continuation and the Third Continuation. It is likely Gerbert wrote an ending for the story, but it has been excised from both surviving copies to facilitate its position between the two other continuations.

== Influence ==
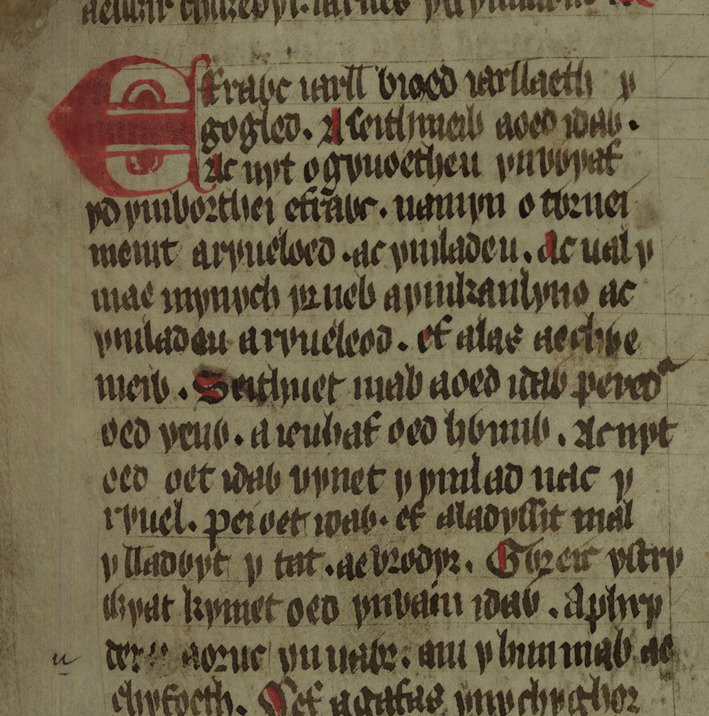
The opening lines of the 14-century Welsh-language Peredur from the Red Book of Hergest (Jesus College, Oxford MS 111)

Though Chrétien did not complete his romance, it had an enormous impact on the literary world of the Middle Ages. Perceval introduced an enthusiastic Europe to the grail and all versions of the story, including those that made it the "Holy Grail", probably derive directly or indirectly from it. The grail in Perceval has the power to heal the Fisher King so it may have been seen as a mystical or holy object by readers.

=== Other related works ===
Wolfram von Eschenbach's Parzival, one of the greatest works of medieval Germany, is based largely on Chrétien's poem. When comparing Wolfram's Parzival to Chrétien's Perceval some scholars not only suggest that the structure is different, but that Chrétien focuses on the religious context of knighthood while Eschenbach focuses on other aspects.

Perlesvaus, also called Li Hauz Livres du Graal (The High History of the Holy Grail), is an Old French Arthurian prose romance dating to the first decade of the 13th century. It purports to be a continuation of Perceval, the Story of the Grail, but it has been called the least canonical Arthurian tale because of its striking differences from other versions. It survives in three manuscripts, two fragments, and two 16th-century printings.

The Elucidation is an anonymous Old French poem of the early 13th century, which was written to serve as a prologue to Chrétien's Perceval. The poem counts 484 lines and cites one Master Blihis as a source for its contents.

Bliocadran, another prologue to Perceval, consists of 800 verses preserved in two 13th-century manuscripts. Here, Perceval's father (who is left unnamed in Chrétien's original) is called Bliocadran.

In the case of the Welsh Peredur son of Efrawg, one of the Three Welsh Romances associated with the Mabinogion, the exact connection to the French work is unclear.

The romance Perchevael found in the Dutch Lancelot Compilation contains only the Gawain episodes from Chrétien's work and from the First Continuation.

Sir Perceval of Galles is an English rewrite that some scholars believe is a comedic interpretation, and which does not mention the grail.

Parcevals saga and its continuation Valvens þáttr (Perceval's saga and The Tale of Gawain) is a thirteenth-century Old Norse chivalric saga adaptation of Chrétien's poem, probably originally composed in Norway but surviving only in Icelandic copies. It is much shorter than the French version, and less interested in the religious elements of the poem and more in Perceval's knightly heroics.

== Bibliography ==
- Three Arthurian Romances: Poems from Medieval France: Caradoc, the Knight With the Sword, the Perilous Graveyard. Translated by Arthur, Ross Gilbert. New York: Everyman's Library. 1996. ISBN 0-460-87577-9.
- The Complete Story of the Grail: Chrétien de Troyes' Perceval and Its Continuations. Translated by Bryant, Nigel. Cambridge: D. S. Brewer. 2015. ISBN 978-1-84384-400-6.
- Chrétien de Troyes (1996). Perceval, the Story of the Grail. Translated by Bryant, Nigel. Cambridge: D. S. Brewer. ISBN 0-85991-224-8.
- Chrétien de Troyes (1988). Arthurian Romances. Translated by Owen, D. D. R. New York: Everyman's Library. ISBN 0-460-87389-X..
- The Mabinogion. Translated by Gantz, Jeffrey. New York: Penguin. 1987. ISBN 0-14-044322-3..
- Lacy, Norris J., ed. (April 1, 1995). Lancelot-Grail: The Old French Arthurian Vulgate and Post-Vulgate in Translation. Vol. 4. New York: Garland. ISBN 0-8153-0748-9..
- Lacy, Norris J., ed. (1991). The New Arthurian Encyclopedia.
