= Treaty of Pont-à-Vendin =

1212 treaty between France and Flanders

The Treaty of Pont-à-Vendin was a treaty signed on 25 February 1212 at Pont-à-Vendin between king Philip II of France and the count (iure uxoris) and countess of Flanders.

== Background ==
After count Baldwin IX of Flanders, who had been able to conclude the for the French disadvantageous peace of Péronne, disappeared under mysterious circumstances when he undertook in his capacity as emperor of the Latin Empire an expedition against the Bulgarians in 1205, king Philip II of France had his eldest daughter Joan brought over to Paris. It was imperative for this ambitious king to have the heiress of Flanders under his control. Therefore she was betrothed to the Portuguese prince Ferdinand (son of Sancho I), in whom he saw an easily manipulated count of Flanders.

== Treaty ==
In January 1212 Joan and Ferdinand tied the knot in Paris. Thereupon the young pair wished to go to the county of Flanders in order to take over the reins of power from Joan's uncle (her father's brother) Philip, margrave of Namur, and temporary regent for the county. During their journey to their new county the couple was taken captive by prince Louis of France, who also took the cities of Saint-Omer and Aire-sur-la-Lys. Philip II let them know that he would release them once they signed a treaty in which they would cede the two captured towns to France. Eventually, on 25 February 1212, they both signed this treaty at Pont-à-Vendin, a Flemish-Artesian border town on the Deûle between Lens and Lille. Philip now thought that with Ferdinand he had appointed a count of Flanders who he could easily manipulate.
