= Ferdinand, Count of Flanders =

Count of Flanders from 1212 to 1233

Ferdinand
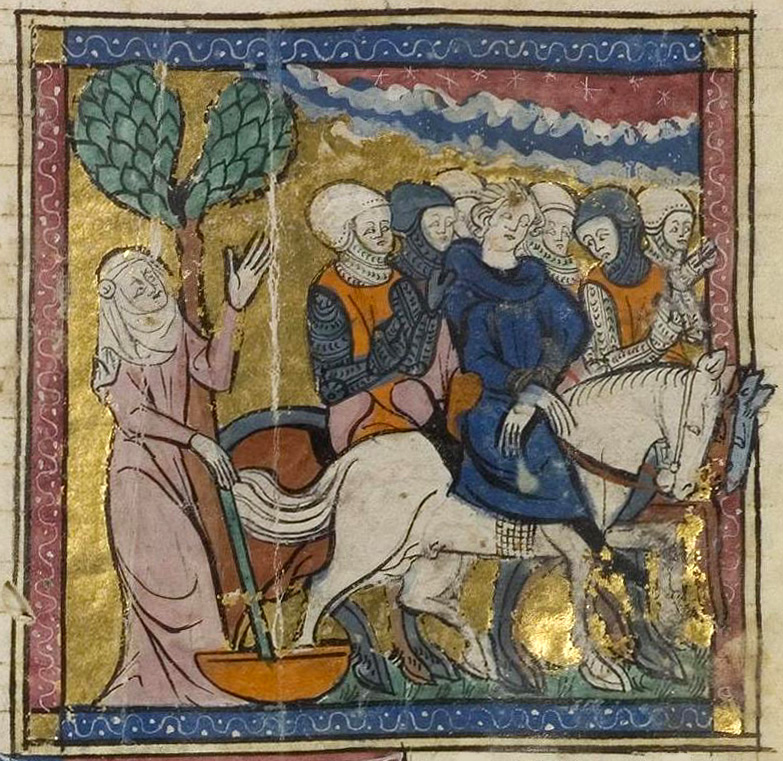

jure uxoris Count of Flanders
- Reign: 1212–1233
- Predecessor: Joan
- Successor: Joan
- Co-ruler: Joan
- Born: 23 February 1188; Coimbra, Kingdom of Portugal
- Died: 27 July 1233 (aged 45); Noyon, France
- Burial: Marquette near Lille, France
- Spouse: Joan, Countess of Flanders
- House: Portuguese House of Burgundy
- Father: Sancho I of Portugal
- Mother: Dulce of Aragon

Ferdinand (Portuguese: Fernando, French and Dutch: Ferrand; 24 March 1188 – 27 July 1233) reigned as jure uxoris Count of Flanders and Hainaut from his marriage to Countess Joan, celebrated in Paris in 1212, until his death. Ferdinand was born in Coimbra, and he was an Infante of Portugal as the fourth son of King Sancho I of Portugal and Dulce of Aragon.

While on their way to Flanders, Ferdinand and Joan were captured by Joan's first cousin Louis, eldest son of Philip II of France and Joan's aunt Isabella. Louis' aim was to acquire his dead mother's dowry, a large piece of Flemish territory including Artois, which Joan's father had taken back by force after Isabella's death.

Released after this concession, Joan and Ferdinand soon joined the old allies of her father, King John of England and Emperor Otto IV, in an alliance against France. They were decisively defeated at Bouvines in July 1214, where Ferdinand was taken prisoner.

Ferdinand was to remain in French hands for the next 12 years, while Joan ruled alone. He was released in 1226, by the French regent, Blanche of Castile, after the accession of her son Louis IX of France.

Ferdinand died in Noyon on 27 July 1233. His and Joan's only child, a daughter named Maria, died childless, and their counties eventually passed to Joan's younger sister, Margaret II.

== Notes ==
Ferdinand, Count of Flanders House of Burgundy Born: 1188 Died: 27 July 1233
Regnal titles
Preceded by Joan as sole ruler	Count of Flanders; 1212–1233; With: Joan	Succeeded by Joan as sole ruler
