= 1213 =

Year

1213 in various calendars
- Gregorian calendar: 1213; MCCXIII
- Ab urbe condita: 1966
- Armenian calendar: 662; ԹՎ ՈԿԲ
- Assyrian calendar: 5963
- Balinese saka calendar: 1134–1135
- Bengali calendar: 619–620
- Berber calendar: 2163
- English Regnal year: 14 Joh. 1 – 15 Joh. 1
- Buddhist calendar: 1757
- Burmese calendar: 575
- Byzantine calendar: 6721–6722
- Chinese calendar: 壬申年 (Water Monkey); 3910 or 3703 — to — 癸酉年 (Water Rooster); 3911 or 3704
- Coptic calendar: 929–930
- Discordian calendar: 2379
- Ethiopian calendar: 1205–1206
- Hebrew calendar: 4973–4974
- Hindu calendars
- Vikram Samvat: 1269–1270
- Shaka Samvat: 1134–1135
- Kali Yuga: 4313–4314
- Holocene calendar: 11213
- Igbo calendar: 213–214
- Iranian calendar: 591–592
- Islamic calendar: 609–610
- Japanese calendar: Kenryaku 3 / Kenpō 1 (建保元年)
- Javanese calendar: 1121–1122
- Julian calendar: 1213; MCCXIII
- Korean calendar: 3546
- Minguo calendar: 699 before ROC 民前699年
- Nanakshahi calendar: −255
- Thai solar calendar: 1755–1756
- Tibetan calendar: ཆུ་ཕོ་སྤྲེ་ལོ་ (male Water-Monkey); 1339 or 958 or 186 — to — ཆུ་མོ་བྱ་ལོ་ (female Water-Bird); 1340 or 959 or 187

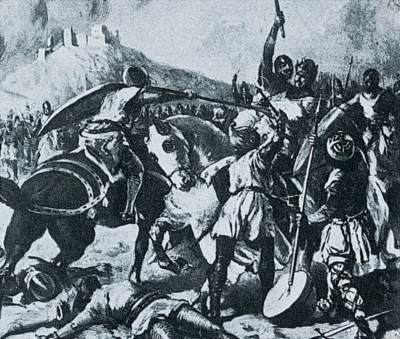
Battle of Muret (1213)

Year 1213 (MCCXIII) was a common year starting on Tuesday of the Julian calendar.

== Events ==
- May 15 – John, King of England submits to Pope Innocent III, who in turn lifts the interdict of 1208 the following year.
- May 30 – Battle of Damme: The English fleet under William Longespée, 3rd Earl of Salisbury, destroys a French fleet off the Belgian port in the first major victory for the fledgling Royal Navy.
- September 12 – Battle of Muret: The Toulousain and Aragonese forces of Raymond VI of Toulouse and Peter II of Aragon are defeated by the Albigensian Crusade, under Simon de Montfort.
- Jin China is overrun by the Mongols under Genghis Khan, who plunder the countryside and cities, until only Beijing remains free, despite two bloody palace coups and a lengthy siege.
- Pope Innocent III issues a charter calling for the Fifth Crusade to recapture Jerusalem.
- Construction of Kilkenny Castle in Ireland is completed.

== Births ==
- March 9 – Hugh IV, Duke of Burgundy, French crusader (d. 1271)
- June 10 – Fakhr-al-Din Iraqi, Persian philosopher and Sufi mystic
- Ibn al-Nafis, polymath (d. 1288)
- Hethum I, King of Armenia, ruler of the Armenian Kingdom of Cilicia (d. 1270)

== Deaths ==
- January 18 – Queen Tamar of Georgia (b. c. 1160)
- April 13 – Guy of Thouars, regent of Brittany
- April 21 – Maria of Montpellier, Lady of Montpellier, Queen of Aragon (b. 1182)
- September 12 – King Peter II of Aragon (killed in battle) (b. 1174)
- September 28 – Gertrude of Merania, queen consort regent of Hungary (murdered) (b. 1185)
- October 10 – Frederick II, Duke of Lorraine
- October 14 – Geoffrey Fitz Peter, 1st Earl of Essex
- Sharafeddin Tusi, Persian mathematician (b. 1135)
