= 1170s =

Decade

The 1170s was a decade of the Julian Calendar which began on January 1, 1170, and ended on December 31, 1179.

== Events ==
=== 1170 ===
==== By place ====
====== Levant ======
- Winter – Egyptian forces, led by Saladin, invade the Kingdom of Jerusalem, and besiege Darum on the Mediterranean coast. Its defenses are weak, and though Saladin has no siege engines with him, the fall seems imminent. King Amalric I withdraws his Templar garrison from Gaza, to assist him in defending Darum. Saladin raises the siege and marches on Gaza, where he captures the lower town (despite the stiff resistance ordered by Lord Miles of Plancy), and massacres the inhabitants. However, the citadel is too strong for Saladin, and he is forced to retreat to Egypt.
- Saladin sends an Egyptian squadron up the Gulf of Aqaba, which captures the Crusader outpost of Aila, at the head of the Gulf.

====== England ======
- June 14 – King Henry II has his 15-year-old son, Henry the Young King, crowned by Roger, Archbishop of York, as junior king and heir to the English throne. The coronation drives Pope Alexander III to allow the exiled Thomas Becket (whose privilege as Archbishop of Canterbury to crown English monarchs has been infringed) to lay an interdict on England as punishment, and this threat forces Henry to negotiate with Becket. Sir William Marshal is appointed tutor-in-arms to Henry the Young King.
- July 22 – Henry II and Thomas Becket meet near Fréteval, France, where they come to an agreement to end their differences. This results in Becket's partial restoration.
- November – Becket controversy: Thomas Becket excommunicates three bishops.
- December 1 – Becket controversy: Henry II sends word that his conflict with Thomas Becket is at an end, and his lands will be restored. Becket returns to England, landing at Sandwich.
- December 29 – Thomas Becket is assassinated by four knights (who believe themselves to be carrying out Henry II's wishes) in Canterbury Cathedral, after his refusal to be arrested for breaking his agreement with Henry II.
- This is the earliest date for the making of cheddar cheese in Somerset (this is according to a pipe roll of Henry II, who purchases 10,240 lb of cheddar at a farthing per pound).

====== Ireland ======
- September 21 – Anglo-Norman invasion of Ireland: Following a siege, combined Anglo-Norman and Irish forces seize the city of Dublin, forcing Ascall mac Ragnaill, last King of Dublin, into exile.

====== Africa ======
- Fes in the Almohad Caliphate (modern Morocco) becomes the largest city of the world, taking the lead from Constantinople, capital of the Byzantine Empire.

====== Asia ======
- June 29 – 1170 Syria earthquake: One of the largest earthquakes to hit Syria. It forms part of a sequence of large earthquakes that propagate southwards along the Dead Sea Transform, starting with the 1138 Aleppo earthquake and continuing with the 1157 Hama, 1170 and 1202 Syria events.
- The palace guards massacre the civil officials at the Korean court of Goryeo and place Myeongjong as new ruler on the throne of the Goryeo dynasty.

==== By topic ====
====== Folklore ======
- The Welsh prince Madoc (son of King Owain ap Gruffudd of Gwynedd) sails to North America, in his ship the Gwennan Gorn, and founds a colony.

====== Religion ======
- Peter Waldo, a French merchant of Lyon, starts the popular religious movement of the "Poor Men of Lyon", or Waldenses.

=== 1171 ===
==== By place ====
====== Byzantine Empire ======
- March 12 – Emperor Manuel I (Komnenos) orders the arrest of all Venetians in his empire, and seizes their ships and goods.
- September – Doge Vitale II Michiel leads a Venetian fleet (120 ships) against the Byzantines, conquering the cities of Trogir and Dubrovnik. But the plague takes a heavy toll among the fleet's crewmen; half the ships have to be burned to keep them from falling into enemy hands. A plague also breaks out in Venice, when the remaining ships return.

====== Europe ======
- Autumn – King Alfonso II (the Chaste) of Aragon conquers the cities of Caspe and Teruel. He strengthens his southern frontier after Almohad forces under Caliph Yusuf I ravage Catalonia.
- The successors of Robert Bordet leave Catalonia for Mallorca, marking the end of the attempts to create a Norman principality in Iberia.

====== Britain ======
- July – King Henry II decides to lead a military expedition to Ireland and summons Richard de Clare (Strongbow) to join forces. In September, Richard travels to England and promises his loyalty to Henry. He is granted Leinster as a fiefdom and is honored with the post of "royal constable in Ireland". The army is assembled at Pembroke – several siege towers are shipped over, should Henry need to assault the Norman-held towns (or others such as Cork and Limerick).

====== Ireland ======
- October 17 – Henry II invades Ireland and lands with a large army of at least 500 mounted knights, and 4,000 men and archers at Waterford. Henry commandeers merchant ships as part of his invasion. He claims the ports of Dublin, Waterford, and Wexford, and promises the Irish chieftains protection if they will acknowledge him as their overlord. Henry is recognized as "Lord of Ireland", traders are invited to Dublin where an English colony is set up.
- Ascall mac Ragnaill (or Torcaill), last Norse–Gaelic king of Dublin, is captured while trying to retake Dublin from the English forces under Richard de Clare, perhaps in company with Sweyn Asleifsson, and is beheaded. Before the end of the year, Richard relinquishes possession of the city to Henry II, who converts it into an English royal town.

====== Levant ======
- March 10 – King Amalric I of Jerusalem departs with a large staff for Constantinople. At Callipolis he is met by his father-in-law, John Doukas Komnenos, military governor (doux) of Cyprus. Amalric enters the Byzantine capital and is welcomed by Manuel I. In June, a treaty is signed, Amalric recognizes Manuel's suzerainty over Jerusalem.

====== Egypt ======
- September 13 – Caliph Al-Adid dies of natural causes (or poisoning) after a 11-year reign. Saladin overthrows the Fatimid Caliphate, and takes over as governor (atabeg) of Egypt – ruling in the name of Emir Nur al-Din.
- September 25 – Saladin leads an Egyptian army to take part in a joint attack on the Crusader castles Kerak and Montréal, south of the Dead Sea. In November, Saladin withdraws his forces to Cairo to suppress a coup.

====== Asia ======
- Yesugei (Baghatur), Mongol chieftain, arranges a marriage between his 9-year-old son Temujin (Genghis Khan) and the daughter of the chief of a nearby clan, Börte. He is poisoned by the Tatars while sharing a meal during the wedding.

=== 1172 ===
==== By place ====
====== Europe ======
- April–May – Béla III returns to Hungary – where he is acclaimed king by the Hungarian nobility, after the death (possibly from poison) of his elder brother Stephen III, on March 4.
- May 28 – Doge Vitale II Michiel, accused at a General Assembly at the Ducal Palace, for the destruction of the Venetian fleet, is stabbed to death by an angry mob at Venice.
- Summer – The 14-year-old Richard (later Richard I of England) is formally recognized as duke of Aquitaine. The ceremony takes place at the church of St. Hilary in Poitiers.
- A Muslim rebellion is quelled at Prades in Catalonia; this event marks the end of the pacification of the lands recently conquered by Count Ramon Berenguer IV ("the Saint").

====== Britain ======
- April 17 – Henry II receives homage from the Irish princes who include Domnall Mór Ua Briain, king of Munster. He grants Hugh de Lacy the lordship of Meath (or Mide) for providing the services of 50 knights.
- King Henry II of England and Humbert III, Count of Savoy ("the Blessed") agree to the marriage of their respective heirs, John and Alicia. The alliance never occurs because Henry's elder heir, Henry the Young King, becomes jealous over the castles in the realm which Henry has promised to the couple. He stages a rebellion which will take Henry two years to put down. By that time, Alicia will have died.

====== Egypt ======
- Summer – Emir Nur al-Din begins a two year war against the Danishmendids. He creates a buffer zone between the Syrian realm and Egypt. Meanwhile, he releases Count Raymond of Tripoli for the sum of 80,000 dinars.
- Winter – The Nubians are engaged in a series of skirmishes along the frontier in Upper Egypt. A force of Kurdish troops under Turan-Shah, a brother of Saladin, attack the Nubians. He installs a garrison in Qasr Ibrim.

==== By topic ====
====== Religion ======
- May 21 – Henry II of England does penance at Avranches Cathedral for the murder of Thomas Becket.
- September 27–28 – Compromise of Avranches: Alberto di Morra is sent by Pope Alexander III to the Council of Avranches to investigate the Becket controversy. Henry II is absolved of censures for Becket's murder in view of his penance and swears to go on a crusade. He revokes two controversial clauses of the Constitutions of Clarendon and is reconciled with the papacy.
- c. October – The Synod of Cashel in Ireland brings Celtic Christianity more into alignment with the Latin Church (the modern Catholic Church).
- According to the annals of the Worcester Priory in England, "nothing memorable" happens in this year.

=== 1173 ===
==== By place ====
====== Europe ======
- January 5 – Bolesław IV (the Curly), High Duke of Poland, dies after a 27-year reign. He is succeeded by his half-brother Mieszko III (the Old), and as duke of Sandomierz in Lesser Poland by Casimir II (the Just).
- King Canute I (Knut Eriksson) extends his rule after the death of co-ruler Kol – which includes also Östergötland. He becomes the unopposed sole-ruler of Sweden. Canute is supported by Earl Birger Brosa.
- Abu Yaqub Yusuf, caliph of the Almohad Caliphate, re-populates the western Andalusian city of Beja. But it is rapidly abandoned, a sign of the quick demographic weakening of the Muslims in the peninsula.

====== England ======
- Spring – Henry the Young King withdraws to the French court, marking the beginning of the Revolt of 1173–74, in which former Queen Eleanor of Aquitaine and her sons rebel against her ex-husband King Henry II.
- October 17 – Battle of Fornham: Rebel forces are defeated while fording the River Lark. Flemish mercenaries are driven into the nearby swamps by the English royalists under Lord Richard de Luci (or Lucy).

====== Egypt ======
- Summer – Saladin leads an expeditionary army against the Bedouin tribes in Oultrejordain to secure a route between Egypt and Syria. He raids the region at Kerak Castle.
- Pro-Fatimid rising in Upper Egypt led by Kanz al-Dawla, governor of Aswan, is crushed by Saladin's brother Al-Adil.

====== China ======
- The Qiandao era ends and the Chunxi era begins during the reign of Emperor Xiao Zong of the Song dynasty.

South India

- Sinhalese king Parakramabahu the Great gains a decisive victory by invading the Chola Empire as an ally of the Pandyas, capturing Tondi and Pasi regions.

==== By topic ====
====== Art and Leisure ======
- August 8 – The construction of a campanile, which will become the Leaning Tower of Pisa, begins.
- Algebraic chess notation is first recorded.

====== Agriculture ======
- King Béla III invites Cistercian and Premonstratensian monks to Hungary. They introduce advanced agricultural methods in the realm (approximate date).

====== Religion ======
- February 21 – Thomas Becket is canonized by Pope Alexander III. His tomb in Canterbury Cathedral becomes a shrine and a popular pilgrimage destination.
- Peter Waldo, French spiritual leader, is converted to Christianity and founds the Waldensians.
- The Great Mosque of al-Nuri in Mosul is completed (approximate date).

=== 1174 ===
==== By place ====
====== Britain ======
- July 13 – Battle of Alnwick: King William I (the Lion), supported by Flemish mercenaries, invades England, to help fight in the baronial rebellion against King Henry II. William attacks Prudhoe Castle in Northumberland, but is unable to capture it. He is captured by Lord Ranulf de Glanvill, and brought back to Newcastle. Henry occupies a part of Scotland, with its five strongest castles: Roxburgh, Berwick, Jedburgh, Edinburgh and Stirling.
- September 5 – Canterbury Cathedral is severely damaged in a fire.
- September 30 – The Revolt of 1173–1174: After a year and a half of rebellion, Henry II achieves peace agreements with his sons Henry the Young King, Richard, Geoffrey and John at Montlouis, on the basis of the pre-war status quo. Before he returns to Normandy, Henry orders the rebel castles in England and Aquitaine to be destroyed.
- October – Battle of Thurles: Gaelic-Irish forces under King Domnall Mór Ua Briain defeat an Anglo-Norman invasion at Thurles in Ireland. The English expedition led by Earl Richard de Clare (Strongbow) is surprised while encamped in the area of Lognafola and is forced to retreat to Waterford.
- December 8 – The Treaty of Falaise: Captured by the English, William I is forced to sign a peace agreement. The treaty makes Scotland a feudal possession of England, William and his nobles swear allegiance to Henry II. He must hand over several castles to Henry in return for his freedom.

====== Europe ======
- Summer – French forces under King Louis VII, supported by Henry the Young King and Philip of Alsace, encircle Rouen. The city holds out against the war engines long enough for Henry II to arrive in the middle of August to stage a rescue. The besiegers are fearful that Henry will invade France and the siege is lifted.
- October 29 – Emperor Frederick I (Barbarossa), on his fifth Italian campaign, begins the siege of Alessandria in northern Italy. He is opposed by the Lombard League (now joined by Venice, Sicily and Constantinople).

====== Levant ======
- May 15 – Nur al-Din, Seljuk ruler (atabeg) of Syria, dies at Damascus after a 28-year reign. He is succeeded by his 11-year-old son As-Salih Ismail al-Malik. Meanwhile, Saladin declares himself his regent and vassal.
- July 11 – King Amalric I dies of dysentery after an 11-year reign. He is succeeded by his 13-year-old son Baldwin IV (the Leper), who becomes ruler of Jerusalem. Count Raymond of Tripoli is appointed as his regent.
- November 23 – Saladin arrives at Damascus and spends the night at his father's old house, until the gates of the Citadel of Damascus are opened to him, after a brief siege by his brother Tughtakin ibn Ayyub.

====== Egypt ======
- February – Saladin's brother Turan-Shah sails with an army and supporting fleet to conquer the Hejaz and Yemen.
- March 31 – A conspiracy against Saladin, aiming to restore the Fatimid Caliphate, is revealed in Cairo, involving senior figures of the former Fatimid regime and the poet Umara al-Yamani. Modern historians doubt the extent and danger of the conspiracy reported in official sources, but its ringleaders will be publicly executed over the following weeks.
- July 25 – The Sicilian fleet (some 250 ships) under Tancred, Count of Syracuse, launches a failed attack against Alexandria. But he is deprived of support and forced to sail away after a seven-day blockade on August 1.

====== Asia ======
- Kilij Arslan II, Seljuk ruler of the Sultanate of Rum, rounds off his conquest of the Danishmend Turks in Eastern Anatolia. He allies with the Zangid rulers against Mosul.

==== By topic ====
====== Religion ======
- April 7 – Pope Alexander III consecrates Richard of Dover as archbishop of Canterbury at Anagni. Richard returns to England bearing his pallium which he has received directly from the pope.
- July 7 – Henry II does penance at Canterbury for the murder of Thomas Becket (see 1170), even though indirect. He is whipped by the monks as punishment.

=== 1175 ===
==== By place ====
====== Britain ======
- King Henry II begins living openly with his mistress Rosamund Clifford, raising suspicions about their relationship and alienating Henry's wife, Queen Eleanor of Aquitaine.
- Eleanor of Aquitaine is held under house arrest at Old Sarum Castle in Wiltshire. She is kept in comfort there – fine clothes for her are dispatched regularly from London.
- Treaty of Windsor: High King Ruaidrí Ua Conchobair relinquishes his title and agrees to submit to Henry II as vassal of Connacht in Ireland.
- Winter – The Massacre of Abergavenny ends with several Welsh noblemen dead, at the orders of Lord William de Braose.

====== Europe ======
- Under the admirals of the clan Banu Mardanish, an Almohad fleet suffers a large defeat at the hand of the Portuguese, as they are trying to re-conquer Lisbon.
- Vordingborg Castle is completed by King Valdemar I of Denmark as a defensive fortress.
- The University of Modena and Reggio Emilia in Italy is founded.

====== Levant ======
- May 22 – A group of Isma'ili Assassins gains access into Saladin's camp and attempts to kill him during the siege of Aleppo. But his bodyguard saves his life, the others are slain while trying to escape.

====== Asia ======
- The Chinese court establishes several government-paper money factories in the cities of Chengdu, Hangzhou and Huizhou. In Hangzhou alone a daily workforce of more than 1,000 men is employed.
- The Namayan Kingdom formed by a confederation of barangays, reaches its peak on Luzon (modern Philippines).

==== By topic ====
====== Religion ======
- The High Academy of the Bosnian Church in Moštre (modern-day Visoko), is first mentioned in the Vatican archives.
- Count Raymond of Tripoli appoints William II as chancellor of Jerusalem and is elected as archbishop of Tyre.

=== 1176 ===
==== By place ====
====== Byzantine Empire ======
- Summer – Emperor Manuel I (Komnenos) assembles a Byzantine expeditionary force, and marches towards Iconium, the Seljuk capital. Meanwhile, hordes of Seljuk Turks destroy crops and poison water supplies, to make Manuel's march more difficult, and harass the Byzantine army, in order to force it into the Meander Valley. Kilij Arslan II, ruler of the Sultanate of Rum, hears of the expedition, and sends envoys to ask for peace.
- September 17 – Battle of Myriokephalon: The Seljuk Turks defeat the Byzantine forces led by Manuel I, who are ambushed when moving through a narrow mountain pass near Lake Beyşehir. The Byzantines are dispersed and surrounded. They suffer heavy casualties and their siege equipment is destroyed. Manuel flees in panic and is forced to sign a peace treaty with Kilij Arslan II.

====== Europe ======
- May 29 – Battle of Legnano: The Imperial army (some 5,500 men) led by Emperor Frederick I (Barbarossa) is defeated by forces of the Lombard League, leading to the pactum Anagnium (the Agreement of Anagni).

====== Britain ======
- Spring – Assize of Northampton: King Henry II establishes the rules for the administration of criminal justice that he has set out in 1166 at Clarendon.
- Winter – An international bardic festival at Cardigan Castle in Wales. The first recorded eisteddfod.

====== Egypt ======
- Al-Adil I, Ayyubid governor of Egypt, suppresses a revolt by the Christian Copts in the city of Qift, hanging nearly 3,000 of them on the trees near the city.

====== Levant ======
- Spring – Saladin defeats the Zangid forces before Damascus and marries Nur al-Din's widow Asimat. On June 24 he accepts a truce and is recognized as the sovereign over Syria.
- Summer – Saladin ends his siege of the Ismaili ("Assassins") fortress of Masyaf, which is commanded by Rashid al-Din Sinan.
- Autumn – William of Montferrat (Longsword) marries the 16-year-old Princess Sibylla, sister of King Baldwin IV (the Leper).
- Raynald of Châtillon is released and ransomed from prison in Aleppo, together with Joscelin III, the titular count of Edessa.

====== Asia ======
- Unkei, a Japanese sculptor, completes his Dainichi Nyorai (Enjō-ji) statue, now a National Treasure of Japan.

==== By topic ====
====== Religion ======
- Autumn – Frederick I makes peace with Pope Alexander III and recognizes his legitimacy as pope of the Catholic Church.
- Sens Cathedral in Burgundy installs an horologe, presumed to be an early form of clock.
- The Carthusians are approved as a religious order.

=== 1177 ===
==== January–December ====
- January – Eystein Meyla, leader of the Birkebeiner in Norway, is killed. Sverre Sigurdson (Later, King Sverre I, of Norway) becomes the new leader.
- January 13 – Leopold V becomes Duke of Austria.
- March – Treaty of Venice: Frederick I Barbarossa acknowledges Alexander III as Pope, after a diplomatic mediation by Venetian doge Sebastiano Ziani.
- March 16 – The Spanish Award is signed and witnessed by, among others, Robert III de Stuteville and John of Greenford
- August 1 – The Holy Roman Empire renounces any claims on the territory of Rome.
- September 27 – Pope Alexander III sends a letter to Prester John, believing he is real.
- November 25 – Battle of Montgisard: Baldwin IV of Jerusalem and Raynald of Chatillon defeat Saladin.

==== Date unknown ====
- During the third year of the Angen era in Japan, a fire devastates Kyoto.
- During the winter, the Estonians attack Pskov.
- Casimir II overthrows his brother Mieszko III the Old, to become High Duke of Poland.
- The Cham sack the Khmer capital of Angkor. The date is disputed.
- Moscow is burned down by Gleb I, prince of Ryazan, and its inhabitants are killed.
- A civil war breaks out in the Republic of Florence, between the Uberti Family and their consular opponent.
- Puigcerdà is founded by Alfonso II of Aragon.
- Byland Abbey is established on its final site in Yorkshire, England, by the Cistercians.
- Abbas Benedictus becomes abbot of Peterborough in England.
- Roger de Moulins becomes Grand Master of the Knights Hospitaller.
- possible date – Richard FitzNeal begins to write his treatise Dialogus de Scaccario ("Dialogue concerning the Exchequer") in England.

=== 1178 ===
==== By place ====
====== Europe ======
- June 30 – Emperor Frederick I (Barbarossa) is crowned King of Burgundy at Arles. He will repeat the ceremony in 1186. Returning to Germany, he begins proceedings against Henry III (the Lion), duke of Saxony, who has been charged by Saxon noblemen with breaking the king's peace.
- July 17 – Saracen pirates, from the Balearic Islands, raid the Cistercian monastery of Saint Honorat on the Lérins Islands, and the city of Toulon, killing an estimated 300 and taking captives. The surviving captives are freed from the Balearic Islands in 1185.
- King George III defeats a nobles' revolt and proclaims his 18-year-old daughter Tamar (the Great) as co-ruler of Georgia.
- Orio Mastropiero is elected by the Council of Forty as doge of Venice, following the retirement of Sebastiano Ziani.
- Portuguese forces under King Afonso I (the Conqueror) capture the city of Beja from the Almohads.

====== Asia ======
- August 17 – A battle occurs as a Latin force raids the vicinity of Hama, Syria.

==== By topic ====
====== Art and Science ======
- The Leaning Tower of Pisa begins to lean, as the third level is completed (approximate date).

====== Religion ======
- Summer – Antipope Callixtus III submits to Pope Alexander III after having reigned for 10 years with support from Frederick I.
- June 18 – Five monks from Canterbury see what is possibly the Giordano Bruno crater being formed.

=== 1179 ===
==== By place ====
====== Levant ======
- April 10 – A Crusader army, led by King Baldwin IV of Jerusalem ("the Leper"), is ambushed by Muslim forces in a narrow valley in the forest of Banyas. Baldwin is only able to extricate his forces owing to the heroism of Humphrey II, lord of Toron, who holds up the Muslims with his bodyguard till Baldwin and his army escape. Humphrey suffers mortal wounds and dies on April 22. He is succeeded by his 13-year-old grandson Humphrey IV.
- June 10 – Battle of Marj Ayyun: A Crusader army (some 10,000 men) led by Baldwin IV is defeated by Muslim forces under Saladin near the Litani River (modern Lebanon). The Knights Templar join the battle, but they are driven back in confusion. Baldwin narrowly escapes being captured in the route. Amongst Saladin's prisoners are Odo de St. Amand, Grand Master of the Templars, and Lord Baldwin of Ibelin.
- August 30 – Siege of Jacob's Ford: Muslim forces led by Saladin conquer and destroy the unfinished Castle of Chastellet at Jacob's Ford, killing 80 knights and taking 700 civilians captive.

====== Europe ======
- June 18 – Battle of Kalvskinnet: Norwegian forces led by King Sverre Sigurdsson defeat and kill Earl Erling Skakke, outside Nidaros in Norway. The battle changes the tide of the civil wars.
- June 24 – Henry the Lion, duke of Saxony, is put under the ban of the empire when he refuses to appear before Emperor Frederick I (Barbarossa) to answer charges of misgovernment.
- Summer – Afonso I (the Conqueror) is recognized as King of Portugal by Pope Alexander III – bringing Portugal the protection of the Catholic Church against the Leonese monarchy.
- Mieszko III (the Old), duke of Poland, travels to Germany and ask Frederick I to offer help in his restoration of the Polish throne. But Frederick demands a payment of 10,000 silver.
- November 1 – The 14-year-old Philip II is crowned at Rheims by Archbishop William of the White Hands. He becomes joint ruler of France, together with his father King Louis VII.
- King William I (the Lion) establishes two castles at the Beauly Firth and the Cromarty Firth in northern Scotland. On his return, the city of Aberdeen is chartered by Wiliam.

====== England ======
- Summer – Richard de Luci (or Lucy), High Sheriff of Essex, resigns his judicial office. He enters Lesnes Abbey (near London) that he founded in Kent, as penance for his part in the events leading to the murder of Thomas Becket (see 1170). Richard dies there on July 14.

====== Africa ======
- September 17 – A large offensive, by the Almohad army led by Yusuf I in southern Portugal, aims at the reconquest of the Alentejo. Further north, an Almohad fleet sails to attack Lisbon, but is repelled by the Portuguese, near the Cape Espichel. The Portuguese fleet later manages to enter in the harbour of Ceuta, and destroy a number of Muslim ships. It is the beginning of a four-year naval conflict between the Almohads and Portuguese.

====== Asia ======
- Taira no Kiyomori, Japanese military leader, confines the former Emperor Go-Shirakawa to his quarters after discovering that he has tried to confiscate the estates of Kiyomori's deceased children.

====== Mesoamerica ======
- The Maya city Chichen Itza is sacked and burned by Hunac Ceel, ruler of Mayapan (approximate date).

==== By topic ====
====== Religion ======
- March – Third Council of the Lateran: The Council condemns Waldensians and Cathars as heretics. It further institutes a reformation of clerical life and regulates that in order to prevent future schisms, the pope must receive 2/3 of the cardinals' votes to be elected.
- September 17 – Hildegard of Bingen, German abbess and polymath, dies at Rupertsberg. Having founded two monasteries, she has also written theological, botanical, and medicinal texts.
- Westminster School is founded by Benedictine monks of Westminster Abbey (by papal command) in England.
- A synod of thirty-three Armenian bishops in Hromkla discusses the conditions for union with the Byzantine Church and sends a profession of faith to emperor Manuel I Komnenos who dies before receiving it.
- The Drigung Kagyu school of Kagyu Buddhism is founded (approximate date).

== Significant people ==
- Saladin (c.1137 - 1193)
- Al-Mustadi (1142 - 1182)
- Pope Alexander III (c. 1100 - 1181)
- Henry II, King of England (1133 - 1189)
- Baldwin IV, King of Jerusalem (1161 - 1185)
- Eleanor of Aquitaine (c.1124 - 1204)

== Births ==
1170

- April 5 – Isabella of Hainault, queen of France (d. 1190)
- May 9 – Valdemar II (the Conqueror), king of Denmark (d. 1241)
- August 8 – Dominic, founder of the Dominican Order (d. 1221)
- October 8 – Vladimir III Igorevich, Kievan prince (d. 1211)
- Agnes I, countess of Nevers, Auxerre and Tonnerre (d. 1192)
- Al-Dakhwar, Ayyubid physician and medical officer (d. 1230)
- Amaury I, French nobleman (House of Craon) (d. 1226)
- Asukai Masatsune, Japanese waka poet and writer (d. 1221)
- Azzo VI of Este (or Azzolino), Italian nobleman (d. 1212)
- Bahauddin Zakariya, Ghurid scholar and poet (d. 1262)
- Erard of Brienne-Ramerupt, French nobleman (d. 1246)
- Ermengarde de Beaumont, queen of Scotland (d. 1233)
- Eustace the Monk, French mercenary and pirate (d. 1217)
- Franca Visalta, Italian nun and abbess (approximate date)
- Gebhard I of Plain (or Pleyen), German bishop (d. 1232)
- Giovanni Colonna (the Younger), Italian cardinal (d. 1245)
- Henry Borwin II (or Burwy), German nobleman (d. 1226)
- Hubert de Burgh, English Chief Justiciar (approximate date)
- John of Brienne (or John I), king of Jerusalem (d. 1237)
- Leonardo of Pisa, Italian mathematician (approximate date)
- Lope Díaz II, Castilian nobleman (House of Haro) (d. 1236)
- Maelgwn ap Rhys, Welsh prince of Deheubarth (d. 1230)
- Matilda of Boulogne, duchess of Brabant (approximate date)
- Minamoto no Ienaga, Japanese nobleman and poet (d. 1234)
- Muqali (or Mukhhulai), Mongol military leader (d. 1223)
- Pons d'Ortaffa, Catalan nobleman and troubadour (d. 1246)
- Ranulf de Blondeville, English nobleman and regent (d. 1232)
- Richard de Percy, English nobleman (approximate date)
- Rodrigo Jiménez de Rada, Navarrese bishop (d. 1247)
- Roger de Lacy, English nobleman and crusader (d. 1211)
- Saer de Quincy, 1st Earl of Winchester (approximate date)
- Sophia of Wittelsbach, German noblewoman (d. 1238)
- Theoderich II von Wied, German archbishop (d. 1242)
- Walther von der Vogelweide, German lyrical poet (d. 1230)
- Xiang Zong, Chinese emperor of Western Xia (d. 1211)
- Zhao Rukuo, Chinese historian and politician (d. 1231)

1171

- August 15 – Alfonso IX, king of León and Galicia (d. 1230)
- Agnes of France (or Anna), Byzantine empress (d. 1220)
- Al-Aziz Uthman, Egyptian ruler and son of Saladin (d. 1198)
- Matilda of Chester (or Maud), English noblewoman (d. 1233)
- Minamoto no Michitomo, Japanese nobleman (d. 1227)
- Muhammad Aufi, Persian historian and philologist (d. 1242)
- Saionji Kintsune, Japanese nobleman and poet (d. 1244)
- Stephen de Segrave, English Chief Justiciar (d. 1241)

1172

- July 12 – Matsudono Moroie, Japanese nobleman (d. 1238)
- Al-Qifti, Egyptian historian and biographer (d. 1248)
- Az-Zahir Ghazi, Ayyubid ruler of Aleppo (d. 1216)
- Baldwin I, emperor of the Latin Empire (d. 1205)
- Conrad II, duke of Swabia and Rothenburg (d. 1196)
- Isabel de Clare, countess of Pembroke (d. 1220)
- Isabella I, queen and regent of Jerusalem (d. 1205)
- Louis I of Blois, French nobleman (d. 1205)

1173

- May 21 – Shinran, founder of Shin Buddhism (d. 1263)
- October 31 – Kujō Ninshi, Japanese empress (d. 1239)
- December 23 – Louis I, duke of Bavaria (d. 1231)
- Diya al-Din al-Maqdisi, Arab Sunni scholar (d. 1245)
- Frederick I, count of Berg-Altena (approximate date)
- Isabella, countess of Gloucester (approximate date)
- Kamal al-Din Isfahani, Persian poet and writer (d. 1237)
- Kolbeinn Tumason, Icelandic chieftain (d. 1208)
- Llywelyn the Great, king of Gwynedd (d. 1240)
- Louis IV (the Young), French nobleman (d. 1226)
- Rostislav II, Grand Prince of Kiev (d. 1214)
- Tankei, Japanese Buddhist sculptor (d. 1256)
- Walter Devereux, Norman nobleman (d. 1197)

1174

- Edmund of Abingdon, English archbishop (d. 1240)
- Emeric, king of Hungary and Croatia (d. 1204)
- Gerard of Villamagna, Italian hermit (d. 1242)
- Hedwig of Silesia, duchess of Greater Poland (d. 1243)
- Ingeborg of Denmark, queen of France (d. 1237)
- Liu Songnian, Chinese landscape painter (d. 1224)
- Robert de Gresle, English landowner (d. 1230)
- Sava (the Enlightener), Serbian prince (d. 1236)

1175

- February 4 – Nadaungmya, king of Burma (d. 1235)
- Al-Zahir, caliph of the Abbasid Caliphate (d. 1226)
- Emo of Friesland, Frisian scholar and abbot (d. 1237)
- Frederick I, duke of Austria (d. 1198)
- Henry Audley, English nobleman (d. 1246)
- Herman II, German nobleman (House of Lippe) (d. 1229)
- Hōjō Tokifusa, Japanese nobleman and monk (d. 1240)
- Margaret of Hungary, Byzantine empress (d. 1223)
- Michael Scot, Scottish mathematician and scholar (d. 1232)
- Otto IV, Holy Roman Emperor (House of Welf) (d. 1218)
- Philip I, margrave of Namur (d. 1212)
- Raymond of Penyafort, Spanish Dominican friar (d. 1275)
- Robert Grosseteste, English statesman (d. 1253)
- Roger III, king of Sicily (House of Hauteville) (d. 1193)
- Śārṅgadeva, Indian musicologist and writer (d. 1247)
- Subutai, Mongol general and strategist (d. 1248)
- Theodore I, emperor of Nicaea (d. 1221)
- Yolanda, empress of the Latin Empire (d. 1219)

1176

- October 15 – Leopold VI, German nobleman (d. 1230)
- Agnes of Hohenstaufen, German noblewoman (d. 1204)
- Al-Mu'azzam Isa, Ayyubid ruler of Damascus (d. 1227)
- Anna Komnene Angelina, Nicene empress (d. 1212)
- Fujiwara no Nobuzane, Japanese painter (d. 1265)
- Hachijō-in Takakura, Japanese waka poet (d. 1248)
- Henry de Bohun, 1st Earl of Hereford (d. 1220)
- Hugh de Lacy, 1st Earl of Ulster (approximate date)
- Maud le Vavasour, English noblewoman (d. 1225)
- Theresa of Portugal, queen of León (d. 1250)
- William Longespée, 3rd Earl of Salisbury (d. 1226)

1177

- February/March – Philip of Swabia, rival of Otto IV, Holy Roman Emperor (d. 1208)
- August – Baldwin V, King of Jerusalem (d. 1186)
- Marie of Oignies, French beguin (d. 1213)
- Prithviraj Chauhan, Indian ruler of Ajmer (d. 1192)
- Sylvester Gozzolini, Italian founder of the Sylvestrines (d. 1267)

1178

- October 27 – Zhen Dexiu, Chinese politician (d. 1235)
- December 22 – Antoku, emperor of Japan (d. 1185)
- Alam al-Din al-Hanafi, Ayyubid mathematician (d. 1251)
- Al-Faqih al-Muqaddam, Arab religious leader (d. 1232)
- Armand de Périgord, French Grand Master (d. 1244)
- Hugh I, Sardinian ruler (Judge of Arborea) (d. 1211)
- Matteo Rosso Orsini, Italian politician (d. 1246)
- Peter II (the Catholic), king of Aragon (d. 1213)
- Roland of Cremona, French theologian (d. 1259)
- Thomas I (or Tommaso), count of Savoy (d. 1233)
- Wei Liaoweng, Chinese politician and philosopher (d. 1237)
- Wuzhun Shifan, Chinese calligrapher and painter (d. 1249)

1179

- April 4 – Fariduddin Ganjshakar, Indian preacher (d. 1266)
- May 13 – Theobald III, count of Champagne (d. 1201)
- May 17 – Ogasawara Nagatsune, Japanese warrior (d. 1247)
- Constance of Aragon, Holy Roman Empress (d. 1222)
- Donatus of Ripacandida, Italian monk and saint (d. 1198)
- John of Ibelin, the Old Lord of Beirut, constable (d. 1236)
- Konoe Iezane, Japanese nobleman and monk (d. 1243)
- Shimazu Tadahisa, Japanese warlord (d. 1227)
- Serapion of Algiers, English priest and martyr (d. 1240)
- Snorri Sturluson, Icelandic historian and poet (d. 1241)
- William IV, Count of Ponthieu ("Talvas"), Norman nobleman (d. 1221)
- Yaqut al-Hamawi, Arab geographer and writer (d. 1229)

== Deaths ==
1170

- January 22 – Wang Chongyang, Chinese philosopher (b. 1113)
- April 23 – Minamoto no Tametomo, Japanese samurai (b. 1139)
- May 6 – Lope Díaz I de Haro, Castilian nobleman (b. 1105)
- May 21 – Godric of Finchale, English hermit and merchant
- July 25 – Reginald II of Bar (or Renaud), French nobleman
- August 19 – Mstislav II Izyaslavich, Grand Prince of Kiev
- September 6 – Qutb al-Din Mawdud, Zangid ruler of Mosul
- September 14 – Heilika of Lengenfeld, German countess
- November 18 – Albert I (the Bear), German nobleman
- November 20 – Gerung of Meissen, German bishop
- December 20 – Al-Mustanjid, Abbasid caliph (b. 1124)
- December 29 – Thomas Becket, English archbishop
- Abu Hamid al-Gharnati, Andalusian traveller (b. 1080)
- Aindileas Ua Chlúmháin, Irish chief poet and writer
- Christina Björnsdotter, queen of Sweden (b. 1120)
- Eliezer ben Nathan, German rabbi and poet (b. 1090)
- Gerlach of Valkenburg, Dutch hermit (b. 1100)
- Gonçalo Mendes da Maia, Portuguese knight
- Hywel ab Owain Gwynedd, king of Gwynedd
- Ibn Zafar al-Siqilli, Arab-Sicilian politician (b. 1104)
- Joseph Kimhi, Spanish rabbi and poet (b. 1105)
- Owain ap Gruffudd, king of Gwynedd (b. 1100)
- Robert Fitzharding, English nobleman (b. 1095)
- Ruben II (or Roupen), Armenian prince (b. 1165)
- Zishou Miaozong, Chinese Zen master (b. 1095)

1171

- February 20 – Conan IV (the Young), duke of Brittany (b. 1138)
- March 29 – Achard of Saint Victor, Norman bishop (b. 1100)
- April 3 – Philip of Milly, French nobleman and knight (b. 1120)
- May 1 – Diarmaid mac Murchadha, king of Leinster (b. 1110)
- June 9 – Jacob ben Meir Tam, French Jewish rabbi (b. 1100)
- August 8 – Henry of Blois, bishop of Winchester (b. 1096)
- September 13 – Al-Adid, last Fatimid caliph (b. 1151)
- November 8 – Baldwin IV, count of Hainaut (b. 1108)
- December 27 – Petrus Ua Mórda, bishop of Clonfert
- Abu'l-Hasan al-Hasan ibn Ali, Zirid ruler (b. 1109)
- Ascall mac Ragnaill (or Torcaill), king of Dublin
- Gleb of Kiev (Yuryevich), Grand Prince of Kiev
- Iorwerth Goch ap Maredudd, Welsh nobleman
- Narathu, ruler of the Pagan Kingdom (b. 1118)
- Vladimir III Mstislavich, Grand Prince of Kiev
- William de Courcy, Norman nobleman and knight
- Yesugei (Baghatur), Mongol chieftain (b. 1134)

1172

- March 4 – Stephen III, king of Hungary (b. 1147)
- March 7 – Il-Arslan, Khwarezm ruler (shah)
- May 28 – Vitale II Michiel, doge of Venice
- October 14 – Ludwig II, German nobleman (b. 1128)
- December 23 – Ugo Ventimiglia, Italian cardinal
- Douce II, countess of Provence (b. 1162)
- Cadwaladr ap Gruffydd, king of Gwynedd
- Hugh of Fouilloy, French prior and writer
- Ibn Qalaqis, Fatimid poet and writer (b. 1137)
- Robert FitzEdith, English nobleman (b. 1093)
- Robert FitzRanulph, English high sheriff
- William III, French nobleman (b. 1093)
- William VII, French nobleman b. 1131)
- Henry, Prince of Capua, Sicilian prince (b. 1160)

1173

- January 5 – Bolesław IV (the Curly), duke of Poland
- February 10 – Muiredach Ua Cobthaig, Irish bishop
- March 10 – Richard of Saint Victor, Scottish theologian
- May 25 – Euphrosyne of Polotsk, Belarusian granddaughter
- August 9 – Najm ad-Din Ayyub, father of Saladin
- August 13 – Nerses IV, Catholicos of Armenia (b. 1102)
- October 15 – Petronilla, queen of Aragon (b. 1136)
- November 7 – Uijong, Korean ruler Goryeo (b. 1127)
- Benjamin of Tudela, Spanish Jewish traveler (b. 1130)
- Benoît de Sainte-Maure, French poet and writer
- Fujiwara no Ikushi, Japanese empress (b. 1146)
- Hemachandra, Indian poet and polymath (b. 1088)
- Kol of Sweden, Swedish ruler of Östergötland
- Narasimha I, Indian ruler of the Hoysala Empire
- Raimbaut d'Aurenga, French troubadour (b. 1147)
- Rajaraja II, Indian ruler of the Chola dynasty
- Reginald Fitzurse, English nobleman (b. 1145)
- Roger de Clare, 2nd Earl of Hertford (b. 1116)
- Vladimir III, Grand Prince of Kiev (b. 1132)

1174

- January 18 – Vladislaus II, duke of Bohemia (b. 1110)
- April 6 – Umara al-Yamani, Yemeni poet and historian (b. 1121)
- May 15 – Nur al-Din, Seljuk ruler of Syria (b. 1118)
- June 28 – Andrei Bogolyubsky, prince of Vladimir
- July 11 – Amalric I, king of Jerusalem (b. 1136)
- September 17 – Pietro di Miso, Italian cardinal
- September 22 – Uhtred, Lord of Galloway
- October 10 – Adela of Ponthieu, Countess of Surrey
- Ananda Thuriya, Burmese minister and poet
- Arnau Mir (or Arnal), count of Pallars Jussà
- Enguerrand (or Ingram), bishop of Glasgow
- Everard des Barres, French Grand Master
- Gilla Mo Chaidbeo, Irish monk and abbot
- Miles of Plancy (or Milo), French nobleman
- Mu'ayyid al-Din Ai-Aba, ruler of Nishapur
- Peter II of Tarentaise, French bishop (b. 1102)
- Shin Panthagu, Burmese monk (b. 1083)
- Walter of Mortagne, French philosopher
- Walter of Saint Omer, prince of Galilee
- William de Chesney, English nobleman
- William de Turbeville, English bishop

1175

- January 12 – Yi Ui-bang, Korean military leader (b. 1121)
- January 24 – Ibn Asakir, Syrian historian and mystic (b. 1105)
- March 5 – Frederick of Hallum, Frisian priest and abbot
- May 15 – Mleh I, prince of Armenia
- May 25 – Ishoyahb V, patriarch of the Church of the East
- July 1 – Reginald de Dunstanville, English nobleman (b. 1110)
- July 27 – Ponce de Minerva, French nobleman and general
- October 19 – Andrew of Saint Victor, English abbot and scholar
- November 13 – Henry of France, archbishop of Reims (b. 1121)
- Ibn Saad al-Khair al-Balancy, Arab Andalusian linguist and poet (b. 1116)
- Clementia of Zähringen, duchess of Bavaria and Saxony
- Maria Torribia, Spanish laywoman and hermit
- Nicholas Hagiotheodorites, Byzantine scholar and official

1176

- April 18 – Galdino della Sala, Italian archbishop (b. 1096)
- April 20 – Richard de Clare, English nobleman (b. 1130)
- May 8 – David FitzGerald, bishop of St. Davids (b. 1106)
- May 13 – Matthias I, duke of Lorraine (b. 1119)
- July 20 – Yoshika, Japanese empress (b. 1141)
- August 23 – Rokujō, emperor of Japan (b. 1164)
- September 1 – Maurice FitzGerald, English nobleman
- September 17
  - Baldwin of Antioch, French nobleman
  - John Kantakouzenos, Byzantine general
- October 12 – William d'Aubigny, English politician (b. 1109)
- Ahmad ibn Muhammad Sajawandi, Persian chronicler
- Chekawa Yeshe Dorje, Tibetan Buddhist monk (b. 1102)
- Constance of France, French princess (approximate date)
- Fujiwara no Teishi, Japanese noblewoman (b. 1131)
- Jaksa Gryfita, Polish nobleman and knight (b. 1120)
- John Doukas (Komnenos), Byzantine governor (b. 1128)
- Klængur Þorsteinsson, bishop of Skálholt (b. 1102)
- Margrethe of Roskilde, Danish noblewoman and saint
- Michael Aspietes, Byzantine nobleman and general
- Rosamund Clifford (the Fair), mistress of Henry II
- Sancha Ponce de Cabrera, Spanish noblewoman
- Volodar Glebovich, prince of Minsk (approximate date)

1177

- January 13 – Henry II, Duke of Austria (b. 1107)
- January – Eystein Meyla, leader of the Birkebeiner in Norway. (b. 1157)
- June – William of Montferrat, Count of Jaffa and Ascalon, father of Baldwin V of Jerusalem (b. early 1140s)
- probable – Hugh Bigod, 1st Earl of Norfolk (b. 1095)

1178

- February 17 – Evermode of Ratzeburg, German bishop
- May 27 – Godfrey van Rhenen, bishop of Utrecht
- December 30 – Pribislav, prince of Mecklenburg
- Áedh Ua Flaithbheartaigh, king of Iar Connacht
- Ada de Warenne, Scottish noblewoman (b. 1120)
- Amadeus I, Swiss nobleman (House of Geneva)
- Anthelm of Belley, French prior and bishop (b. 1107)
- Frowin of Engelberg (the Blessed), Swiss abbot
- Fujiwara no Narichika, Japanese nobleman (b. 1138)
- Kristin Sigurdsdatter, Norwegian princess (b. 1125)
- Nashwan al-Himyari, Arab theologian and writer
- Petrus Comestor, French theologian and writer
- Philippa of Antioch, princess of Antioch (b. 1148)
- Richard the Chaplain, bishop of Cell Rigmonaid
- Walter de Bidun, English bishop and chancellor
- William of Lucca, Italian theologian and writer

1179

- February 25 – Adelelm, English Lord High Treasurer
- April 22 – Humphrey II, constable and lord of Toron (b. 1117)
- June 18 – Erling Skakke, Norwegian nobleman (b. 1115)
- July 14 – Richard de Luci, Norman High Sheriff (b. 1089)
- July 27 – Mudzaffar Shah I, ruler of the Kedah Sultanate
- August 9 – Roger of Worcester, English bishop (b. 1118)
- August 20 – William le Gros (la Gras), English nobleman
- September 2 – Taira no Shigemori, Japanese nobleman (b. 1138)
- September 17 – Hildegard of Bingen, German abbess (b. 1098)
- October 9 – Odo de St. Amand, French Grand Master (b. 1110)
- October 18 – Chŏng Chung-bu, Korean military leader (b. 1106)
- December 25 – Roger de Bailleul, French monk and abbot
- Fujiwara no Atsuyori (or Dōin), Japanese waka poet (b. 1090)
- Guihomar IV (or Guidomar), Breton nobleman (b. 1130)
- Reginald de Warenne (or Rainald), Norman nobleman
- Urraca of Castile (Alfonso), queen of Navarre (b. 1133)
