= 1178 =

1178 in various calendars
- Gregorian calendar: 1178; MCLXXVIII
- Ab urbe condita: 1931
- Armenian calendar: 627; ԹՎ ՈԻԷ
- Assyrian calendar: 5928
- Balinese saka calendar: 1099–1100
- Bengali calendar: 584–585
- Berber calendar: 2128
- English Regnal year: 24 Hen. 2 – 25 Hen. 2
- Buddhist calendar: 1722
- Burmese calendar: 540
- Byzantine calendar: 6686–6687
- Chinese calendar: 丁酉年 (Fire Rooster); 3875 or 3668 — to — 戊戌年 (Earth Dog); 3876 or 3669
- Coptic calendar: 894–895
- Discordian calendar: 2344
- Ethiopian calendar: 1170–1171
- Hebrew calendar: 4938–4939
- Hindu calendars
- Vikram Samvat: 1234–1235
- Shaka Samvat: 1099–1100
- Kali Yuga: 4278–4279
- Holocene calendar: 11178
- Igbo calendar: 178–179
- Iranian calendar: 556–557
- Islamic calendar: 573–574
- Japanese calendar: Jishō 2 (治承２年)
- Javanese calendar: 1085–1086
- Julian calendar: 1178; MCLXXVIII
- Korean calendar: 3511
- Minguo calendar: 734 before ROC 民前734年
- Nanakshahi calendar: −290
- Seleucid era: 1489/1490 AG
- Thai solar calendar: 1720–1721
- Tibetan calendar: མེ་མོ་བྱ་ལོ་ (female Fire-Bird); 1304 or 923 or 151 — to — ས་ཕོ་ཁྱི་ལོ་ (male Earth-Dog); 1305 or 924 or 152

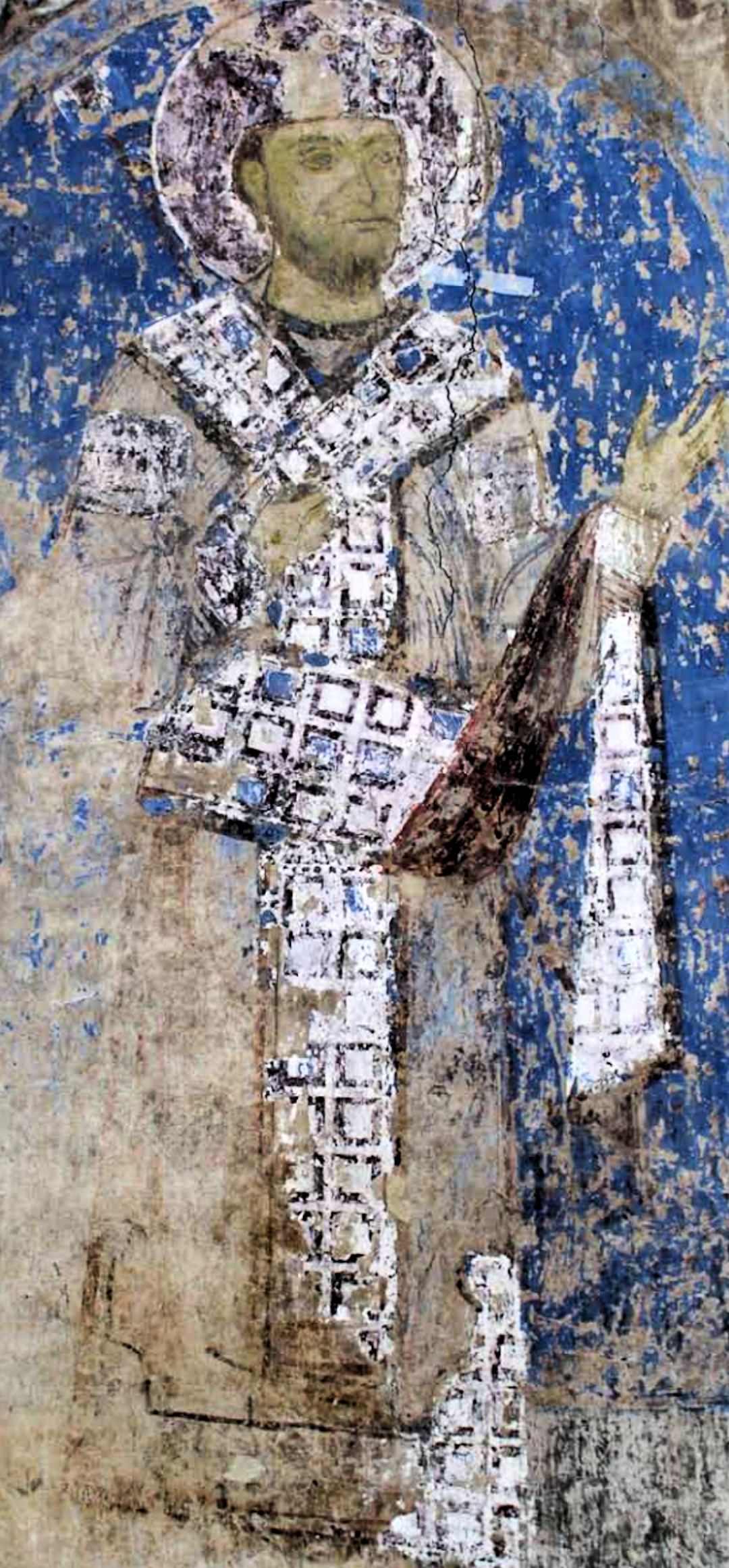
Fresco of George III (r. 1156–1184)

Year 1178 (MCLXXVIII) was a common year starting on Sunday of the Julian calendar, the 1178th year of the Common Era (CE) and Anno Domini (AD) designations, the 178th year of the 2nd millennium, the 78th year of the 12th century, and the 9th year of the 1170s decade.

== Events ==
=== By place ===
==== Europe ====
- June 18 – Five monks from the Canterbury Abbey report the appearance of a flaming torch spewing hot coals and sparks from the upper portion of the crescent moon.
- June 30 – Emperor Frederick I (Barbarossa) is crowned King of Burgundy at Arles. He will repeat the ceremony in 1186. Returning to Germany, he begins proceedings against Henry III (the Lion), duke of Saxony, who has been charged by Saxon noblemen with breaking the king's peace.
- July 17 – Saracen pirates, from the Balearic Islands, raid the Cistercian monastery of Saint Honorat on the Lérins Islands, and the city of Toulon, killing an estimated 300 and taking captives. The surviving captives are freed from the Balearic Islands in 1185.
- King George III of Georgia defeats a nobles' revolt and proclaims his 18-year-old daughter Tamar (the Great) as co-ruler of Georgia.
- Orio Mastropiero is elected by the Council of Forty as doge of Venice, following the retirement of Sebastiano Ziani.
- Portuguese forces under King Afonso I (the Conqueror) capture the city of Beja from the Almohads.

==== Asia ====
- August 17 – A battle occurs as a Latin force raids the vicinity of Hama, Syria.

=== By topic ===
==== Art and Science ====
- The Leaning Tower of Pisa begins to lean, as the third level is completed (approximate date).

==== Religion ====
- Summer – Antipope Callixtus III submits to Pope Alexander III after having reigned for 10 years with support from Frederick I.
- June 18 – Five monks from Canterbury see what is possibly the Giordano Bruno crater being formed.

== Births ==
- October 27 – Zhen Dexiu, Chinese politician (d. 1235)
- December 22 – Antoku, emperor of Japan (d. 1185)
- Alam al-Din al-Hanafi, Ayyubid mathematician (d. 1251)
- Al-Faqih al-Muqaddam, Arab religious leader (d. 1232)
- Armand de Périgord, French Grand Master (d. 1244)
- Hugh I, Sardinian ruler (Judge of Arborea) (d. 1211)
- Matteo Rosso Orsini, Italian politician (d. 1246)
- Peter II (the Catholic), king of Aragon (d. 1213)
- Roland of Cremona, French theologian (d. 1259)
- Thomas I (or Tommaso), count of Savoy (d. 1233)
- Wei Liaoweng, Chinese politician and philosopher (d. 1237)
- Wuzhun Shifan, Chinese calligrapher and painter (d. 1249)

== Deaths ==
- February 17 – Evermode of Ratzeburg, German bishop
- May 27 – Godfrey van Rhenen, bishop of Utrecht
- December 30 – Pribislav, prince of Mecklenburg
- Áedh Ua Flaithbheartaigh, king of Iar Connacht
- Ada de Warenne, Scottish noblewoman (b. 1120)
- Amadeus I, Swiss nobleman (House of Geneva)
- Anthelm of Belley, French prior and bishop (b. 1107)
- Frowin of Engelberg (the Blessed), Swiss abbot
- Fujiwara no Narichika, Japanese nobleman (b. 1138)
- Kristin Sigurdsdatter, Norwegian princess (b. 1125)
- Nashwan al-Himyari, Arab theologian and writer
- Petrus Comestor, French theologian and writer
- Philippa of Antioch, princess of Antioch (b. 1148)
- Richard the Chaplain, bishop of Cell Rigmonaid
- Walter de Bidun, English bishop and chancellor
- William of Lucca, Italian theologian and writer
