= 1174 =

1174 in various calendars
- Gregorian calendar: 1174; MCLXXIV
- Ab urbe condita: 1927
- Armenian calendar: 623; ԹՎ ՈԻԳ
- Assyrian calendar: 5924
- Balinese saka calendar: 1095–1096
- Bengali calendar: 580–581
- Berber calendar: 2124
- English Regnal year: 20 Hen. 2 – 21 Hen. 2
- Buddhist calendar: 1718
- Burmese calendar: 536
- Byzantine calendar: 6682–6683
- Chinese calendar: 癸巳年 (Water Snake); 3871 or 3664 — to — 甲午年 (Wood Horse); 3872 or 3665
- Coptic calendar: 890–891
- Discordian calendar: 2340
- Ethiopian calendar: 1166–1167
- Hebrew calendar: 4934–4935
- Hindu calendars
- Vikram Samvat: 1230–1231
- Shaka Samvat: 1095–1096
- Kali Yuga: 4274–4275
- Holocene calendar: 11174
- Igbo calendar: 174–175
- Iranian calendar: 552–553
- Islamic calendar: 569–570
- Japanese calendar: Jōan 4 (承安４年)
- Javanese calendar: 1081–1082
- Julian calendar: 1174; MCLXXIV
- Korean calendar: 3507
- Minguo calendar: 738 before ROC 民前738年
- Nanakshahi calendar: −294
- Seleucid era: 1485/1486 AG
- Thai solar calendar: 1716–1717
- Tibetan calendar: ཆུ་མོ་སྦྲུལ་ལོ་ (female Water-Snake); 1300 or 919 or 147 — to — ཤིང་ཕོ་རྟ་ལོ་ (male Wood-Horse); 1301 or 920 or 148

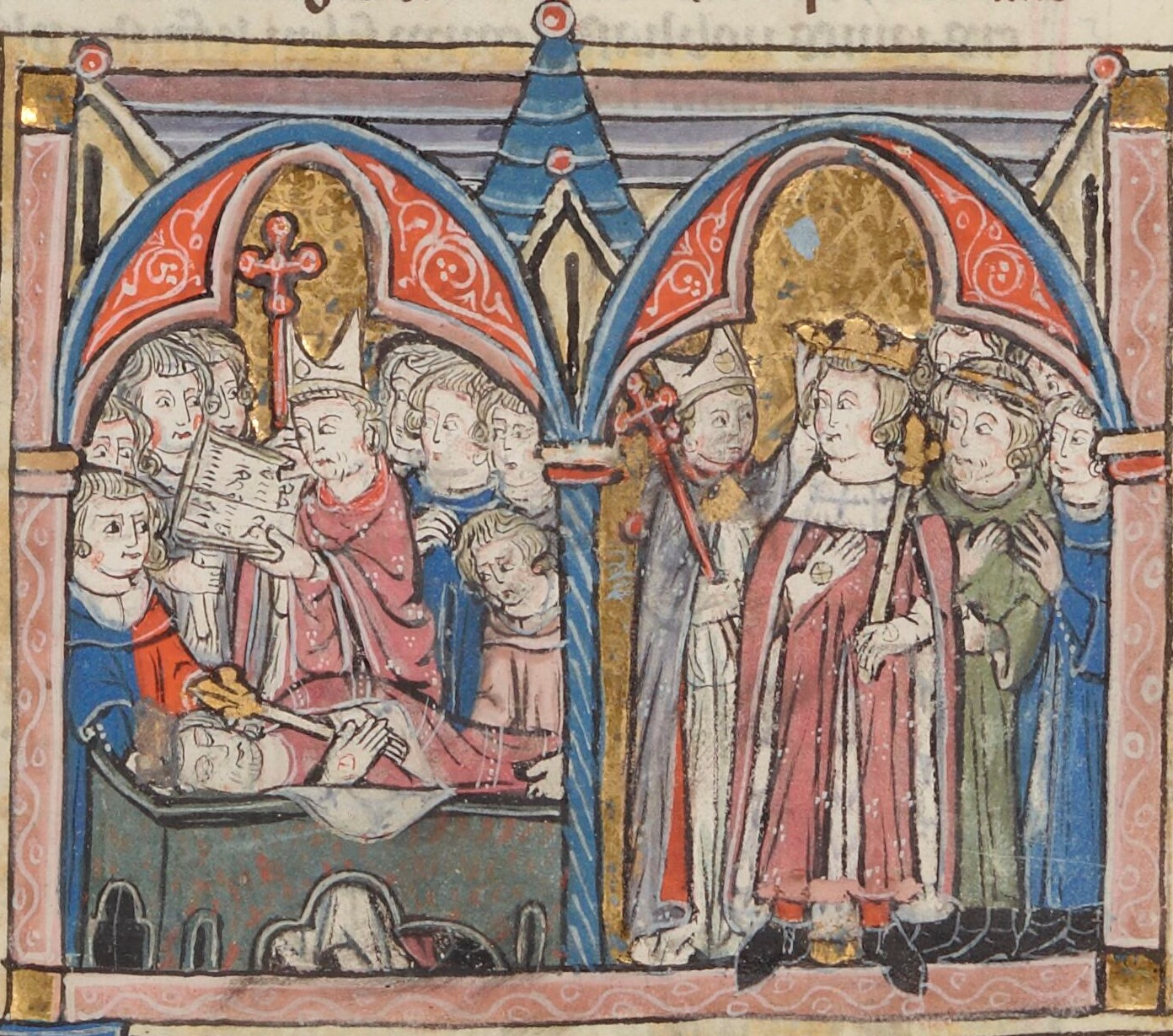
Baldwin IV becomes king of Jerusalem after the death of his father Amalric I (left).

Year 1174 (MCLXXIV) was a common year starting on Tuesday of the Julian calendar, the 1174th year of the Common Era (CE) and Anno Domini (AD) designations, the 174th year of the 2nd millennium, the 74th year of the 12th century, and the 5th year of the 1170s decade.

== Events ==
=== By place ===
==== Britain ====
- July 13 – Battle of Alnwick: King William I (the Lion), supported by Flemish mercenaries, invades England, to help fight in the baronial rebellion against King Henry II. William attacks Prudhoe Castle in Northumberland, but is unable to capture it. He is captured by Lord Ranulf de Glanvill, and brought back to Newcastle. Henry occupies a part of Scotland, with its five strongest castles: Roxburgh, Berwick, Jedburgh, Edinburgh and Stirling.
- September 5 – Canterbury Cathedral is severely damaged in a fire.
- September 30 – The Revolt of 1173–1174: After a year and a half of rebellion, Henry II achieves peace agreements with his sons Henry the Young King, Richard, Geoffrey, and John at Montlouis, on the basis of the pre-war status quo. Before he returns to Normandy, Henry orders the rebel castles in England and Aquitaine to be destroyed.
- December 8 – The Treaty of Falaise: Captured by the English, William I is forced to sign a peace agreement. The treaty makes Scotland a feudal possession of England, William and his nobles swear allegiance to Henry II. He must hand over several castles to Henry in return for his freedom.

==== Ireland ====
- October – Battle of Thurles: Gaelic-Irish forces under King Domnall Mór Ua Briain defeat an Anglo-Norman invasion at Thurles in Ireland. The English expedition led by Earl Richard de Clare (Strongbow) is surprised while encamped in the area of Lognafola and is forced to retreat to Waterford.

==== Europe ====
- Summer – French forces under King Louis VII, supported by Henry the Young King and Philip of Alsace, encircle Rouen. The city holds out against the war engines long enough for Henry II to arrive in the middle of August to stage a rescue. The besiegers are fearful that Henry will invade France and the siege is lifted.
- October 29 – Emperor Frederick I (Barbarossa), on his fifth Italian campaign, begins the siege of Alessandria in northern Italy. He is opposed by the Lombard League (now joined by Venice, Sicily and Constantinople).

==== Levant ====
- May 15 – Nur al-Din, Seljuk ruler (atabeg) of Syria, dies at Damascus after a 28-year reign. He is succeeded by his 11-year-old son As-Salih Ismail al-Malik. Meanwhile, Saladin declares himself his regent and vassal.
- July 11 – King Amalric I dies of dysentery after an 11-year reign. He is succeeded by his 13-year-old son Baldwin IV (the Leper), who becomes ruler of Jerusalem. Count Raymond III of Tripoli is appointed as his regent.
- November 23 – Saladin arrives at Damascus and spends the night at his father's old house, until the gates of the Citadel of Damascus are opened to him, after a brief siege by his brother Tughtakin ibn Ayyub.

==== Egypt ====
- February – Saladin's brother Turan-Shah sails with an army and supporting fleet to conquer the Hejaz and Yemen.
- March 31 – A conspiracy against Saladin, aiming to restore the Fatimid Caliphate, is revealed in Cairo, involving senior figures of the former Fatimid regime and the poet Umara al-Yamani. Modern historians doubt the extent and danger of the conspiracy reported in official sources, but its ringleaders will be publicly executed over the following weeks.
- May – The establishment of the Sultanate of Egypt, Saladin proclaimed the Sultan.
- July 25 – The Sicilian fleet (some 250 ships) under Tancred, Count of Syracuse, launches a failed attack against Alexandria. But he is deprived of support and forced to sail away after a seven-day blockade on August 1.

==== Asia ====
- Kilij Arslan II, Seljuk ruler of the Sultanate of Rum, rounds off his conquest of the Danishmend Turks in Eastern Anatolia. He allies with the Zangid rulers against Mosul.

=== By topic ===
==== Religion ====
- April 7 – Pope Alexander III consecrates Richard of Dover as archbishop of Canterbury at Anagni. Richard returns to England bearing his pallium which he has received directly from the pope.
- July 7 – Henry II does penance at Canterbury for the murder of Thomas Becket (see 1170), even though indirect. He is whipped by the monks as punishment.

== Births ==
- Edmund of Abingdon, English archbishop (d. 1240)
- Emeric, king of Hungary and Croatia (d. 1204)
- Gerard of Villamagna, Italian hermit (d. 1242)
- Hedwig of Silesia, duchess of Greater Poland (d. 1243)
- Ingeborg of Denmark, queen of France (d. 1237)
- Liu Songnian, Chinese landscape painter (d. 1224)
- Robert de Gresle, English landowner (d. 1230)
- Sava (the Enlightener), Serbian prince (d. 1236)

== Deaths ==
- January 18 – Vladislaus II, duke of Bohemia (b. 1110)
- April 6 – Umara al-Yamani, Yemeni poet and historian (b. 1121)
- May 15 – Nur al-Din, Seljuk ruler of Syria (b. 1118)
- June 28 – Andrei Bogolyubsky, prince of Vladimir
- July 11 – Amalric I, king of Jerusalem (b. 1136)
- September 17 – Pietro di Miso, Italian cardinal
- September 22 – Uhtred, Lord of Galloway
- October 10 – Adela of Ponthieu, Countess of Surrey
- Ananda Thuriya, Burmese minister and poet
- Arnau Mir (or Arnal), count of Pallars Jussà
- Enguerrand (or Ingram), bishop of Glasgow
- Everard des Barres, French Grand Master
- Gilla Mo Chaidbeo, Irish monk and abbot
- Miles of Plancy (or Milo), French nobleman
- Mu'ayyid al-Din Ai-Aba, ruler of Nishapur
- Peter II of Tarentaise, French bishop (b. 1102)
- Shin Panthagu, Burmese monk (b. 1083)
- Walter of Mortagne, French philosopher
- Walter of Saint Omer, prince of Galilee
- William de Chesney, English nobleman
- William de Turbeville, English bishop
