= 1172 =

1172 in various calendars
- Gregorian calendar: 1172; MCLXXII
- Ab urbe condita: 1925
- Armenian calendar: 621; ԹՎ ՈԻԱ
- Assyrian calendar: 5922
- Balinese saka calendar: 1093–1094
- Bengali calendar: 578–579
- Berber calendar: 2122
- English Regnal year: 18 Hen. 2 – 19 Hen. 2
- Buddhist calendar: 1716
- Burmese calendar: 534
- Byzantine calendar: 6680–6681
- Chinese calendar: 辛卯年 (Metal Rabbit); 3869 or 3662 — to — 壬辰年 (Water Dragon); 3870 or 3663
- Coptic calendar: 888–889
- Discordian calendar: 2338
- Ethiopian calendar: 1164–1165
- Hebrew calendar: 4932–4933
- Hindu calendars
- Vikram Samvat: 1228–1229
- Shaka Samvat: 1093–1094
- Kali Yuga: 4272–4273
- Holocene calendar: 11172
- Igbo calendar: 172–173
- Iranian calendar: 550–551
- Islamic calendar: 567–568
- Japanese calendar: Jōan 2 (承安２年)
- Javanese calendar: 1079–1080
- Julian calendar: 1172; MCLXXII
- Korean calendar: 3505
- Minguo calendar: 740 before ROC 民前740年
- Nanakshahi calendar: −296
- Seleucid era: 1483/1484 AG
- Thai solar calendar: 1714–1715
- Tibetan calendar: ལྕགས་མོ་ཡོས་ལོ་ (female Iron-Hare); 1298 or 917 or 145 — to — ཆུ་ཕོ་འབྲུག་ལོ་ (male Water-Dragon); 1299 or 918 or 146

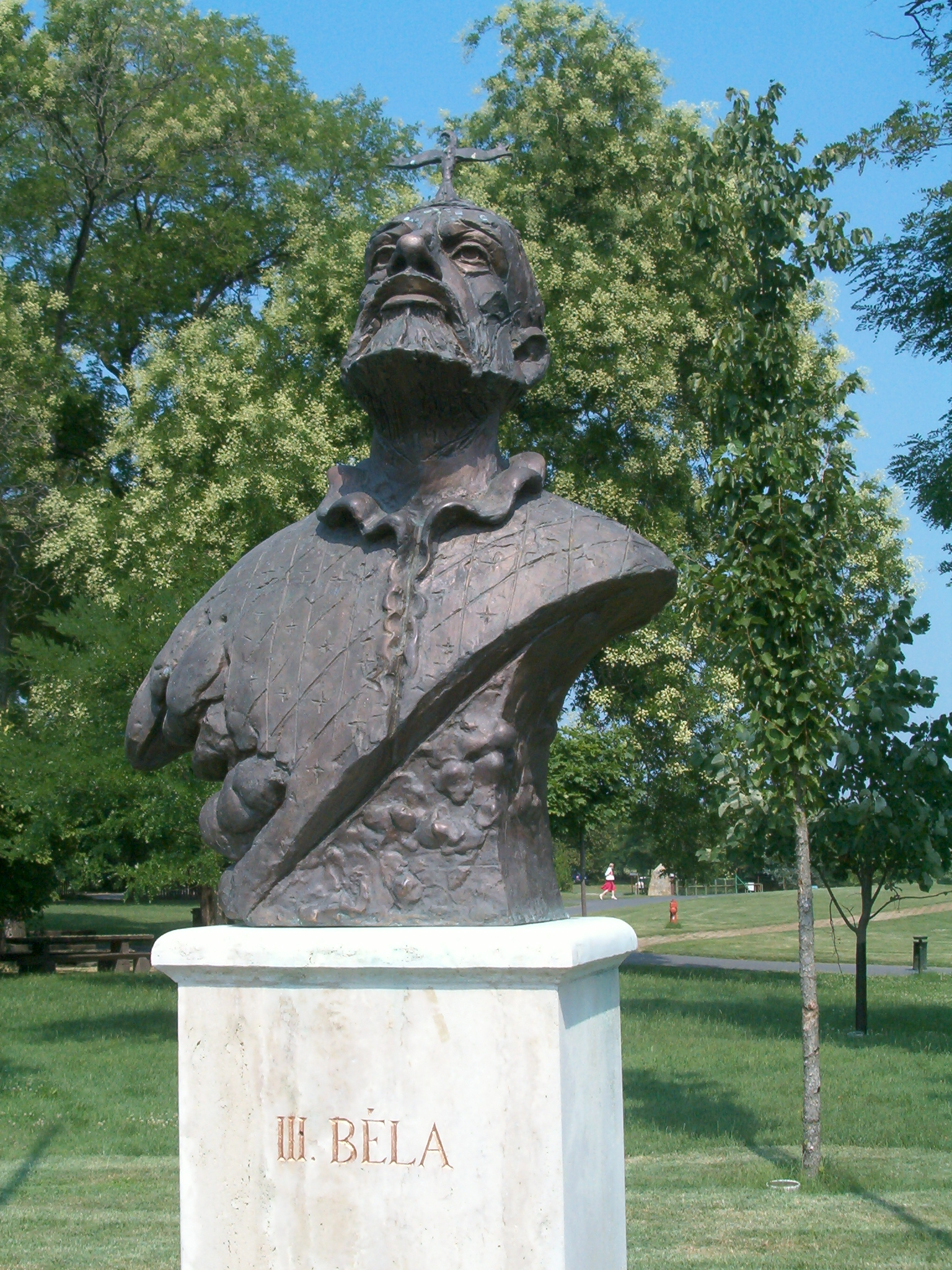
King Béla III of Hungary (r. 1172–1196)

Year 1172 (MCLXXII) was a leap year starting on Saturday of the Julian calendar.

== Events ==
=== By place ===
==== Europe ====
- April–May – Béla III returns to Hungary – where he is acclaimed king by the Hungarian nobility, after the death (possibly from poison) of his elder brother Stephen III, on March 4.
- May 28 – Doge Vitale II Michiel, accused at a General Assembly at the Ducal Palace, for the destruction of the Venetian fleet, is stabbed to death by an angry mob at Venice.
- Summer – The 14-year-old Richard (later Richard I of England) is formally recognized as duke of Aquitaine. The ceremony takes place at the church of St. Hilary in Poitiers.
- A Muslim rebellion is quelled at Prades in Catalonia; this event marks the end of the pacification of the lands recently conquered by Count Ramon Berenguer IV ("the Saint").

==== Britain ====
- April 17 – Henry II receives homage from the Irish princes who include Domnall Mór Ua Briain, king of Munster. He grants Hugh de Lacy the lordship of Meath (or Mide) for providing the services of 50 knights.
- King Henry II of England and Humbert III, Count of Savoy ("the Blessed") agree to the marriage of their respective heirs, John and Alicia. The alliance never occurs because Henry's elder heir, Henry the Young King, becomes jealous over the castles in the realm which Henry has promised to the couple. He stages a rebellion which will take Henry two years to put down. By that time, Alicia will have died.

==== Egypt ====
- Summer – Emir Nur al-Din begins a two year war against the Danishmendids. He creates a buffer zone between the Syrian realm and Egypt. Meanwhile, he releases Count Raymond of Tripoli for the sum of 80,000 dinars.
- Winter – The Nubians are engaged in a series of skirmishes along the frontier in Upper Egypt. A force of Kurdish troops under Turan-Shah, a brother of Saladin, attack the Nubians. He installs a garrison in Qasr Ibrim.

=== By topic ===
==== Religion ====
- May 21 – Henry II of England does penance at Avranches Cathedral for the murder of Thomas Becket.
- September 27–28 – Compromise of Avranches: Alberto di Morra is sent by Pope Alexander III to the Council of Avranches to investigate the Becket controversy. Henry II is absolved of censures for Becket's murder in view of his penance and swears to go on a crusade. He revokes two controversial clauses of the Constitutions of Clarendon and is reconciled with the papacy.
- c. October – The Synod of Cashel in Ireland brings Celtic Christianity more into alignment with the Latin Church (the modern Catholic Church).
- According to the annals of the Worcester Priory in England, "nothing memorable" happens in this year.

== Births ==
- July 12 – Matsudono Moroie, Japanese nobleman (d. 1238)
- Kamal al-Din Isfahani, Persian poet and writer (d. 1237)
- Al-Qifti, Egyptian historian and biographer (d. 1248)
- Az-Zahir Ghazi, Ayyubid ruler of Aleppo (d. 1216)
- Baldwin I, emperor of the Latin Empire (d. 1205)
- Conrad II, duke of Swabia and Rothenburg (d. 1196)
- Isabel de Clare, countess of Pembroke (d. 1220)
- Isabella I, queen and regent of Jerusalem (d. 1205)
- Louis I of Blois, French nobleman (d. 1205)

== Deaths ==
- March 4 – Stephen III, king of Hungary (b. 1147)
- March 7 – Il-Arslan, Khwarezm ruler (shah)
- May 28 – Vitale II Michiel, doge of Venice
- October 14 – Ludwig II, German nobleman (b. 1128)
- December 23 – Ugo Ventimiglia, Italian cardinal
- Douce II, countess of Provence (b. 1162)
- Cadwaladr ap Gruffydd, king of Gwynedd
- Hugh of Fouilloy, French prior and writer
- Ibn Qalaqis, Fatimid poet and writer (b. 1137)
- Robert FitzEdith, English nobleman (b. 1093)
- Robert FitzRanulph, English high sheriff
- William III, French nobleman (b. 1093)
- William VII, French nobleman b. 1131)
- Henry, Prince of Capua, Sicilian prince (b. 1160)
