= 1176 =

1176 in various calendars
- Gregorian calendar: 1176; MCLXXVI
- Ab urbe condita: 1929
- Armenian calendar: 625; ԹՎ ՈԻԵ
- Assyrian calendar: 5926
- Balinese saka calendar: 1097–1098
- Bengali calendar: 582–583
- Berber calendar: 2126
- English Regnal year: 22 Hen. 2 – 23 Hen. 2
- Buddhist calendar: 1720
- Burmese calendar: 538
- Byzantine calendar: 6684–6685
- Chinese calendar: 乙未年 (Wood Goat); 3873 or 3666 — to — 丙申年 (Fire Monkey); 3874 or 3667
- Coptic calendar: 892–893
- Discordian calendar: 2342
- Ethiopian calendar: 1168–1169
- Hebrew calendar: 4936–4937
- Hindu calendars
- Vikram Samvat: 1232–1233
- Shaka Samvat: 1097–1098
- Kali Yuga: 4276–4277
- Holocene calendar: 11176
- Igbo calendar: 176–177
- Iranian calendar: 554–555
- Islamic calendar: 571–572
- Japanese calendar: Angen 2 (安元２年)
- Javanese calendar: 1083–1084
- Julian calendar: 1176; MCLXXVI
- Korean calendar: 3509
- Minguo calendar: 736 before ROC 民前736年
- Nanakshahi calendar: −292
- Seleucid era: 1487/1488 AG
- Thai solar calendar: 1718–1719
- Tibetan calendar: ཤིང་མོ་ལུག་ལོ་ (female Wood-Sheep); 1302 or 921 or 149 — to — མེ་ཕོ་སྤྲེ་ལོ་ (male Fire-Monkey); 1303 or 922 or 150

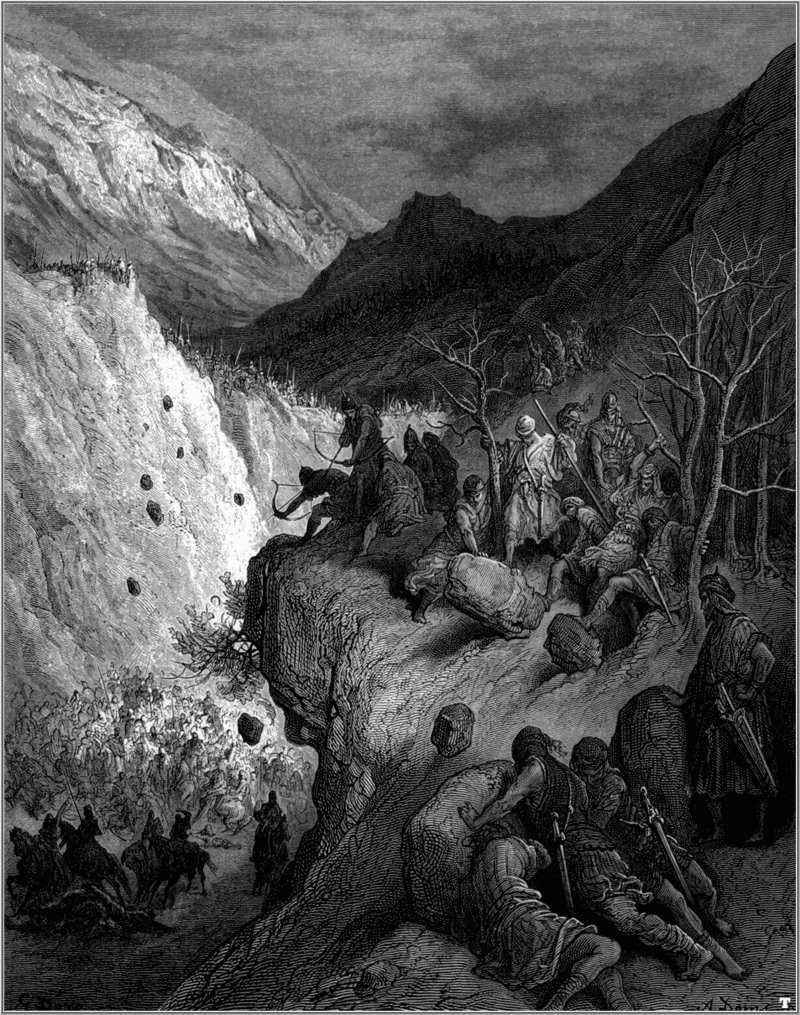
The Rum Turks ambush the Byzantines at the pass of Myriokephalon (1880).

Year 1176 (MCLXXVI) was a leap year starting on Thursday of the Julian calendar, the 1176th year of the Common Era (CE) and Anno Domini (AD) designations, the 176th year of the 2nd millennium, the 76th year of 12th century, and the 7th year of the 1170s decade.

== Events ==
=== By place ===
==== Byzantine Empire ====
- Summer – Emperor Manuel I (Komnenos) assembles a Byzantine expeditionary force, and marches towards Iconium, the Seljuk capital. Meanwhile, hordes of Seljuk Turks destroy crops and poison water supplies, to make Manuel's march more difficult, and harass the Byzantine army, in order to force it into the Meander Valley. Kilij Arslan II, ruler of the Sultanate of Rum, hears of the expedition, and sends envoys to ask for peace.
- September 17 – Battle of Myriokephalon: The Seljuk Turks defeat the Byzantine forces led by Manuel I, who are ambushed when moving through a narrow mountain pass near Lake Beyşehir. The Byzantines are dispersed and surrounded. They suffer heavy casualties and their siege equipment is destroyed. Manuel flees in panic and is forced to sign a peace treaty with Kilij Arslan II.

==== Europe ====
- May 29 – Battle of Legnano: The Imperial army (some 5,500 men) led by Emperor Frederick I (Barbarossa) is defeated by forces of the Lombard League, leading to the pactum Anagnium (the Agreement of Anagni).

==== Britain ====
- Spring – Assize of Northampton: King Henry II establishes the rules for the administration of criminal justice that he has set out in 1166 at Clarendon.
- Winter – An international bardic festival at Cardigan Castle in Wales. The first recorded eisteddfod.

==== Egypt ====
- Al-Adil I, Ayyubid governor of Egypt, suppresses a revolt by the Christian Copts in the city of Qift, hanging nearly 3,000 of them on the trees near the city.

==== Levant ====
- Spring – Saladin defeats the Zangid forces before Damascus and marries Nur al-Din's widow Asimat. On June 24 he accepts a truce and is recognized as the sovereign over Syria.
- Summer – Saladin ends his siege of the Ismaili ("Assassins") fortress of Masyaf, which is commanded by Rashid al-Din Sinan.
- Autumn – William of Montferrat (Longsword) marries the 16-year-old Princess Sibylla, sister of King Baldwin IV (the Leper).
- Raynald of Châtillon is released and ransomed from prison in Aleppo, together with Joscelin III, the titular count of Edessa.

==== Asia ====
- Unkei, a Japanese sculptor, completes his Dainichi Nyorai (Enjō-ji) statue, now a National Treasure of Japan.

=== By topic ===
==== Religion ====
- Autumn – Frederick I makes peace with Pope Alexander III and recognizes his legitimacy as pope of the Catholic Church.
- Sens Cathedral in Burgundy installs an horologe, presumed to be an early form of clock.
- The Carthusians are approved as a religious order.

== Births ==
- October 15 – Leopold VI, German nobleman (d. 1230)
- Agnes of Hohenstaufen, German noblewoman (d. 1204)
- Al-Mu'azzam Isa, Ayyubid ruler of Damascus (d. 1227)
- Anna Komnene Angelina, Nicene empress (d. 1212)
- Fujiwara no Nobuzane, Japanese painter (d. 1265)
- Hachijō-in Takakura, Japanese waka poet (d. 1248)
- Henry de Bohun, 1st Earl of Hereford (d. 1220)
- Hugh de Lacy, 1st Earl of Ulster (approximate date)
- Maud le Vavasour, English noblewoman (d. 1225)
- Theresa of Portugal, queen of León (d. 1250)
- William Longespée, 3rd Earl of Salisbury (d. 1226)

== Deaths ==
- April 18 – Galdino della Sala, Italian archbishop (b. 1096)
- April 20 – Richard de Clare, English nobleman (b. 1130)
- May 8 – David FitzGerald, bishop of St. Davids (b. 1106)
- May 13 – Matthias I, duke of Lorraine (b. 1119)
- July 20 – Yoshika, Japanese empress (b. 1141)
- August 23 – Rokujō, emperor of Japan (b. 1164)
- September 1 – Maurice FitzGerald, English nobleman
- September 17
  - Baldwin of Antioch, French nobleman
  - John Kantakouzenos, Byzantine general
- October 12 – William d'Aubigny, English politician (b. 1109)
- Ahmad ibn Muhammad Sajawandi, Persian chronicler
- Chekawa Yeshe Dorje, Tibetan Buddhist monk (b. 1102)
- Constance of France, French princess (approximate date)
- Fujiwara no Teishi, Japanese noblewoman (b. 1131)
- Jaksa Gryfita, Polish nobleman and knight (b. 1120)
- John Doukas (Komnenos), Byzantine governor (b. 1128)
- Klængur Þorsteinsson, bishop of Skálholt (b. 1102)
- Margrethe of Roskilde, Danish noblewoman and saint
- Michael Aspietes, Byzantine nobleman and general
- Rosamund Clifford (the Fair), mistress of Henry II
- Sancha Ponce de Cabrera, Spanish noblewoman
- Volodar Glebovich, prince of Minsk (approximate date)
