= Adelelm =

Adelelm, in Latin Adelelmus, is a masculine given name of Germanic origin. It may refer to:

- Adelelm (constable), constable of France (1071–1075)
- Adelelm of Jumièges (died 1083), abbot of Abingdon
- Adelelmus of Burgos (died c. 1100), French-born Benedictine monk and saint
- Adelelmus of Flanders (died 1152), hermit and saint
- Adelelm (dean of Lincoln) (died 1179), Lord High Treasurer of England and Archdeacon of Dorset
- Adelelm l'Almoiner (died 1218), companion of Julian of Cuenca

== See also ==
- Adalhelm (disambiguation)
- Æthelhelm (disambiguation)
