= Æthelhelm (disambiguation) =

Æthelhelm was the son of King Æthelred of Wessex.

Æthelhelm, also Aethelhelm or Ethelhelm may also refer to:

- Athelm (died 926) or Æthelhelm, first bishop of Wells and later Archbishop of Canterbury
- Æthelhelm (died 897), ealdorman of Wiltshire and possibly father of Ælfflaed, second wife of Edward the Elder
- Æthelhelm, a nobleman in whose household Oda, the future Archbishop of Canterbury had been active before becoming bishop of Ramsbury

== See also ==
- Adalhelm (disambiguation)
- Adelelm (disambiguation)
