= 1237 =

1237 in various calendars
- Gregorian calendar: 1237; MCCXXXVII
- Ab urbe condita: 1990
- Armenian calendar: 686; ԹՎ ՈՁԶ
- Assyrian calendar: 5987
- Balinese saka calendar: 1158–1159
- Bengali calendar: 643–644
- Berber calendar: 2187
- English Regnal year: 21 Hen. 3 – 22 Hen. 3
- Buddhist calendar: 1781
- Burmese calendar: 599
- Byzantine calendar: 6745–6746
- Chinese calendar: 丙申年 (Fire Monkey); 3934 or 3727 — to — 丁酉年 (Fire Rooster); 3935 or 3728
- Coptic calendar: 953–954
- Discordian calendar: 2403
- Ethiopian calendar: 1229–1230
- Hebrew calendar: 4997–4998
- Hindu calendars
- Vikram Samvat: 1293–1294
- Shaka Samvat: 1158–1159
- Kali Yuga: 4337–4338
- Holocene calendar: 11237
- Igbo calendar: 237–238
- Iranian calendar: 615–616
- Islamic calendar: 634–635
- Japanese calendar: Katei 3 (嘉禎３年)
- Javanese calendar: 1146–1147
- Julian calendar: 1237; MCCXXXVII
- Korean calendar: 3570
- Minguo calendar: 675 before ROC 民前675年
- Nanakshahi calendar: −231
- Thai solar calendar: 1779–1780
- Tibetan calendar: མེ་ཕོ་སྤྲེ་ལོ་ (male Fire-Monkey); 1363 or 982 or 210 — to — མེ་མོ་བྱ་ལོ་ (female Fire-Bird); 1364 or 983 or 211

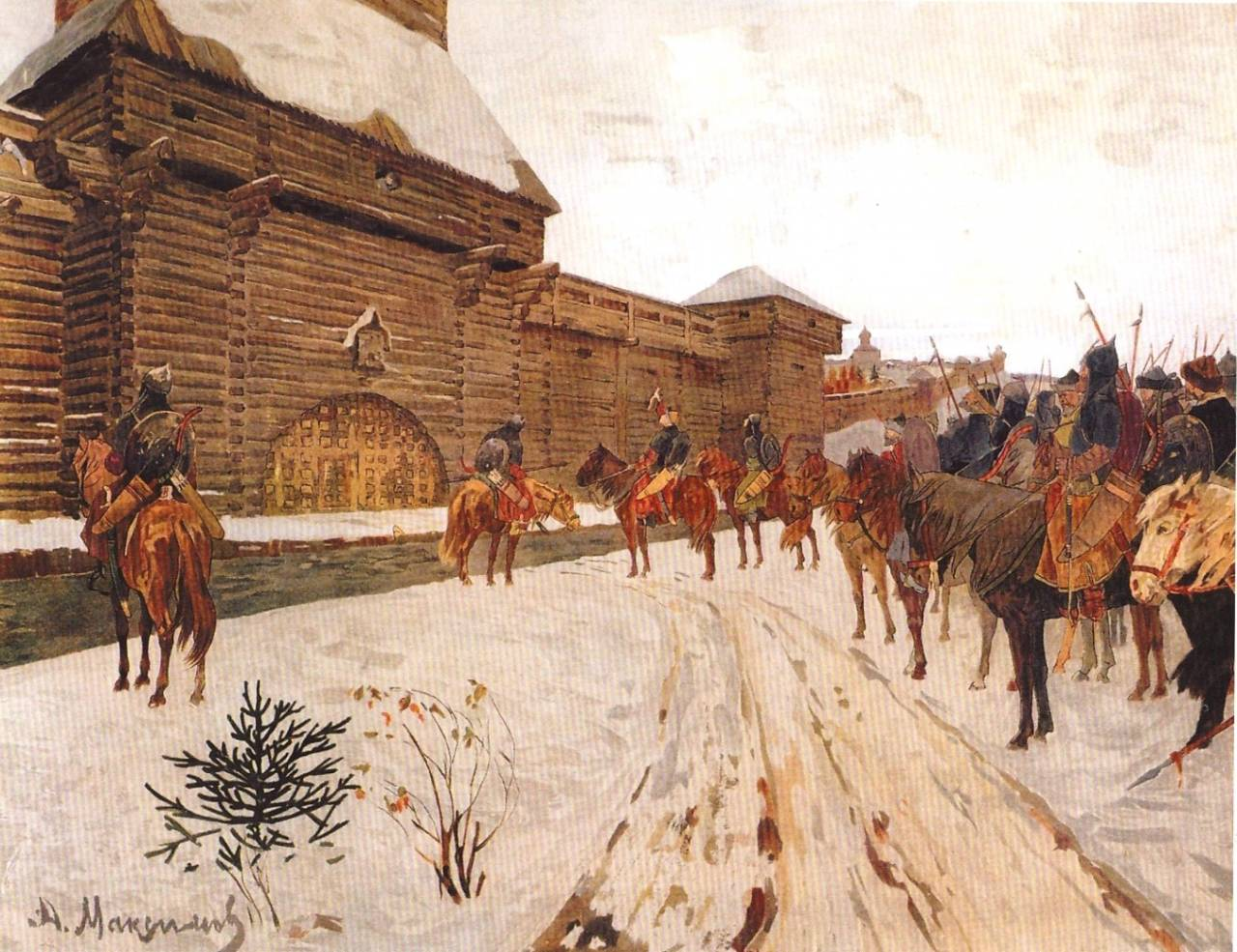
The Mongols at the walls of Vladimir.

Year 1237 (MCCXXXVII) was a common year starting on Thursday of the Julian calendar.

== Events ==
=== By place ===
==== Europe ====
- Summer – Emperor Frederick II assembles an expeditionary force (some 15,000 men) to crush the rebellious Lombard League. He crosses the Alps to Verona – where he is joined by Lord Ezzelino III da Romano, including troops from Brescia, Vicenza, Padua and Treviso. Frederick relies on his allies for support and in doing so, he provokes the opposition of earlier supporters, such as the House of Este, which now sides with the Lombards.
- August 15 – Battle of the Puig: Aragonese forces under Bernat Guillem de Montpeller defeat the Muslim army (some 12,000 men) of the Taifa of Valencia at El Puig. The Almohad forces are routed, and many of the soldiers are slain in the action. Zayyan ibn Mardanish, Almohad ruler and governor of Valencia, is forced to go into exile to Tunisia, while offering the surrender of all castles from the Turia River to Tortosa and Teruel.
- November 27 – Battle of Cortenuova: Frederick II defeats the forces of the Lombard League; about 5,000 Lombards are captured. Frederick makes a triumphal entry into the allied city of Cremona in the manner of an ancient Roman emperor, with the captured carroccio (later sent to the commune of Rome), and an elephant. During the winter campaign, Frederick captures the Piedmontese cities of Lodi, Novara, Vercelli, Chieri, and Savona.
- At the urging of King Louis IX of France, Thomas II marries Joanna, widow of Ferdinand of Flanders, and daughter of the late Latin Emperor Baldwin I. Thomas becomes count of Flanders (or Jure uxoris).
- Livonian Crusade: The Livonian Brothers of the Sword are absorbed into the Teutonic Order, as the autonomous Livonian Order. An Estonian rebellion begins on Saaremaa Island (located in the Baltic Sea).

==== England ====
- September 25 – Treaty of York: King Henry III signs an agreement with Alexander II of Scotland at York. Alexander subjects to Henry's sovereignty and renounces the Scottish claims to Northumberland, Westmorland and Cumberland. This establishes the Anglo-Scottish border in a form with the future status of several feudal properties and marks the end of Scotland's attempts to extend its frontier southward.

==== Mongol Empire ====
- Autumn – Mongol invasion of Kievan Rus': The Mongol army commanded by Batu Khan and Subutai, invades the Principality of Ryazan (with representatives of all four khanates leading some 100,000 Mongol, Turks and Persian forces into Europe). In December, Batu Khan sends envoys to the Rus' court of Grand Prince Yuri Igorevich and demands the submission of the capital Ryazan.
- Battle of Voronezh River: Grand Prince Yuri II of Vladimir supported by border princes of Ryazan, Murom, and Pronsk gathers his forces and make a stand on the Voronezh River, waiting for reinforcements from Vladimir. The Mongols under Batu Khan overrun the Rus' forces, who are scattered. Yuri retreats to Ryazan, while some troops withdraw to Kolomna and join the army of Vladimir-Suzdal.
- December 16–21 – Siege of Ryazan: The Mongols under Batu Khan lay siege to Ryazan. The townspeople repel the first Mongol attacks but after 5 days the city walls are breached by Chinese catapults. On December 21, the Mongols storm the walls and plunder the capital, killing Yuri Igorevich and all inhabitants. Yuri II of Vladimir stands by and does nothing to intervene while Ryazan burns.
- December – Siege of Kolomna: Rus' forces under Yuri II of Vladimir are besieged and annihilated at Kolomna by the Mongols. Yuri barely escapes to Yaroslavl. The defenceless capital of Vladimir is taken after just 2 days. Yuri's wife Agatha (sister of Michael of Chernigov) and all his family die in Vladimir when a church where they have sought refuge from the fire collapses.

==== Levant ====
- Spring – Al-Ashraf Musa, Ayyubid ruler of Damascus, assembles his allies and secures his active support of Kayqubad I, Sejuk ruler of the Sultanate of Rum. A civil war seems inevitable when Kayqubad is poisoned during a feast at Kayseri, on May 31. Meanwhile, the Seljuks strengthen the fortresses in the eastern provinces against the Mongols.
- August 27 – Al-Ashraf becomes dangerously ill and dies after an 8-year reign. He is succeeded by his brother As-Salih Ismail – who defends Damascus against his elder brother Al-Kamil, Ayyubid ruler of Egypt. In October, Ismail has the suburbs burnt to prevent the Egyptian forces from shelter.

=== By topic ===
==== Cities and Towns ====
In England the central tower of Lincoln Cathedral collapses.

- Cölln, twin city of the later built Alt-Berlin, is founded on the Fischerinsel. The town becomes a trade center, which is linked with Magdeburg and Frankfurt an der Oder.
- Elbląg is founded by the Teutonic Order under Grand Master Hermann von Balk. He constructs a fortified stronghold on the banks of the Elbląg River (modern Poland).

== Births ==
- July 7 – Ibn Abd al-Malik, Almohad historian (d. 1303)
- Agnes of Dampierre, French noblewoman (d. 1288)
- Bohemond VI (the Fair), prince of Antioch (d. 1275)
- Isabel de Redvers, English noblewoman (d. 1293)
- John II, margrave of Brandenburg-Stendal (d. 1281)
- Ladislaus of Salzburg, German archbishop (d. 1270)
- Munio of Zamora, Spanish friar and bishop (d. 1300)

== Deaths ==
- February 2 – Joan, Lady of Wales, English princess
- March 14 – Guigues VI of Viennois, count of Albon (b. 1184)
- March 16 – Guðmundur Arason, Icelandic bishop (b. 1161)
- March 27 – John of Brienne (John I), king of Jerusalem
- April 12
  - Berengaria of León, Latin empress consort (b. 1204)
  - Philip II de Méréville, French priest and bishop
- April 15 – Richard Poore, English prelate and bishop
- May 5 – Fujiwara no Ietaka, Japanese waka poet (b. 1158)
- May 31 – Kayqubad I, Seljuk ruler of the Sultanate of Rum
- June 6 – John of Scotland, Scottish nobleman (b. 1207)
- July 29 – Ingeborg of Denmark, queen of France (b. 1174)
- August 27 – Al-Ashraf Musa, Ayyubid ruler of Damascus
- August 31 – Huijong, Korean ruler of Goryeo (b. 1181)
- December 21 – Yuri Igorevich, Grand Prince of Ryazan
- Anna Maria, empress of the Bulgarian Empire (b. 1204)
- Emo of Friesland, Dutch scholar, abbot and writer (b. 1175)
- John Halgren of Abbeville, French philosopher and writer
- Jordan of Saxony, German preacher and religious leader
- Julius I Kán ("the Elder"), Hungarian nobleman and landowner
- Kamal al-Din Isfahani, Persian poet and writer (b. 1172)
- Shunten (or Shunten-Ō), ruler of Okinawa Island (b. 1166)
- Wei Liaoweng, Chinese politician and philosopher (b. 1178)
