= Adalhelm =

Adalhelm or Adelhelm may refer to:

- Adalhelm of Autun (8th century), Frankish nobleman
- Adalhelm of Séez (9th century), bishop and hagiographer
- Adelhelm Odermatt (1844–1920), founder of Mount Angel Abbey in Oregon

== See also ==
- Adelelm (disambiguation)
- Æthelhelm (disambiguation)
