= Adelhelm Odermatt =

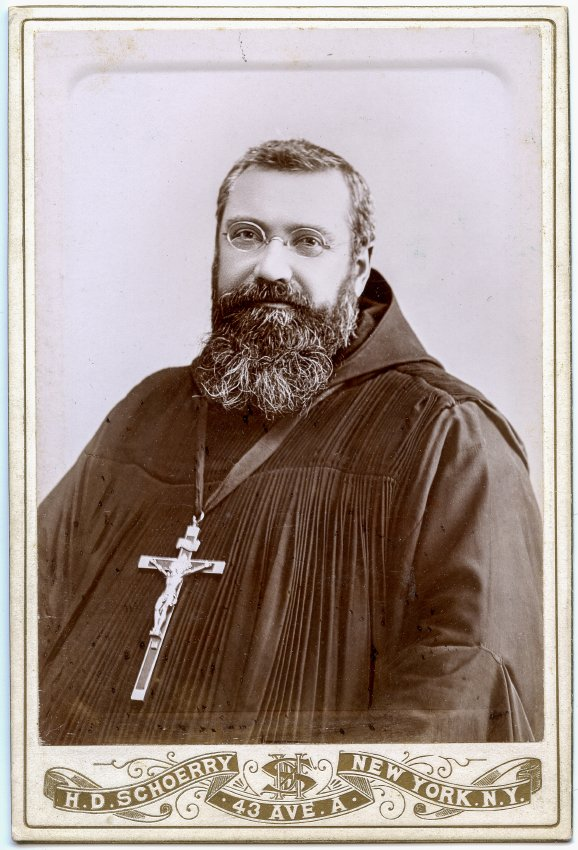
Odermatt in 1899

Adelhelm Odermatt, OSB (10 December 1844 – 6 November 1920) was the founder of Mount Angel Abbey in Oregon, and a titular abbot.

== Early life and monastic experience in Switzerland ==
Odermatt was born in Ennetmoos near Stans, Canton Nidwalden, Switzerland and attended the monastery grammar school in Engelberg. He was vested as a novice on September 29, 1865. On September 29, 1866, he made monastic vows as Frater Adelhelm. "From very early in his career as a Benedictine monk, he showed a level of gregariousness and joviality mixed with a seemingly limitless energy and zeal." After studying theology in Salzburg and being ordained to the priesthood in St. Gallen (May 3, 1869), he taught boys at the collegiate school and served as an assistant chaplain in Engelberg.

== Missionary to North America ==
In 1873, he went with his confrere Frowin Conrad to Missouri to found a monastery there (Conception Abbey). Until 1881 he was stationed in Maryville. Because of disagreements about the direction of the new foundation with Prior Conrad, who had been influenced by the monastic style in Beuron Archabbey (Germany) and St. Meinrad's Archabbey (Indiana), Odermatt left Conception with another monk (Rev. Nikolaus Frei) on June 1, 1881, and in 1882, at the request of Archbishop Charles John Seghers, founded the monastery of Mt. Angel in Oregon; the name was a direct translation of the mother abbey of Engelberg. He had twelve Fathers and Brothers from Switzerland to help with the foundation. In the spring of 1884, the community moved to the newly constructed monastery building. In 1889 Mount Angel College opened.

On May 3, 1892, the building complex burned to the ground. Odermatt resigned as prior and traveled the country as a fundraiser to collect money for reconstruction. In 1899, construction began at another location and was completed in 1903. On March 23, 1904, the monastery became an independent abbey. Thomas Meienhofer was elected the first abbot. Odermatt was installed as pastor of Sacred Heart parish in the same year.

Pope Benedict XV appointed Odermatt titular abbot on the occasion of his golden anniversary of profession in 1916. He died in 1920 at St. Vincent's Hospital in Portland, following a stroke.

== Literature ==
- "Abbot Adelhelm Odermatt †". StMBO 41 (1922) 229-231.
- "Titular Abbot Adelhelm Odermatt O.S.B. Mount Angel, Oregon †". Benedictine Monthly 1921, p. 335.
- Steckler, Gerard G. "The Founding of Mount Angel Abbey," Oregon Historical Quarterly, December 1969.
- McCrank, Lawrence J. Mt. Angel Abbey: A Centennial History. Wilmington: Scholarly Resources, 1983.
- Odermatt, Adelhelm, in Biographia Benedictina (Benedictine Biography), dated Oct. 15, 2019, URL: http://www.benediktinerlexikon.de/wiki/Odermatt, Adelhelm
