= Margaret of Hungary =

Margaret of Hungary may refer to:

- Margaret of Hungary (Byzantine empress) (1175–?), daughter of King Béla III, empress consort of Isaac II Angelos, and queen consort of Boniface I of Thessalonica
- Margaret of Hungary (saint) (1242–1270), daughter of King Béla IV (the younger of two daughters with the same name), and Dominican nun
