= 1102 =

1102 in various calendars
- Gregorian calendar: 1102; MCII
- Ab urbe condita: 1855
- Armenian calendar: 551; ԹՎ ՇԾԱ
- Assyrian calendar: 5852
- Balinese saka calendar: 1023–1024
- Bengali calendar: 508–509
- Berber calendar: 2052
- English Regnal year: 2 Hen. 1 – 3 Hen. 1
- Buddhist calendar: 1646
- Burmese calendar: 464
- Byzantine calendar: 6610–6611
- Chinese calendar: 辛巳年 (Metal Snake); 3799 or 3592 — to — 壬午年 (Water Horse); 3800 or 3593
- Coptic calendar: 818–819
- Discordian calendar: 2268
- Ethiopian calendar: 1094–1095
- Hebrew calendar: 4862–4863
- Hindu calendars
- Vikram Samvat: 1158–1159
- Shaka Samvat: 1023–1024
- Kali Yuga: 4202–4203
- Holocene calendar: 11102
- Igbo calendar: 102–103
- Iranian calendar: 480–481
- Islamic calendar: 495–496
- Japanese calendar: Kōwa 4 (康和４年)
- Javanese calendar: 1007–1008
- Julian calendar: 1102; MCII
- Korean calendar: 3435
- Minguo calendar: 810 before ROC 民前810年
- Nanakshahi calendar: −366
- Seleucid era: 1413/1414 AG
- Thai solar calendar: 1644–1645
- Tibetan calendar: ལྕགས་མོ་སྦྲུལ་ལོ་ (female Iron-Snake); 1228 or 847 or 75 — to — ཆུ་ཕོ་རྟ་ལོ་ (male Water-Horse); 1229 or 848 or 76

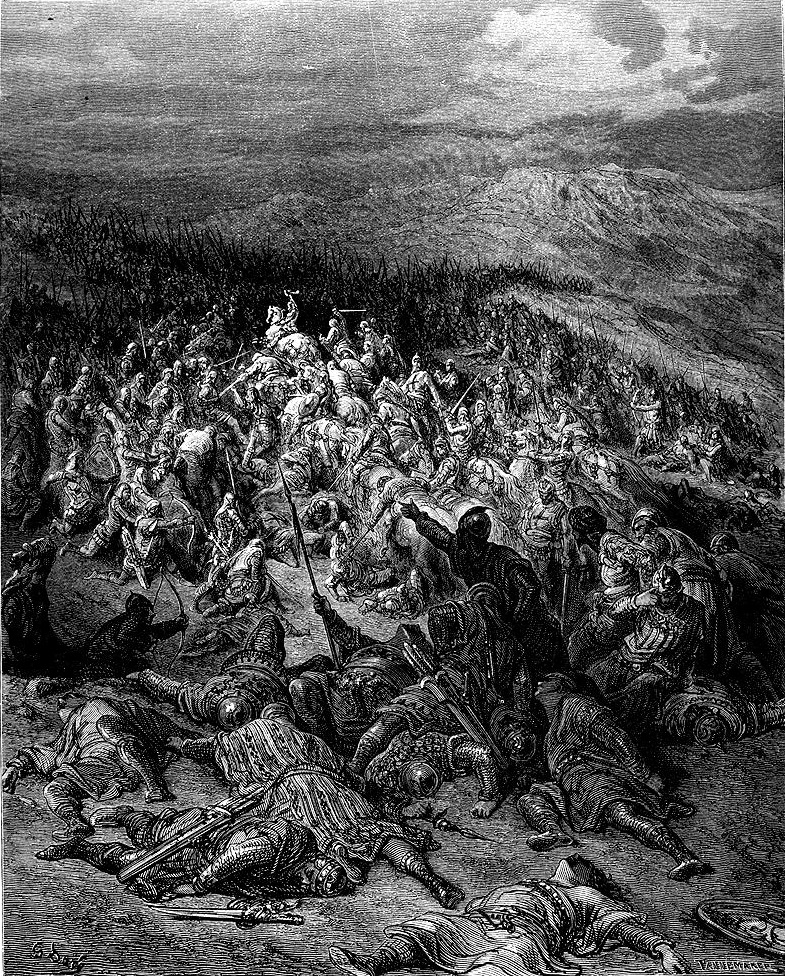
Battle of Ramla by Gustave Doré (1877)

Year 1102 (MCII) was a common year starting on Wednesday of the Julian calendar.

== Events ==
=== By place ===
==== Levant ====
- Spring – A Fatimid expeditionary force (some 20,000 men) invades Palestine and launches attacks into the Kingdom of Jerusalem. The Crusaders defeat a Fatimid rearguard near Ascalon, and capture the city after a 3-year siege. The Crusaders capture Caesarea Maritima with support of the Genoese fleet. A number of Genoese trading colonies are established along the Mediterranean coast.
- Siege of Tripoli: The Crusaders under Raymond IV begin the siege of Tripoli (modern Lebanon). The garrison calls for assistance, but a Seljuk relief army from Damascus and Homs is defeated by Raymond.
- May 17 – Battle of Ramla: The Crusaders (500 knights) under King Baldwin I are defeated by the Fatimid army at Ramla (modern Israel). Baldwin and his companions escape through the enemy lines to Arsuf.
- May 27 – The Crusaders under Baldwin I break their way out of Jaffa, which is encircled by the Fatimid Army. A charge of the French cavalry breaks the enemy's ranks, and forces them to retreat to Ascalon.
- Raymond IV is imprisoned by Tancred, nephew of Bohemond I, and regent of the Principality of Antioch (he is later released after promising to denounce any claims).
- Dagobert of Pisa is briefly deposed as Patriarch of Jerusalem (he is restored later in the year).
- The Venetians establish a new trade emporium in Sidon (modern Lebanon).

==== Europe ====
- May 5 – The short-lived principality created by Rodrigo Diaz de Vivar ends: Valencia is captured by Almoravid forces under Sultan Yusuf ibn Tashfin. It is later recaptured, evacuated and burned by King Alfonso VI.
- June 4 – Władysław I Herman, duke of Poland, dies at Płock (possibly poisoned by his enemies) after a 23-year reign. He leaves the succession to be disputed between his sons Zbigniew and Bolesław III Wrymouth.
- The Pacta Conventa formed by the Croatian nobility, recognize King Coloman as their overlord, initiating the personal union between the two kingdoms. Coloman is crowned king of Croatia (until 1116).

==== England ====
- King Henry I captures Arundel Castle after having besieged Earl Robert of Bellême. Robert loses his English lands (as did his brothers Roger the Poitevin and Arnulf de Montgomery) and is banished to Normandy.

=== By topic ===
==== Religion ====
- Council of London: A church council convened by Anselm, archbishop of Canterbury, bans sodomy and the sale of Christian slaves to non-Christian countries, and reforms the clergy.
- Henry I orders the tomb of Edward the Confessor be opened; the body of the former king is supposedly found undecayed. The Westminster monks start to claim Edward as a saint.

== Births ==
- February 7 – Matilda, Holy Roman Empress (d. 1167)
- October 25 – William Clito, count of Flanders (d. 1128)
- Chekawa Yeshe Dorje, Tibetan Buddhist monk (d. 1176)
- Eleanor of Champagne, French noblewoman (d. 1147)
- Gilla na Naemh Ua Duinn, Irish poet and writer (d. 1160)
- Henry II, margrave of the Northern March (d. 1128)
- Klængur Þorsteinsson, bishop of Skálholt (d. 1176)
- Liang Hongyu, Chinese general (d. 1135)
- Nerses IV, Catholicos of Armenia (d. 1173)
- Peter of Tarentaise, French abbot and bishop (d. 1174)
- Roger de Beaumont, 2nd Earl of Warwick (d. 1153)
- Zhu, Chinese empress of the Song Dynasty (d. 1127)

== Deaths ==
- April 9 – Raoul II, Norman nobleman (House of Tosny)
- May 19 – Stephen II, French nobleman and crusader
- June 4 – Władysław I Herman, duke of Poland
- July 15 – Walter Giffard, 1st Earl of Buckingham, Anglo-Norman magnate
- July 29 – Albert III, count of Namur (House of Namur)
- November 1 – Anna Dalassena, Byzantine noblewoman
- Ermengol V, count of Urgell (b. 1078)
- Felicia of Sicily, queen of Hungary (approximate date)
- Fujiwara no Kanshi, Japanese empress (b. 1021)
- Giselbert II, count of Roussillon
- Guglielmo Embriaco, Genoese merchant (b. 1040)
- Hugh VI, French nobleman and crusader
- Khön Könchok Gyalpo, Tibetan Buddhist monk (b. 1034)
- Mahmud al-Kashgari, Turkish lexicographer (b. 1005)
- Maurice, cardinal-bishop of Porto
- Odo I, duke of Burgundy (b. 1060)
- Odon de Châtillon, cardinal-bishop of Ostia
- Stephen I, count palatine of Burgundy (b. 1065)
- Xiang, Chinese empress and regent (b. 1047)
