= 1128 =

1128 in various calendars
- Gregorian calendar: 1128; MCXXVIII
- Ab urbe condita: 1881
- Armenian calendar: 577; ԹՎ ՇՀԷ
- Assyrian calendar: 5878
- Balinese saka calendar: 1049–1050
- Bengali calendar: 534–535
- Berber calendar: 2078
- English Regnal year: 28 Hen. 1 – 29 Hen. 1
- Buddhist calendar: 1672
- Burmese calendar: 490
- Byzantine calendar: 6636–6637
- Chinese calendar: 丁未年 (Fire Goat); 3825 or 3618 — to — 戊申年 (Earth Monkey); 3826 or 3619
- Coptic calendar: 844–845
- Discordian calendar: 2294
- Ethiopian calendar: 1120–1121
- Hebrew calendar: 4888–4889
- Hindu calendars
- Vikram Samvat: 1184–1185
- Shaka Samvat: 1049–1050
- Kali Yuga: 4228–4229
- Holocene calendar: 11128
- Igbo calendar: 128–129
- Iranian calendar: 506–507
- Islamic calendar: 521–523
- Japanese calendar: Daiji 3 (大治３年)
- Javanese calendar: 1033–1034
- Julian calendar: 1128; MCXXVIII
- Korean calendar: 3461
- Minguo calendar: 784 before ROC 民前784年
- Nanakshahi calendar: −340
- Seleucid era: 1439/1440 AG
- Thai solar calendar: 1670–1671
- Tibetan calendar: མེ་མོ་ལུག་ལོ་ (female Fire-Sheep); 1254 or 873 or 101 — to — ས་ཕོ་སྤྲེ་ལོ་ (male Earth-Monkey); 1255 or 874 or 102

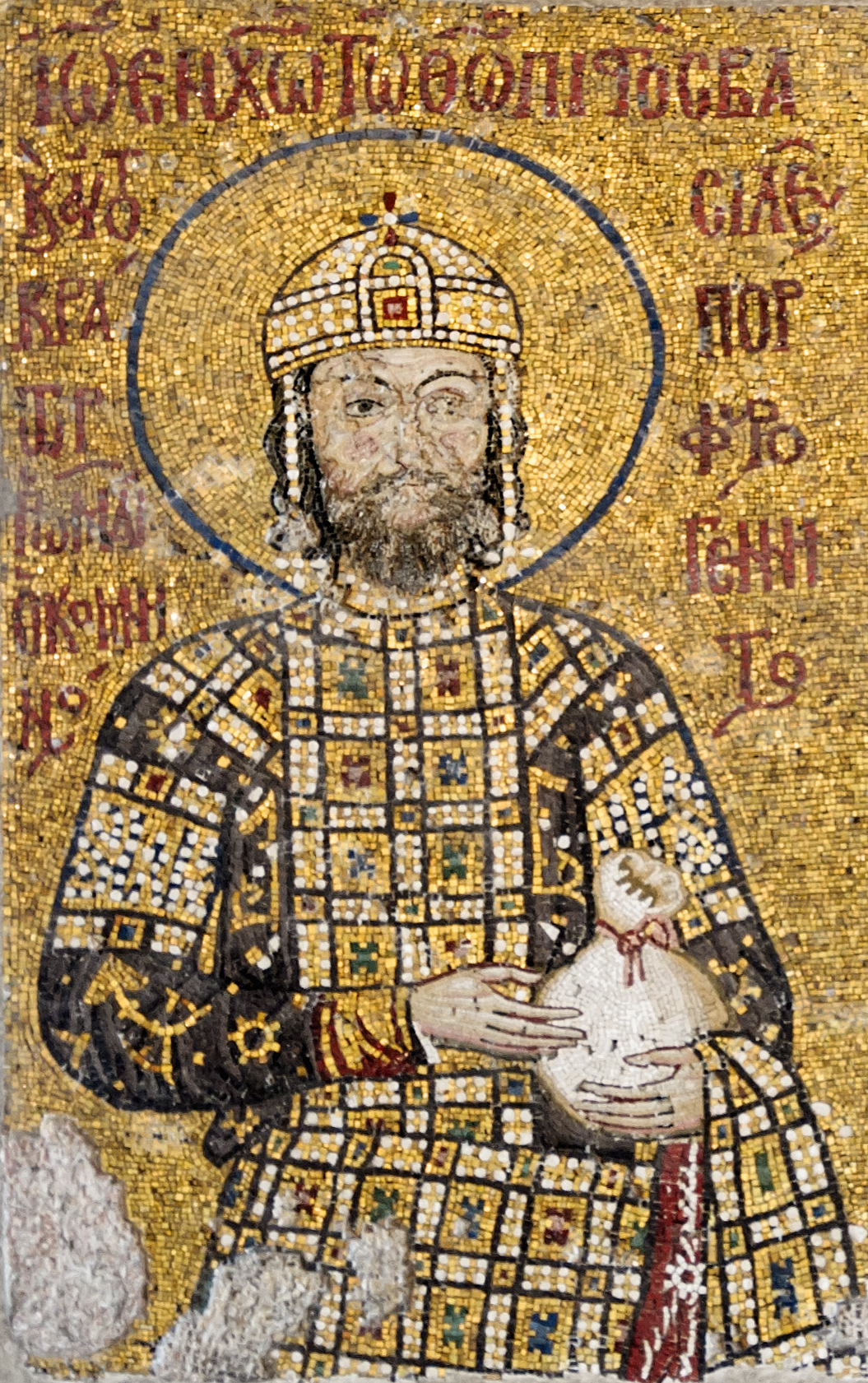
Mosaic of Byzantine Emperor John II Komnenos who defeats the Hungarians this year

Year 1128 (MCXXVIII) was a leap year starting on Sunday of the Julian calendar.

== Events ==
=== By place ===
==== Byzantine Empire ====
- Byzantine–Hungarian War: Emperor John II Komnenos defeats the Hungarians and their Serbian allies at the fortress of Haram (or Chramon), which is modern-day Nova Palanka.

==== Europe ====
- February – Saint-Omer and Ghent declare for Thierry (Theoderic) in his challenge to his cousin William Clito for the County of Flanders.
- June 17 – King Henry I of England marries his only legitimate daughter, dowager Empress Matilda, to the 14-year-old Geoffrey Plantagenet ("the Fair"), count of Anjou, at Le Mans.
- June 21 – Battle of Axspoele in Flanders: William, with his Norman knights and French allies, defeats Thierry, who is forced to flee to Bruges and then to Aalst where he is besieged.
- June 24 – Battle of São Mamede: Count Alfonso I (Henriques) defeats the forces led by his mother, Queen Theresa of Portugal, near Guimarães, and gains control of the county. Alfonso styles himself "Prince of Portugal".
- June 29 – Conrad III, anti-king of Germany, is crowned "King of Italy" by Archbishop Anselmo della Pusterla at Monza in Lombardy.
- July 27 – The city of Bruges in Flanders (modern Belgium) receives its city charter as well new walls, and canals are built.
- July 28 – William Clito dies as a result of a wound received at the siege of Aalst a fortnight earlier, leaving Thierry as sole claimant to the County of Flanders. He sets up his seat of government at Bruges and King Louis VI ("the Fat") of France agrees to his accession.
- August – Pope Honorius II invests Roger II of Sicily as duke of Apulia at Benevento, after his failure to form a coalition against Roger.

==== Asia ====
- January 15: Lý Dương Hoán became the king of Đại Việt, ascending to the throne as Emperor Lý Thần Tông.
- Forces of the kingdom of Champa invade Đại Việt.
- Jin–Song Wars: Emperor Gaozong of the Song dynasty establishes a new capital at Yangzhou, while the government retreats south, after Jurchen forces capture the previous capital of Kaifeng in the Jingkang Incident.

=== By topic ===
==== Religion ====
- November 24 – Waverley Abbey is founded by Bishop William Giffard in the south of England. The first abbot and 12 Cistercian monks are brought from L'Aumône Abbey in Normandy.
- Holyrood Abbey is founded in Edinburgh by King David I of Scotland.
- Kelso Abbey is founded by Scottish monks of the Tironensian Order.
- Honorius II recognizes and confirms the Order of the Knights Templar. The French abbot Bernard of Clairvaux codifies the rule of the Order. Hugues de Payens, French Grand Master of the Order, visits both England and Scotland, where he raises men and money for the Order.

== Births ==
(many dates approximate)

- March 18 – Stephen of Tournai, French bishop (d. 1203)
- Absalon, Danish archbishop and statesman (d. 1201)
- Adolf II, count of Schauenburg and Holstein (d. 1164)
- Alain de Lille, French theologian and poet (approximate date)
- Ali ibn Muhammad ibn al-Walid, Arab theologian (d. 1215)
- Constance of Hauteville, princess of Antioch (d. 1163)
- John Doukas Komnenos, Byzantine governor (d. 1176)
- John Kontostephanos, Byzantine aristocrat
- Lorcán Ua Tuathail, Irish archbishop of Dublin (d. 1180)
- Ludwig II ("the Iron"), landgrave of Thuringia (d. 1172)
- Muhammad II ibn Mahmud, Seljuk sultan (d. 1159)
- Ruzbihan Baqli, Persian poet and mystic (d. 1209)
- Taira no Norimori, Japanese nobleman (suicide 1185)

== Deaths ==
- January 1 – Albero I, prince-bishop of Liège (b. 1070)
- February 12 – Toghtekin, Turkish ruler of Damascus
- June 2 – Pier Leoni (Petrus Leo), Roman consul
- July 20 – Al-Ma'mun al-Bata'ihi, Fatimid vizier (b. c. 1086)
- July 28 – William Clito, count of Flanders (b. 1102)
- July – Warmund (or Gormond), patriarch of Jerusalem
- August 10 – Fujiwara no Kiyohira, Japanese samurai (b. 1056)
- September 5 – Ranulf Flambard, Norman bishop of Durham
- November 26 or 28 – Geoffrey Brito (or le Breton), archbishop of Rouen
- December 4 – Henry II, Margrave of the Nordmark, German nobleman (b. 1102)
- December 15 – Fulco I, Margrave of Milan, Lombard nobleman
- Abu Ibrahim ibn Barun, Andalusian Jewish rabbi
- Conaing Ua Beigléighinn, Irish monk and abbot
- Constantine I of Torres, judge (ruler) of Logudoro
- Fulcher of Chartres, French priest and chronicler (b. 1059)
- Ibn Tumart, Almoravid political leader (or 1130)
- Jimena Muñoz (or Muñiz), Spanish noblewoman
- Rogvolod Vseslavich (Boris), prince of Polotsk
