= Frowin of Engelberg =

Swiss German Benedictine abbot

Frowin of Engleberg (German: Frowin von Engelberg, died 27 March 1178) was a Swiss German Benedictine abbot. Though never formally beatified, Frowin was styled "Blessed" by some chroniclers. He was the second abbot of the Monastery of Engelberg in present-day Switzerland

Title Page of St. Gregory's "Moralia"- Job Visited by His Three Friends; attributed to Frowin (Cleveland Museum of Art)

== Life ==
Of the early life of Frowin nothing is known, save that he is claimed as a monk of their community by the historians of Einsiedeln Abbey in Switzerland and Saint Blaise Abbey, Black Forest. He is first mentioned as a monk of St. Blaise Abbey, and it is assumed that he succeeded Adelhelm as the Abbot of the monastery of Engelberg. As the abbey was seen in danger, he ordered the ecclesiastical buildings to be surrounded by a wall also requested and received the monastery independency to elect its abbot. During his tenure Engelberg became a Double monastery which included both a monastery for monks and one for nuns called the St.Andreas monastery.

Through his efforts the possessions and privileges, civil and ecclesiastical, of the abbey were greatly increased, while its renown as a home of learning, art, and piety spread far and wide. He established a famous school in his abbey, in which besides the trivium and quadrivium, philosophy and theology were likewise taught. The library which he collected possessed, for those days, a vast number of manuscripts. According to a list that he left, it contained Homer, Cicero, and other authors of antiquity. This rich collection perished in 1729, when the abbey was destroyed by fire.

== Works ==
Frowin not only copied books for his library, but composed several. Two of these, a commentary on the Lord's Prayer, and a treatise in seven books, "De Laude Liberi Arbitrii" ("In Praise of Free Will", but in reality a discussion of the chief theological questions of his day, directed, it is thought, against the errors of Abelard) are still extant, having been discovered by Mabillon in the archives of Einsiedeln. Frowin's other works, Commentaries on the Ten Commandments and various parts of Holy Scripture, are lost. One of the volumes of the bible of three volumes of Frowin, is deposited in the Abbey library of St.Gallen, Switzerland. The Bible is written on parchment. He also wrote one of the first Latin-German dictionaries.

== Veneration ==
Pétin ("Dictionnaire Hagiographique" I, iiii) gives 7 March as his feast day, and credits him with many miracles.
