= Gerard of Villamagna =

Hospitaller pilgrim-crusader, later a Franciscan hermit

Blessed Gerard Mecatti of Villamagna T.O.S.F. - SMOM
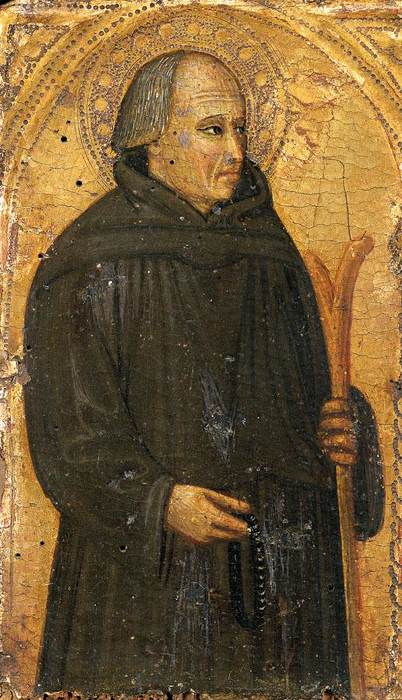
- Gerard of Villamagna, painting by Bicci di Lorenzo (15th century).
- Born: 1174; Villamagna, Republic of Florence
- Died: 13 May 1242 (aged 68); Villamagna, Republic of Florence
- Venerated in: Roman Catholic Church
- Beatified: 18 March 1833, Saint Peter's Basilica, Papal States by Pope Gregory XVI
- Feast: 13 May
- Attributes: Religious habit, pilgrim's staff

Gerard of Villamagna (1174 - 13 May 1242) - known also as Gerard Mecatti and Gerard of Monza - was an Italian Roman Catholic professed member of the Order of Saint John and the Third Order of Saint Francis. Pope Gregory XVI beatified him on 18 March 1833.

The Order of St. John maintains his feast in their Missal and Breviary.

== Life ==
He was born in 1174 in the Republic of Florence to poor parents who died in his childhood.

He was taken in by another family who raised him while a son of that family became part of the Knights Hospitaller (aka: The Order of St. John,) and chose him as his esquire to go with him on a trip to the Holy Land, though the two were taken as prisoners whilst on that crusade. That knight died during the trip and he was soon ransomed off. Gerard visited Palestine before he returned to his homeland where he voyaged with another knight to Syria on a ship with 20 others when pirates attacked yet eluded them due to Gerard's prayers. He later met Francis of Assisi and became a member of the Third Order of Saint Francis and lived the rest of his life as a hermit. All his life he wore on his garments the white cross of the Religion of the Knights Hospitaller. He was content with putting the habits of both religions one over the other, and he added the observances of vows and promises of one order to those of the other.

He withdrew into a wretched hovel not far from the place of his birth. There he led the most strict life as an hermit, entirely occupied with contemplation and penance. He wore a hair shirt, scourged himself, fasted, and humiliated himself incessantly. These practices caused his reputation for sanctity to spread; he alas called by no other name than the Antony or Hilarion of his age. Each night, so as not to be seen, he was accustomed to cover on his knees a distance of three miles. In the 17th century, the Confraternity of Saint Donino of Villamagna still covered in procession that same distance in memory of the holy penitent, but not on their knees.

Finally, Gerard Mecatti fell ill, and nuns were sent to take care of him. One night in January, as the sister asked him whether he wanted anything, he answered with a smile: "Yes, I should like to eat some cherries". She thought he was delirious. He insisted, however, and she went out partly convinced that she would find cherries. There, in a small enclosure, she saw a cherry tree full of very red and very ripe fruit "as fine and fresh as in June". It was for that reason that Gerard Mecatti is depicted dressed in grey but wearing the cross of Saint John on his breast and carrying a branch loaded with red cherries.

On 13 May 1254, he died in his hermitage, full of meritorious years and virtues. His body was placed not far from there in the branches of an oak tree, so that he might be out of reach of the fanatic piety of the villagers who would not have hesitated to dig him up in order to divide his relics. But the precaution did not suffice; the Republic of Florence had to send soldiers to protect his body in that elevated position. Then, it was decided to build a church in his honour in Villamagna. He now rests there, under the main altar, in a reliquary of stone. As late as the 17th century, his body was still well preserved and intact; it emitted a pleasing fragrance, as could be corroborated every year on the day of his feast - the second day of Pentecost - when it was shown to the people.

== Beatification ==
His beatification was approved under Pope Gregory XVI on 18 March 1833.
