= Gilla Mo Chaidbeo =

- Title: Abbot of the monastery of Saint Peter and Saint Paul in Armagh
- Died: 1174
- Other names: Machabeus, Machabeo

Religious life
- Religion: Christianity

Gilla Mo Chaidbeo (also known as Machabeo or Machabeus, died 1174) was a Gaelic-Irish Abbot.

== Biography ==
Known as Machabeus in Latin, Gilla Mo Chaidbeo was the abbot of the monastery dedicated to Saint Peter and Saint Paul in Armagh. He served in this capacity for over thirty years, dying in 1174.

Gilla Mo Chaidbeo's death is the last to be commemorated in the Félire húi Gormáin or Martyrology of Gorman, which was written by his contemporary Máel Muire Ua Gormáin (Marianus Gorman) sometime in the second half of the 12th century. The preface suggests that it was written between Ruaidrí Ua Conchobair's accession to the high-kingship in 1166 and the death of Gilla meic Liac mac Diarmata (Gelasius. Archbishop of Armagh) in 1174, while John Colgan believed that the work was completed by c. 1167.

Allowing for a few extra days, the former suggestion is made plausible by the record of Gilla meic Liac's death on 27 March and that of Gilla Mo Chaidbeo on 31 March of the same year. However, it has also been argued that these are later insertions, whether by Gorman or another author.
