= Ugo Ventimiglia =

Italian cardinal

Ugo Ventimiglia (died 23 December 1172) was an Italian cardinal. His name is listed also as Ottone. He was born in Ventimiglia. He was ordained Cardinal-Bishop of Palestrina by Pope Alexander III in the consistory celebrated in Sens in 1164 (or in 1165). Several catalogs of the bishops of Palestrina do not mention him because he does not appear among signatories of any papal bulls issued during his cardinalate.

== Sources ==
- Pius Bonifacius Gams Series episcoporum Ecclesiae catholica, quotquot innotuerunt a beato Petro apostolo (p. XVII)
- Philipp Jaffé Regesta pontificum Romanorum ab condita Ecclesia ad annum post Christum natum MCXCVIII (p. 677)
- Gaetano Moroni, Dizionario di erudizione storico-ecclesiastica da S. Pietro sino ai nostri giorni, Tipografia Emiliana, Venezia, 1840–1861, Volume LI, p. 41
