= Compromise of Avranches =

Agreement in medieval England regarding the Becket controversy

The Compromise of Avranches in 1172 marked the reconciliation of Henry II of England with the Catholic Church after the Becket controversy from 1163, which culminated with the murder in 1170 of Thomas Becket.

Henry was purged of any guilt in Becket's murder, and swore to go on crusade. He agreed to allow appeals to the papacy in Rome, and to eliminate all customs to which the Church objected. He also agreed that the secular courts had no jurisdiction over the clergy, with the exceptions of high treason, highway robbery and arson: the benefit of clergy provision in English law.

In return, the king managed to secure good relations with the papacy at a time when he faced rebellions from his sons.
