= Hachijō-in Takakura =

12th-13th century Japanese poet

Hachijō-in no Takakura (八条院高倉; c. 1176 – c. 1248) (believed to be the same person referred to as Takakura-dono, and Kunyo) was a waka poet and Japanese noblewoman active in the early Kamakura period. She is designated as a member of the New Thirty-Six Immortals of Poetry (新三十六歌仙, Shinsanjūrokkasen).

Originally, she served as a lady in waiting to Hachijo-in, who was the third of Emperor Toba's daughters. When Emperor Go-Toba read one of Takakura's poems, he was struck by it, and encouraged her to write poems for various competitions and events in the court. It was noted that she was able to read Japanese and Chinese, and she was known for her intelligence.

Rumour - and some documents - suggested that Takakura was the secret daughter of Princess Yoshiko (who was both a daughter of Go-Toba and the widow of Emperor Nijo) and a Buddhist priest, Choken. Princess Yoshiko died very soon after Takakura's birth, and Takakura's aunt, Hachijo-in, may have sent the young child to be raised by the poet Fujiwara no Shunzei. Once Takakura was old enough, she came to be a lady in waiting to Hachijo-in.

After the death of her mistress Hachijo-in, Takakura took religious vows and became a nun. She took the name Kunyo, and resided primarily at Shokutei-in on the grounds of the Daigoji temple complex at Kyoto, later moving to live at Hokkeji. She formed a close relationship with a fellow nun - and fellow former lady in waiting - Jizen.
