= Robert de Gresle =

- Coat of arms of Robert de Gresle; Or, three bendlets enhanced gules.
- Born: 1174
- Died: 1230 (aged 55–56)
- Title: Baron of Manchester
- Term: 1182 - 1230
- Predecessor: Albert de Gresle
- Successor: Thomas de Gresle
- Spouse: Margaret de Longchamp
- Parents: Albert de Gresle (father); Isabel Basset (mother)

Robert de Gresle (1174–1230) was a Lord of the manor of Manchester, the first of his family to take up residence in Manchester. Initially the Gresle family, were absentee landlords, living elsewhere, with Stewards to represent them locally.

Whilst Robert de Gresle took up residence his leadership led to an influx of skilled workers. In the early 13th century. Gresle was one of the landowners who made King John sign Magna Carta. Gresle was excommunicated for his role in the rebellion, and when King John later ignored the terms of Magna Carta, Gresle forfeited his lands. King John died in 1216 and the land was returned to Robert Gresle on behalf of King Henry III.

In this period medieval Manchester was centered on the manor house and the church of St Mary mentioned in the Domesday Book. The castle in Manchester overlooked the rivers Irk and Irwell where the Chethams School of Music stands today. The Gresle family directly leased land to tenants and created burgage tenements for indirect rent.

== Career ==
In June 1215, Robert de Gresle was amongst the landowners who demanded King John sign Magna Carta in Runnymede. Gresle was amongst the barons who eventually rose against the king during the First Barons War, resulting in his castle estates being seized by the King. The same year, Pope Innocent III excommunicated Gresle due to his role in the rebellion.

Following the death of King John, Gresle's lands were eventually returned on behalf of King Henry III. He would go on to witness the confirmation of the charter by Henry III in 1225.

In 1222, Gresle received a charter to hold a yearly fair in Manchester to be held on the eve and feast day of Saint Matthew, which was renewed when the King came of age in 1227. This was held in Acres Fields (now St Ann's Square), and continued to be held there until it was moved to Knot Mill in 1823.

== Marriage and issue ==
Robert married Margaret, daughter and heir of Henry de Longchamp. They had a son, who would go on to inherit the barony.

- Thomas de Gresle (died 1262)

== Bibliography ==
- Harland, John (1861). Mamecestre: being chapters from the early recorded history of the barony; the lordship or manor; the vill, borough, or town, of Manchester. Chetham Society. pp. 87–89.
- Farrer, William (1899). Final Concords For Lancashire, Part 1, 1189-1307. Record Society of Lancashire and Cheshire, Edinburgh. pp. 216–219 – via British History Online.
- Axon, William (1886). The annals of Manchester: a chronological record from the earliest times to the end of 1885. Manchester, London : J. Heywood, Deansgate and Ridgefield. pp. 9–10.
- Farrer, William (1902). The Barony of Grelley. The Historic Society of Lancashire and Cheshire, Liverpool, Great Britain. pp. 40–50.
- Farrer, William; Brownbill, John (1906). The Victoria history of the county of Lancaster. Vol. 1. London [Constable]. p. 329.
