= Alam al-Din al-Hanafi =

Egyptian mathematician (1178–1251)

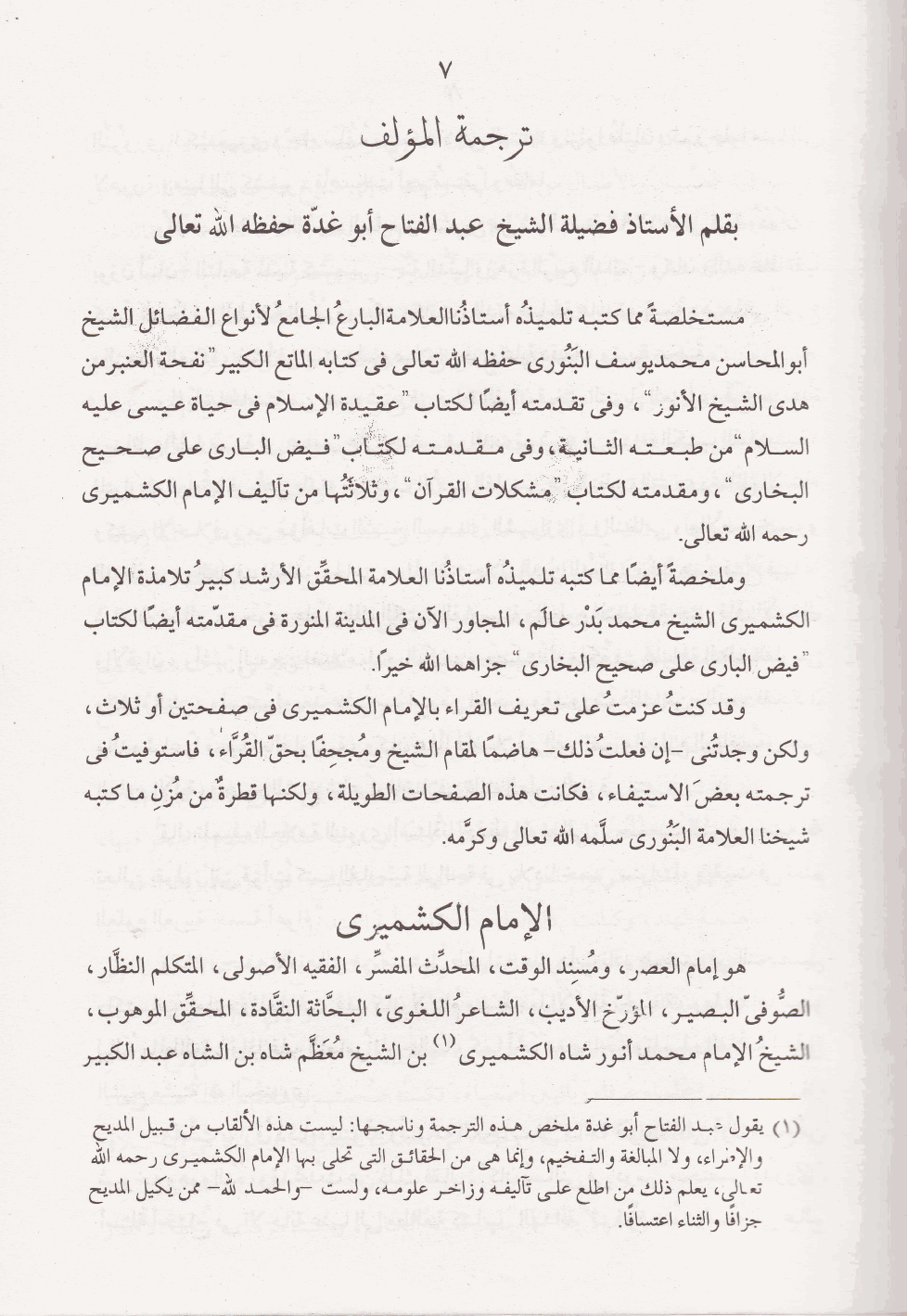
1424 biographical sketch of Al-Hanafi in Arabic

Alam al-Din Ibn-Abidin al-Hanafi (Arabic: علم الدين تعاسيف; 1178 – 1251) was an Egyptian mathematician, astronomer and engineer during the Ayyubid period.

Alam al-Din was born in Egypt, son of a well-known Egyptian scholar Abidin Ibn al-Hanafi. He later moved to Mosul and then to Syria where he settled and accomplished most of his engineering works. He died in Damascus in 1251.

Al-Hanafi wrote a treatise on the postulates of Euclid, designed water mills and fortifications on the Orontes River, and built the second-oldest Arab celestial globe in the world, that is the representation of stars and constellations given their apparent positions in the sky. The celestial globe was used by Al-Hanafi above all for some astronomical calculations, astrological purposes and as an ornament. Some of his water mills and fortifications on the Orontes are considered one of the best hydraulic engineering works in the Arab world and many still exist to this day.

== Bibliography ==
- Author: Al-Majlis al-Ilmi, Majmu'ah Rasa'il al-Kashmiri, Vol. 1, 2ed Edition (Karachi: Idarat al-Qur'an wa ‘l-'Ulum al-Islamiyyah), published in 1424, printed 2004 in a limited edition
- Author: Shaykh ‘Abd al-Fattah Abu Ghuddah, The Arabic biography of "Imam al-'Asr ‘Allamah Anwar Shah al-Kashmiri, website: Pearls of Elders, @wordpress.com
- Author: Burhan al-Din al-Marghinani, Imran Ahsan Khan Nyazee, Title: "Al-Hidayah: A Classical Manual of Hanafi Law", Vol. 1, 2006-website:Amal Press
- al-Yunini; Li Guo, ed. Early Mamluk Syrian Historiography: Al-Yūnīnī di Dhayl Mirat Al-Zaman, Vol 1, 21 Islamic history and civilization, Brill, 1998.
