= Battle of Hama (1178) =

Battle of the Hama (1178)
- Part of the Crusades
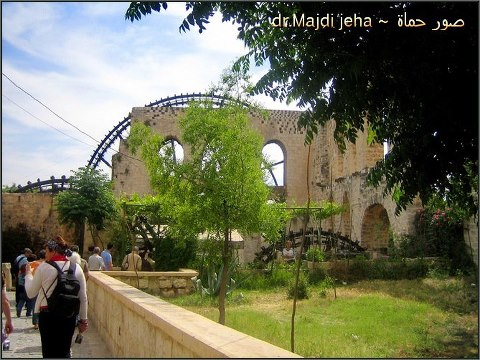
- A modern view of the city
Date	17 August 1178
Location	Hama
Result	Ayyubid victory

Belligerents
Kingdom of Jerusalem	Ayyubid Dynasty

Commanders and leaders
Unknown	Nasir al-Din Mengüverish

Strength
Unknown	Unknown

Casualties and losses
Many Crusaders taken prisoner, and later executed	Unknown

The battle of Hama happened in August 1178, when a Latin force raided the vicinity of Hama, which was under Ayyubid control. The Ayyubid repelled the raid and captured many prisoners who would be later executed.

== Background ==
In 1178, Saladin returned to Syria on a month-long journey from Cairo to Damascus to relieve the city of Harim from his enemies. That proved unnecessary. Saladin then spent the summer in Homs and its neighborhood. Despite his defeat at Montgisard, Saladin was far from discouraged, and in the next three months he was ready to meet the Franks again, but major drought conditions prevented him from doing that. The Latins, learning of Saladin's preoccupation with his affairs in Syria, decided to take an aggressive stance.

== Battle ==
On August 17, The Latin crusaders marched towards Hama. Eager for plundering and raiding, they collected a considerable number of knights and infantry. They launched their raid and began plundering and burning the villages, killing and enslaving the inhabitants. When the Ayyubid garrison learned of the attack, they marched to meet them. They were led by Nasir al-Din Mengüverish bin Khumartigin. The Ayyubids defeated the Crusaders. Many crusaders were killed and taken prisoner. They also managed to recover the spoils looted by the Franks. The prisoners were taken to Saladin in Homs. He ordered the prisoners to be executed for laying waste on the land of Muslims.

== Aftermath ==
The rest of the year was spent without any military action from both sides, and Saladin spent the winter in Damascus, preparing to face Baldwin's latest movement.

== Sources ==
- Humphreys, R. Stephen (1977). From Saladin to the Mongols: The Ayyubids of Damascus, 1193-1260. SUNY Press. ISBN 9780873952637.
- Lane-Poole, Stanley (1906). Saladin and the Fall of the Kingdom of Jerusalem. G.P. Putnam's Sons.
- Möhring, Hannes (2008). Saladin: The Sultan and His Times, 1138–1193. Johns Hopkins University Press. ISBN 9780801889912.
- Richards, Donald Sidney (2010). The Chronicle of Ibn al-Athir for the Crusading Period from al-Kamil fi'l-Ta'rikh. Part II. Ashgate Publishing. ISBN 9780754669517.
- Röhricht, Reinhold (1898). Geschichte des Königreichs Jerusalem (1100–1291) (in German). Wagner'schen Universitäts-Buchhandlung.
- Stevenson, William Barron (1907). The Crusaders in the East, A Brief History of the Wars of Islam with the Latins in Syria During the Twelfth and Thirteenth Centuries. The University Press.
