= Battle of Thurles =

12th century battle in Ireland

- Part of the Anglo-Norman invasion of Ireland
| Date | October 1174 |
| Location | Thurles |
| Result | Irish victory |

Belligerents
| Irish Coalition | Kingdom of England |

Commanders and leaders
| Ruaidrí Ua Conchobair; Domnall Mór Ua Briain | Richard de Clare; Hervé de Marisco |

Strength
| Unknown | Unknown |

Casualties and losses
| Unknown | c. 1,700 |

The Battle of Thurles took place in October 1174 near Thurles in County Tipperary, and was a significant engagement of the Anglo-Norman invasion of Ireland. The forces of an alliance of Irish led by the High King Ruaidrí Ua Conchobair defeated an Anglo-Norman expedition led by the Earl Richard "Strongbow" de Clare and forced the English army to retreat.

According to the Annals of the Four Masters (English translation):

M1174.10 The Earl led an army to plunder Munster; King Roderic marched with another army to defend it against them. When the English had heard of Roderic's arrival in Munster, for the purpose of giving them battle, they solicited to their assistance the Galls Ostmen of Dublin; and these made no delay till they came to Thurles. Thither came Donnell O'Brien and the Dalcassians, the battalion of West Connaught, the great battalion of the Sil-Murray, besides numerous other good troops left there by the King, Roderic. A brave battle was fought between the English and Irish at this place, in which the English were finally defeated by dint of fighting. Seventeen hundred of the English were slain in this battle, and only a few of them survived with the Earl, who proceeded in sorrow to his house at Waterford. O'Brien returned home in triumph.

Michael Hogan (1828–1899), an Irish poet, known as the “Bard of Thomond” described the Irish victory at Thurles as follows:

The war-fires light gleamed red all night, along the mountain gloom.
King Dónal’s men are up again, from Limerick to Slieve Bloom.
From glen and wood, the bone and blood of his fierce and fearless clan,
In wild array, at dawn of day, o’er Ormond’s plains swept on.

From Waterford the Norman hoarde to the plains of Ikerrin came.
In vengeful haste the land to waste with sword and destroying flame.
Left and right with sweeping might, the headlong hosts engaged
And life ne’er bled, in a strife so red, while that combat of bloodhounds raged.

But as the heave of the mad sea wave is barred by the crag filled shore,
So that iron tide, on Durlas’s side, was stopped by King Donald Mór.
There’s revelry high and boisterous joy from Cashel to Shannon’s shore,
And Luimneach waits to open the gates, for her conquering Donald Mór.
