= Wei Liaoweng =

Wei Liaoweng (Chinese: 魏了翁; 1178–1237) was a Chinese philosopher and politician of the Southern Song dynasty. He and his colleague Zhen Dexiu were instrumental in establishing Neo-Confucianism as the dominant political philosophy of the court at the time.

== Biography ==
His surname was originally Gao (高), but he changed his name to his uncle's. Wei was born in Qiongzhou and spent most of his early life and career in Sichuan, holding the post of prefect over several towns. At the intercession of his friend Zhen Dexiu, he was summoned to court and promoted to Minister of Rites; he subsequently held a number of other court posts. Despite being held in high esteem as a philosopher by many of his contemporaries, Wei was criticised for his inability to make profound changes to the government system in which he operated. He was satirised by a contemporary acting troupe as an ineffectual drunkard (the actors were flogged after Wei made a complaint against this slander).

Wei established a school in his home province, where he taught a philosophy based on the Cheng-Zhu school, but influenced by the works of Zhang Shi. Wei was somewhat less rigid in his adherence to the Cheng-Zhu school's precepts than other teachers, and as a result attracted students from other schools of Neo-Confucian thought. He emphasised the connection between nature and morality, and believed that knowledge and capability were innate; despite having a strong moral position and clear stance on personal practice, he was not a great innovator and is generally considered to have promoted the existing teachings of the school rather than creating new concepts within it.

After his death, the legend sprang up that Wei's ghost traveled the mountains in the company of the spirit of Zhu Xi.
