= 1114 in Italy =

- Decades
- See also: History of Italy; Timeline of Italian history; List of years in Italy

Events during the year 1114 in Italy.

== Deaths ==
- Richard of Salerno

== Births ==
- Gerard of Cremona

== Sources ==
- Beech, George. A Norman-Italian Adventurer in the East: Richard of Salerno, 1993
- Burnett, Charles (2001). "The Coherence of the Arabic-Latin Translation Program in Toledo in the Twelfth Century". Science in Context. 14 (1–2): 249–288. doi:10.1017/s0269889701000096. S2CID 143006568.
- Campbell, Donald (2001). Arabian Medicine and Its Influence on the Middle Ages. Routledge. (Reprint of the London, 1926 edition). ISBN 0-415-23188-4.
- Haskins, Charles Homer. The Renaissance of the Twelfth Century. Cambridge: Harvard Univ. Pr., 1927. See especially chapter 9, "The Translators from Greek and Arabic".
- Katz, Victor J. (1998). A History of Mathematics: An Introduction. Addison Wesley. ISBN 0-321-01618-1
