= 1106 in Italy =

- Decades
- See also: History of Italy; Timeline of Italian history; List of years in Italy

Events during the year 1106 in Italy.

== Deaths ==
- John of Lodi
- Richard II of Capua

== Births ==
- Pope Celestine III

== Sources ==
- William of Apulia, The Deeds of Robert Guiscard Books One (pdf)
- Norwich, John Julius. The Normans in the South 1016-1130. Longmans: London, 1967.
- Clarke, Peter D., The interdict in the thirteenth century: a question of collective guilt, Oxford University Press, 2007.
- Gregorovius, Ferdinand, History of the City of Rome in the Middle Ages Volume IV, part 2 (translated from the 4th German edition by A. Hamilton) (London: George Bell 1896), pp. 625–638.
- Moore, John Clare, Pope Innocent III (1160/61–1216): to root up and to plant, BRILL, 2003.
- Mann, Horace K., The Lives of the Popes in the Middle Ages Volume X (London: Kegan Paul 1914), pp. 383–441.
- Sikes, Thomas Burr, History of the Christian Church, from the first to the fifteenth century, Eliott Stock, 1885.
- The New Cambridge Medieval History, Vol.1, Ed. David Luscombe, Jonathan Riley-Smith, Cambridge University Press, 2004.
- Urban, William, The Teutonic Knights, Greenhill Books, 2003.
- Pope Celestine III (1191-1198): Diplomat and Pastor, ed. Damian J. Smith, John Doran, Ashgate Publishing, 2008.
