= 1113 in Italy =

- Decades
- See also: History of Italy; Timeline of Italian history; List of years in Italy

Events during the year 1113 in Italy.

== Events ==
- Republic of Florence conquers the city of Montecascioli.

== Deaths ==
- Andrew of Gaeta
- Gregory of San Grisogono

== Sources ==
- Bloch, Herbert (1986). Monte Cassino in the Middle Ages. Volume I (Parts I–III). Cambridge, MA: Harvard University Press.
- Falkenhausen, Vera von (1989). "Dell'Aquila, Riccardo". Dizionario Biografico degli Italiani. Vol. 37. Rome: Istituto dell'Enciclopedia Italian.
- Horst, Uwe (1980). Die Kanonessammlung Polycarpus des Gregor von S. Grisogono (in German). München: Monumenta Germaniae Historica. ISBN 978-3-921575-98-7. OCLC 185920948.
- Hüls, Rudolf (1977). Kardinäle, Klerus und Kirchen Roms: 1049–1130 (in German). Bibliothek des Deutschen Historischen Instituts in Rom. ISBN 978-3-484-80071-7.
