= 1110 in Italy =

- Decades
- See also: History of Italy; Timeline of Italian history; List of years in Italy

Events during the year 1110 in Italy.

== Events ==
- Henry V, Holy Roman Emperor Invades Italy

== Deaths ==
- Richard of Hauteville

== Sources ==
- Kleinhenz, Christopher. Medieval Italy: an encyclopedia, Volume 1. Routledge, 2004.
- Bryce, James. The Holy Roman Empire. MacMillan, 1913
- Comyn, Robert. History of the Western Empire, from its Restoration by Charlemagne to the Accession of Charles V, Vol. I. 1851
- Gwatkin, H.M., Whitney, J.P. (ed) et al. The Cambridge Medieval History: Volume III. Cambridge University Press, 1926.
- Norwich, John Julius. The Normans in the South 1016–1130. Longmans: London, 1967.
- Milman, Henry. History of Latin Christianity, including that of the Popes, to the Pontificate of Nicholas V, Vol. III. 1854
- Ghisalberti, Albert (ed). Dizionario Biografico degli Italiani: II Albicante – Ammannati. Rome, 1960.
- Gwatkin, H.M., Whitney, J.P. (ed) et al. The Cambridge Medieval History: Volume III. Cambridge University Press, 1926.
- Norwich, John Julius. The Normans in the South 1016-1130. Longmans: London, 1967.
- Chalandon, Ferdinand. Histoire de la domination normande en Italie et en Sicilie. Paris, 1907.
- Gravett, Christopher, and Nicolle, David. The Normans: Warrior Knights and their Castles. Osprey Publishing: Oxford, 2006.
- Beech, George. A Norman-Italian Adventurer in the East: Richard of Salerno. 1993.
