= 1112 in Italy =

- Decades
- See also: History of Italy; Timeline of Italian history; List of years in Italy

Events during the year 1112 in Italy.

== Deaths ==
- Benedict of Cagliari – Benedictine Bishop of Dolia, Sardinia
