= 1115 in Italy =

- Decades
- See also: History of Italy; Timeline of Italian history; List of years in Italy

Events during the year 1115 in Italy

== Births ==
- William V, Marquess of Montferrat
- Welf VI

== Deaths ==
- 24 July – Matilda of Tuscany
