= 1111 in Italy =

- Decades
- See also: History of Italy; Timeline of Italian history; List of years in Italy

Events during the year 1111 in Italy.

== Deaths ==
- Roger Borsa
- Richard II of Gaeta
- Berthold of Parma
- Felicia Cornaro

== Sources ==
- Norwich, John Julius. The Normans in the South 1016-1130. Longmans: London, 1967.
- Norwich, John Julius. The Kingdom in the Sun 1130-1194. Longman: London, 1970.
- Matthew, Donald. The Norman Kingdom of Sicily. Cambridge University Press: 1992.
- Chronology of the ipati, consuls, dukes, princes, kings, and emperors who governed Gaeta from the 9th to the 13th Century.
- The Coins of Gaeta.
- Gregorovius, Ferdinand. Rome in the Middle Ages Vol. IV Part 1. 1905.
- Staley, Edgcumbe: The dogaressas of Venice : The wives of the doges. London : T. W. Laurie
