= 1116 in Italy =

- Decades
- See also: History of Italy; Timeline of Italian history; List of years in Italy

Events from the year 1116 in Italy.

== Events ==
- Emperor Henry V crosses the Alps into Italy and takes possession of the lands associated with the inheritance of Matilda of Tuscany, who had died the previous year. The disputed succession to the Matildine lands becomes an important issue in relations between the empire and the papacy.
- March – Henry V visits Venice. During the visit, Doge Ordelafo Faliero secures imperial support for Venetian action in Dalmatia during the conflict with the Kingdom of Hungary.
- 3 February – Coloman, King of Hungary dies and is succeeded by his son Stephen II. The succession occurs during the wider Venetian-Hungarian struggle over the Dalmatian coast.
- 15 July – Venetian forces under Doge Ordelafo Faliero defeat forces connected with Stephen II near Zara. The victory strengthens Venetian control over parts of Dalmatia, although the conflict continues into the following year.
- Pope Paschal II authorizes a crusading expedition for the recovery of Tarragona at the request of Ramon Berenguer III, Count of Barcelona.

== Deaths ==
- Robert of Caiazzo, Italo-Norman nobleman and count of Alife, Caiazzo, Sant'Agata and other territories in southern Italy
