= 1105 in Italy =

- Decades
- See also: History of Italy; Timeline of Italian history; List of years in Italy

Events during the year 1105 in Italy.

== Deaths ==
- Dagobert of Pisa
- Peter of Anagni
- Simon of Sicily

== Births ==
- Pope Alexander III
- Henry Aristippus

== Sources ==
- Runciman, Steven (1951). The First Crusade. A History of the Crusades. Vol. 1. Cambridge, UK: Cambridge University Press.
- Runciman, Steven (1952). The Kingdom of Jerusalem. A History of the Crusades. Vol. 2. Cambridge, UK: Cambridge University Press.
- Skinner, Patricia (2009). "From Pisa to the Patriarchate: chapters in the life of (Arch)bishop Daibert". In Patricia Skinner (ed.). Challenging the Boundaries of Medieval History: The Legacy of Timothy Reuter. Brepols. ISBN 978-2-503-52359-0.
- Alexander of Telese, The Deeds Done by King Roger of Sicily.
- Herbermann, Charles, ed. (1913). "Pope Alexander III" . Catholic Encyclopedia. New York: Robert Appleton Company.
- Myriam Soria Audebert, "Pontifical Propaganda during the Schisms: Alexander III to the reconquest of Church Unity," in Convaincre et persuader: Communication et propagande aux XII et XIIIe siècles. Ed. par Martin Aurell. Poitiers: Université de Poitiers-centre d'études supérieures de civilisation médiévale, 2007,
- Hugo Falcandus. History of the Tyrants of Sicily at the Latin Library.
- Norwich, John Julius. The Kingdom in the Sun 1130-1194. Longman: London, 1970.
- Matthew, Donald. The Norman Kingdom of Sicily. Cambridge University Press: 1992.
- Houben, Hubert. Roger II of Sicily: A Ruler between East and West. Trans. G. A. Loud and Diane Milbourne. Cambridge University Press: 2002.
