= 1287 in Italy =

| List of years in Italy |
- … 1277; 1278; 1279; 1280; 1281; 1282; 1283; 1284; 1285; 1286; 1287; 1288; 1289; 1290; 1291; 1292; 1293; 1294; 1295; 1296; 1297 …
- Art; Archaeology; Architecture; Literature; Music; Philosophy; Science; +...

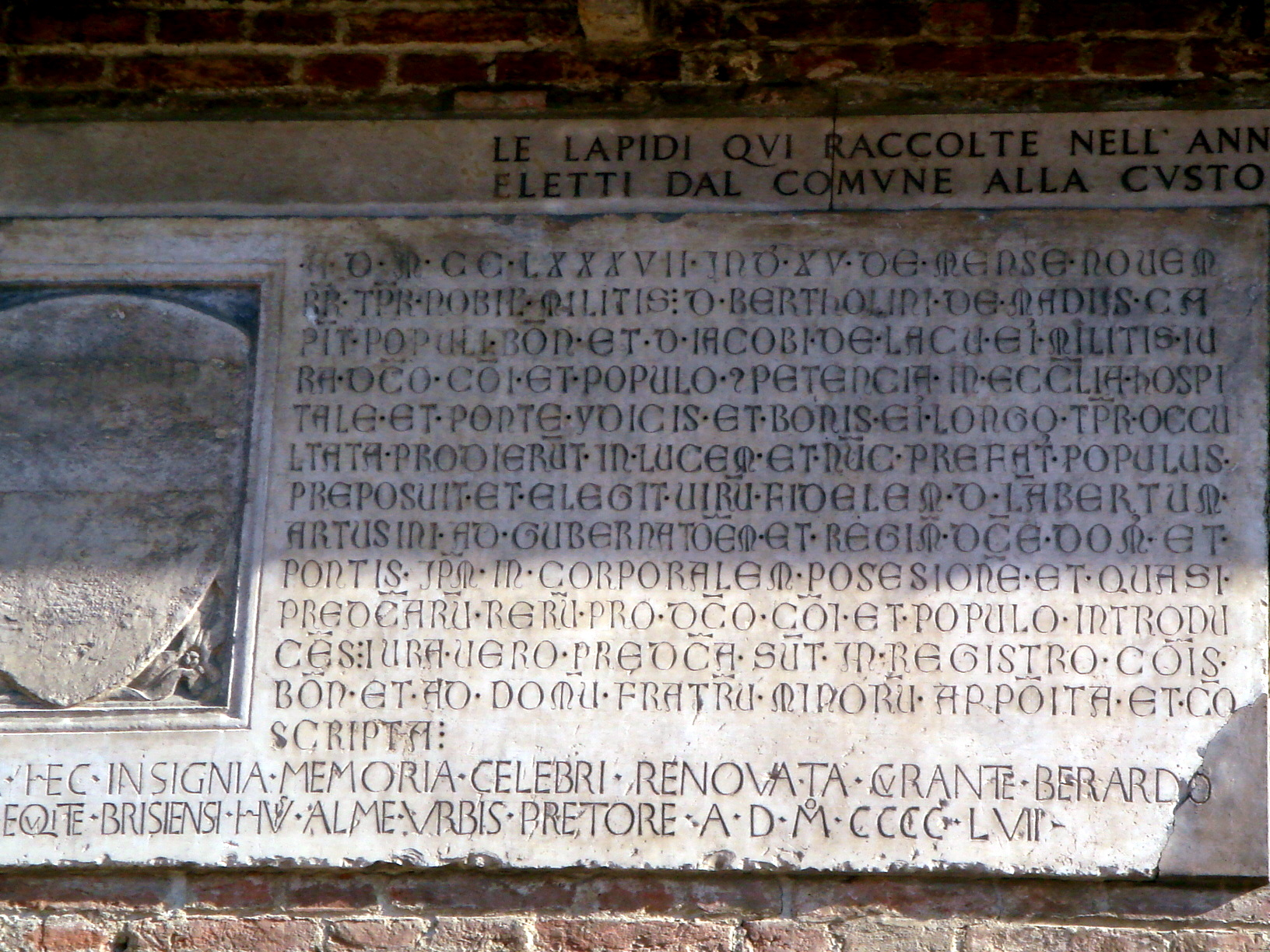
A replica, sculpted in 1457, of the ancient plaque commemorating the election of Lamberto Artusini in 1287. It stands along the facade of the Palazzo di re Enzo in Piazza Maggiore square in Bologna, Italy. Source: Giovanni Dall’Orto

An incomplete list of events in 1287 in Italy:

- The naval Battle of the Counts

== Births ==
- Robert III of Artois (1287–1342)

== Deaths ==
- Honorius IV (1210–1287)
