= 1107 in Italy =

- Decades
- See also: History of Italy; Timeline of Italian history; List of years in Italy

Events during the year 1107 in Italy.

== Deaths ==
- Robert I of Loritello

== Births ==
- Enrico Dandolo
