= 1300 in Italy =

| List of years in Italy |
- … 1290; 1291; 1292; 1293; 1294; 1295; 1296; 1297; 1298; 1299; 1300; 1301; 1302; 1303; 1304; 1305; 1306; 1307; 1308; 1309; 1310 …
- Art; Archaeology; Architecture; Literature; Music; Philosophy; Science; +...

Events which occurred in Italy or Italian territory in 1300:

== Political and military events ==
- Battle of Ponza (1300) was a naval battle that occurred on 14 June 1300 near the islands of Ponza and Zannone, in the Gulf of Gaeta (NW of Naples), when a galley fleet commanded by Roger of Lauria defeated an Aragonese-Sicilian galley fleet commanded by Conrad d'Oria.
- Sack of Lucera by a Christian army under the command of Charles II of Naples; the Muslim inhabitants were killed or sold into slavery.

== Arts ==
Duccio paints Stoclet Madonna

== Religion ==
- February 22 – The Jubilee of Pope Boniface VIII is celebrated.

== Births ==
- Birth of Taddeo Gaddi, painter and architect.

== Deaths ==
- August 29 – Guido Cavalcanti, poet (born 1250)
- December 12 – Bartolo da San Gimignano, Italian beatified Catholic priest, member of Third Order of Saint Francis (born 1228)
