= 1104 in Italy =

- Decades
- See also: History of Italy; Timeline of Italian history; List of years in Italy

Events during the year 1104 in Italy.

== Events ==
- Venetian Arsenal founded.
