= 1108 in Italy =

- Decades
- See also: History of Italy; Timeline of Italian history; List of years in Italy

Events during the year 1108 in Italy.

== Events ==
- Bergamo is first mentioned as an independent republic.

== Deaths ==
- Enrico Contarini
- Gregory III, Count of Tusculum

== Sources ==
- Batty, Elizabeth Frances (1820). Italian Scenery: From Drawings Made in 1817. Rodwell & Martin. p. 169.
- Cheney, David M. (21 August 2013). "Bishop Enrico Contarini". Catholic Hierarchy.
- Nicol, Donald M. (1992-05-07). Byzantium and Venice: A Study in Diplomatic and Cultural Relations. Cambridge University Press. ISBN 978-0-521-42894-1.
- Ross, Kelley L. (2012). "Patriarchs of Aquileia, Grado, and Venice".
- "Venice". Catholic Encyclopedia. New York: Robert Appleton Company.
