= 1101 in Italy =

- Decades
- See also: History of Italy; Timeline of Italian history; List of years in Italy

Events during the year 1101 in Italy.

== Deaths ==
- Roger I of Sicily
- Walter of Albano
- Anselm IV (archbishop of Milan)

== Sources ==
- Barlow, Frank (1988). The Feudal Kingdom of England 1042–1216 (Fourth ed.). New York: Longman. ISBN 0-582-49504-0.
- Barlow, Frank (1983). William Rufus. Berkeley: University of California Press. ISBN 0-520-04936-5.
- Cantor, Norman F. (1958). Church, Kingship, and Lay Investiture in England 1089–1135. Princeton, NJ: Princeton University Press. OCLC 186158828.
- Mason, Emma (2005). William II: Rufus, the Red King. Stroud: Tempus. ISBN 0-7524-3528-0.
- Robinson, Ian Stuart (1990). The Papacy, 1073–1198: Continuity and Innovation. Cambridge, UK: Cambridge University Press. ISBN 0-521-31922-6.
- Southern, R. W. (1990). Saint Anselm: A Portrait in a Landscape. Cambridge: Cambridge University Press. ISBN 0-521-36262-8.
- Vaughn, Sally N. (1987). Anselm of Bec and Robert of Meulan: The Innocence of the Dove and the Wisdom of the Serpent. Berkeley: University of California Press. ISBN 0-520-05674-4.
- Landolfo Iuniore di San Paolo. Historia Mediolanensis.
- Ghisalberti, Alberto M. Dizionario Biografico degli Italiani: III Ammirato – Arcoleo. Rome, 1961.
