= 1102 in Italy =

- Decades
- See also: History of Italy; Timeline of Italian history; List of years in Italy

Events during the year 1102 in Italy.

== Deaths ==
- Antipope Theodoric
- Antipope Adalbert
- Henry, Count of Monte Sant'Angelo
- Vital I Michele
- Pope Michael IV of Alexandria

== Sources ==
- Chalandon, Ferdinand. Histoire de la domination normande en Italie et en Sicile. Paris, 1907.
- Caravale, Mario (ed). Dizionario Biografico degli Italiani LXII Dugoni – Enza. Rome, 1993.
- Jahn, W. Unersuchungen zur normannischen Herrschaftsbildung in Süditalien (1040–1100). Phil. Diss. Munich, 1988.
