= 1103 in Italy =

- Decades
- See also: History of Italy; Timeline of Italian history; List of years in Italy

Events during the year 1103 in Italy.

== Deaths ==
- Humbert II, Count of Savoy
- Sybilla of Conversano

== Sources ==
- Detlev Schwennicke, Europäische Stammtafeln: Stammtafeln zur Geschichte der Europäischen Staaten, Neue Folge, Band II (Marburg, Germany: Verlag von J. A. Stargardt, 1984), Tafel 81
- Charles Wendell David, Robert Curthose, Duke of Normandy (Cambridge, MA: Harvard University Press, 1920), p. 146 ISBN 1-4326-9296-8
- William M. Aird, Robert Curthose Duke of Normandy (Woodbridge: The Boydell Press, 2008), pp. 191–2
- François Neveux, The Normans, Trans. Howard Curtis (London: Constable & Robinson, Ltd., 2008), p. 174
- Ordericus Vitalis, The Ecclesiastical History of England and Normandy, Trans. Thomas Forester, Vol. III (London: Henry G. Bohn, 1854), p. 272
- C. Warren Hollister, Henry I (Yale University Press, New Haven & London, 2003), p. 180
- William M. Aird, Robert Curthose Duke of Normandy (Woodbridge: The Boydell Press, 2008), p. 212
- William M. Aird, Robert Curthose Duke of Normandy (Woodbridge: The Boydell Press, 2008), p. 213
- Katherine Lack, Conqueror's Son: Duke Robert Curthose, Thwarted King (Sutton Publishing, 2007), p. 153 ISBN 978-0-7509-4566-0
