= 1189 in Italy =

- Decades
- See also: History of Italy; Timeline of Italian history; List of years in Italy

Events during the year 1189 in Italy.

== Events ==
- Tancred, Count of Lecce is elected by Norman officials as new King of Sicily instead of the designated heiress Constance and is supported by Matthew d'Ajello and Pope Clement III.

== Deaths ==
- 18 November – King William II of Sicily
