= 1190 in Italy =

- Decades
- See also: History of Italy; Timeline of Italian history; List of years in Italy

Events taking place the year 1190 in Italy.

== Deaths ==
- Roger of Andria, a supporter of Henry VI, Holy Roman Emperor and himself a former contender for the Sicilian throne against Tancred, King of Sicily.
