= 1100 in Italy =

- Decades
- See also: History of Italy; Timeline of Italian history; List of years in Italy

Events during the year 1100 in Italy.

- Distillation of liquor is estimated to have been invented in Italy around the year 1100.

== Deaths ==
- Antipope Clement III
- William IV, Marquess of Montferrat

== Births ==
- Enrico Dandolo (patriarch)
- John of Meda

== Sources ==
- Herbermann, Charles, ed. (1913). "Pope St. Gregory VII" . Catholic Encyclopedia. New York: Robert Appleton Company.
- Herbermann, Charles, ed. (1913). "Henry IV (2)" . Catholic Encyclopedia. New York: Robert Appleton Company.
- Herbermann, Charles, ed. (1913). "Matilda of Canossa" . Catholic Encyclopedia. New York: Robert Appleton Company.
- Herbermann, Charles, ed. (1913). "Conflict of Investitures" . Catholic Encyclopedia. New York: Robert Appleton Company.
- Coulombe, Charles A., Vicars of Christ: A History of the Popes, (Kensington Publishing Corp.
- Caravale, Mario (ed). Dizionario Biografico degli Italiani: LX Grosso – Guglielmo da Forlì. Rome, 2003.
- Marchesi di Monferrato: Guglielmo IV.
- Carraro, Silvia (2012). "Tra sacro e quotidiano. Il monachesimo femminile nella laguna di Venezia in epoca medievale (secoli IX-XIV)" (PDF).
- Dale, Thomas E. A. (1997). Relics, Prayer, and Politics in Medieval Venetia: Romanesque Painting in the Crypt of Aquileia Cathedral. Princeton University Press. ISBN 978-0-691-01175-2.
- Jackson, Sir Thomas Graham (1887). Dalmatia, the Quarnero and Istria, with Cettigne in Montenegro and the island of Grado. Clarendon press. p. 386.
- Madden, Thomas F. (2008-04-01). Enrico Dandolo and the Rise of Venice. JHU Press. ISBN 978-0-8018-9184-7.
- Madden, Thomas F. (2012-10-25). Venice: A New History. Penguin Group US. ISBN 978-1-101-60113-6.
- Muir, Edward (1981). Civic Ritual in Renaissance Venice. Princeton University Press. ISBN 978-0-691-10200-9.
- Riley-Smith, Jonathan (25 July 2011). "The Venetian Crusade of 1122-1124". medievalists.net.
- Sandi, Vettor (1755). Principj di storia civile della repubblica di Venezia dalla sua fondazione sino all'anno 1700. - Venezia, Coletti 1755-1756. Coletti.
- Schulz, Juergen (2004). The New Palaces of Medieval Venice. Penn State Press. ISBN 978-0-271-04836-9.
- Setton, Kenneth M.; Zacour, Norman P.; Hazard, Harry W. (1985-09-01). A History of the Crusades: The Impact of the Crusades on the Near East. Univ of Wisconsin Press. ISBN 978-0-299-09144-6.
