= 1191 in Italy =

- Decades
- See also: History of Italy; Timeline of Italian history; List of years in Italy

Events during the year 1191 in Italy.

== Events ==
- In August, Sicilians defeat an invasion of Henry VI, Holy Roman Emperor; Empress Constance is captured and later imprisoned at Castel dell'Ovo at Naples.
