= 1176 in Italy =

- Decades
- See also: History of Italy; Timeline of Italian history; List of years in Italy

Events during the year 1176 in Italy.

== Events ==
- May 29 – Battle of Legnano: Frederick I, Holy Roman Emperor, is defeated by the Lombard League, leading to the pactum Anagninum (the Agreement of Anagni).

== Deaths ==
- Galdino della Sala (1096–1176) - Saint Galdinus
