= 1339 in Italy =

| List of years in Italy |
- … 1329; 1330; 1331; 1332; 1333; 1334; 1335; 1336; 1337; 1338; 1339; 1340; 1341; 1342; 1343; 1344; 1345; 1346; 1347; 1348; 1349 …
- Art; Archaeology; Architecture; Literature; Music; Philosophy; Science; +...

An incomplete series of events which happened in Italy in 1339:

- Battle of Parabiago
- Beginning of the Hundred Years' War (1339–1453)

== Births ==
- Alexander V (Petros Philarges, 1339–1410) - antipope 1409-1410

== Deaths ==
- Azzone I Visconti (1302–1339), Signore di Milano (1329–1339)
