= 1237 in Italy =

- Years in Italy: 1234 1235 1236 1237 1238 1239 1240
- Centuries: 12th century · 13th century · 14th century
- Decades: 1200s 1210s 1220s 1230s 1240s 1250s 1260s
- Years: 1234 1235 1236 1237 1238 1239 1240

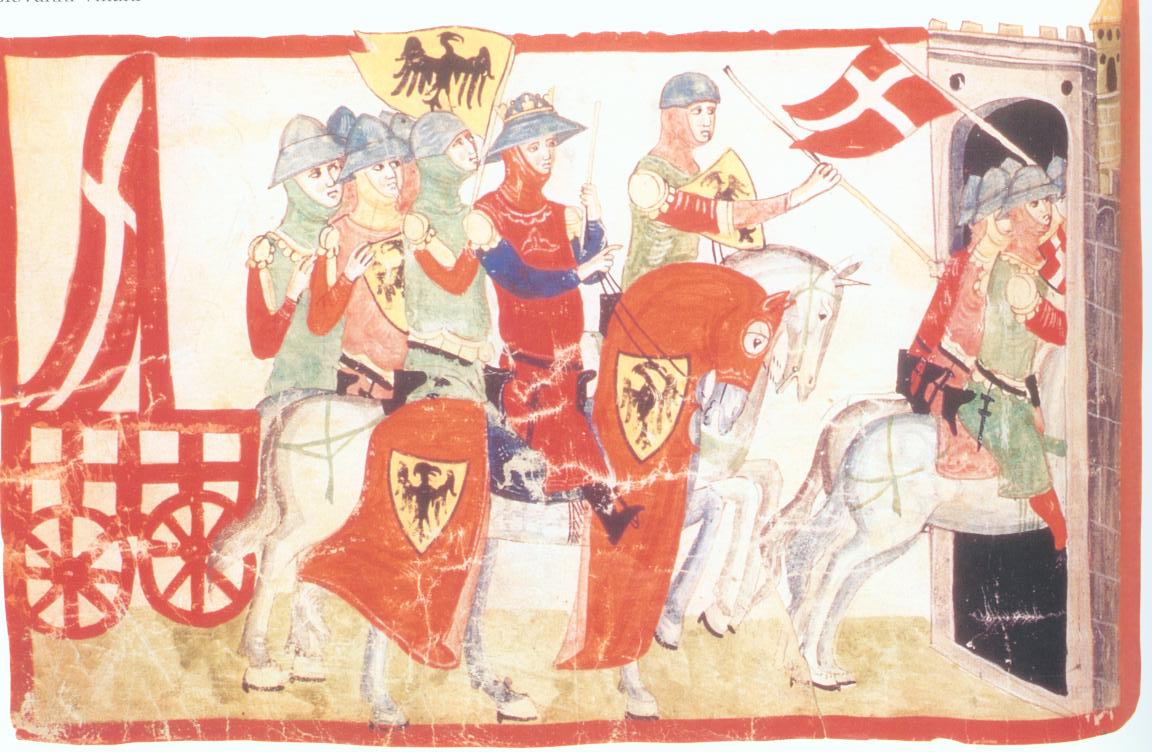
Giovanni Villani's illustration shows the capture of the Milanese Carroccio after the Battle of Cortenuova in 1237.

Events in Italy in 1237:

== Events ==
- Battle of Cortenuova
- Gualdo Tadino is destroyed by fire

== Deaths ==
- Villanus
