= 1972 in Italy =

- Decades: 1950s; 1960s; 1970s; 1980s; 1990s
- See also: History of Italy; Timeline of Italian history; List of years in Italy

Events in the year 1972 in Italy.

== Incumbents ==
- President - Giovanni Leone
- Prime Minister – Emilio Colombo (until 17 February); Giulio Andreotti (from 17 February)

== Events ==
- 7 May – In the 1972 Italian general election, the Christian Democracy Party (DC) retains its position with around 38% of the votes
- 21 August – 3 September – 33rd Venice International Film Festival

=== Sport ===
==== Basketball ====
- 1971–72 Serie A (basketball)
- 1972–73 Serie A (basketball)

==== Cycling ====
- 1972 Giro d'Italia
- 1972 UCI Road World Championships

==== Football ====
- 1971–72 Serie A
- 1972–73 Serie A
- 1971–72 Serie B
- 1972–73 Serie B

==== Motor racing ====
- 1972 Italian Grand Prix

== Births ==
- 29 February
  - Antonio Sabàto, Jr., Italian actor
  - Sylvie Lubamba, Italian showgirl
- 6 June – Cristina Scabbia, singer
- 12 July – Gabriel Garko, actor and fashion model
- 8 September – Giovanni Frezza, actor
- 21 October – Ilaria Latini, voice actress
- 21 November – Maria Cristina Correnti, basketball player
- Date unknown

== Deaths ==
- 2 January – Mauro Scoccimarro, economist and politician (born 1895)
- 29 February – Pietro Ubaldi, author, teacher and philosopher (born 1886)
- 11 August – Teresa Franchini, actress (born 1877)

== See also ==
- 1972 in Italian television
- List of Italian films of 1972
