= 1156 in Italy =

- Decades
- See also: History of Italy; Timeline of Italian history; List of years in Italy

Events during the year 1156 in Italy.

== Events ==
- Treaty of Benevento - The Treaty of Benevento was an important treaty between the papacy of Adrian IV and the Norman Kingdom of Sicily. After years of turbulent relations, the popes finally settled down to a peace with the Hauteville kings.
- The events in 1156 left the pope alone in opposition to the Normans. The army of Michael Palaeologus had been annihilated, the army of Frederick Barbarossa had returned to Germany, and the internal rebels against royal authority in Apulia, men like Robert II of Capua or Richard II of Aquila, had either reconciled or been imprisoned. In short, the pope had no support to continue hostilities. He was also barred from Rome by the populace. He was staying at Benevento, which had been papal territory for over a century. The Sicilian army approached Benevento and the pope was forced to make terms.
- Bari razed by the Sicilians.

== Births ==
- Bona of Pisa (c. 1156-1207) - Saint Bona, patron saint of travellers
