= 1192 in Italy =

- Decades
- See also: History of Italy; Timeline of Italian history; List of years in Italy

Events during the year 1192 in Italy.

== Events ==
- Empress Constance, captured by the Sicilians in 1191, is released under the pressure of the Pope, and returns to Germany.
