= 1158 in Italy =

- Decades
- See also: History of Italy; Timeline of Italian history; List of years in Italy

Events during the year 1158 in Italy.

== Events ==
- In June 1158, Emperor Frederick Barbarossa set out upon his second Italian expedition. During this expedition:
  - The Diet of Roncaglia near Piacenza was first convoked by Frederick Barbarossa.
  - The University of Bologna, the oldest continually operating university in the world, was granted its first privileges by the Emperor.

== Deaths ==
- Geoffrey VI, Count of Anjou (1134–1158)
