= 1325 in Italy =

- Years in Italy: 1322 1323 1324 1325 1326 1327 1328
- Centuries: 13th century · 14th century · 15th century
- Decades: 1290s 1300s 1310s 1320s 1330s 1340s 1350s
- Years: 1322 1323 1324 1325 1326 1327 1328

A list of events in 1325 in Italy:

- Battle of Altopascio

The Battle of Altopascio was a battle fought in 1325 in Tuscany, between the Ghibelline forces of Castruccio Castracani and the Guelph ones of the Republic of Florence.

== Births ==
- Pandolfo II Malatesta, condottiere
