= 1364 in Italy =

List of years in Italy
- … 1354; 1355; 1356; 1357; 1358; 1359; 1360; 1361; 1362; 1363; 1364; 1365; 1366; 1367; 1368; 1369; 1370; 1371; 1372; 1373; 1374 …
- Art; Archaeology; Architecture; Literature; Music; Philosophy; Science; +...

A series of events, births and deaths in AD 1364 in Italy:

- Battle of Cascina

== Births ==
Niccolò de' Niccoli

== Deaths ==
Lodrisio Visconti
