= 1167 in Italy =

- Decades
- See also: History of Italy; Timeline of Italian history; List of years in Italy

Events during the year 1167 in Italy.

== Events ==
- Battle of Monte Porzio - The Battle of Monte Porzio or Battle of Tusculum was fought on 29 May 1167, Whit Sunday, between the Holy Roman Empire and the city of Rome between a small hill outside the city of Tusculum and the city walls, at a place called "Prataporci", about 15 miles southeast of Rome. In the historical book Chronica Universalis, Sicardo wrote about the site of battle:...apud Montem Portium.
- The army of the "Commune of Rome", called the "greatest army which Rome had sent into the field in centuries" was defeated by the forces of the Holy Roman Emperor Frederick Barbarossa and the local princes of Tusculum and Albano.

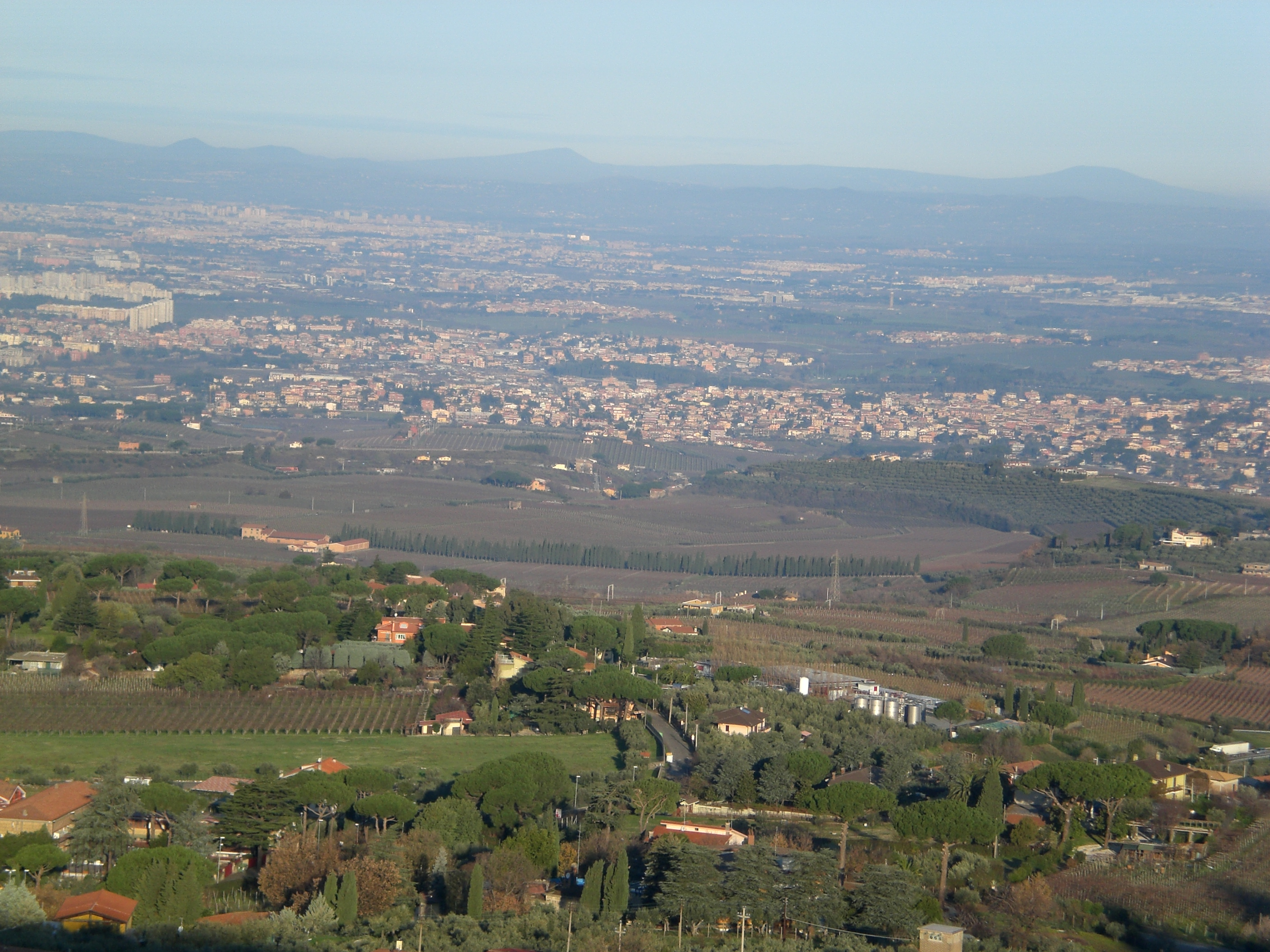
Prataporci site, where the battle took place, view from Monte Porzio Catone

== Deaths ==
- Avraham Ibn Ezra (c.1093–1167) - poet
- Rainald of Dassel (1120–1167) - archbishop of Cologne, archchancellor of Italy
