= 1241 in Italy =

- Years in Italy: 1238 1239 1240 1241 1242 1243 1244
- Centuries: 12th century · 13th century · 14th century
- Decades: 1210s 1220s 1230s 1240s 1250s 1260s 1270s
- Years: 1238 1239 1240 1241 1242 1243 1244

An incomplete list of events in Italy in 1241:

- Battle of Meloria (1241)

The first Battle of Meloria took place on 3 May 1241 near Meloria islet, off Livorno, Italy. It was fought between the fleet of the emperor Frederick II, called Stupor Mundi, in alliance with Pisa, against a Genoese squadron bringing a number of English, French and Spanish prelates to attend the council summoned to meet at the Lateran by Pope Gregory IX. Three Genoese galleys were sunk and twenty-two taken. Several of the prelates perished, and many were carried prisoners to the camp of the emperor.
