= 1951 in Italy =

- Decades: 1930s; 1940s; 1950s; 1960s; 1970s
- See also: History of Italy; Timeline of Italian history; List of years in Italy

Events from the year 1951 in Italy.

== Incumbents ==
- President – Luigi Einaudi
- Prime Minister – Alcide De Gasperi

== Events ==
- 20 January – Winter of Terror: Avalanches in the Alps causes 240 deaths and 45,000 deaths in Switzerland, Austria, and Italy.
- 29–31 January – The first edition of the Sanremo Music Festival took place at the Casino Municipale in Sanremo, Italy.
- 21 October – A storm in southern Italy has resulted in the death of over 100 people.
- 20 November – The Po River is experiencing flooding in northern Italy.
- 24 December – Libya gained independence from Italy, and Idris I was proclaimed as its new King.

== Births ==
- 16 July – Franco Serantini, Italian anarchist (d. 1972)
- 22 October – Claudio Ranieri, Italian football manager and player

== Deaths ==
- 13 January – Francesco Marchetti Selvaggiani, Italian Roman Catholic cardinal and eminence (b. 1871)
- 28 January – Petar Dujam Munzani, Italian Roman Catholic archbishop and reverend (b. 1890)
- 28 February – Giannina Russ, Italian soprano (b. 1873)
- 2 March – Cassiano Conzatti, Italian botanist, explorer and pteridologist (b. 1862)
- 20 April – Ivanoe Bonomi, Italian politician and statesman, 25th prime minister of Italy (b. 1873)
- 23 May – Antonio Gandusio, Italian actor (b. 1875)
- 29 May – Antonio Mosca, Italian painter (b. 1870)
- 28 June – Maria Pia Mastena, Italian Roman Catholic religious sister and blessed (b. 1881)
- 18 July – Ludovico di Caporiacco, Italian arachnologist (b. 1901)
- 3 September – Enrico Valtorta, Italian Roman Catholic bishop of Hong Kong and reverend (b. 1883)
- 10 September – Giuseppe Mulè, Italian composer and conductor (b. 1885)
- 9 November – Luigi Beltrame Quattrocchi, Italian Roman Catholic layman and blessed (b. 1880)
- 23 November – Enrichetta Alfieri, Italian Roman Catholic religious professed and blessed (b. 1891)
- 19 December – Umberto Cassuto, Italian rabbi and biblical scholar (b. 1883)
- 24 December – Raffaele Rossetti, Italian engineer and military naval officer (b. 1881)
