= 1215 in Italy =

An incomplete list of events in 1215 in Italy:

== Events ==
- Fourth Council of the Lateran
- Manfred III of Saluzzo begins reign as Margrave of Saluzzo

== Deaths ==
- Jacopino della Scala
- Manfred II, Marquess of Saluzzo
- Sicard of Cremona
- Jacopino della Scala

== Births ==
- (Disputed) — Pope St. Celestine V, pope between July and December 1294, last pope not elected through a papal conclave.
