= Maria Cristina Correnti =

Italian basketball player (born 1972)

Maria Cristina Correnti (born 21 November 1972 in Messina) is an Italian former basketball player.
