= 1266 in Italy =

Events (incomplete) which happened on the Italian peninsula in 1266:

== Events ==
- 26 February – The Battle of Benevento occurs between the Guelph and Ghibelline factions. The Guelph faction wins a decisive victory, leading to the death of the King of Sicily, Manfred, and the end of Hohenstaufen rule over the Kingdom.

== Deaths ==
- 26 February – Manfred, King of Sicily
