= 1315 in Italy =

An incomplete list of events which occurred in Italy in 1315:

== Events ==
- Battle of Montecatini

== Deaths ==
- Andrea Dotti (saint)
