= 1248 in Italy =

An incomplete list of events in Italy in 1248:

== Events ==
- Battle of Parma
- University of Piacenza recognized as a university
- Viam agnoscere veritatis (1248)

== Deaths ==
- Taddeo da Suessa, jurist

== Births ==
- Angela of Foligno
