= 1132 in Italy =

An incomplete list of events in 1132 in Italy:

- The Battle of Nocera or Scafati was the first major battle of Roger II of Sicily and one of two of his major defeats, at the hands of Count Ranulf of Alife.
- Construction of Cappella Palatina in Palermo begins
- Sicilian monarchy founded by Norman king Roger II.
