= 1179 in Italy =

The following events occurred in Italy in the year 1179.

== Events ==
- Third Council of the Lateran

The Third Council of the Lateran met in March 1179 as the eleventh ecumenical council. Pope Alexander III presided and 302 bishops attended.

By agreement reached at the Peace of Venice in 1177 the bitter conflict between Alexander III and Emperor Frederick I was brought to an end. When Pope Hadrian IV died in 1159, the divided cardinals elected two popes: Roland of Siena, who took the name of Alexander III, and Octavian of Rome who, though nominated by fewer cardinals, was supported by Frederick and assumed the name of Pope Victor IV. Frederick, wishing to remove all that stood in the way of his authority in Italy, declared war upon the Italian states and especially the Church which was enjoying great authority. A serious schism arose out of this conflict, and after Victor IV's death in 1164, two further antipopes were nominated in opposition to Alexander III: Paschal III (1164–1168) and Callistus III (1168–1178). Eventually, at the Peace of Venice, when Alexander gained victory, he promised Frederick that he would summon an ecumenical council.

- The Dialogus de Scaccario printed

== Deaths ==
- Hildegard of Bingen (1098–1179)
