= 1123 in Italy =

An incomplete list of events in Italy in 1123:

== Events ==
- First Council of the Lateran

The Council of 1123 is reckoned in the series of Ecumenical councils by the Catholic Church. It was convoked by Pope Callixtus II in December 1122, immediately after the Concordat of Worms. The Council sought to: (a) bring an end to the practice of the conferring of ecclesiastical benefices by people who were laymen (b) free the election of bishops and abbots from secular influence (c) clarify the separation of spiritual and temporal affairs (d) re-establish the principle that spiritual authority resides solely in the Church (e) abolish the claim of the emperors to influence papal elections.

The council convoked by Callistus II was significant in size: three hundred bishops and more than six hundred abbots assembled at Rome in March 1123; Callistus presided in person. During the Council the decisions of the Concordat of Worms were read and ratified. Various other decisions were promulgated.

- Pactum Warmundi treaty between the Crusader Kingdom of Jerusalem and the Republic of Venice signed

== Deaths ==
- Saint Peter of Pappacarbone (?-1123) abbot
- Saint Berardo (11th century – 19 December 1123) saint
- Bruno (Bishop of Segni) (c. 1047 – July 18, 1123) saint
