= 1268 in Italy =

A list of events which happened in 1268 in Italy:

== Events ==
- Battle of Tagliacozzo
- Papal election, 1268–71

== Births ==
- Agnes of Montepulciano
- Clare of Montefalco
- Ludovico I Gonzaga

== Deaths ==
- Pope Clement IV
- Barral of Baux
- Reniero Zeno
