= Villanus =

Saint Villanus

Bishop of Gubbio
- Born: Gubbio, Italy
- Died: 1237
- Venerated in: Roman Catholic Church
- Feast: 7 May

Villanus was a Benedictine Bishop of Gubbio. Born in Gubbio, Villanus entered religious life by entering the Benedictine monastery, at Fort-Avellana, before in 1206, being appointed Bishop of Gubbio.
