= 1260 in Italy =

An incomplete list of events in Italy in 1260:

- Battle of Montaperti, an important event which was fought on September 4, 1260, between Florence and Siena in Tuscany as part of the conflict between the Guelphs and Ghibellines. It gained notoriety for an act of treachery that turned the tide of the battle, which was immortalised by Dante Alighieri in his poem Divine Comedy.
- Jacobus de Voragine compiles his work, the Golden Legend, a late medieval best-seller.
- Nicola Pisano sculpts the pulpit in the Pisa Baptistery.
- The mosaic Christ between the Virgin and St Minias is made on the facade of Florence's Basilica di San Miniato al Monte.

== Deaths ==
- April 28 – Blessed Luchesio Modestini
- probable – Franciscus Accursius, Italian jurist
