= 1139 in Italy =

An incomplete list of events in 1139 in Italy:

- Second Council of the Lateran

The Second Council of the Lateran is believed to have been the Tenth Ecumenical Council by Roman Catholics. It was held by Pope Innocent II in April of the year, and was attended by close to a thousand clerics. Its immediate task was to neutralise the after-effects of the papal schism, which had arisen after the death of Pope Honorius II in February 1130 and the setting up of Petris Leonis as the antipope Anacletus II.

- Treaty of Mignano

The Treaty of Mignano of 1139 was the treaty which ended more than a decade of constant war in the Italian Mezzogiorno following the union of the mainland duchy of Apulia and Calabria with the County of Sicily in 1127. More significantly, in 1130, Antipope Anacletus II had crowned Roger II king.

The legitimate pope, Innocent II, did not recognise this title and many of Roger's peninsular vassals took exception to his exercising royal authority over them. Over the decade of the 1130s, Roger defeated his vassals one by one until in 1137, the Emperor Lothair II came down with the pope and conquered most of the south. Lothair's death deprived the southern barons of their support, however, and Roger quickly reconquered his territories and in 1139 the papal-imperial duke of Apulia, Ranulf of Alife, died.
