= 1137 in Italy =

Events in the year 1137 in Italy

== Events ==
Map showing the location of the Battle of Rignano.

- The Battle of Rignano was the second great defeat of the career of Roger II of Sicily and, like the first, the Battle of Nocera, it too came at the hands of Ranulf II, Count of Alife. The prime difference was the position of the two combatants.
- At Nocera on 24 July 1132, Ranulf was allied with Robert II of Capua and Sergius VII of Naples and he was a mere rebel, fighting the king of Sicily. On 30 October 1137, Ranulf was the recently appointed duke of Apulia, with a contingent of 800 German troops on loan from the Emperor Lothair II, and his adversaries were not only Roger, but his erstwhile ally Sergius.

== Deaths ==
- Antipope Gregory VIII (?-1137) - antipope 1118-1121
- Emperor Lothar II (1075–1137) - Holy Roman Emperor, died on return to Germany
- Sergius VII of Naples (?-1137) - last Duke of Naples
