= 1177 =

1177 in various calendars
- Gregorian calendar: 1177; MCLXXVII
- Ab urbe condita: 1930
- Armenian calendar: 626; ԹՎ ՈԻԶ
- Assyrian calendar: 5927
- Balinese saka calendar: 1098–1099
- Bengali calendar: 583–584
- Berber calendar: 2127
- English Regnal year: 23 Hen. 2 – 24 Hen. 2
- Buddhist calendar: 1721
- Burmese calendar: 539
- Byzantine calendar: 6685–6686
- Chinese calendar: 丙申年 (Fire Monkey); 3874 or 3667 — to — 丁酉年 (Fire Rooster); 3875 or 3668
- Coptic calendar: 893–894
- Discordian calendar: 2343
- Ethiopian calendar: 1169–1170
- Hebrew calendar: 4937–4938
- Hindu calendars
- Vikram Samvat: 1233–1234
- Shaka Samvat: 1098–1099
- Kali Yuga: 4277–4278
- Holocene calendar: 11177
- Igbo calendar: 177–178
- Iranian calendar: 555–556
- Islamic calendar: 572–573
- Japanese calendar: Angen 3 / Jishō 1 (治承元年)
- Javanese calendar: 1084–1085
- Julian calendar: 1177; MCLXXVII
- Korean calendar: 3510
- Minguo calendar: 735 before ROC 民前735年
- Nanakshahi calendar: −291
- Seleucid era: 1488/1489 AG
- Thai solar calendar: 1719–1720
- Tibetan calendar: མེ་ཕོ་སྤྲེ་ལོ་ (male Fire-Monkey); 1303 or 922 or 150 — to — མེ་མོ་བྱ་ལོ་ (female Fire-Bird); 1304 or 923 or 151

Year 1177 (MCLXXVII) was a common year starting on Saturday of the Julian calendar.

== Events ==
=== January–December ===
- January – Eystein Meyla, leader of the Birkebeiner in Norway, is killed. Sverre Sigurdson (Later, King Sverre I, of Norway) becomes the new leader.
- January 13 – Leopold V becomes Duke of Austria.
- March – Treaty of Venice: Frederick I Barbarossa acknowledges Alexander III as Pope, after a diplomatic mediation by Venetian doge Sebastiano Ziani.
- March 16 – The Spanish Award is signed and witnessed by, among others, Robert III de Stuteville and John of Greenford
- August 1 – The Holy Roman Empire renounces any claims on the territory of Rome.
- September 27 – Pope Alexander III sends a letter to Prester John, believing he is real.
- November 25 – Battle of Montgisard: Baldwin IV of Jerusalem and Raynald of Chatillon defeat Saladin.

=== Date unknown ===
- During the third year of the Angen era in Japan, a fire devastates Kyoto.
- During the winter, the Estonians attack Pskov.
- Casimir II overthrows his brother Mieszko III the Old, to become High Duke of Poland.
- The Cham sack the Khmer capital of Angkor. The date is disputed.
- Moscow is burned down by Gleb I, prince of Ryazan, and its inhabitants are killed.
- A civil war breaks out in the Republic of Florence, between the Uberti Family and their consular opponent.
- Puigcerdà is founded by Alfonso II of Aragon.
- Byland Abbey is established on its final site in Yorkshire, England, by the Cistercians.
- Abbas Benedictus becomes abbot of Peterborough in England.
- Roger de Moulins becomes Grand Master of the Knights Hospitaller.
- possible date – Richard FitzNeal begins to write his treatise Dialogus de Scaccario ("Dialogue concerning the Exchequer") in England.
- The union of Egypt and Syria under Sultan Saladin Yusuf ibn Ayyub, the foundation of the Ayyubid Sultanate.

== Births ==
- February/March – Philip of Swabia, rival of Otto IV, Holy Roman Emperor (d. 1208)
- August – Baldwin V, King of Jerusalem (d. 1186)
- Marie of Oignies, French beguin (d. 1213)
- Prithviraj Chauhan, Indian ruler of Ajmer (d. 1192)
- Sylvester Gozzolini, Italian founder of the Sylvestrines (d. 1267)

== Deaths ==
- January 13 – Henry II, Duke of Austria (b. 1107)
- January – Eystein Meyla, leader of the Birkebeiner in Norway. (b. 1157)
- June – William of Montferrat, Count of Jaffa and Ascalon, father of Baldwin V of Jerusalem (b. early 1140s)
- probable – Hugh Bigod, 1st Earl of Norfolk (b. 1095)
