= 1299 in Italy =

An incomplete list of events in 1299 in Italy:

- Battle of Cape Orlando

The naval Battle of Cape Orlando took place on 4 July 1299 at St Marco di Val Demone, north-western Sicily, when an Aragonese and Angevin galley fleet commanded by Roger of Lauria defeated a Sicilian galley fleet commanded by Conrad d'Oria. Both leaders, James II and Frederick III, were present. There was a small attack on 3 July also.

- Battle of Falconaria

The Battle of Falconaria (also La Falconara or Falconeria) was a battle of the latter days of the War of the Sicilian Vespers. Fought on 1 December 1299 between the forces of Frederick II of Sicily and Philip I of Taranto of the Kingdom of Naples, it was a momentous victory for Frederick and a disaster for Philip, who was captured.
