= 1284 in Italy =

An incomplete list of events in 1284 in Italy:

== Events ==
- Battle of the Gulf of Naples
- Battle of Meloria (1284)

== Births ==
- Simone Martini

== Deaths ==
- Nicola Pisano
