= 1283 in Italy =

An incomplete list of events which occurred in 1283 CE on the Italian peninsula.

== Births ==
- Galvano Fiamma

== Deaths ==
- Aldoino Filangieri di Candida
- Bonagratia de San Giovanni in Persiceto

== Events ==
- Battle of Malta
