= 1298 in Italy =

An incomplete series of events and deaths which occurred in Italy or to Italians in 1298:

== Events ==
- Battle of Curzola

== Deaths ==
- Jacobus de Voragine
- Guido I da Montefeltro
- John of Procida
- John of Genoa
- Aimery IV of Narbonne
