= 1285 in Italy =

Events in Italy in 1285:

== Events ==
- September 4 - Battle of Les Formiguestook place probably in the early morning of 4 September 1285 near Les Formigues Islands, about 85 km northeast of Barcelona, when a Catalan-Sicilian galley fleet commanded by Roger of Lauria defeated a French and Genoese galley fleet commanded by Guilhem de Lodeva, Henry di Mari, and John de Orrea.
- Rucellai Madonna painted for the Church of Santa Maria Novella in Florence
- Jacopo Savelli becomes Pope Honorius IV upon election, succeeding Pope Martin IV

== Deaths ==
- Charles I of Naples (1226–1285) - King of Sicily, Albania, and Naples; also known as Charles of Anjou
- Pope Martin IV (Simon de Brion, ?-1285)
- Philip I, Count of Savoy (1207–1285)
- Amadeus V, Count of Savoy (ca. 1250-1285) - Amadeus the Great, successor to his uncle Philip I
