= 1345 in Italy =

Some events which occurred in 1345 in Italy:

- Battle of Gamenario

The Battle of Gamenario, fought on 22 April, was a decisive battle of the wars between the Guelfs (Angevins) and Ghibellines (Lombards). It took place in north-west Italy in what is now part of the commune of Santena about 15 km southeast of Turin.

Reforza d'Agoult was sent in the spring of 1345 by Joan of Anjou, viceroy to northern Italy in hopes of putting an end to the war with the Margravate of Montferrat. Reforza conquered Alba and besieged Gamenario, a castle in the neighbourhood of Santena. Lombard Ghibellines formed an anti-Angevin alliance, headed by John II of Montferrat. On 22 April, he confronted Reforza d'Agoult and battle was joined. The meeting was brief and bloody. Initially uncertain, the outcome was a victory for the Ghibellines, who recovered the besieged fortress and dealt a severe blow to Angevin influence in Piedmont. To celebrate his victory, John built a new church in Asti in honour of Saint George, near whose feast day the battle was won. Saint George held a special place for the men of chivalry of the Medieval, because he was the Saint that killed the dragon and was therefore held in a warrior cult.

In the aftermath, Piedmont was partitioned between the victors. John received Alba, Acqui Terme, Ivrea, and Valenza. Luchino Visconti received Alessandria and the House of Savoy (related to the Palaiologos of Montferrat) received Chieri. The Angevins lost almost complete control of the region and many formerly French cities declared themselves independent. The defeat of the Angevins was also a defeat for Angevin-supported Manfred V of Saluzzo and the civil war in that margraviate was ended at Gamenario.

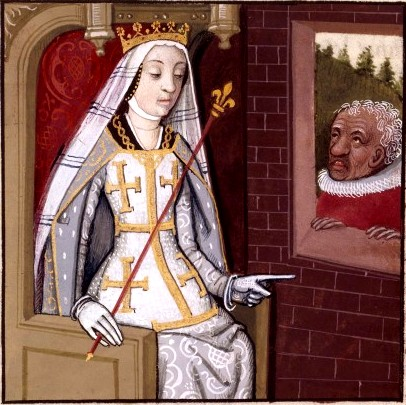
Joan I of Naples, possibly involved in an assassination in 1345

Andrew, Duke of Calabria, was assassinated by a conspiracy in 1345. He had been appointed joint heir with his wife, Joan I, to the throne of Naples by the Pope. This, however, sat ill with the Neapolitan people and nobles; nor was Joan content to share her sovereignty. With the approval of Pope Clement VI, Joan was crowned as sole monarch of Naples in August 1344. Fearing for his life, Andrew wrote to his mother Elizabeth that he would soon flee the kingdom. She intervened, and made a state visit; before she returned to Hungary, she bribed Pope Clement to reverse himself and permit the coronation of Andrew. She also gave a ring to Andrew, which was supposed to protect him from death by blade or poison, and returned with a false sense of security to Hungary.

Thus, in 1345, hearing of the Pope's reversal, a group of noble conspirators (probably including Queen Joan) determined to forestall Andrew's coronation. During a hunting trip at Aversa, Andrew left his room in the middle of the night and was set upon by the conspirators. A treacherous servant barred the door behind him; and as Joan cowered in their bed, a terrible struggle ensued, Andrew defending himself furiously and shrieking for aid. He was finally overpowered, strangled with a cord, and flung from a window. The horrible deed would taint the rest of Joan's reign.

Other events in Italy in 1345 include Ambrogio Lorenzetti's painting of a map of the world for the palace at Siena. The painting has since been lost, but the instruments which he used to make it still survive, giving insights into map-making techniques of the day. The Peruzzi family, a big banking family and precursor to the Medici family went bankrupt in 1345, and in 1345 Florence was the scene of an attempted strike by wool combers (ciompi). A few decades later they would rise in a full-scale revolt. In Verona, Mastino II della Scala began the construction of his Scaliger Tomb, an architectural structure still standing today.
