= 1289 in Italy =

Events from the year 1289 in Italy.

== Events ==
- 11 June – The Battle of Campaldino was fought between the Guelphs and Ghibellines.
