= 1302 in Italy =

An incomplete list of events in 1302 in Italy:

== Events ==
- Peace of Caltabellotta

== Births ==
- Andrew Corsini

== Deaths ==
- Cimabue
- Gerardo Bianchi
- Lotterio Filangieri
- Matthew of Aquasparta
