= 1116 =

1116 in various calendars
- Gregorian calendar: 1116; MCXVI
- Ab urbe condita: 1869
- Armenian calendar: 565; ԹՎ ՇԿԵ
- Assyrian calendar: 5866
- Balinese saka calendar: 1037–1038
- Bengali calendar: 522–523
- Berber calendar: 2066
- English Regnal year: 16 Hen. 1 – 17 Hen. 1
- Buddhist calendar: 1660
- Burmese calendar: 478
- Byzantine calendar: 6624–6625
- Chinese calendar: 乙未年 (Wood Goat); 3813 or 3606 — to — 丙申年 (Fire Monkey); 3814 or 3607
- Coptic calendar: 832–833
- Discordian calendar: 2282
- Ethiopian calendar: 1108–1109
- Hebrew calendar: 4876–4877
- Hindu calendars
- Vikram Samvat: 1172–1173
- Shaka Samvat: 1037–1038
- Kali Yuga: 4216–4217
- Holocene calendar: 11116
- Igbo calendar: 116–117
- Iranian calendar: 494–495
- Islamic calendar: 509–510
- Japanese calendar: Eikyū 4 (永久４年)
- Javanese calendar: 1021–1022
- Julian calendar: 1116; MCXVI
- Korean calendar: 3449
- Minguo calendar: 796 before ROC 民前796年
- Nanakshahi calendar: −352
- Seleucid era: 1427/1428 AG
- Thai solar calendar: 1658–1659
- Tibetan calendar: ཤིང་མོ་ལུག་ལོ་ (female Wood-Sheep); 1242 or 861 or 89 — to — མེ་ཕོ་སྤྲེ་ལོ་ (male Fire-Monkey); 1243 or 862 or 90

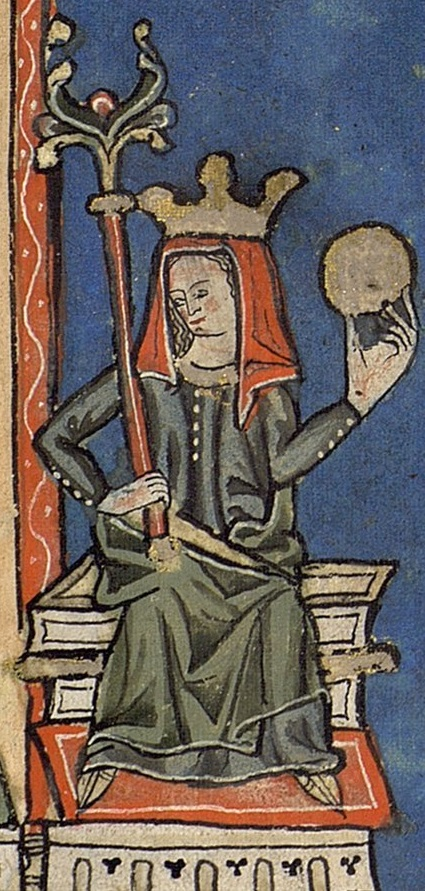
Theresa, Countess of Portugal (1080–1130)

Year 1116 (MCXVI) was a leap year starting on Saturday of the Julian calendar.

== Events ==
=== By place ===
==== Byzantine Empire ====
- Autumn – Battle of Philomelion (1116): Emperor Alexios I Komnenos leads an expedition into Anatolia and meets the Seljuk army under Sultan Malik Shah (near Philomelium). The Byzantines introduce a new battle formation of Alexios' devising, the parataxis (a defensive formation, consisting of a hollow square, with the baggage in the centre). During the battle, the Seljuk Turks mount several attacks on the formations, but all are repulsed. The Byzantine cavalry makes two counterattacks; the first is unsuccessful. But a second attack, led by Nikephoros Bryennios the Younger, breaks the Seljuk forces, who then turn to flight. The following day Malik Shah again attacks, his army completely surrounding the Byzantines from all sides. The Seljuk Turks are once more repulsed, with many losses. Alexios claims the victory, and Malik Shah is forced to accept a peace treaty, in which he promises to respect the frontiers of the Byzantine Empire.

==== Levant ====
- Summer – Crusaders under King Baldwin I of Jerusalem undertake an expedition to Egypt and march as far as Akaba on the Red Sea. After the local inhabitants flee from the town, Baldwin constructs castles in Akaba and on a nearby island. He leaves a garrison in both fortresses. The three Crusader strongholds – Montréal, Eilat, and Graye – secure the control of the caravan routes between Syria and Egypt.
- Autumn – Baldwin I hastens to Tyre (modern Lebanon) and begins the construction of a new fortress, known as Scandelion Castle, at the Ladder of Tyre, which completes the blockade of the town from the mainland.

==== Europe ====
- February 3 – Coloman, King of Hungary ("the Learned") dies after a 21-year reign in which he has consolidated the feudal system in Hungary and expanded the frontier (partly by overthrowing Petar Snačić, king of Croatia).
- Ramon Berenguer III, Count of Barcelona ("the Great"), sails to Rome in an effort to gain support from the Italian states and a licence from Pope Paschal II for his crusade against the Moors in Spain.
- July 15 – Ordelafo Faliero, doge of Venice, defeats Hungarian troops under King Stephen II, who have arrived to relieve Zadar; the remaining towns of Dalmatia surrender to Venice.
- The settlement of Malamocco on the Venice Lido is submerged as a result of an exceptional storm surge.
- Portuguese forces under Countess Theresa take two Galician cities, Tui and Ourense. In reply, the sister of Theresa, Queen Urraca ("the Reckless"), attacks Portugal.
- Almoravid troops conquer the Balearic Islands, whose Moorish rulers have been severely weakened by Pisan and Catalan raiders.

==== Wales ====
- The Welsh under King Gruffydd ap Rhys of Deheubarth attack Llandovery Castle, but are defeated. Gruffydd also attacks Swansea Castle and destroys the outer walls.

==== Africa ====
- The Zirid ruler of Ifriqiya, Ali ibn Yahya, conquers the island of Jerba, then acting as an independent piratical republic.

=== By topic ===
==== Art and Music ====
- Aak music is introduced to the Korean court, through a large gift of 428 musical instruments as well as 572 costumes and ritual dance objects from China, by Emperor Huizong of the Song dynasty.

==== Religion ====
- Construction starts on the Chennakeshava Temple (located on the Yagachi River) commissioned by King Vishnuvardhana at Belur in India.
- The monastery and cathedral at Peterborough in England are destroyed by fire.

== Births ==
(some dates approximate)

- April 12 – Richeza of Poland, queen consort of Sweden (d. 1156)
- August 29 – Philip of France, king of France (d. 1131)
- November 23 – William FitzRobert, 2nd Earl of Gloucester (d. 1183)
- Berengaria of Barcelona, queen consort of León and Castile (d. 1149)
- Ibn Saad al-Khair al-Balancy, Arab Andalusian linguist and poet (d. 1175)
- Ibn al-Azraq al-Fariqi, Arab historian and writer (d. 1176)
- Ibn al-Jawzi, Arab historian and philologist (d. 1201)
- Ibn Mada', Arab scholar and polymath (d. 1196)
- Roger de Clare, 2nd Earl of Hertford, Anglo-Norman noble (d. 1173)
- Ruaidrí Ua Conchobair, Irish king of Connacht (d. 1198)

== Deaths ==
(some dates approximate)

- February 3 – Coloman ("the Learned"), king of Hungary
- February 13 – Galon (or Gallo), bishop of Beauvais
- Abu Nasr Farsi, Persian statesman and poet (or 1117)
- Bagrat Pakrad, Armenian nobleman and adventurer
- Jimena Díaz, Spanish noblewoman
- Malik Shah, Seljuk ruler of the Sultanate of Rum
- Mary of Scotland, countess of Boulogne (b. 1082)
- Robert of Arbrissel, founder of Fontevrault Abbey
