= 1112 =

1112 in various calendars
- Gregorian calendar: 1112; MCXII
- Ab urbe condita: 1865
- Armenian calendar: 561; ԹՎ ՇԿԱ
- Assyrian calendar: 5862
- Balinese saka calendar: 1033–1034
- Bengali calendar: 518–519
- Berber calendar: 2062
- English Regnal year: 12 Hen. 1 – 13 Hen. 1
- Buddhist calendar: 1656
- Burmese calendar: 474
- Byzantine calendar: 6620–6621
- Chinese calendar: 辛卯年 (Metal Rabbit); 3809 or 3602 — to — 壬辰年 (Water Dragon); 3810 or 3603
- Coptic calendar: 828–829
- Discordian calendar: 2278
- Ethiopian calendar: 1104–1105
- Hebrew calendar: 4872–4873
- Hindu calendars
- Vikram Samvat: 1168–1169
- Shaka Samvat: 1033–1034
- Kali Yuga: 4212–4213
- Holocene calendar: 11112
- Igbo calendar: 112–113
- Iranian calendar: 490–491
- Islamic calendar: 505–506
- Japanese calendar: Ten'ei 3 (天永３年)
- Javanese calendar: 1017–1018
- Julian calendar: 1112; MCXII
- Korean calendar: 3445
- Minguo calendar: 800 before ROC 民前800年
- Nanakshahi calendar: −356
- Seleucid era: 1423/1424 AG
- Thai solar calendar: 1654–1655
- Tibetan calendar: ལྕགས་མོ་ཡོས་ལོ་ (female Iron-Hare); 1238 or 857 or 85 — to — ཆུ་ཕོ་འབྲུག་ལོ་ (male Water-Dragon); 1239 or 858 or 86

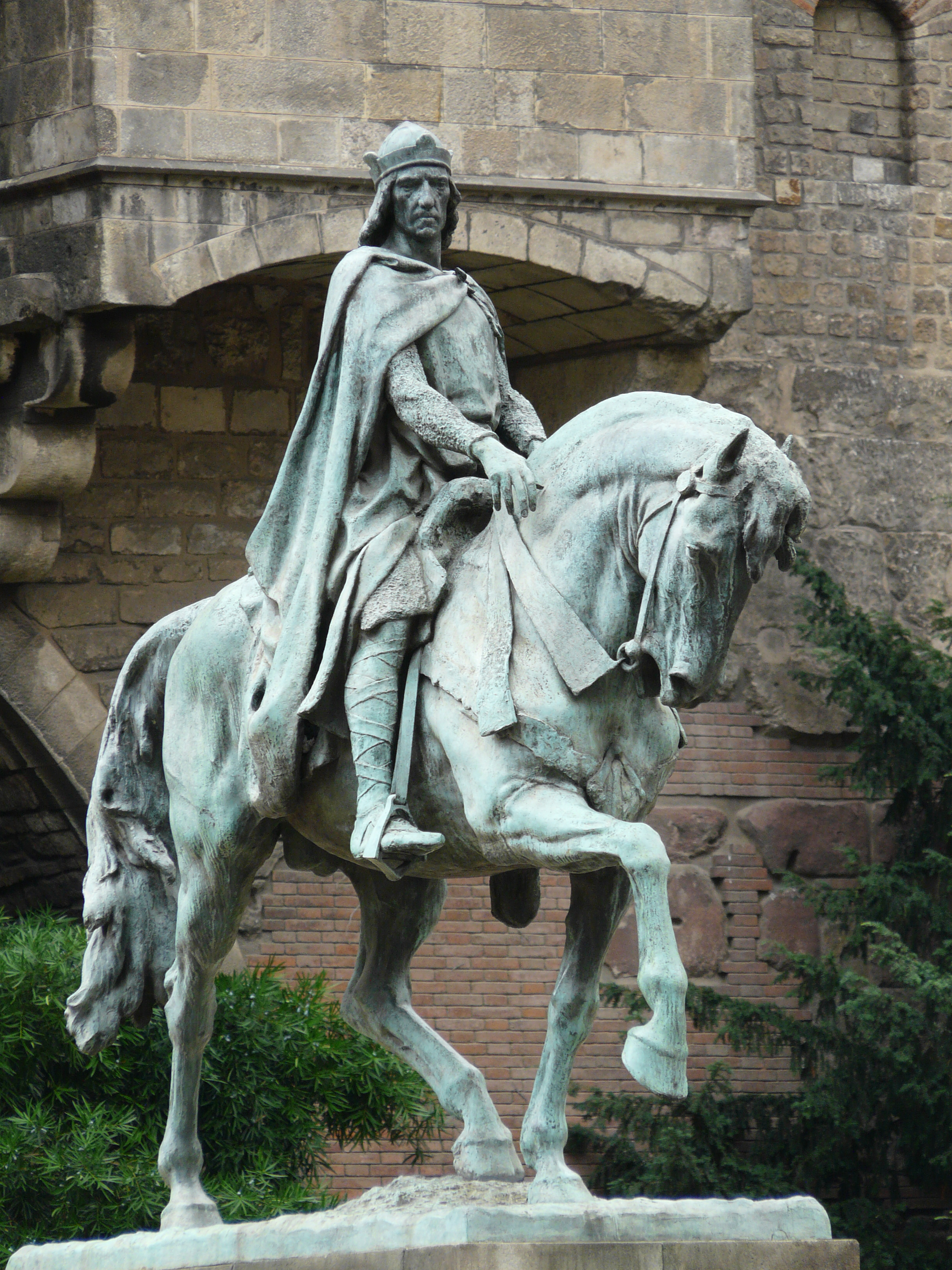
Count Ramon Berenguer III (1082–1131)

Year 1112 (MCXII) was a leap year starting on Monday of the Julian calendar.

== Events ==
=== By place ===
==== Byzantine Empire ====
- Spring – Malik Shah, Seljuk ruler of the Sultanate of Rum, begins incursions into Anatolia. He marches on Philadelphia with his army, but is halted by the Byzantines under Gabras, governor of the Theme of Chaldia.

==== Levant ====
- Spring – Seljuk forces under Toghtekin, Turkic governor of Damascus, intervene at Tyre, and force King Baldwin I of Jerusalem to raise the siege.
- April 10 – The Crusaders fight their way back to Acre (modern Israel).

==== Europe ====
- February 3 – Ramon Berenguer III ("the Great"), count of Barcelona, obtains the county of Provence through his marriage to the heiress, Douce I. Ramon's dominion stretches as far east as Nice (modern France).
- May 22 – Henry, Count of Portugal, dies from wounds received during a siege at Astorga. He is succeeded by his 3-year-old son Afonso I, but his mother Theresa desires to rule Portugal alone and becomes regent.
- Duke Bolesław III Wrymouth of Poland has his half-brother Zbigniew blinded and thrown into a dungeon in Tyniec Abbey. Archbishop Martin I excommunicates Bolesław for committing this terrible crime.
- Otto ("the Rich"), count of Ballenstedt, is appointed duke of Saxony by Emperor Henry V, but is later stripped of his title.
- Salzwedel in the Altmark (modern Germany) is founded.
- The Margraviate of Baden is founded by Herman II.

=== By topic ===
==== Literature ====
- Gallus Anonymus, Polish chronicler and historian, begins to write Gesta principum Polonorum, to Bolesław III.

==== Religion ====
- Easter – The citizens of Laon in France, having proclaimed a commune, murder Bishop Waldric in his cathedral.

== Births ==
- García IV ("the Restorer"), king of Navarre (d. 1150)
- February 3 – Abu Ishaq Ibrahim ibn Ahmad al-Mustazhir, was the son of Abbasid caliph al-Mustazhir and Ismah.
- Henry II (Jasomirgott), duke of Austria (d. 1177)
- Henry IV ("the Blind"), count of Luxembourg (d. 1196)
- Mahaut of Albon, countess of Savoy (d. 1148)
- Sasaki Hideyoshi, Japanese samurai (d. 1184)
- Sibylla of Anjou, countess of Flanders (d. 1165)

== Deaths ==
- Easter – Waldric, English Lord Chancellor and Bishop of Laon, murdered (b. 1050)
- May 13 – Ulric II (or Udalrich), Italian nobleman
- October 5 – Sigebert of Gembloux, French chronicler
- October 12 – Kogh Vasil ("the Robber"), Armenian ruler
- November 3 – Anna Vsevolodovna, Kievan princess
- Baldric of Noyon, bishop of Tournai (b. 1099)
- Bertrand of Tripoli, count of Toulouse and Tripoli
- Elimar I (or Egilmar), count of Oldenburg (b. 1040)
- Fakhr-un-Nisa, Arab scholar and calligrapher
- George II (or Giorgi), king of Georgia (b. 1054)
- Ghibbelin (or Gibelin), archbishop of Arles
- Henry (or Henri), count of Portugal (b. 1066)
- Kyansittha, king of the Pagan Empire (or 1113)
- Maud of Apulia, Norman noblewoman (b. c.1060)
- Su Zhe, Chinese politician and historian (b. 1039)
- Tancred, Italo-Norman nobleman (b. 1075)
- Vukan I, Grand Prince of Serbia (b. 1050)

== See also ==
- List of state leaders in 1112
