= 1115 =

1115 in various calendars
- Gregorian calendar: 1115; MCXV
- Ab urbe condita: 1868
- Armenian calendar: 564; ԹՎ ՇԿԴ
- Assyrian calendar: 5865
- Balinese saka calendar: 1036–1037
- Bengali calendar: 521–522
- Berber calendar: 2065
- English Regnal year: 15 Hen. 1 – 16 Hen. 1
- Buddhist calendar: 1659
- Burmese calendar: 477
- Byzantine calendar: 6623–6624
- Chinese calendar: 甲午年 (Wood Horse); 3812 or 3605 — to — 乙未年 (Wood Goat); 3813 or 3606
- Coptic calendar: 831–832
- Discordian calendar: 2281
- Ethiopian calendar: 1107–1108
- Hebrew calendar: 4875–4876
- Hindu calendars
- Vikram Samvat: 1171–1172
- Shaka Samvat: 1036–1037
- Kali Yuga: 4215–4216
- Holocene calendar: 11115
- Igbo calendar: 115–116
- Iranian calendar: 493–494
- Islamic calendar: 508–509
- Japanese calendar: Eikyū 3 (永久３年)
- Javanese calendar: 1020–1021
- Julian calendar: 1115; MCXV
- Korean calendar: 3448
- Minguo calendar: 797 before ROC 民前797年
- Nanakshahi calendar: −353
- Seleucid era: 1426/1427 AG
- Thai solar calendar: 1657–1658
- Tibetan calendar: ཤིང་ཕོ་རྟ་ལོ་ (male Wood-Horse); 1241 or 860 or 88 — to — ཤིང་མོ་ལུག་ལོ་ (female Wood-Sheep); 1242 or 861 or 89

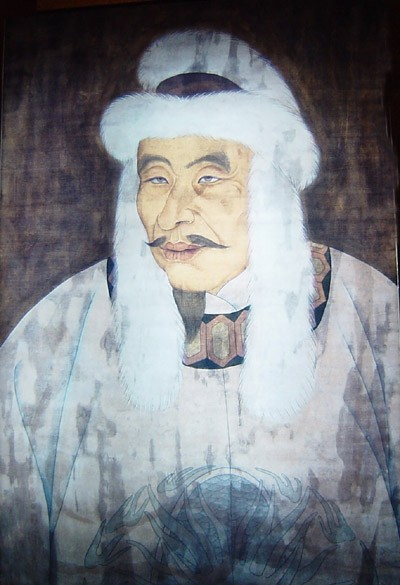
Emperor Taizu of Jin (1068–1123)

Year 1115 (MCXV) was a common year starting on Friday of the Julian calendar.

== Events ==
=== By place ===
==== Levant ====
- September 14 – Battle of Sarmin: The Crusaders, under Prince Roger of Salerno, surprise and rout the Seljuk Turkish army (some 8,000 men), led by Emir Bursuq ibn Bursuq, at Sarmin (modern Syria). Bursuq barely avoids capture, and escapes with a few hundred horsemen. Roger reoccupies the fortress of Kafartab, and consolidates his territory around Antioch.
- The Crusader castle of Montreal (located in Jordan) is commissioned by King Baldwin I of Jerusalem, during an expedition against the Seljuk Turks.

==== Europe ====
- February 11 – Battle of Welfesholz: Duke Lothair of Supplinburg joins the rebellious Saxon forces, and defeats the German Imperial Army of Emperor Henry V at Welfesholz, in Saxony-Anhalt (modern Germany).
- July 24 – Matilda, margravine of Tuscany, dies at Bondeno. During her reign she waged an intermittent war with Henry IV, Holy Roman Emperor, over the inheritance rights of her fiefs in Lombardy and Tuscany.

==== Asia ====
- The Jin dynasty (1115–1234) (or Great Jin) is created by the Jurchen tribal chieftain Taizu (or Aguda). He establishes a dual-administration system: a Chinese-style bureaucracy to rule over northern and northeast China.
- The 19-year-old Minamoto no Tameyoshi, Japanese nobleman and samurai, gains recognition by suppressing a riot against Emperor Toba at a monastery near Kyoto (approximate date).

==== Mesoamerica ====
- The Mixtec ruler Eight Deer Jaguar Claw is defeated in battle and sacrificed by a coalition of city-states, led by his brother-in law Four Wind, at Tilantongo in the Mixteca Alta region (modern Mexico).

=== By topic ===
==== Religion ====
- Arnulf of Chocques is accused of sexual relations with a Muslim woman. He is briefly removed from his position as patriarch of Jerusalem.
- Peter Abelard, French scholastic philosopher, becomes master of the cathedral school of Notre-Dame and meets Héloïse d'Argenteuil.
- Clairvaux Abbey is founded by Bernard, French abbot and a major leader in the reform of Benedictine monasticism, in France.
- Hugh of Saint Victor, French theologian and writer, joins the Victorines (at the Augustinian Abbey of St. Victor) in Paris.

== Births ==
- April 18 – Gertrude of Süpplingenburg, German duchess and regent (d. 1143)
- September 18 – Empress Wu (Song dynasty), Chinese consort (d. 1197)
- Aubrey de Vere, 1st Earl of Oxford, English nobleman (approximate date)
- Berenguer Ramon, Count of Provence (d. 1144)
- Erling Skakke, Norwegian nobleman (approximate date)
- Eustathius of Thessalonica, Byzantine archbishop (d. 1195)
- Euthymios Malakes, Byzantine bishop (approximate date)
- Fulk I FitzWarin (or Fulke), English nobleman (d. 1170)
- Gilbert de Clare, 1st Earl of Hertford, English nobleman (d. 1152)
- Hugo Etherianis, Italian cardinal and adviser (d. 1182)
- Joel ben Isaac ha-Levi, German rabbi and writer (d. 1200)
- Li Tao (or Renfu), Chinese historian and writer (d. 1184)
- Magnus IV ("the Blind"), king of Norway (approximate date)
- Pedro Fernández de Castro (Grand Master of the Order of Santiago), Spanish nobleman (d. 1184)
- Peter Cellensis, French abbot and bishop (d. 1183)
- Roger de Pont L'Évêque, Norman archbishop (d. 1181)
- Welf VI, margrave of Tuscany (House of Welf) (d. 1191)
- Wichmann von Seeburg, German archbishop (d. 1192)
- William V, Marquis of Montferrat ("the Old"), ruler of the March of Montferrat (d. 1191)

== Deaths ==
- May 16 – Lambert of Arras, Flemish bishop
- July 8 – Peter the Hermit, French religious leader
- July 24 – Matilda, margravine of Tuscany (b. 1046)
- September 27 – Bonfilius, Italian Saint, bishop of Foligno
- December 22 – Olav Magnusson, king of Norway (b. 1099)
- December 23 – Ivo of Chartres, French bishop (b. 1040)
- December 30 – Theodoric II, Duke of Lorraine
- Abu al-Mu'in al-Nasafi, Arab theologian (or 1114)
- Adela of Flanders, queen consort of Denmark (b. 1064)
- Artau II, Count of Pallars Sobirà, Catalan nobleman (approximate date)
- Eight Deer Jaguar Claw, Mixtec ruler (b. 1063)
- Gerberga, Countess of Provence (or Gerburge)
- Godfrey of Amiens, French bishop (b. 1066)
- Leo Marsicanus, Italian cardinal (b. 1046)
- Mazdali ibn Tilankan, Almoravid governor
- Odo of Champagne (Odo II or Eudes), French nobleman
- Reynelm (or Reinelm), English bishop of Hereford
- Shin Arahan, Burmese religious adviser
- Tanchelm of Antwerp, Flemish priest
- Turgot of Durham, English churchman, bishop of St Andrews
