= 1108 =

1108 in various calendars
- Gregorian calendar: 1108; MCVIII
- Ab urbe condita: 1861
- Armenian calendar: 557; ԹՎ ՇԾԷ
- Assyrian calendar: 5858
- Balinese saka calendar: 1029–1030
- Bengali calendar: 514–515
- Berber calendar: 2058
- English Regnal year: 8 Hen. 1 – 9 Hen. 1
- Buddhist calendar: 1652
- Burmese calendar: 470
- Byzantine calendar: 6616–6617
- Chinese calendar: 丁亥年 (Fire Pig); 3805 or 3598 — to — 戊子年 (Earth Rat); 3806 or 3599
- Coptic calendar: 824–825
- Discordian calendar: 2274
- Ethiopian calendar: 1100–1101
- Hebrew calendar: 4868–4869
- Hindu calendars
- Vikram Samvat: 1164–1165
- Shaka Samvat: 1029–1030
- Kali Yuga: 4208–4209
- Holocene calendar: 11108
- Igbo calendar: 108–109
- Iranian calendar: 486–487
- Islamic calendar: 501–502
- Japanese calendar: Kajō 3 / Tennin 1 (天仁元年)
- Javanese calendar: 1013–1014
- Julian calendar: 1108; MCVIII
- Korean calendar: 3441
- Minguo calendar: 804 before ROC 民前804年
- Nanakshahi calendar: −360
- Seleucid era: 1419/1420 AG
- Thai solar calendar: 1650–1651
- Tibetan calendar: མེ་མོ་ཕག་ལོ་ (female Fire-Boar); 1234 or 853 or 81 — to — ས་ཕོ་བྱི་བ་ལོ་ (male Earth-Rat); 1235 or 854 or 82

Year 1108 (MCVIII) was a leap year starting on Wednesday of the Julian calendar.

== Events ==
=== By place ===
==== Europe ====
- Spring – King Sigurd I sails from England, on the Norwegian Crusade to Palestine. He repels a Muslim fleet near the Tagus River, then attacks Sintra, Lisbon and Alcácer do Sal, and finally defeats a second Muslim fleet further south.
- May 29 – Battle of Uclés: Almoravid forces defeat the armies of Castile and León. The advance of the Reconquista is halted, and the Berbers re-capture the towns of Uclés, Cuenca, Huete and Ocaña. The Christians, many of nobility, are beheaded.
- July 29 – King Philip I dies at Melun, after a 48-year reign. He is succeeded by his son Louis VI, who, at the start of his rule, faces insurrections from feudal brigands and rebellious robber barons.
- September – Siege of Dyrrhachium: Italo-Norman forces under Bohemond I lift the siege due to illness and lack of supplies. Bohemond becomes a vassal of the Byzantine Empire by signing the Treaty of Devol.
- Autumn – The Principality of Nitra ceases to exist, after King Coloman of Hungary, deposes its last ruler, Álmos, duke of Croatia.
- The consuls of Bergamo are first mentioned, indicating that the city has become an independent commune in Lombardy (Northern Italy).

==== Levant ====
- Summer – Jawali Saqawa, Turkish ruler of Mosul, accepts a ransom of 30,000 dinar by Count Joscelin I and releases his cousin Baldwin II, count of Edessa, who is held as prisoner (see 1104).
- Baldwin I marches out against Sidon, with the support of a squadron of sailor-adventurers from various Italian cities. A Fatimid fleet from Egypt defeats the Italians in a sea-battle outside the harbour.

==== Asia ====
- The Taira and Minamoto clans join forces to rule Japan, after defeating the warrior monks of the Enryaku-ji temple near Kyoto. The Taira replace many Fujiwara nobles in important offices – while the Minamoto gain more military experience by bringing parts of Northern Honshu under Japanese control (approximate date).

=== By topic ===
==== Religion ====
- Chichester Cathedral is consecrated under Ralph de Luffa, bishop of Chichester, in England.
- Construction begins on the tower of Winchester Cathedral, building continues until 1120.
- Pistoia Cathedral in Italy is damaged by a severe fire.
- June 13 – Restored Ferentino Cathedral in Italy is consecrated.

== Births ==
- Andronikos Komnenos, Byzantine prince (d. 1142) (approximate date)
- Baldwin IV, count of Hainaut (d. 1171)
- Bohemond II, Italo-Norman prince of Antioch (d. 1130) (approximate date)
- Derbforgaill, Irish princess (d. 1193)
- Henry the Proud, duke of Bavaria (d. 1139) (approximate date)
- Leopold the Generous, duke of Bavaria (d. 1141) (approximate date)

== Deaths ==
- January 4 – Gertrude, Grand Princess of Kiev
- March 7 – Gundulf, Norman bishop of Rochester (b. c.1024)
- March 18 – Abe no Munetō, Japanese samurai (b. 1032)
- May 21 – Gerard, Norman archbishop of York and Lord Chancellor of England
- May 29
  - García Ordóñez, Castilian nobleman
  - Sancho Alfónsez, Castilian nobleman
- July 5 – Guy of Hauteville, Italo-Norman diplomat
- July 29 – Philip I, king of France
- Summer – Urse d'Abetot, Norman sheriff of Worcestershire
- November 15 – Enrico Contarini, bishop of Castello
- García Álvarez, Castilian official and military leader
- Gonzalo, bishop of Mondoñedo (approximate date)
- Gregory III, count of Tusculum (approximate date)
- Guy II the Red of Rochefort, French nobleman and crusader
- Veera Ballala I, Indian ruler of the Hoysala Empire
- Wang, Chinese empress consort of the Song dynasty (b. 1084)
