= 1113 =

1113 in various calendars
- Gregorian calendar: 1113; MCXIII
- Ab urbe condita: 1866
- Armenian calendar: 562; ԹՎ ՇԿԲ
- Assyrian calendar: 5863
- Balinese saka calendar: 1034–1035
- Bengali calendar: 519–520
- Berber calendar: 2063
- English Regnal year: 13 Hen. 1 – 14 Hen. 1
- Buddhist calendar: 1657
- Burmese calendar: 475
- Byzantine calendar: 6621–6622
- Chinese calendar: 壬辰年 (Water Dragon); 3810 or 3603 — to — 癸巳年 (Water Snake); 3811 or 3604
- Coptic calendar: 829–830
- Discordian calendar: 2279
- Ethiopian calendar: 1105–1106
- Hebrew calendar: 4873–4874
- Hindu calendars
- Vikram Samvat: 1169–1170
- Shaka Samvat: 1034–1035
- Kali Yuga: 4213–4214
- Holocene calendar: 11113
- Igbo calendar: 113–114
- Iranian calendar: 491–492
- Islamic calendar: 506–507
- Japanese calendar: Ten'ei 4 / Eikyū 1 (永久元年)
- Javanese calendar: 1018–1019
- Julian calendar: 1113; MCXIII
- Korean calendar: 3446
- Minguo calendar: 799 before ROC 民前799年
- Nanakshahi calendar: −355
- Seleucid era: 1424/1425 AG
- Thai solar calendar: 1655–1656
- Tibetan calendar: ཆུ་ཕོ་འབྲུག་ལོ་ (male Water-Dragon); 1239 or 858 or 86 — to — ཆུ་མོ་སྦྲུལ་ལོ་ (female Water-Snake); 1240 or 859 or 87

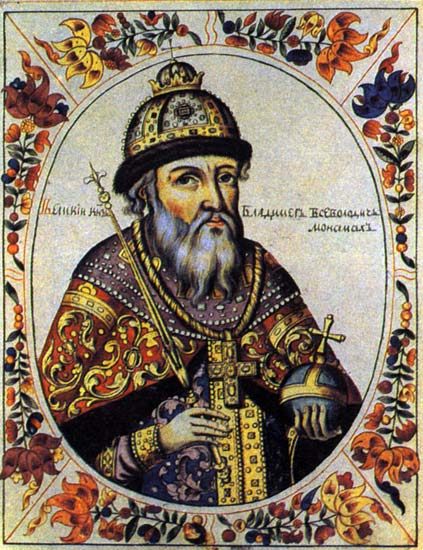
Vladimir II Monomakh, Grand Prince of Kiev from 1113

Year 1113 (MCXIII) was a common year starting on Wednesday of the Julian calendar.

== Events ==
=== By place ===
==== Byzantine Empire ====
- Spring – Siege of Nicaea: Malik Shah, Seljuk ruler of the Sultanate of Rum, sends an expedition through Bithynia to the very walls of Nicaea. Seljuk forces raid Abydos on the Hellespont, with its rich custom-houses. Malik Shah attacks and captures Pergamum. Emperor Alexios I Komnenos sets out to meet the Seljuk invaders. He lifts the siege at Nicaea and wins a complete victory near Cotyaeum (modern Turkey).

==== Levant ====
- January 15 – The Order of Knights of the Hospital of Saint John of Jerusalem (Knights Hospitaller), founded to protect pilgrims to the Holy Land, is formally recognized by the papal bull (proclamation) Pie Postulatio Voluntatis issued by Pope Paschal II.
- June 28 – Battle of Al-Sannabra: The Crusaders led by Baldwin I are defeated (due to a feigned flight) by a Seljuk army under Mawdud ibn Altuntash, the Turkic governor (atabeg) of Mosul, at the Jordan River south of the Sea of Galilee. Mawdud sends raiding columns to ravage the countryside and sacks the town of Nablus.
- September – King Baldwin I of Jerusalem marries Adelaide del Vasto, the wealthy widow of Count Roger I of Sicily ('Bosso') in Acre. She lands in Palestine accompanied by Arab soldiers (her personal bodyguard) and travels to Jerusalem. Their marriage is bigamous, because Baldwin is legally still married to his second wife Arda of Armenia.

==== Europe ====
- April 16 – Sviatopolk II, Grand Prince of Kiev, dies after a 20-year reign and is succeeded by his 60-year-old cousin Vladimir II Monomakh. He begins a campaign against the Cumans on the steppe in an effort to reunite the land of Kievan Rus'.
- September 7 – The Republic of Pisa signs a treaty with Ramon Berenguer III ('the Great'), count of Barcelona. The Pisan fleet embarks on a campaign against the Moors in the Balearic Islands.
- The Republic of Florence conquers the neighboring city of Montecascioli, as part of its effort to extend its domination over the contado (provinces of Italy).
- Peter Abelard, a French scholastic philosopher, opens his school in Paris, on the heights of Montagne Sainte-Geneviève (approximate date).
- Queen Urraca of Castile unsuccessfully attempts to seize the city of Burgos from her ex-husband, King Alfonso the Battler.

==== Asia ====
- A Thousand Li of Rivers and Mountains, the only extant work by the Chinese painter Wang Ximeng, is finished.
- King Suryavarman II begins his reign as ruler of the Khmer Empire (modern Cambodia).

=== By topic ===
==== Religion ====
- Bridlington Priory is founded in England, in the Diocese of York (approximate date).

== Births ==
- January 11 – Wang Chongyang, Chinese Daoist (d. 1170)
- August 24 – Geoffrey Plantagenet, Count of Anjou ("the Fair") (d. 1151)
- Donnchad I, Earl of Fife (Duncan), Scottish nobleman (d. 1154)
- Frederick of Hallum, Frisian priest and abbot (d. 1175)
- Shams-ul-Mulk Isma'il, Seljuk governor (d. 1135)
- Shun'e (or Tayū no Kimi), Japanese poet (d. 1191)
- Stefan Nemanja, Grand Prince of Serbia (d. 1199)
- Walter de Clifford, English nobleman (d. 1190)

== Deaths ==
- January 5 – Ulrich I, Moravian ruler (House of Přemyslid)
- April 13 – Ida of Lorraine, French countess (b. 1040)
- April 16 – Sviatopolk II, Grand Prince of Kiev (b. 1050)
- August 4 – Gertrude of Saxony, countess of Holland
- October 2 – Mawdud ibn Altuntash, Turkic governor
- December 10 – Fakhr al-Mulk Radwan, Seljuk ruler
- Dharanindravarman I, king of the Khmer Empire
- Girard I (or Guinard), count of Roussillon (b. 1070)
- Ibn Tahir of Caesarea, Arab historian (b. 1056)
- Kyansittha, king of the Pagan Empire (or 1112)
- Liu, Chinese empress of the Song dynasty (b. 1079)
- Nestor the Chronicler, Russian historian (or 1114)
- Odo of Tournai, bishop of Cambrai (b. 1060)
- Syr ibn Abi Bakr, Almoravid military leader
- Wuyashu, chieftain of the Wanyan tribe (b. 1061)
