= 1114 =

1114 in various calendars
- Gregorian calendar: 1114; MCXIV
- Ab urbe condita: 1867
- Armenian calendar: 563; ԹՎ ՇԿԳ
- Assyrian calendar: 5864
- Balinese saka calendar: 1035–1036
- Bengali calendar: 520–521
- Berber calendar: 2064
- English Regnal year: 14 Hen. 1 – 15 Hen. 1
- Buddhist calendar: 1658
- Burmese calendar: 476
- Byzantine calendar: 6622–6623
- Chinese calendar: 癸巳年 (Water Snake); 3811 or 3604 — to — 甲午年 (Wood Horse); 3812 or 3605
- Coptic calendar: 830–831
- Discordian calendar: 2280
- Ethiopian calendar: 1106–1107
- Hebrew calendar: 4874–4875
- Hindu calendars
- Vikram Samvat: 1170–1171
- Shaka Samvat: 1035–1036
- Kali Yuga: 4214–4215
- Holocene calendar: 11114
- Igbo calendar: 114–115
- Iranian calendar: 492–493
- Islamic calendar: 507–508
- Japanese calendar: Eikyū 2 (永久２年)
- Javanese calendar: 1019–1020
- Julian calendar: 1114; MCXIV
- Korean calendar: 3447
- Minguo calendar: 798 before ROC 民前798年
- Nanakshahi calendar: −354
- Seleucid era: 1425/1426 AG
- Thai solar calendar: 1656–1657
- Tibetan calendar: ཆུ་མོ་སྦྲུལ་ལོ་ (female Water-Snake); 1240 or 859 or 87 — to — ཤིང་ཕོ་རྟ་ལོ་ (male Wood-Horse); 1241 or 860 or 88

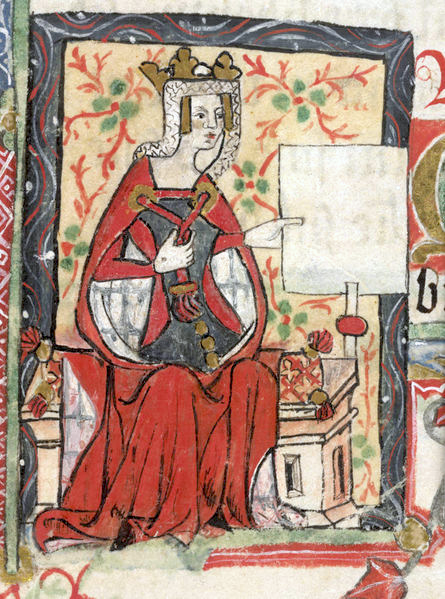
Empress Matilda (Maude) (1102–1167)

Year 1114 (MCXIV) was a common year starting on Thursday of the Julian calendar.

== Events ==
=== By place ===
==== Europe ====
- January 7 – Emperor Henry V marries Matilda (or Maude), 11-year-old daughter of King Henry I of England, at Worms (modern Germany). A political conflict breaks out across the Holy Roman Empire after the marriage, triggered when Henry arrests Chancellor Adalbert and various other German princes.
- Count Ramon Berenguer III (the Great) of Barcelona, joins the expedition to the Balearic Islands. A Pisan and Catalan fleet (some 450 ships), supported by a large army, conquer Ibiza and Mallorca. They destroy the bases on the islands used by Moorish pirates to prey on Mediterranean shipping.
- Battle of Martorell: The Almoravid governor of Zaragoza, Muhàmmad ibn al-Hajj, launches an expedition against the County of Barcelona, but is defeated in an ambush near Martorell.
- As part of the Norman expansion southward, Count Routrou II enters the service of King Alfonso I (the Battler) of Aragon.

==== Asia ====
- Emperor Huizong of the Song dynasty sends a gift of Chinese musical instruments, for use in royal banquets to the Korean court of Goryeo, by request from King Yejong.

=== By topic ===
==== Earthquake ====
- November 29 – A large earthquake damages the areas of the Crusaders in the Middle East. From Antioch and Mamistra to Marash and Edessa are hit by the shocks.

==== Religion ====
- The cathedral of Chichester in England, constructed of wood, is destroyed by fire.
- Pontigny Abbey, a Cistercian monastery, is founded (located in Burgundy).

== Births ==
- Al-Suhayli, Moorish scholar and writer (d. 1185)
- Bhāskara II, Indian mathematician (d. 1185)
- Dirk VI (or Theodoric), count of Holland (d. 1157)
- Fujiwara no Shunzei, Japanese nobleman (d. 1204)
- Gebhard III, German nobleman (approximate date)
- Gerard of Cremona, Italian translator (d. 1187)
- Henry of Scotland, 3rd Earl of Northumbria (d. 1152)
- Otto I, German bishop and chronicler (d. 1158)
- Ramon Berenguer IV, count of Barcelona (d. 1162)

== Deaths ==
- February 24 – Thomas II, archbishop of York
- October – Abu Ishaq Ibrahim ibn Ahmad al-Mustazhir, was the son of Abbasid caliph al-Mustazhir and Ismah.
- Abu al-Mu'in al-Nasafi, Arab theologian (or 1115)
- Álvar Fáñez (or Háñez), Castilian nobleman
- Alypius of the Caves, Kievan monk and painter
- Erard I, French nobleman and crusader (b. 1060)
- Nestor the Chronicler, Kievan historian (or 1113)
- Richard of Salerno, Norman nobleman (b. 1060)
- Shahriyar IV, king of Mazandaran (b. 1039)
- Tokushi, Japanese empress consort (b. 1060)
