= 1107 =

1107 in various calendars
- Gregorian calendar: 1107; MCVII
- Ab urbe condita: 1860
- Armenian calendar: 556; ԹՎ ՇԾԶ
- Assyrian calendar: 5857
- Balinese saka calendar: 1028–1029
- Bengali calendar: 513–514
- Berber calendar: 2057
- English Regnal year: 7 Hen. 1 – 8 Hen. 1
- Buddhist calendar: 1651
- Burmese calendar: 469
- Byzantine calendar: 6615–6616
- Chinese calendar: 丙戌年 (Fire Dog); 3804 or 3597 — to — 丁亥年 (Fire Pig); 3805 or 3598
- Coptic calendar: 823–824
- Discordian calendar: 2273
- Ethiopian calendar: 1099–1100
- Hebrew calendar: 4867–4868
- Hindu calendars
- Vikram Samvat: 1163–1164
- Shaka Samvat: 1028–1029
- Kali Yuga: 4207–4208
- Holocene calendar: 11107
- Igbo calendar: 107–108
- Iranian calendar: 485–486
- Islamic calendar: 500–501
- Japanese calendar: Kajō 2 (嘉承２年)
- Javanese calendar: 1012–1013
- Julian calendar: 1107; MCVII
- Korean calendar: 3440
- Minguo calendar: 805 before ROC 民前805年
- Nanakshahi calendar: −361
- Seleucid era: 1418/1419 AG
- Thai solar calendar: 1649–1650
- Tibetan calendar: མེ་ཕོ་ཁྱི་ལོ་ (male Fire-Dog); 1233 or 852 or 80 — to — མེ་མོ་ཕག་ལོ་ (female Fire-Boar); 1234 or 853 or 81

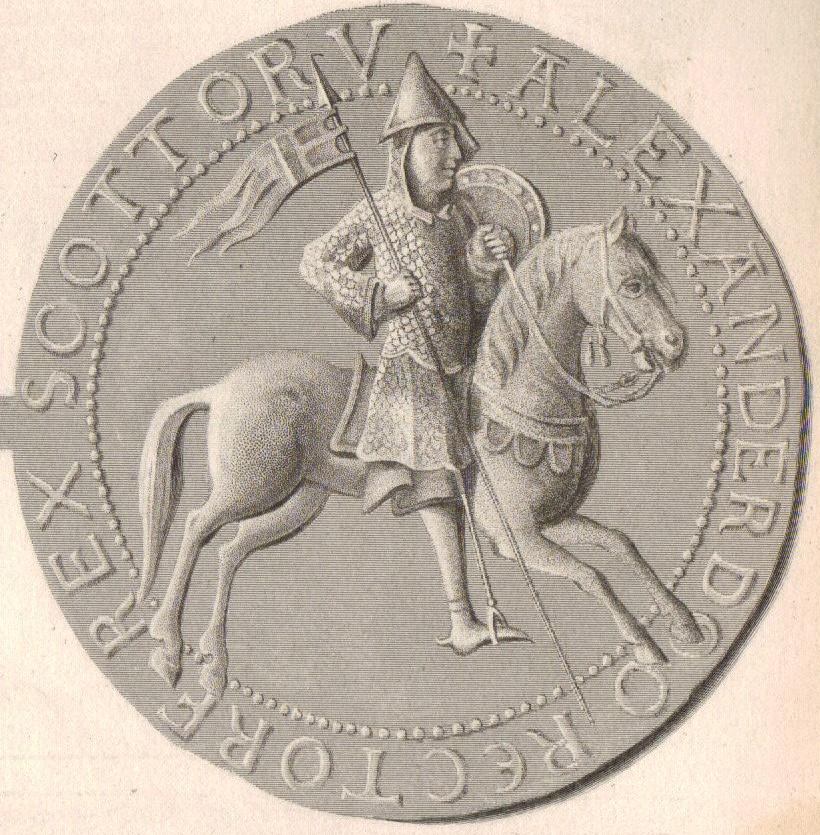
Seal of King Alexander I of Scotland

Year 1107 (MCVII) was a common year starting on Tuesday of the Julian calendar.

== Events ==
=== By place ===
==== Scotland ====
- January 8 – King Edgar dies at Edinburgh Castle after a 9-year reign. He is succeeded by his brother Alexander I, who is married to Sybilla of Normandy (an illegitimate daughter of King Henry I). A split of unity, between Alexander and his younger brother David I, makes David co-ruler in Lothian and Strathclyde (Southern Scotland). He does not receive the title of king, but of "Prince of the Cumbrians".

==== England ====
- August 11 – The Investiture Controversy is resolved, by the reconciliation of Henry I and Anselm, archbishop of Canterbury and the mass consecration of bishops by Anselm at the royal Palace of Westminster: William Giffard to Winchester, Roger to Salisbury, Reynelm to Hereford, William Warelwast to Exeter and Urban to Llandaff. Roger of Salisbury is also appointed Justiciar in this year.

==== Europe ====
- Spring – Duke Bolesław III along with his ally King Coloman of Hungary, invades Bohemia in order to aid Duke Svatopluk in gaining the Bohemian throne. The Polish expedition is a complete success: on May 14 Svatopluk is installed as Duke of Bohemia in Prague. King Henry V demands tribute from Svatopluk as his overlord and vassal of the Holy Roman Empire.
- Autumn – King Sigurd I sails for the Holy Land with 60 ships (with some 5,000 men) on the first stage of the Norwegian Crusade to Palestine. Now 17, he is the first European king to support the Crusaders in the Levant. Sigurd leaves his older brother Eystein I to rule the kingdom in his absence – and visits England, France, Galicia and Sicily en route.
- October 9 – Bohemond I, prince of Antioch, lands with his army (some 34,000 men) in Epirus near Avlona. He plunders the countryside and marches to Dyrrhachium (modern Albania).
- November – Siege of Dyrrhachium: Bohemond I begins the siege of the Adriatic port city of Dyrrhachium held by its doux Alexios Komnenos.
- Winter – Bolesław III undertakes a punitive expedition against his half-brother Zbigniew with the help of Kievan and Hungarian allies.
- Saracen pirates raid the Benedictine monastery of Saint Honorat, on the Lérins Islands .

==== Levant ====
- June – Kilij Arslan I, sultan of Sultanate of Rum, conquers Mosul (during the Battle of Mosul). But he is defeated and killed by Seljuk forces under Muhammad I Tapar supported by the Ortoqids and Fakhr al-Mulk Radwan.
- The Crusaders under Tancred, prince of Galilee, recover the Cilician cities of Tarsus, Adana and Mamistra conquered by Emperor Alexios I 3-years ago (see 1104).
- Joscelin I, lord of Turbessel, is released by Ilghazi (the Artukid ruler of Mardin) for a ransom of 20,000 dinars and the promise of military aid.
- Emir Fadl ibn Rabi'ah is expelled by Toghtekin, ruler (atabeg) of Damascus in Syria (approximate date).

==== Asia ====
- August 9 – Emperor Horikawa dies after a 20-year reign and is succeeded by his 4-year-old son Toba as emperor of Japan.

=== By topic ===
==== Commerce ====
- Chinese authorities print paper money in three colors to thwart counterfeiting (approximate date).

==== Literature ====
- Emperor Hui Zong writes his Treatise on Tea, the most detailed description of the Song sophisticated style of tea ceremony.

== Births ==
- June 12 – Gao Zong, Chinese emperor (d. 1187)
- Anthelm of Belley, French prior and bishop (d. 1178)
- Enrico Dandolo, doge of Venice (d.1205)
- Ghiyath ad-Din Mas'ud, Seljuk sultan (d. 1152)
- Falaki Shirvani, Persian poet and writer (d. 1157)
- Kenkai, Japanese Shingon Buddhist monk (d. 1155)
- Stephen Kontostephanos, Byzantine general (d. 1149)
- William III, count of Nevers and Auxerre (d. 1161)

== Deaths ==
- January 8 – Edgar, king of Scotland
- March – Robert Fitzhamon, Lord of Glamorgan, Norman warrior and noble
- April 12 – Burchard, bishop of Basel
- May 24 – Raymond of Burgundy, count of Galicia
- August 9 – Horikawa, emperor of Japan (b. 1079)
- September 8 – Richard de Redvers, Norman warrior and baron (b. c.1066)
- September 9 – Roger Bigod of Norfolk, Norman knight and noble
- September 26 – Maurice, bishop of London and Lord Chancellor of England
- Changlu Zongze, Chinese Chan Buddhist monk
- Cheng Yi, Chinese neo-confusian philosopher (b. 1033)
- Kilij Arslan I, sultan of the Sultanate of Rum (b. 1079)
- Mi Fu, Chinese painter, poet and calligrapher (b. 1051)
