= 1104 =

1104 in various calendars
- Gregorian calendar: 1104; MCIV
- Ab urbe condita: 1857
- Armenian calendar: 553; ԹՎ ՇԾԳ
- Assyrian calendar: 5854
- Balinese saka calendar: 1025–1026
- Bengali calendar: 510–511
- Berber calendar: 2054
- English Regnal year: 4 Hen. 1 – 5 Hen. 1
- Buddhist calendar: 1648
- Burmese calendar: 466
- Byzantine calendar: 6612–6613
- Chinese calendar: 癸未年 (Water Goat); 3801 or 3594 — to — 甲申年 (Wood Monkey); 3802 or 3595
- Coptic calendar: 820–821
- Discordian calendar: 2270
- Ethiopian calendar: 1096–1097
- Hebrew calendar: 4864–4865
- Hindu calendars
- Vikram Samvat: 1160–1161
- Shaka Samvat: 1025–1026
- Kali Yuga: 4204–4205
- Holocene calendar: 11104
- Igbo calendar: 104–105
- Iranian calendar: 482–483
- Islamic calendar: 497–498
- Japanese calendar: Kōwa 6 / Chōji 1 (長治元年)
- Javanese calendar: 1009–1010
- Julian calendar: 1104; MCIV
- Korean calendar: 3437
- Minguo calendar: 808 before ROC 民前808年
- Nanakshahi calendar: −364
- Seleucid era: 1415/1416 AG
- Thai solar calendar: 1646–1647
- Tibetan calendar: ཆུ་མོ་ལུག་ལོ་ (female Water-Sheep); 1230 or 849 or 77 — to — ཤིང་ཕོ་སྤྲེ་ལོ་ (male Wood-Monkey); 1231 or 850 or 78

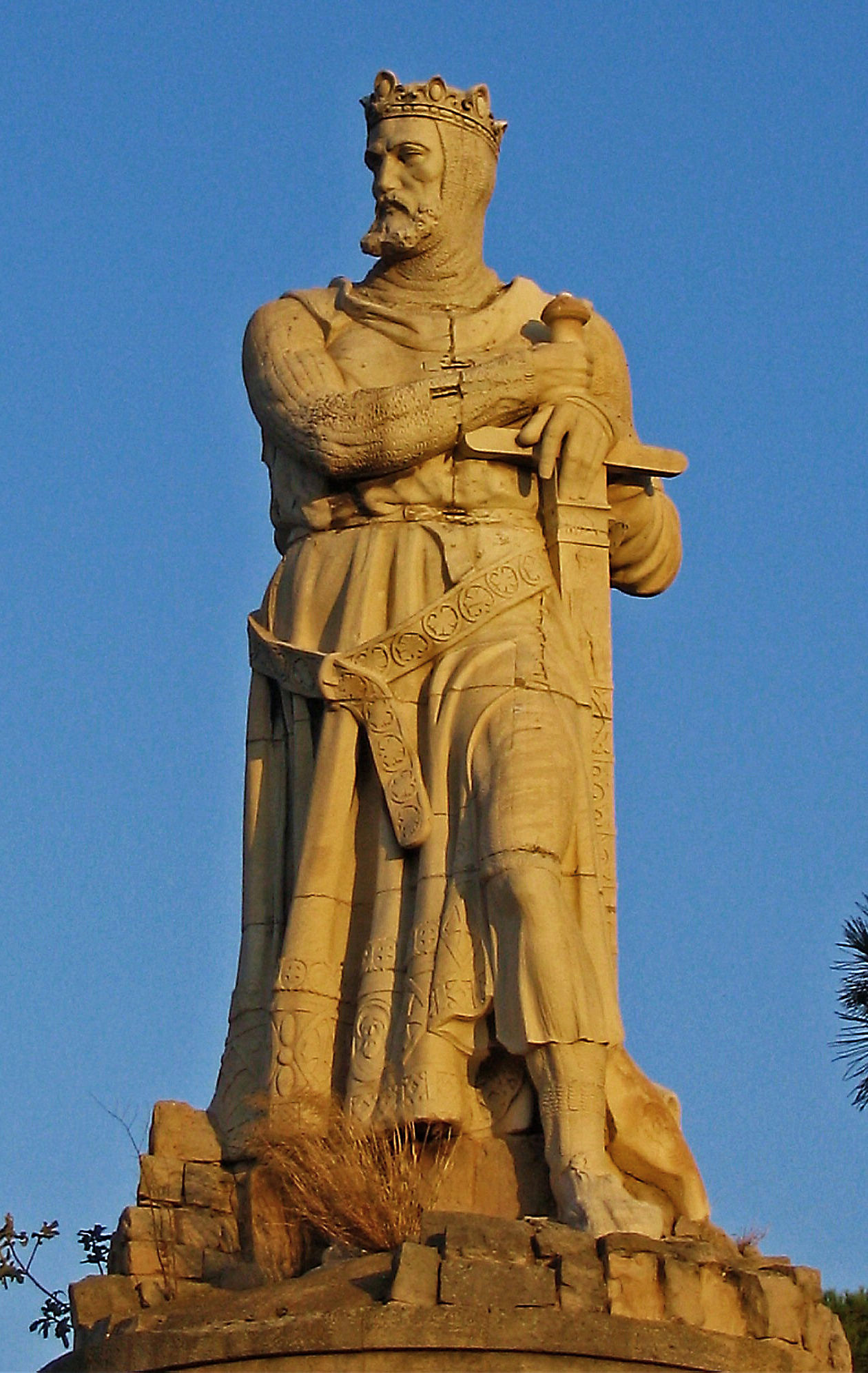
Statue of Alfonso I, King of Aragon and Navarre from 1104 to 1134.

Year 1104 (MCIV) was a leap year starting on Friday of the Julian calendar.

== Events ==
=== By place ===
==== Byzantine Empire ====
- Summer – The Byzantines re-occupy the Cilician cities of Tarsus, Adana and Mamistra. A naval squadron, under Admiral Cantacuzenus, pursues in Cypriot waters a Genoese raiding fleet, and sails on to Latakia, where they capture the harbour and the lower city. Bohemond I reinforces the garrison in the citadel.

==== Levant ====
- Spring – The Crusaders, led by Bohemond I, re-invade the territory of Aleppo, and try to capture the town of Kafar Latha. The attack fails, owing to the resistance of the local Banu tribe. Meanwhile, Joscelin of Courtenay cuts the communications between Aleppo and the Euphrates.
- May 7 – Battle of Harran: The Crusaders under Baldwin II are defeated by the Seljuk Turks. Baldwin and Joscelin of Courtenay are taken prisoner. Tancred (nephew of Bohemond I) becomes regent of Edessa. The defeat at Harran marks a key turning point of Crusader expansion.
- May 26 – King Baldwin I captures Acre, the port is besieged from April, and blockaded by the Genoese and Pisan fleet. Baldwin promises a free passage to those who want to move to Ascalon, but the Italian sailors plunder the wealthy Muslim emigrants and kill many of them.
- Autumn – Bohemond I departs to Italy for reinforcements. He takes with him gold and silver, and precious stuff to raise an army against Emperor Alexios I Komnenos. Tancred becomes co-ruler over Antioch – and appoints his brother-in-law, Richard of Salerno, as his deputy.
- Toghtekin, Seljuk ruler (atabeg) of Damascus, founds a short-lived principality in Syria (the first example of a series of Seljuk-ruled dynasties).

==== England ====
- September 3 – St. Cuthbert is reburied in Durham Cathedral.

==== Europe ====
- September 28 – Alfonso I becomes king of Aragon and Navarre (after the death of his half-brother Peter I).
- King David IV of Georgia defeats 100,000 Seljuk Turks with only 1,500 warriors (approximate date).
- Sultan Kilij Arslan I of the Sultanate of Rum starts a war with the Danishmendids.
- The Venetian Arsenal is founded in Venice.

==== Vietnam ====
- After the raid on Đại Việt in 1103, the Champa army under king Jaya Indravarman II successfully retakes three provinces in the Địa Lý regions but is quickly defeated by the national forces led by Lý Thường Kiệt, and is forced to withdraw from the country. Đại Việt under the Lý dynasty then takes control of the three Địa Lý provinces.

=== By topic ===
==== Religion ====
- April 21 – The new basilica at Vézelay Abbey (located in northern Burgundy in France) is dedicated.

==== Volcanology ====
- Autumn – The volcano Hekla erupts in Iceland and devastates farms for 45 miles (some 70 km) around.

== Births ==
- Euphrosyne of Polotsk, Kievan princess (d. 1167)
- Fujiwara no Kiyosuke, Japanese waka poet (d. 1177)
- Gens du Beaucet, French hermit and saint (d. 1127)
- Ibn Zafar al Siqilli, Arab-Sicilian politician (d. 1170)
- Robert de Beaumont, 2nd Earl of Leicester (d. 1168)
- Vladimir Volodarevich, Galician prince (d. 1152)
- Waleran de Beaumont, 1st Earl of Worcester (d. 1166)

== Deaths ==
- June 8 – Duqaq, Seljuk ruler of Damascus
- September 25 – Simon II, French nobleman
- October 26 – Johann I, bishop of Speyer
- Al-Mansur ibn al-Nasir, Hammadid ruler
- Danishmend Gazi, ruler of the Danishmends
- Ebontius, bishop of Barbastro
- Herewald of Llandaff, Welsh bishop
- Peter I, king of Aragon and Navarre
- Seraphin, archbishop of Esztergom
- Serlo, Norman cleric and abbot
- Sökmen, governor of Jerusalem
- Svend Tronkræver, Danish prince
