= 1109 =

1109 in various calendars
- Gregorian calendar: 1109; MCIX
- Ab urbe condita: 1862
- Armenian calendar: 558; ԹՎ ՇԾԸ
- Assyrian calendar: 5859
- Balinese saka calendar: 1030–1031
- Bengali calendar: 515–516
- Berber calendar: 2059
- English Regnal year: 9 Hen. 1 – 10 Hen. 1
- Buddhist calendar: 1653
- Burmese calendar: 471
- Byzantine calendar: 6617–6618
- Chinese calendar: 戊子年 (Earth Rat); 3806 or 3599 — to — 己丑年 (Earth Ox); 3807 or 3600
- Coptic calendar: 825–826
- Discordian calendar: 2275
- Ethiopian calendar: 1101–1102
- Hebrew calendar: 4869–4870
- Hindu calendars
- Vikram Samvat: 1165–1166
- Shaka Samvat: 1030–1031
- Kali Yuga: 4209–4210
- Holocene calendar: 11109
- Igbo calendar: 109–110
- Iranian calendar: 487–488
- Islamic calendar: 502–503
- Japanese calendar: Tennin 2 (天仁２年)
- Javanese calendar: 1014–1015
- Julian calendar: 1109; MCIX
- Korean calendar: 3442
- Minguo calendar: 803 before ROC 民前803年
- Nanakshahi calendar: −359
- Seleucid era: 1420/1421 AG
- Thai solar calendar: 1651–1652
- Tibetan calendar: ས་ཕོ་བྱི་བ་ལོ་ (male Earth-Rat); 1235 or 854 or 82 — to — ས་མོ་གླང་ལོ་ (female Earth-Ox); 1236 or 855 or 83

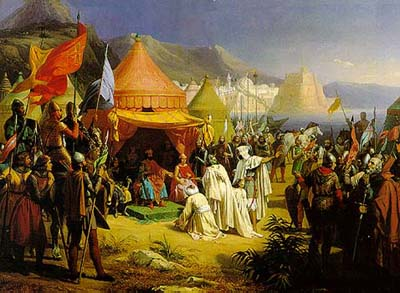
Fakhr al-Mulk, qadi of Tripoli, submits to Bertrand of Toulouse (middle) at the Siege of Tripoli.

Year 1109 (MCIX) was a common year starting on Friday of the Julian calendar.

== Events ==
=== By place ===
==== Levant ====
- July 12 – Siege of Tripoli: After a 7-year siege (supported by the Genoese fleet), Tripoli falls to the Crusaders. Fakhr al-Mulk ibn Ammar, qadi of Tripoli, submits to Bertrand of Toulouse (the eldest son of Raymond IV). He establishes the County of Tripoli, the fourth Crusader state in the Middle East. Raymond's nephew William II Jordan dies of an arrow wound sustained during the siege, leaving Bertrand as its sole ruler.

==== Europe ====
- Summer – Almoravid emir Ali ibn Yusuf organizes a public ritual of penance (auto-da-fé) of the works of Al-Ghazali, in front of the Great Mosque of Cordoba.
- July 1 – Urraca of León becomes queen of León, Castile and Galicia after the death of her father, King Alfonso VI, making her the first European queen regnant. She marries Alfonso I.
- August 10 – Battle of Nakło: Bolesław III leads an expedition into Pomerania. He besieges the castle of Nakło and defeats a Pomeranian relief force.
- August 24
  - Siege of Głogów: German forces led by King Henry V besiege Głogów. He is forced to abandon the siege – due to attacks of Polish guerilla warriors.
  - Battle of Hundsfeld: Bolesław III defeats the imperial forces under Henry V at Hundsfeld. The Germans are ambushed by the Polish forces.
- The Almoravid army, led by Ali ibn Yusuf, fails to reconquer Toledo (lost in 1085).

=== By topic ===
==== Education ====
- Anselm of Laon, French monk and theologian, becomes chancellor of the cathedral at Laon (approximate date).

== Births ==
- July 25 – Afonso I, king of Portugal (d. 1185)
- September 7 – Gongye, Korean queen (d. 1183)
- October 29 – Injong of Goryeo, Korean king (d. 1146)
- Abu'l-Hasan al-Hasan ibn Ali, Zirid emir (d. 1171)
- Al-Rashid, caliph of the Abbasid Caliphate (d. 1138)
- Béla II, king of Hungary and Croatia (d. 1141)
- Bertrand de Blanchefort, French Grand Master (d. 1169)
- William d'Aubigny, 1st Earl of Arundel (d. 1176)

== Deaths ==
- January 26 – Alberic of Cîteaux, French abbot
- April 14 – Fulk IV, count of Anjou (b. 1043)
- April 21 – Anselm, archbishop of Canterbury (b. 1033)
- April 28 – Hugh the Great, abbot of Cluny (b. 1024)
- May 12 – Dominic de la Calzada, Spanish priest (b. 1019)
- July 1 – Alfonso VI, king of León and Castile
- September 21 – Svatopluk, duke of Bohemia
- November 16 – Ingulf, Norman Benedictine abbot
- Eupraxia of Kiev, Holy Roman Empress
- Ngok Loden Sherab, Tibetan Buddhist monk (b. 1059)
- William II, count of Cerdagne and Tripoli
