= 1103 =

1103 in various calendars
- Gregorian calendar: 1103; MCIII
- Ab urbe condita: 1856
- Armenian calendar: 552; ԹՎ ՇԾԲ
- Assyrian calendar: 5853
- Balinese saka calendar: 1024–1025
- Bengali calendar: 509–510
- Berber calendar: 2053
- English Regnal year: 3 Hen. 1 – 4 Hen. 1
- Buddhist calendar: 1647
- Burmese calendar: 465
- Byzantine calendar: 6611–6612
- Chinese calendar: 壬午年 (Water Horse); 3800 or 3593 — to — 癸未年 (Water Goat); 3801 or 3594
- Coptic calendar: 819–820
- Discordian calendar: 2269
- Ethiopian calendar: 1095–1096
- Hebrew calendar: 4863–4864
- Hindu calendars
- Vikram Samvat: 1159–1160
- Shaka Samvat: 1024–1025
- Kali Yuga: 4203–4204
- Holocene calendar: 11103
- Igbo calendar: 103–104
- Iranian calendar: 481–482
- Islamic calendar: 496–497
- Japanese calendar: Kōwa 5 (康和５年)
- Javanese calendar: 1008–1009
- Julian calendar: 1103; MCIII
- Korean calendar: 3436
- Minguo calendar: 809 before ROC 民前809年
- Nanakshahi calendar: −365
- Seleucid era: 1414/1415 AG
- Thai solar calendar: 1645–1646
- Tibetan calendar: ཆུ་ཕོ་རྟ་ལོ་ (male Water-Horse); 1229 or 848 or 76 — to — ཆུ་མོ་ལུག་ལོ་ (female Water-Sheep); 1230 or 849 or 77

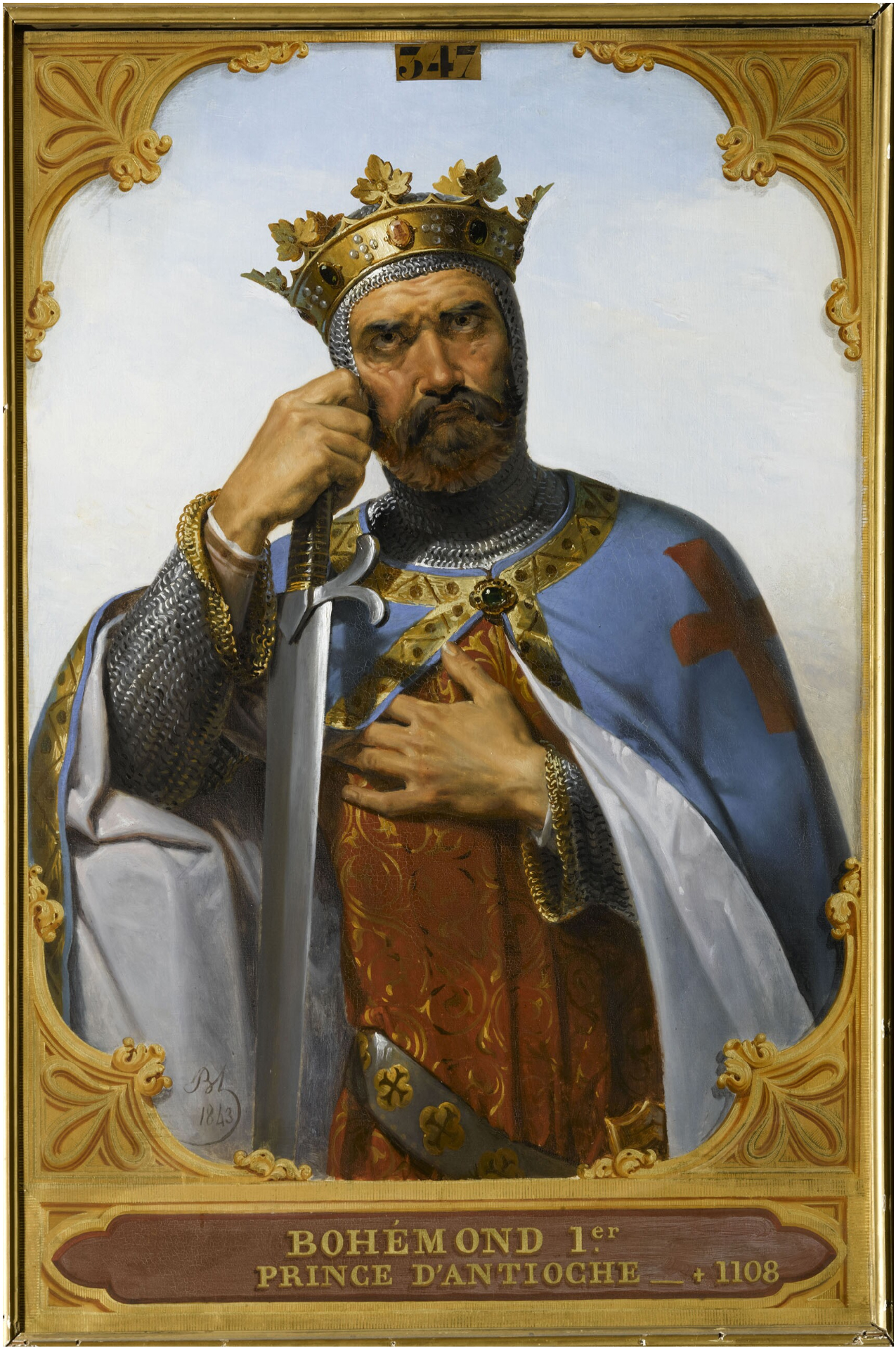
Bohemond I of Antioch (c. 1054–1111)

Year 1103 (MCIII) was a common year starting on Thursday of the Julian calendar.

== Events ==
=== By place ===
==== Levant ====
- Spring – Bohemond I, Norman prince of Antioch, is released from Seljuk imprisonment at Niksar, after a ransom is paid of 100,000 gold pieces. During his absence, Tancred (Bohemond's nephew) attacks the Byzantines, and re-captures the cities of Tarsus, Adana and Mamistra in Cilicia. Tancred is deprived of his lordship by Bohemond's return, and is rewarded with a small fief within the Principality of Antioch.
- The Crusaders under Raymond IV invade the Beqaa Valley and capture Tortosa to isolate Tripoli. Raymond expands towards the Orontes River, and begins to build a castle on the Mons Peregrinus which helps in the Siege of Tripoli (see 1102). Emperor Alexios I supports the Crusaders by sending a Byzantine fleet (ten ships) to blockade the port of Tripoli.
- Summer – The Crusaders led by Bohemond I and Joscelin of Courtenay raid the territory of Aleppo to gain supplies. They capture the town of Muslimiyah, and extract a large tribute. Sultan Fakhr al-Mulk Radwan, the Seljuk ruler of Aleppo, agrees to pay 7,000 gold pieces and ten horses to the Crusaders while Bohemond agrees to release all Seljuk prisoners captured at Muslimiyah.

==== Europe ====
- August 24 – King Magnus III is killed in battle with the Ulaid in Ulster. Sigurd Jorsalfare, Øystein Magnusson and Olaf Magnusson succeed him as joint kings of Norway.

==== Britain ====
- April 27 – Anselm, archbishop of Canterbury, again goes into exile after a dispute with King Henry I over the appointment of bishops and abbots to important Church positions.
- August 5 – Matilda of Scotland, queen of England as wife of Henry I, gives birth to their first son William Adelin at Winchester. They already have a daughter, Princess Matilda.

==== China ====
- Li Jie, Chinese government minister, publishes his Yingzao Fashi technical treatise on Chinese architecture, during the reign of Emperor Hui Zong of the Song dynasty.

==== Vietnam ====
- Lý Giác, a wizard, launched a rebellion against king Lý Nhân Tông of the Lý dynasty. The national army led by Lý Thường Kiệt quickly quelled the rebellion. Lý Giác then escaped to Champa and later provoked the war between the two countries which lasted for nearly 2 years.
- The Champa army, under king Jaya Indravarman II, raided Đại Việt's border and launched battles to retake three provinces in the Địa Lý regions.

=== By topic ===
==== Religion ====
- The Danish city of Lund in the province of Scania becomes a see of the Catholic Church, namely the ArchDiocese of Lund (approximate date).

== Births ==
- February 24 – Toba, emperor of Japan (d. 1156)
- March 24 – Yue Fei, Chinese general and poet (d. 1142)
- August 5 – William Adelin, duke of Normandy (d. 1120)
- Adeliza of Louvain, queen of England (d. 1151)
- Aénor de Châtellerault, duchess of Aquitaine (d. 1130)
- Alfonso I, count of Tripoli and Toulouse (d. 1148)
- Heilika of Lengenfeld, German countess (d. 1170)
- Henry II, margrave of the Saxon Ostmark (d. 1123)
- Rögnvald Kali Kolsson, Norwegian earl (d. 1158)
- Vsevolod of Pskov, Kievan prince (approximate date)
- Wivina, French Benedictine abbess (d. 1168)

== Deaths ==
- January 17 – Frutolf of Michelsberg, German monk
- March 18 – Sybilla of Conversano, Norman duchess
- July 10 – Eric I, king of Denmark
- August 24 – Magnus III, king of Norway (b. 1073)
- October 19 – Humbert II, count of Savoy (b. 1065)
- Al-Hakim al-Munajjim, Persian Nizari missionary
- Boedil Thurgotsdatter, Danish queen
- Ebles II, French nobleman (House of Montdidier)
- Henry I, German nobleman (House of Wettin)
- Isaac Alfasi, Algerian Talmudist and posek (b. 1013)
- Manegold of Lautenbach, German priest (b. 1030)
- Osbern FitzOsbern, bishop of Exeter (b. 1032)
- Sibylla of Burgundy, duchess of Burgundy (b. 1065)
- William Firmatus, Norman hermit and pilgrim (b. 1026)
