= 1160s =

Decade

The 1160s was a decade of the Julian Calendar which began on January 1, 1160, and ended on December 31, 1169.

== Events ==
=== 1160 ===
==== By place ====
====== Byzantine Empire ======
- Spring – Emperor Manuel I Komnenos sends an embassy led by John Kontostephanos to Jerusalem, to ask King Baldwin III to nominate one of the princesses of the Crusader states, as a bride for the widowed emperor. Their two candidates are 15-year-old Maria of Antioch, and Melisende of Tripoli. Baldwin suggests Melisende, and her brother Count Raymond III sets about gathering an enormous dowry. The ambassadors are not satisfied, and delay the marriage for over a year. They hear rumours about Melisende's birth, based on her mother's (Countess Hodierna of Jerusalem) infidelity, and therefore Melisende's possible illegitimacy. In the end, the Emperor marries Maria in 1161 and Melisende eventually enters a convent.

====== Europe ======
- January 25 – Frederick Barbarossa, Holy Roman Emperor, captures Crema, Lombardy after a 6-month siege, as part of his campaign against the independent Italian city-states. Some 20,000 survivors are allowed to leave the city with whatever they could carry before Crema is looted and burnt to the ground. The expense of the siege (over 2,000 silver marks) and Frederick's determination to enforce it over the winter, demonstrates his ability to hold troops in the field and to keep his allies on side.
- May 18 – Erik IX Jedvardsson of Sweden is murdered, after which his murderer Magnus Henriksen proclaims himself king of Sweden as Magnus II. He is murdered in turn the following year, however. Erik is soon worshipped as a saint. Though never formally canonized by Pope Alexander III, he eventually becomes the patron saint of Sweden.
- November 2 – Betrothal of 5-year-old Henry the Young King of England and 2-year-old Marguerite, daughter of Louis VII of France; she brings Norman Vexin to the English crown as a dowry.
- November 13 – Within weeks of the death of his second wife, Queen Constance of Castile, King Louis VII of France marries Adela of Champagne, daughter of Count Theobald II ("the Great").
- A plot of land at Miholjanec is donated to the Knights Templar, who build a monastery in nearby Zdelia. This is the earliest historical mention of the Templars in Croatia and Hungary.
- Spital am Semmering (modern Austria) is founded by Margrave Ottokar III. He erects a hospital and completes the colonization of the area around the Traisen and Gölsen rivers.
- A large Portuguese offensive begins in the Alentejo region, against the Almoravids. The city of Tomar is founded by Gualdim Pais, Grand Master of the Knights Templar.
- The island of Lundy is granted to the Knights Templar by Henry II of England.

====== Levant ======
- Autumn – Raynald of Châtillon, prince of Antioch, makes a plundering raid in the valley of the Euphrates at Marash to seize cattle, horses and camels from the local peasants. On his way back to Antioch, he and his retinue are attacked by Zangid warriors. Raynald is unhorsed, captured and sent to Aleppo where he is put in jail.

====== Africa ======
- The Almohads conquer Mahdia (modern Tunisia) from the Normans after an important naval success near the city, against Christian reinforcements coming from Sicily.
- Approximate date – A commercial treaty between the Almohad Caliphate and the Republic of Pisa opens the North African ports to Tuscan merchants.

====== Asia ======
- In Japan, the Heiji Rebellion began with the siege of the Sanjō Palace.
- Emperor Dharanindravarman II dies and is succeeded by his cousin Yasovarman II as ruler of the Khmer Empire (modern Cambodia). Dharanindravarman's son Jayavarman VII goes into exile in neighboring Champa.

==== By topic ====
====== Education ======
- Approximate date – Derby School is founded by Walkelin de Derby in Derby (England); it will survive until 1989.

=== 1161 ===
==== By place ====
====== Byzantine Empire ======
- December 24 – The widowed Emperor Manuel I Komnenos marries Maria of Antioch, aged 16, at Hagia Sophia.

====== Europe ======
- February 3 – Battle of Oslo: King Inge I of Norway ("the Hunchback") is defeated and killed while fighting the forces of Haakon II ("the Broadshouldered") who succeeds Inge, with 5-year-old Magnus V as co-ruler, but not without challenges to his sovereignty.
- late summer/early autumn – Géza II of Hungary and the envoys of Pope Alexander III conclude the Concordat of 1161, by which Géza agrees to support the Pope in exchange for concessions.
- Magnus Henriksson, pretender to the throne of Sweden, is murdered by Charles VII, who becomes king of Sweden until 1167.
- An Almoravid offensive against the Kingdom of Portugal reaches the city of Almada, located on the Tagus river.

====== Asia ======
- Jin–Song Wars: The Battle of Tangdao (November 16) and Battle of Caishi (November 26–27) on the Yangtze River, between the Jin dynasty and the Song dynasty in China result in two pivotal Song naval victories.
- December 15 – Wanyan Liang, Chinese prince of Hailing, is assassinated while on campaign. He is succeeded by Emperor Shizong of Jin (until 1189).

==== By topic ====
====== Religion ======
- January 5 – Canonization of Edward the Confessor (d. 1066) in England.
- April 18 – Theobald of Bec, archbishop of Canterbury in England dies after an illness. King Henry II is informed and expresses the wish to have his friend Thomas Becket elected as the successor.
- after April 18 – Bartholomew is consecrated as bishop of Exeter in England (until 1184).
- The Cross of Saint Euphrosyne, commissioned by Euphrosyne of Polotsk in Belarus, is created by craftsman Lazar Bohsha. (It goes missing during World War II, and is not recovered subsequently).

=== 1162 ===
==== By place ====
====== Europe ======
- March 6 – German forces led by Frederick Barbarossa, Holy Roman Emperor, capture Milan; much of the city is destroyed three weeks later on the emperor's orders. The fortifications are demolished and the churches are destroyed. The population is dispersed, and the commune abolished. The fate of Milan leads to the submission of Brescia, Piacenza, and many other northern Italian cities.
- July 7 – Norwegian forces supporting 6-year-old Magnus V (Erlingsson) defeat the 15-year-old King Haakon II (Sigurdsson), who is killed in battle in Romsdal after a 5-year reign.
- July 15 – Ladislaus II, duke of Bosnia, is declared king of Hungary and Croatia. He is crowned by Archbishop Mikó and grants one-third of the kingdom to his brother, Stephen IV.

====== England ======
- June 3 – King Henry II has his chancellor Thomas Becket elected to succeed the late Theobald of Bec as archbishop of Canterbury. He accepts the pallium sent by Pope Alexander III.

====== Africa ======
- The Almohad emir, Abd al-Mu'min, prepares a gigantic fleet of some four hundred ships to invade Al-Andalus (modern Spain). He dies the following year, before the fleet is completed.

====== China ======
- July 24 – Emperor Gaozong of Song becomes embroiled in war again as hostilities resume with the Jurchen-led Jin dynasty (or "Great Jin") after 21 years of peace. Another peace treaty is signed, Gao abdicates the throne in favor of his adopted son Xiaozong. The smaller Southern Song empire becomes richer than the Song dynasty.

==== By topic ====
====== Religion ======
- The Beisi Pagoda (or North Temple Pagoda) is completed during the Song dynasty in China.

=== 1163 ===
- March/April (traditional date) – The first stone of the cathedral of Notre-Dame de Paris is set by Pope Alexander III during the reign of Louis VII of France.
- May 19 – Council of Tours opens. Albigensians are named and condemned as heretics.
- Owain Gwynedd becomes partial ruler of the Kingdom of Gwynedd in north Wales on the death of Gruffydd ap Rhys.
- Silesian duchies accept the suzerainty of the Holy Roman Empire.
- The Norwegian Law of Succession is introduced.
- The Guanfuchang salt-fields (官富場) in Hong Kong (modern-day To Kwa Wan, Kowloon Bay, Kwun Tong and Lam Tin districts) are first officially operated by the Song dynasty.
- Loccum Abbey in Hanover is founded as a Cistercian house, by abbot Ekkehard.
- The Thousand Pillar Temple is constructed by Rudra Deva in India.

=== 1164 ===
==== By place ====
====== Scotland ======
- Battle of Renfrew: A Norse-Gaelic army led by Lord Somerled, ruler of the Isles, invades Scotland and is routed by the Scottish forces under the command of Walter fitz Alan and Herbert of Selkirk, bishop of Glasgow.

====== England ======
- January 30 – King Henry II tries to delimit spiritual and royal jurisdictions in the Constitutions of Clarendon, written in large part by his councilor Richard de Luci.
- November 2 – Thomas Becket, having contended with Henry II over the power of secular courts, is found guilty of contempt of court, and exiled to France.

====== Levant ======
- Spring – Saladin accompanies his uncle, General Shirkuh, with an army sent to the Fatimid Caliphate (modern Egypt) by Nur al-Din, ruler (atabeg) of Syria.
- August 12 – Battle of Harim: Zangid forces under Nur al-Din defeat and capture Bohemond III of Antioch, Raymond of Tripoli, and Hugh of Lusignan.

====== Africa ======
- A commercial treaty grants access to Almohad-dominated ports to merchants from several European powers, including Marseille and Savona.

====== Asia ======
- September 14 – Emperor Sutoku of Japan dies in Sanuki Province (on the island of Shikoku), having lived in exile from the capital at Kyoto since 1156.

==== By topic ====
====== Markets ======
- Venice secures its loans against fiscal revenues, to obtain lower interest rates. In the first operation of this kind, the Republic obtains 1150 silver marci, for 12 years of the taxes levied on the Rialto market.

====== Religion ======
- April 20 – Antipope Victor IV dies at Rome and is succeeded by Paschal III, who has gained election through the influence of Archchancellor Rainald of Dassel.
- August 5 – Uppsala is recognized as the seat of the Swedish metropolitan, with the coronation of its first archbishop Stefan, by Pope Alexander III.
- King Olaf II of Norway is canonized as Saint Olaf by Alexander III, making him a universally recognised saint of the Catholic Church.
- Rainald of Dassel brings relics of the Three Magi from Milan to Cologne as a gift for Holy Roman Emperor Frederick Barbarossa.

=== 1165 ===
==== By place ====
====== Byzantine Empire ======
- Spring – Byzantine Emperor Manuel I Komnenos makes an alliance with Venice against Holy Roman Emperor Frederick Barbarossa, who takes an oath at the Diet of Würzburg to support Antipope Paschal III against Pope Alexander III.
- Andronikos I Komnenos, a cousin of Manuel I, escapes from prison at Constantinople. After passing through many dangers, he reaches Kyiv and seeks refuge at the court of Prince Yaroslav Osmomysl.

====== Europe ======
- October 15 – Battle of Fahs al-Jullab: Almohad forces defeat Ibn Mardanish, ruler of the Taifa of Murcia. His army is routed at a place called the "merchant field" near Alhama, in the valley of the Guadalentín.
- Reconquista – Gerald the Fearless, Portuguese warrior and adventurer, seizes the city of Évora by surprise. The same year (or soon after), he takes Cáceres, Trujillo, Montánchez, Moura, Monsaraz and Alconchel from the Almohads.
- Benjamin of Tudela, Spanish Jewish traveler, sets out on his journey from the northeast Iberian Peninsula (modern Spain), on a pilgrimage to the land of Israel and beyond.
- Otto II, Margrave of Meissen, grants Leipzig city and market privileges. The city is located at the crossways of the Via Regia and Via Imperii trade routes.

====== British Isles ======
- c. August – Battle of Crogen: Owain Gwynedd (Owain Fawr), ruler of the Kingdom of Gwynedd in north Wales, having formed an alliance with his nephew Rhys ap Gruffydd, prince of Deheubarth, to challenge English rule, defeats King Henry II of England and drives his army out of Wales.
- December 9 – King Malcolm IV of Scotland dies at Jedburgh after a 12-year reign and is succeeded by his brother William the Lion as ruler of Scotland (until 1214).
- Eleanor of Aquitaine, queen consort of England, spends most of the year in Anjou. Her husband, Henry II, begins an affair with "the Fair" Rosamund Clifford.

====== Asia ======
- January 30 – Closeted Emperor Go-Shirakawa holds an opening ceremony for the Sanjūsangen-dō, a temple built by Taira no Kiyomori in Japan.
- August 3 – Emperor Nijō of Japan abdicates the throne, dying soon after following a 7-year reign. He is succeeded by his 1-year-old son Rokujō as 79th emperor.
- In China the Jin dynasty ("Great Jin") and the Song dynasty make a lasting peace (until 1205).

==== By topic ====
====== Religion ======
- Eskil, Danish archbishop of Lund, appoints Fulco as the first Bishop of Estonia, marking the early beginning of the introduction of Christianity to the country. He will visit Estonia for the first time in 1169 or 1170.
- The construction of Liuhe Pagoda ("Six Harmonies Pagoda") in Hangzhou is completed in Song dynasty China.
- Approximate date – Hildegard of Bingen, German Benedictine abbess, founds Eibingen Abbey near Rüdesheim am Rhein.

=== 1166 ===
==== By place ====
====== Byzantine Empire ======
- Byzantine Emperor Manuel I Komnenos asks Venice to help pay the costs of defending Sicily, whose Norman rulers have had good relations with Venice. Doge Vitale II Michiel refuses to pay the requested subsidy. Manuel begins to cultivate relationships with the main commercial rivals of Venice: Genoa and Pisa. He grants them their own trade quarters in Constantinople, very near the Venetian settlements.

====== Europe ======
- May 7 – King William I ("the Wicked") of Sicily dies at Palermo after a 12-year reign. He is succeeded by his 12-year-old son William II ("the Good"), whose mother, Margaret of Navarre, will be regent until he comes of age.
- July 5 – The town of Bad Kleinkirchheim (in modern Austria) is first mentioned, in an ecclesiastical document, in which Archbishop Conrad II of Salzburg confirms the donation of a chapel, nearby Millstatt Abbey.
- Autumn – Holy Roman Emperor Frederick Barbarossa begins his fourth Italian campaign, hoping to secure the claim of Antipope Paschal III in Rome and the coronation of his wife Beatrice I, Countess of Burgundy, as Holy Roman Empress.
- Mieszko III the Old proclaims a Prussian crusade against the pagans and pressures the collaboration of Frederick I. He leaves Greater Poland in the hands of his younger brother Casimir II the Just.
- Henry the Lion, duke of Saxony, has the Brunswick Lion created at Dankwarderode Castle in Braunschweig (modern Germany). (Mentioned by Albert of Stade, a German abbot and chronicler, as the year of origin.)

====== British Isles ======
- Summer – Henry II of England invades and conquers Brittany to punish the local Breton barons. He grants the territory to his 7-year-old son Geoffrey.
- Henry II enacts the Assize of Clarendon, reforming English law, influential in the development of jury trial in common law countries worldwide.
- Cartae Baronum ("Charters of the Barons"), a survey commissioned by the English Treasury requiring each baron to declare how many knights he had enfeoffed.
- Muirchertach Mac Lochlainn, High King of Ireland, is killed. He is succeeded by Ruaidrí Ua Conchobair, king of Connacht, who defeats Diarmaid mac Murchadha (or Dermot, another ruler in eastern Ireland) in battle. Diarmaid is exiled and goes to Normandy and the court of King Henry II of England to ask for assistance in retaking his kingdom. Henry gives him permission to find a willing army from either England or Wales. Richard de Clare, 2nd Earl of Pembroke ("Strongbow") and his half-brothers Robert FitzStephen and Maurice FitzGerald, Lord of Lanstephan, agree to help Diarmaid mac Murchadha in return for Diarmaid's daughter's hand in marriage.
- Anglo-Norman soldier William Marshal is knighted while on campaign in Normandy; he will be described as "the greatest knight that ever lived".

=== 1167 ===
==== By place ====
====== Europe ======
- April 7 – Oath of Pontida: Supported by Pope Alexander III, the Lombard League is founded, a military alliance between the municipalities of Milan, Lodi, Ferrara, Piacenza and Parma, against the German invading forces of Emperor Frederick I (Barbarossa) in Northern Italy. The League (with other Italian cities) openly challenges Frederick's claim to power (Honor Imperii).
- April 12 – King Charles VII (Sverkersson) is murdered at Visingsö by supporters of Canute I (son of Eric IX), who proclaims himself king of Sweden. However, Charles's half-brothers Boleslaw and Kol Sverkerson proclaim themselves rulers of Östergötland, in opposition to Canute, which leads to fights for the power in Sweden (until 1173).
- May 29 – Battle of Monte Porzio: The army of the Commune of Rome is defeated by German forces under Frederick I and the local princes; Alexander III leaves Rome. Frederick proceeds to Rome, where he is crowned by Antipope Paschal III for the second time. A sudden outbreak of pestilence kills many of his advisors and knights.
- July 8 – Battle of Sirmium: Byzantine forces (15,000 men) under General Andronikos Kontostephanos defeat the Hungarians at Sirmium. Emperor Manuel I (Komnenos) consolidates his control over the western Balkans.
- August – Frederick I claims imperial authority over Bohemia, Greater Poland and Hungary. He installs his 3-year-old son Frederick V as duke of Swabia, after Frederick's cousin, Frederick IV, dies of disease at Rome.

====== Egypt ======
- March 18 – Battle of Al-Babein: A second Zangid army (some 12,000 men) under General Shirkuh and his nephew Saladin marches towards Egypt, but is met by the combined Crusader-Fatimid forces led by King Amalric of Jerusalem. After skirmishing down the Nile, the Crusaders are defeated near Giza and forced to retreat to Cairo.
- May–June – Saladin leads the defence of Alexandria against the Crusader-Fatimid forces. He takes command over the garrison (plus some 1,000 cavalry), and the army's sick and wounded.
- August 4 – Amalric I accepts a peace treaty and enters Alexandria at the head of the Crusader army. Saladin and his troops are escorted out with full military honours, and retreats to Syria.
- Probable date – Battle of Pantina: The Byzantines intervene on behalf of Grand Prince Tihomir of Serbia against his rebellious brother, Prince Stefan Nemanja, who defeats the Byzantine forces and becomes Grand Župan of Serbia.

====== Ireland ======
- Diarmaid mac Murchadha (or Dermot), former king of Leinster, returns to Ireland with an advance party of Flemings under Richard fitz Godbert de Roche.

====== England ======
- King Henry II prohibits English students from attending the University of Paris; many settle at the University of Oxford.

====== Asia ======
- Taira no Kiyomori becomes the first samurai to be appointed Daijo Daijin, chief minister of the government of Japan.

==== By topic ====
====== Religion ======
- Absalon, Danish archbishop and statesman, leads the first synod at Lund. He is granted land around the city of "Havn" (modern-day Copenhagen) and fortifies the coastal defence against the Wends.

=== 1168 ===
==== By place ====
====== Levant ======
- Summer – King Amalric I of Jerusalem and Byzantine emperor Manuel I Komnenos negotiate an alliance against Fatimid-Egypt. Archbishop William of Tyre is among the ambassadors sent to Constantinople to finalize the treaty.
- Autumn – William IV, Count of Nevers, arrives in Palestine with a contingent of elite knights. In Jerusalem he is present during a council with Amalric and other nobles to decide on an expedition to Egypt.
- October 20 – Amalric I invades Egypt again from Ascalon, sacking Bilbeis and threatening Cairo. In November, a Crusader fleet sails up the Nile and arrives in Lake Manzala, sacking the town of Tanis.
- Nur al-Din, Zangid ruler (atabeg) of Aleppo, sends an expedition under General Shirkuh to Egypt on request of the Fatimid caliph Al-Adid. He offers him a third of the land, and fiefs for his generals.

====== Egypt ======
- December 22 – Afraid that the Egyptian capital Fustat (modern-day Old Cairo) will be captured by Crusader forces, its Fatimid vizier, Shawar, orders the city set afire. The capital burns for 54 days.

====== Europe ======
- March 27 – Patrick of Salisbury, Angevin governor of Poitou, is killed in an ambush at Poitiers by French forces under Guy of Lusignan. He is escorting Queen Eleanor of Aquitaine on a journey near the border of Aquitaine. Patrick's nephew, William Marshal, is part of the royal escort and is taken prisoner. Later he is ransomed and becomes a member of Eleanor's household.
- King Valdemar I ("the Great") of Denmark conquers the Wendish capital at Arkona on the island of Rügen (modern Germany). The Wends become Christians and subject to Danish suzerainty.
- Henry the Lion, duke of Saxony, marries the 12-year-old Matilda (or Maud), daughter of King Henry II of England.
- The newly born Commune of Rome conquers and destroys the rival neighboring city of Albano (modern Italy).
- Stephen du Perche, Sicilian chancellor, is accused of plotting to claim the throne and is forced to flee.

====== Asia ======
- April 9 – Emperor Rokujō of Japan is deposed by his grandfather, retired-Emperor Go-Shirakawa, after an 8-month reign. He is succeeded by his 6-year-old uncle, Takakura, as the 80th emperor.
- Yuanqu County (also known as Wanting County) in China is destroyed by a flood of the Yellow River.

==== By topic ====
====== Religion ======
- September 20 – Antipope Paschal III dies at Rome after a 4-year reign. Giovanni di Struma is elected as his successor and will reign as Antipope Callixtus III with support from Emperor Frederick I.

=== 1169 ===
==== By place ====
====== Byzantine Empire ======
- Late Summer – Emperor Manuel I Komnenos sends an embassy to Egypt to demand tribute, and threatens the country with war when they refuse to pay it. The Byzantine fleet under Admiral Andronikos Kontostephanos sets out from the Hellespont; 60 war galleys are sent to Palestine with money for "the knights of Jerusalem". Andronikos with the rest of the fleet sails to Cyprus, at which he defeats a patrolling squadron of 6 Fatimid ships.

====== Europe ======
- Spring – Gerald the Fearless, Portuguese warrior and knight, receives the support of King Afonso I ("the Great"). The Almohad caliph, Abu Yaqub Yusuf, manages to broker an alliance with King Ferdinand II against Afonso. The allies manage to besiege Badajoz, and finally take both Afonso and Gerald prisoner.
- King Henry II of England and Louis VII sign a peace treaty which includes the betrothal of their respective heirs, the 11-year-old Richard I and the 8-year-old Alys of France (or Alice).
- Andrey Bogolyubsky, Grand Prince of Vladimir-Suzdal, sacks Kiev (with help from allies) and makes Vladimir the capital of Kievan Rus'. He installs relatives on the throne at Kiev.
- During the Swedish power struggle, Boleslaw is killed, but his brother Kol continues as ruler of Östergötland (until 1173), in opposition to King Knut Eriksson of Sweden.
- February 4 – 1169 Sicily earthquake: An earthquake with an estimated magnitude of around 7 strikes the eastern coast of Sicily, causing an estimated 15,000 deaths.
- Stephen III of Hungary concludes a concordat with Pope Alexander III, renouncing his right of investiture.

====== England ======
- Henry II makes an effort to end the strife between him and his wife, Queen Eleanor of Aquitaine, in order that he may dally in western Herefordshire with his mistress, Rosamund Clifford, the daughter of Walter de Clifford. He divides the succession to his kingdom among his four sons, Henry the Young King, Richard I, Geoffrey II and John.

====== Ireland ======
- May – Norman invasion of Ireland: Anglo-Norman mercenaries land at the request of deposed King Diarmaid mac Murchadha (Dermot). Among those arriving is Richard de Clare (a vassal of Henry II), who has made an alliance with exiled Diarmaid mac Murchadha to help him regain the throne of Leinster. This begins the period of Anglo-Norman dominance of Ireland.

====== Egypt ======
- Spring – A Zangid expedition under General Shirkuh accompanied by his nephew Saladin invades Egypt. King Amalric I of Jerusalem orders his fleet to return to Acre and retreats with the Crusaders back to Palestine.
- January 8 – Shirkuh enters Cairo, leaving the Zangid army encamped outside the city. He goes to the palace, where the 18-year-old Fatimid caliph Al-Adid welcomes him with ceremonial gifts and promised money.
- January 18 – Shawar, Fatimid vizier and de facto ruler, is invited to join Shirkuh on a pilgrimage to the tomb of Al-Shafi'i. Underway he and his escort are taken prisoner; on orders from Al-Adid, Shawar is decapitated.
- March 23 – Shirkuh dies from over-eating after a 2-month reign. He is succeeded by Saladin, who is appointed chief vizier of the Fatimid Caliphate. He takes over as commander of Nur al-Din's forces in Egypt.
- Summer – Saladin invites his brother Turan-Shah to join him in Cairo. He brings his family and retinue with him but also a substantial army provided by Nur al-Din. Turan-Shah is welcomed by Al-Adid as a friend.
- August 21–23 – At the Battle of the Blacks, Saladin crushes a rebellion by Sudanese forces (50,000 men) of the Fatimid army, along with a number of Egyptian emirs and commoners. He never again has to face a military uprising from Cairo.
- Winter – Saladin supported by reinforcements from Nur al-din, defeats a Crusader-Byzantine force under Amalric I near Damietta. During the 3-month siege, the Crusaders are forced to retreat to Palestine.

==== By topic ====
====== Art and Science ======
- Eleanor of Aquitaine leaves the English court of Henry II, to establish her own court in Poitiers. It will become known as a center of courtly love. Richard I accompanies his mother and is made heir to Aquitaine.

== Significant people ==
- Al-Mustanjid caliph of Baghdad
- Pope Alexander III
- Al-Adid last Fatimid caliph

== Births ==
1160

- October 4 – Alys of France, daughter of Louis VII (d. 1220)
- December 3 – Conrad of Querfurt, German bishop (d. 1202)
- Abu Yusuf Yaqub al-Mansur, Almohad caliph (d. 1199)
- Adolf III, count of Schaumburg and Holstein (d. 1225)
- Alice of Courtenay, French noblewoman (d. 1218)
- Ali ibn al-Athir, Arab historian and biographer (d. 1233)
- Azriel of Gerona, Catalan Jewish leader (d. 1238)
- Beatrice of Viennois, countess of Savoy (d. 1230)
- Bertold V, German nobleman (House of Zähringen) (d. 1218)
- Cadenet, French poet and troubadour (approximate date)
- David Kimhi, French rabbi and grammarian (d. 1235)
- Dulce of Aragon, queen of Portugal (d. 1198)
- Eschiva of Ibelin, queen of Cyprus (d. 1196)
- Eudokia Komnene, French noblewoman (d. 1203)
- Hartmann I, count of Württemberg (d. 1240)
- Isaac the Blind, French rabbi and writer (d. 1235)
- John of Hexham, English chronicler (d. 1209)
- John of Matha, French priest and saint (d. 1213)
- Konoe Motomichi, Japanese nobleman (d. 1233)
- Ma Yuan, Chinese landscape painter (d. 1225)
- Mestwin I, duke of Pomerania (approximate date)
- Parisius (or Parisio), Italian priest and saint (d. 1267)
- Philip the Chancellor, French theologian (d. 1236)
- Rudolph I, count palatine of Tübingen (d. 1219)
- Sasaki Takatsuna, Japanese samurai (d. 1214)
- Sibylla (or Sibylle), queen of Jerusalem (d. 1190)
- Siraj al-Din al-Sakaki, Persian scholar (d. 1229)
- Taira no Koremori, Japanese general (d. 1184)
- Taira no Noritsune, Japanese nobleman (d. 1185)
- Tamar the Great, queen of Georgia (approximate date)
- Vladislaus III, duke of Bohemia (approximate date)

1161

- February 22 – Innocent III, pope of the Catholic Church (d. 1216)
- September 20 – Takakura, emperor of Japan (d. 1181)
- Alfonso Téllez de Meneses, Spanish nobleman (d. 1230)
- Baldwin IV ("the Leper"), king of Jerusalem (d. 1185)
- Beatrice of Albon, duchess of Burgundy (d. 1228)
- Belgutei, half-brother of Genghis Khan (d. 1271)
- Börte, wife of Genghis Khan (approximate date)
- Constance, duchess of Brittany (approximate date)
- Da'ud Abu al-Fadl, Ayyubid physician (d. 1242)
- Eleanor of England, queen of Castile (d. 1214)
- Guðmundur Arason, Icelandic bishop (d. 1237)
- Sancho, Count of Provence (or Sanche), Spanish nobleman (d. 1223)
- Sasaki Yoshikiyo, Japanese nobleman (d. 1242)
- Satō Tadanobu, Japanese samurai (d. 1186)
- Tsangpa Gyare, Tibetan Buddhist leader (d. 1211)

1162

- March 5 – Ogasawara Nagakiyo, Japanese warrior (d. 1242)
- March 11 – Theodoric I, margrave of Meissen (d. 1221)
- June 20 – Benchō, Japanese Buddhist patriarch (d. 1238)
- June 30 – Yang (or Gongsheng), Chinese empress (d. 1233)
- Abd al-Latif al-Baghdadi, Abbasid traveler and writer (d. 1231)
- Fujiwara no Teika, Japanese poet and calligrapher (d. 1241)
- Gebre Mesqel Lalibela, ruler of the Ethiopian Empire (d. 1221)
- Genghis Khan, founder of the Mongol Empire (d. 1227)
- Geoffrey Fitz Peter, 1st Earl of Essex (approximate date)
- Guillem de Cabestany, Spanish troubadour (d. 1212)
- Kajiwara Kagesue, Japanese nobleman (d. 1200)
- Renier of Montferrat, Byzantine politician (d. 1183)

1163

- August 19 – Ottokar IV of Styria (d. 1192)
- Ban Kulin, ruler of Bosnia (d. 1204)
- Canute VI of Denmark (d. 1202)
- Hōjō Yoshitoki, Kamakura regent (d. 1224)
- As-Salih Ismail al-Malik, ruler of Syria (d. 1181)
- Ibn al-Qabisi, Iraqi grammarian and poet (d. 1235)

1164

- July 16 – Frederick V, son of Frederick Barbarossa
- December 28 – Rokujō, emperor of Japan (d. 1176)
- Fulk of Pavia, Italian prelate and bishop (d. 1229)
- Hatakeyama Shigetada, Japanese samurai (d. 1205)
- Ibn Tumlus, Moorish scholar and physician (d. 1223)
- Isabel de Bolebec, English noblewoman (d. 1245)
- Shi Miyuan, Chinese official and politician (d. 1233)

1165

- July 28 – Ibn Arabi, Andalusian philosopher (d. 1240)
- August 21 – Philip II, king of France (d. 1223)
- October – Joan of England, queen consort of Sicily (d. 1199)
- November – Henry VI, Holy Roman Emperor (d. 1197)
- Blacatz, French knight and troubadour (d. 1237)
- Jean de Montmirail, French nobleman and Cistercian monk (d. 1217)
- Philippe du Plessis, French Grand Master (d. 1209)
- Han (or Gogshu), Chinese empress (d. 1200)
- Lady Shizuka Gozen, Japanese court dancer (d. 1211)
- Theobald Walter, 1st Chief Butler of Ireland, Anglo-Norman High Sheriff (d. 1206)
- Approximate date
  - Albéric Clément, 1st Marshal of France (d. 1191)
  - Albert, German-born bishop of Riga (d. 1229)
  - Jean Bodel, French poet and writer (d. 1210)
  - Conrad III of Scharfenberg, German cleric and bishop (d. 1224)
  - Henry I ("the Brave"), duke of Brabant (d. 1235)
  - Henry the Bearded, High Duke of Poland (d. 1238)
  - Hermann von Salza, German nobleman, Grand Master of the Teutonic Knights (d. 1239)
  - Renaud I, Count of Dammartin (Reginald of Boulogne), French nobleman (d. 1227)
  - Ruben II (or Roupen), Armenian prince (d. 1170)
  - Waleran III (or Walram), duke of Limburg (d. 1226)
  - William the Breton, French chronicler (d. 1225)

1166

- February 24 – Al-Mansur Abdallah, Zaidi imam (d. 1217)
- July 29 – Henry II, Count of Champagne (Henry I, King of Jerusalem) (d. 1197)
- December 24 – John, king of England (d. 1216)
- Abu al-Abbas al-Nabati, Andalusian Moorish pharmacist (d. 1239)
- Arnold of Altena, German nobleman (d. 1209)
- Ch'oe U, Korean general and dictator (d. 1249)
- Judah ben Isaac Messer Leon, French rabbi (b. 1224)
- Odo III (or Eudes), duke of Burgundy (d. 1218)
- Shunten (Shunten-Ō), Ryukyu ruler of Okinawa (d. 1237)
- Wansong Xingxiu, Chinese Buddhist monk (d. 1246)
- Approximate date
  - Alan IV ("the Young"), viscount of Rohan, Morbihan (d. 1205)
  - Humphrey IV, lord of Toron
  - Philip d'Aubigny, Anglo-Norman knight and courtier (d. 1236)
  - William de Warenne, 5th Earl of Surrey, English nobleman (d. 1240)

1167

- February – Frederick VI, duke of Swabia (d. 1191)
- Anders Sunesen, archbishop of Lund (d. 1228)
- Warin II (the Younger), Norman knight (d. 1218)
- William I, count of Holland (Low Countries) (d. 1222)

1168

- April 22 – Abubakar ibn Gussom, Arab poet (d. 1242)
- August 31 – Emperor Zhangzong of Jin, Chinese ruler (d. 1208)
- November 19 – Emperor Ningzong, Chinese ruler (d. 1224)
- Ibn Muti al-Zawawi, Arab jurist and philologian (d. 1231)
- Robert of Braybrooke, English High Sheriff (d. 1210)
- Robert of Courtenay, Lord of Champignelles, French nobleman and knight (d. 1239)
- Temüge (or Otgon), brother of Genghis Khan (d. 1246)
- William de Ferrers, 4th Earl of Derby (approximate date)

1169

- September 10 – Alexios II Komnenos, Byzantine emperor (d. 1183)
- Ahi Evren, Bektashi Sufi preacher and philosopher (d. 1261)
- Al-Afdal ibn Salah ad-Din, Ayyubid ruler of Damascus (d. 1225)
- Eustace de Vesci, English nobleman and military leader (d. 1216)
- Ibn al-Mustawfi, Ayyubid governor and historian (d. 1239)
- Fujiwara no Yoshitsune, Japanese nobleman (d. 1206)
- Muhammad II, Khwarezmid viceroy and ruler (d. 1220)
- Nasu no Yoichi, Japanese samurai (approximate date)
- Taira no Atsumori, Japanese samurai (d. 1184)

== Deaths ==
1160

- March 12 – Al-Muqtafi, caliph of the Abbasid Caliphate (b. 1096)
- April 3 – William FitzAlan, Breton nobleman (b. 1105)
- April 27 – Rudolf I, count of Bregenz and Chur (b. 1081)
- May 18
  - Erik IX Jedvardsson ("the Holy"), king of Sweden (b. 1120)
  - Ibn al-Qalanisi, Arab politician and chronicler
- May 31 – Mechtildis of Edelstetten, German abbess
- July 23 – Al-Fa'iz bi-Nasr Allah, Fatimid caliph (b. 1149)
- October 4 – Constance of Castile, queen of France (b. 1141)
- December 17 – Gilla na Naemh Ua Duinn, Irish poet (b. 1102)
- December 22 – Fujiwara no Nariko, Japanese empress (b. 1117)
- Dharanindravarman II, Cambodian ruler of the Khmer Empire
- Fujiwara no Michinori, Japanese nobleman (b. 1106)
- Fujiwara no Nobuyori, Japanese nobleman (b. 1133)
- Gonzalo Fernández de Traba, Galician nobleman
- Helena of Skövde, Swedish noblewoman and saint
- Herman III, Margrave of Baden ("the Great"), German nobleman (b. 1105)
- Herman of Carinthia, German astronomer (b. 1100)
- Hugh Candidus, English monk and historian (b. 1095)
- Ibn Quzman, Andalusian poet and writer (b. 1087)
- Mahsati, Persian female poet and writer (b. 1089)
- Minamoto no Tomonaga, Japanese samurai (b. 1144)
- Minamoto no Yoshihira, Japanese nobleman (b. 1140)
- Minamoto no Yoshitomo, Japanese general (b. 1123)
- Niklot, Obotrite prince (House of Mecklenburg) (b. 1090)
- Peter Lombard, French bishop and theologian (b. 1096)
- Philip of France, French prince and archdeacon (b. 1132)
- Raymond du Puy, French knight and Grand Master (b. 1083)
- Robert I (Nostell), Norman churchman and prior (b. 1100)
- Sophie of Winzenburg, German noblewoman (b. 1105)

1161

- February 3 – Inge I ("the Hunchback"), king of Norway (b. 1135)
- April 18 – Theobald of Bec, archbishop of Canterbury (b. 1090)
- May 12 – Fergus of Galloway, Scottish nobleman
- June 14 – Qinzong, Chinese emperor (b. 1100)
- September 10 – Tala'i ibn Ruzzik, Fatimid vizier
- September 11 – Melisende, queen of Jerusalem (b. 1105)
- October 12 – Henry V, duke of Carinthia (House of Sponheim)
- October 28 – Imar of Tusculum, French abbot and bishop
- November 21 – William III, count of Nevers and Auxerre
- November 23 – Adam of Ebrach, German monk and abbot
- December 15 – Wanyan Liang, Chinese emperor (b. 1122)
- Akarius Fitz Bardolph, English nobleman and knight
- Hu Hong, Chinese scholar and philosopher (b. 1105)
- Magnus Henriksson, king of Sweden (b. 1130)
- Rechung Dorje Drakpa, Tibetan Buddhist leader
- Roger IV, duke of Apulia and Calabria (b. 1152)

1162

- February 18 – Theotonius, Portuguese advisor (b. 1082)
- May 31 – Géza II, king of Hungary and Croatia (b. 1130)
- July 7 – Haakon II (Sigurdsson), king of Norway (b. 1147)
- July 29 – Guigues V, count of Albon and Grenoble (b. 1125)
- July 31 – Fujiwara no Tadazane, Japanese nobleman (b. 1078)
- August 6 – Ramon Berenguer IV, count of Barcelona (b. 1114)
- September 27 – Odo II, duke of Burgundy (b. 1118)
- Adalbert of Pomerania, German missionary and bishop
- Angharad ferch Owain, queen consort of Gwynedd (b. 1065)
- Odo of Deuil (or Eudes), French abbot and historian
- Henry Aristippus (or Henricus), Italian chancellor
- Hugh de Morville, Constable of Scotland, Norman nobleman and knight
- Ibn Zuhr (or Avenzoar), Moorish physician (b. 1094)
- Judith of Baden, German margravine
- Richard de Belmeis II, English bishop and politician
- Sylvester of Marsico, Norman nobleman (b. 1100)
- Tiantong Zongjue, Chinese Buddhist monk (b. 1091)

1163

- January 14 – King Ladislaus II of Hungary (b. 1131)
- February 10 – King Baldwin III of Jerusalem (b. 1130)
- May – Abd al-Mu'min, founder of the Almohad Empire (b. 1094)
- August 10 – Dahui Zonggao, Chinese Zen Buddhist monk (b. 1089)
- date unknown – Constance of Antioch, ruler of Antioch (b. 1127) - or possibly early 1164

1164

- January 30 – William of Anjou, viscount of Dieppe (b. 1136)
- March 13 – Fujiwara no Tadamichi, Japanese regent (b. 1097)
- April 20 – Victor IV, antipope of Rome (b. 1095)
- May 16 – Héloïse, French scholar and abbess
- May 19 – Bashnouna, Egyptian monk and martyr
- June 18 – Elisabeth of Schönau, German abbess
- September 4 – Henry II, prince-bishop of Liège
- September 14 – Sutoku, emperor of Japan (b. 1119)
- November 11 – Hugh of Amiens, French archbishop
- December 23 – Hartmann of Brixen, German bishop (b. 1090)
- December 31 – Ottokar III, margrave of Styria (b. 1124)
- Herbert of Selkirk, Scottish bishop and chancellor
- Hodierna of Jerusalem, countess of Tripoli (b. 1110)
- Ortlieb of Zwiefalten, German Benedictine abbot
- Zhang Jun, Chinese grand chancellor (b. 1097)

1165

- January 24 – William of Ypres, Flemish nobleman (b. 1090)
- February 7 – Stephen of Armenia, Armenian nobleman (b. 1111)
- March 27 – Awn al-Din ibn Hubayra, Abbasid vizier (b. 1105)
- April 11
  - Ibn al-Tilmidh, Arab physician and calligrapher (b. 1074)
  - Stephen IV, king of Hungary and Croatia (b. 1133)
- July 22 – John Marshal (or FitzGilbert), Marshal of England (b. 1105)
- September 5 – Nijō, emperor of Japan (b. 1143)
- December 9 – Malcolm IV, king of Scotland (b. 1141)
- Adalgott of Disentis, German abbot and bishop
- Goswin of Anchin, Flemish Benedictine abbot (b. 1086)
- Gottfried of Admont, German Benedictine abbot
- Helias de Say (or Hellias), Anglo-Norman nobleman
- Muhammad al-Idrisi, Arab geographer (b. 1100)
- Rostislav Glebovich, Kievan prince of Minsk
- Sibylla of Anjou, countess consort of Flanders (b. 1112)

1166

- February 21 – Abdul Qadir Gilani, Persian preacher (b. 1078)
- April 9 – Waleran de Beaumont, English nobleman (b. 1104)
- May 7 – William I ("the wicked"), king of Sicily (b. 1120)
- August 23 – Konoe Motozane, Japanese nobleman (b. 1143)
- October 12 – Henry I, duke of Wiślica
- Ahmad Yasawi, Turkic Sufi religious leader (b. 1093)
- Athanasius VII bar Qatra, Syrian patriarch of Antioch
- Fujiwara no Motozane, Japanese waka poet (b. 1143)
- Gillamaire Ua Conallta, Irish poet and Chief Ollam
- Grigor III Pahlavuni, Armenian catholicos of Cilicia (b. 1093)
- Muirchertach Mac Lochlainn, High King of Ireland
- Rosalia, Norman-Sicilian noblewoman, hermit and saint (b. 1130)

1167

- January 12 – Aelred of Rievaulx, English abbot (b. 1110)
- February 27 – Robert of Melun, bishop of Hereford (b. 1100)
- April 12 – Charles VII (Sverkersson), king of Sweden (b. 1130)
- July 13 – Xia (Shenfu), Chinese empress consort (b. 1136)
- August
  - Děpold I, Bohemian prince (epidemic)
  - Frederick IV, duke of Swabia (epidemic)
  - Henry I, count of Nassau (epidemic)
  - Henry II, duke of Limburg (epidemic)
- August 14 – Rainald of Dassel, German archbishop (b. 1120)
- August 17 – Nicolò Politi, Italian monk and hermit (b. 1117)
- August 22 – Relindis of Hohenburg, French abbess
- September 10 – Matilda, Holy Roman Empress (b. 1102)
- Abraham ibn Ezra, Spanish philosopher (approximate date)
- Alaungsithu, Burmese king of the Pagan Dynasty (b. 1090)
- Basava, Indian philosopher and statesman (b. 1105)
- Christian I (the Quarrelsome), count of Oldenburg
- Euphrosyne of Polotsk, Kievan princess (b. 1104)
- Hugh of Poitiers, French monk and chronicler
- Occo of Schleswig (or Ogge), Danish bishop
- Raymond I (or Raimond), French nobleman
- Rostislav I, Grand Prince of Kiev (b. 1110)

1168

- January 17 – Thierry of Alsace, count of Flanders (b. 1099)
- March 27 – Patrick of Salisbury, Norman nobleman (b. 1122)
- April 5 – Robert de Beaumont, English nobleman (b. 1104)
- September 20 – Paschal III, antipope of Rome (b. 1110)
- October 24 – William IV, count of Auxerre and Nevers
- November 5 – Hugh IX of Lusignan, French nobleman
- Abu al-Najib Suhrawardi, Persian scholar (b. 1097)
- Bermudo Pérez de Traba, Spanish nobleman (b. 1088)
- Conrad of Babenberg, archbishop of Salzburg (b. 1115)
- Wivina, French Benedictine abbess and saint (b. 1103)

1169

- January 13 – Bertrand de Blanchefort, French Grand Master
- January 18 – Shawar, Fatimid vizier and de facto ruler
- February 4 – John of Ajello, Italian bishop of Catania
- February 6 – Thoros II ("the Great"), prince of Armenia
- March 23 – Shirkuh, Zangid general and chief vizier
- May 21 – Berthold of Zwiefalten, German abbot
- July 9 – Guido of Pisa, Italian geographer
- Abu'l-Hasan Bayhaqi, Persian polymath
- Basil bar Shumna, archbishop of Edessa
- Bohemond II, Italian count of Manoppello
- Boleslaw, Swedish co-ruler of Östergötland
- Gerhoh of Reichersberg, German theologian
- Hilary of Chichester, English bishop (b. 1110)
- Hillin of Falmagne, German archbishop
- Luke Chrysoberges, Byzantine patriarch
- Mujir al-Din Abaq, governor of Damascus
- Otomae, Japanese female singer (b. 1085)
- Ramiro Fróilaz, Leonese military leader
- Stephen du Perche, Sicilian chancellor
