= 1164 =

1164 in various calendars
- Gregorian calendar: 1164; MCLXIV
- Ab urbe condita: 1917
- Armenian calendar: 613; ԹՎ ՈԺԳ
- Assyrian calendar: 5914
- Balinese saka calendar: 1085–1086
- Bengali calendar: 570–571
- Berber calendar: 2114
- English Regnal year: 10 Hen. 2 – 11 Hen. 2
- Buddhist calendar: 1708
- Burmese calendar: 526
- Byzantine calendar: 6672–6673
- Chinese calendar: 癸未年 (Water Goat); 3861 or 3654 — to — 甲申年 (Wood Monkey); 3862 or 3655
- Coptic calendar: 880–881
- Discordian calendar: 2330
- Ethiopian calendar: 1156–1157
- Hebrew calendar: 4924–4925
- Hindu calendars
- Vikram Samvat: 1220–1221
- Shaka Samvat: 1085–1086
- Kali Yuga: 4264–4265
- Holocene calendar: 11164
- Igbo calendar: 164–165
- Iranian calendar: 542–543
- Islamic calendar: 559–560
- Japanese calendar: Chōkan 2 (長寛２年)
- Javanese calendar: 1070–1072
- Julian calendar: 1164; MCLXIV
- Korean calendar: 3497
- Minguo calendar: 748 before ROC 民前748年
- Nanakshahi calendar: −304
- Seleucid era: 1475/1476 AG
- Thai solar calendar: 1706–1707
- Tibetan calendar: ཆུ་མོ་ལུག་ལོ་ (female Water-Sheep); 1290 or 909 or 137 — to — ཤིང་ཕོ་སྤྲེ་ལོ་ (male Wood-Monkey); 1291 or 910 or 138

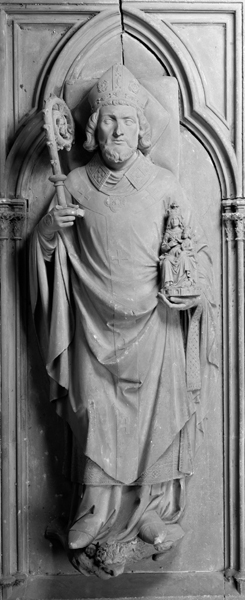
Rainald of Dassel (c. 1120–1167)

Year 1164 (MCLXIV) was a leap year starting on Wednesday of the Julian calendar.

== Events ==
=== By place ===
==== Scotland ====
- Battle of Renfrew: A Norse-Gaelic army led by Lord Somerled, ruler of the Isles, invades Scotland and is routed by the Scottish forces under the command of Walter fitz Alan and Herbert of Selkirk, bishop of Glasgow.

==== England ====
- January 30 – King Henry II tries to delimit spiritual and royal jurisdictions in the Constitutions of Clarendon, written in large part by his councilor Richard de Luci.
- November 2 – Thomas Becket, having contended with Henry II over the power of secular courts, is found guilty of contempt of court, and exiled to France.

==== Levant ====
- Spring – Saladin accompanies his uncle, General Shirkuh, with an army sent to the Fatimid Caliphate (modern Egypt) by Nur al-Din, ruler (atabeg) of Syria.
- August 12 – Battle of Harim: Zangid forces under Nur al-Din defeat and capture Bohemond III of Antioch, Raymond of Tripoli, and Hugh of Lusignan.

==== Africa ====
- A commercial treaty grants access to Almohad-dominated ports to merchants from several European powers, including Marseille and Savona.

==== Asia ====
- September 14 – Emperor Sutoku of Japan dies in Sanuki Province (on the island of Shikoku), having lived in exile from the capital at Kyoto since 1156.

=== By topic ===
==== Markets ====
- Venice secures its loans against fiscal revenues, to obtain lower interest rates. In the first operation of this kind, the Republic obtains 1150 silver marci, for 12 years of the taxes levied on the Rialto market.

==== Religion ====
- April 20 – Antipope Victor IV dies at Rome and is succeeded by Paschal III, who has gained election through the influence of Archchancellor Rainald of Dassel.
- August 5 – Uppsala is recognized as the seat of the Swedish metropolitan, with the coronation of its first archbishop Stefan, by Pope Alexander III.
- King Olaf II of Norway is canonized as Saint Olaf by Alexander III, making him a universally recognised saint of the Catholic Church.
- Rainald of Dassel brings relics of the Three Magi from Milan to Cologne as a gift for Holy Roman Emperor Frederick Barbarossa.

== Births ==
- July 16 – Frederick V, son of Frederick Barbarossa
- December 28 – Emperor Rokujō of Japan (d. 1176)
- Fulk of Pavia, Italian prelate and bishop (d. 1229)
- Hatakeyama Shigetada, Japanese samurai (d. 1205)
- Ibn Tumlus, Moorish scholar and physician (d. 1223)
- Isabel de Bolebec, English noblewoman (d. 1245)
- Shi Miyuan, Chinese official and politician (d. 1233)

== Deaths ==
- January 30 – William of Anjou, viscount of Dieppe (b. 1136)
- March 13 – Fujiwara no Tadamichi, Japanese regent (b. 1097)
- April 20 – Victor IV, antipope of Rome (b. 1095)
- May 16 – Héloïse, French scholar and abbess
- May 19 – Bashnouna, Egyptian monk and martyr
- June 18 – Elisabeth of Schönau, German abbess
- September 4 – Henry II, prince-bishop of Liège
- September 14 – Sutoku, emperor of Japan (b. 1119)
- November 11 – Hugh of Amiens, French archbishop
- December 23 – Hartmann of Brixen, German bishop (b. 1090)
- December 31 – Ottokar III, margrave of Styria (b. 1124)
- Herbert of Selkirk, Scottish bishop and chancellor
- Hodierna of Jerusalem, countess of Tripoli (b. 1110)
- Ortlieb of Zwiefalten, German Benedictine abbot
- Zhang Jun, Chinese grand chancellor (b. 1097)
