= 1163 =

1163 in various calendars
- Gregorian calendar: 1163; MCLXIII
- Ab urbe condita: 1916
- Armenian calendar: 612; ԹՎ ՈԺԲ
- Assyrian calendar: 5913
- Balinese saka calendar: 1084–1085
- Bengali calendar: 569–570
- Berber calendar: 2113
- English Regnal year: 9 Hen. 2 – 10 Hen. 2
- Buddhist calendar: 1707
- Burmese calendar: 525
- Byzantine calendar: 6671–6672
- Chinese calendar: 壬午年 (Water Horse); 3860 or 3653 — to — 癸未年 (Water Goat); 3861 or 3654
- Coptic calendar: 879–880
- Discordian calendar: 2329
- Ethiopian calendar: 1155–1156
- Hebrew calendar: 4923–4924
- Hindu calendars
- Vikram Samvat: 1219–1220
- Shaka Samvat: 1084–1085
- Kali Yuga: 4263–4264
- Holocene calendar: 11163
- Igbo calendar: 163–164
- Iranian calendar: 541–542
- Islamic calendar: 558–559
- Japanese calendar: Ōhō 3 / Chōkan 1 (長寛元年)
- Javanese calendar: 1069–1070
- Julian calendar: 1163; MCLXIII
- Korean calendar: 3496
- Minguo calendar: 749 before ROC 民前749年
- Nanakshahi calendar: −305
- Seleucid era: 1474/1475 AG
- Thai solar calendar: 1705–1706
- Tibetan calendar: ཆུ་ཕོ་རྟ་ལོ་ (male Water-Horse); 1289 or 908 or 136 — to — ཆུ་མོ་ལུག་ལོ་ (female Water-Sheep); 1290 or 909 or 137

Year 1163 (MCLXIII) was a common year starting on Tuesday of the Julian calendar.

== Events ==
- March / April (traditional date) – The first stone of the cathedral of Notre-Dame de Paris is set by Pope Alexander III during the reign of Louis VII of France.
- May 19 – Council of Tours opens. Albigensians are named and condemned as heretics.
- Owain Gwynedd becomes partial ruler of the Kingdom of Gwynedd in north Wales on the death of Gruffydd ap Rhys.
- The Norwegian Law of Succession is introduced.
- The Guanfuchang salt-fields (官富場) in Hong Kong (modern-day To Kwa Wan, Kowloon Bay, Kwun Tong and Lam Tin districts) are first officially operated by the Song dynasty.
- Egyptian military commander Shawar appointed Vizier of Egypt for a second term.
- Loccum Abbey in Hanover is founded as a Cistercian house, by abbot Ekkehard.
- The Thousand Pillar Temple is constructed by Rudra Deva in India.

== Births ==
- August 19 – Ottokar IV of Styria (d. 1192)
- Isabella, Countess of Gloucester, queen consort of England (d. 1217) (approximate date)
- Ban Kulin, ruler of Bosnia (d. 1204)
- Canute VI of Denmark (d. 1202)
- Hōjō Yoshitoki, Kamakura regent (d. 1224)
- As-Salih Ismail al-Malik, ruler of Syria (d. 1181)
- Ibn al-Qabisi, Iraqi grammarian and poet (d. 1235)

== Deaths ==
- January 14 – King Ladislaus II of Hungary (b. 1131)
- February 10 – King Baldwin III of Jerusalem (b. 1130)
- May – Abd al-Mu'min, founder of the Almohad Empire (b. 1094)
- August 10 – Dahui Zonggao, Chinese Zen Buddhist monk (b. 1089)
- date unknown – Constance of Antioch, ruler of Antioch (b. 1127) - or possibly early 1164
