= 1233 =

1233 in various calendars
- Gregorian calendar: 1233; MCCXXXIII
- Ab urbe condita: 1986
- Armenian calendar: 682; ԹՎ ՈՁԲ
- Assyrian calendar: 5983
- Balinese saka calendar: 1154–1155
- Bengali calendar: 639–640
- Berber calendar: 2183
- English Regnal year: 17 Hen. 3 – 18 Hen. 3
- Buddhist calendar: 1777
- Burmese calendar: 595
- Byzantine calendar: 6741–6742
- Chinese calendar: 壬辰年 (Water Dragon); 3930 or 3723 — to — 癸巳年 (Water Snake); 3931 or 3724
- Coptic calendar: 949–950
- Discordian calendar: 2399
- Ethiopian calendar: 1225–1226
- Hebrew calendar: 4993–4994
- Hindu calendars
- Vikram Samvat: 1289–1290
- Shaka Samvat: 1154–1155
- Kali Yuga: 4333–4334
- Holocene calendar: 11233
- Igbo calendar: 233–234
- Iranian calendar: 611–612
- Islamic calendar: 630–631
- Japanese calendar: Jōei 2 / Tenpuku 1 (天福元年)
- Javanese calendar: 1142–1143
- Julian calendar: 1233; MCCXXXIII
- Korean calendar: 3566
- Minguo calendar: 679 before ROC 民前679年
- Nanakshahi calendar: −235
- Thai solar calendar: 1775–1776
- Tibetan calendar: ཆུ་ཕོ་འབྲུག་ལོ་ (male Water-Dragon); 1359 or 978 or 206 — to — ཆུ་མོ་སྦྲུལ་ལོ་ (female Water-Snake); 1360 or 979 or 207

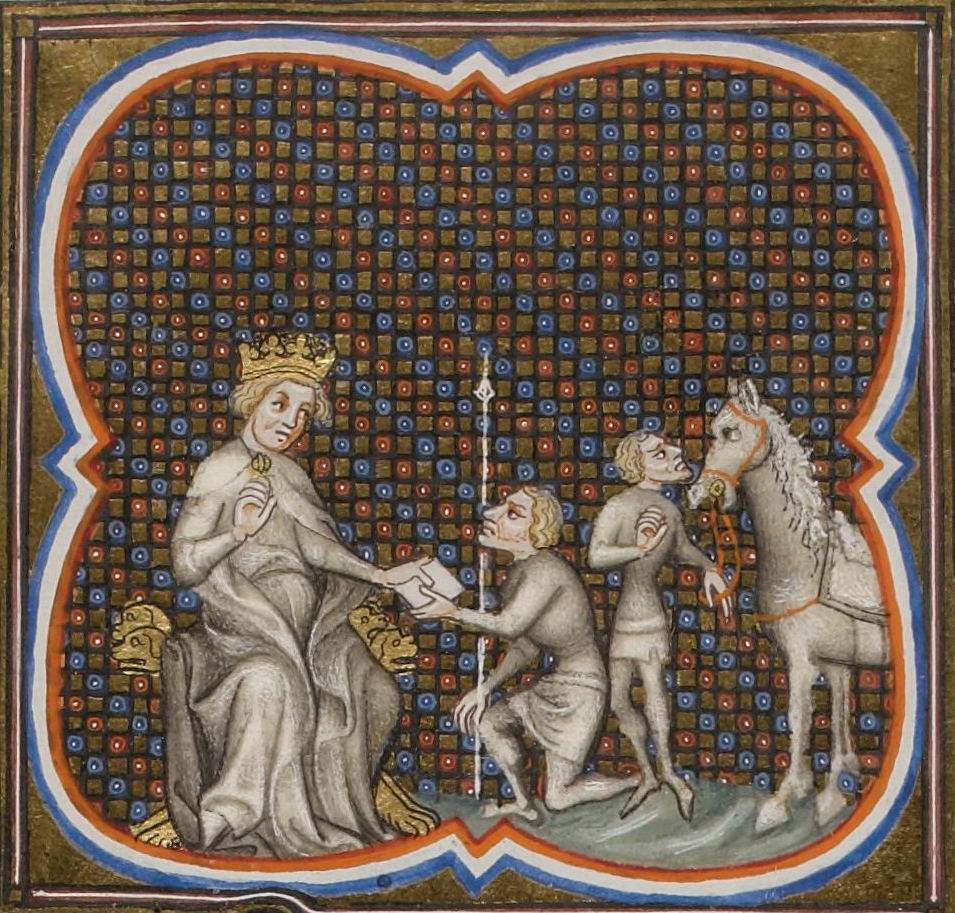
Henry I of Cyprus receives a message

Year 1233 (MCCXXXIII) was a common year starting on Saturday of the Julian calendar.

== Events ==
=== By place ===
==== Europe ====
- War of the Lombards: Lombard forces at Kyrenia surrender to John of Beirut, after a 10-month siege. The defenders, with their personal belongings, are allowed to retire to Tyre. Captured prisoners are exchanged for those held by Richard Filangieri, commander of the Lombards, at Tyre. Cyprus is wholly restored under the rule of the 16-year-old King Henry I ("the Fat"). His vassals are rewarded, and loans that they have made are repaid.
- August 20 – Oath of Bereg: King Andrew II of Hungary vows to the Holy See that he will not employ Jews and Muslims to administer royal revenues, which causes diplomatic complaints and ecclesiastical censures.
- Winter – Reconquista: King Ferdinand III of Castile ("the Saint") conquers the cities of Trujillo and Úbeda. The Castilian army besieges the city of Peniscola. Ferdinand forces Ibn Hud, ruler of the Taifa of Zaragoza, to sign a truce.

==== England ====
- August – Richard Marshal, 3rd Earl of Pembroke, signs an alliance with Llywelyn the Great, to join forces to revolt against King Henry III. Richard is faced by demands from royal bailiffs in September – where the garrison of Usk Castle is forced to surrender.
- November – Henry III's army camped at Grosmont Castle is attacked in the night, by a force of Welsh and English rebels. Several of Henry's supporters are captured, and the castle is returned to Hubert de Burgh, Earl of Kent, one of the rebels.

==== Mongol Empire ====
- May 29 – Mongol–Jin War: The Mongol army led by Ögedei Khan captures Kaifeng, capital of the Jin dynasty ('Great Jin'), after the 13-month Siege of Kaifeng (1232). The Mongols plunder the city, while Emperor Aizong of Jin flees for the town of Caizhou. Meanwhile, Ögedei departs and leaves the final conquest to his favoured general, Subutai.
- December – Siege of Caizhou: The Mongols under Ögedei Khan besiege Caizhou and ally themselves with the Chinese Song dynasty to eliminate the Jin Dynasty.

=== By topic ===
==== Cities and Towns ====
- Gendt receives its city rights from Otto II ("the Lame"), count of Guelders (modern Netherlands).

==== Religion ====
- Pope Gregory IX establishes the Papal Inquisition, to regularize the persecution of heresy.

== Births ==
- June/July – Ibn Manzur, Arab lexicographer and writer (d. 1312)
- August 15 – Philip Benizi de Damiani, Italian religious leader (d. 1285)
- October – Al-Nawawi, Syrian scholar, jurist and writer (d. 1277)
- Adelaide of Burgundy, duchess of Brabant (d. 1273)
- Choe Ui, Korean military leader and dictator (d. 1258)
- Ibn al-Quff, Ayyubid physician and surgeon (d. 1286)
- Sancho of Castile, archbishop of Toledo (d. 1261)

== Deaths ==
- January 6 – Matilda of Chester, Countess of Huntingdon (or Maud), English noblewoman (b. 1171)
- January 18 – Yang (or Gongsheng), Chinese empress (b. 1162)
- February 12 – Ermengarde de Beaumont, queen of Scotland
- March 1 – Thomas I (or Tommaso), count of Savoy (b. 1178)
- May – Simon of Joinville, French nobleman and knight (b. 1175)
- June – Yolanda de Courtenay, queen consort of Hungary
- July 8 – Konoe Motomichi, Japanese nobleman (b. 1160)
- July 26 – Wilbrand of Oldenburg, prince-bishop of Utrecht
- July 27 – Ferdinand (or Ferrand), count of Flanders (b. 1188)
- July 29 – Savari de Mauléon, French nobleman (b. 1181)
- July 30 – Konrad von Marburg, German priest (b. 1180)
- October 8 – Ugo Canefri, Italian health worker (b. 1148)
- October 22 – Fujiwara no Shunshi, Japanese empress consort (b. 1209)
- November 22 – Helena, duchess of Brunswick-Lüneburg
- November 27 – Shi Miyuan, Chinese politician (b. 1164)
- Ibn al-Athir, Seljuk historian and biographer (b. 1160)
- Bertran de Born lo Filhs, French troubadour (b. 1179)
- Bohemond IV ("the One-Eyed"), prince of Antioch (b. 1175)
- Gökböri ("Blue-Wolf"), Ayyubid general and ruler (b. 1154)
- Guillén Pérez de Guzmán, Spanish nobleman (b. 1180)
- John Apokaukos, Byzantine bishop and theologian
- Mathilde of Angoulême, French noblewoman (b. 1181)
- Sayf al-Din al-Amidi, Ayyubid scholar and jurist (b. 1156)
- William Comyn, Scoto-Norman nobleman (b. 1163)
