= 1247 =

1247 in various calendars
- Gregorian calendar: 1247; MCCXLVII
- Ab urbe condita: 2000
- Armenian calendar: 696; ԹՎ ՈՂԶ
- Assyrian calendar: 5997
- Balinese saka calendar: 1168–1169
- Bengali calendar: 653–654
- Berber calendar: 2197
- English Regnal year: 31 Hen. 3 – 32 Hen. 3
- Buddhist calendar: 1791
- Burmese calendar: 609
- Byzantine calendar: 6755–6756
- Chinese calendar: 丙午年 (Fire Horse); 3944 or 3737 — to — 丁未年 (Fire Goat); 3945 or 3738
- Coptic calendar: 963–964
- Discordian calendar: 2413
- Ethiopian calendar: 1239–1240
- Hebrew calendar: 5007–5008
- Hindu calendars
- Vikram Samvat: 1303–1304
- Shaka Samvat: 1168–1169
- Kali Yuga: 4347–4348
- Holocene calendar: 11247
- Igbo calendar: 247–248
- Iranian calendar: 625–626
- Islamic calendar: 644–645
- Japanese calendar: Kangen 5 / Hōji 1 (宝治元年)
- Javanese calendar: 1156–1157
- Julian calendar: 1247; MCCXLVII
- Korean calendar: 3580
- Minguo calendar: 665 before ROC 民前665年
- Nanakshahi calendar: −221
- Thai solar calendar: 1789–1790
- Tibetan calendar: མེ་ཕོ་རྟ་ལོ་ (male Fire-Horse); 1373 or 992 or 220 — to — མེ་མོ་ལུག་ལོ་ (female Fire-Sheep); 1374 or 993 or 221

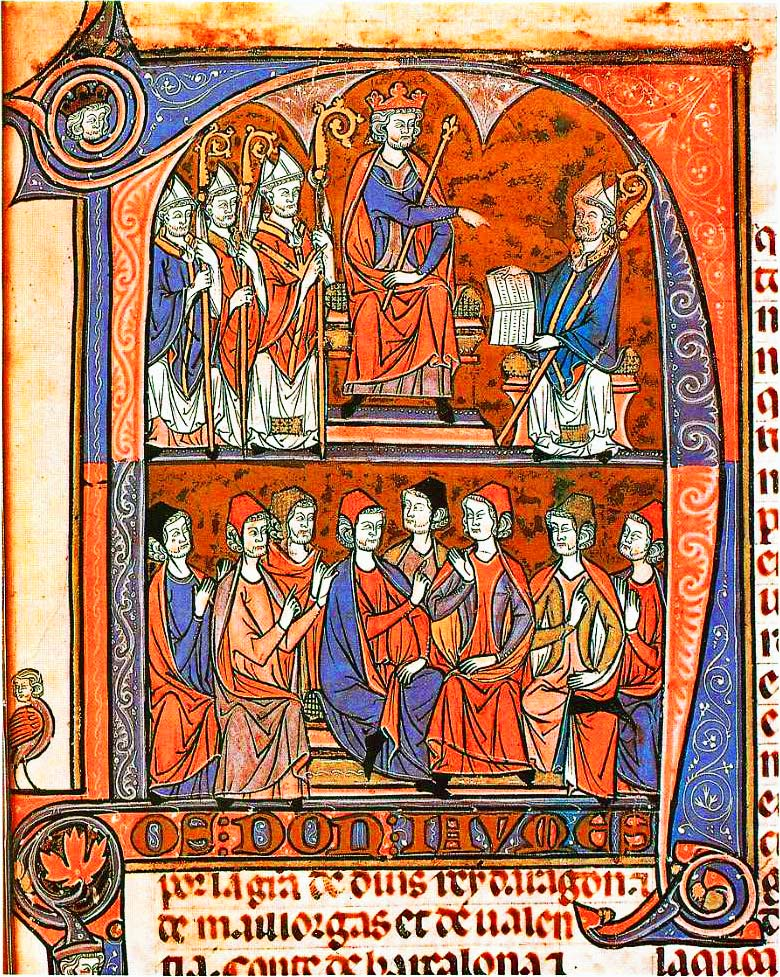
King James I of Aragon (above) during a council led by the bishop of Huesca.

Year 1247 (MCCXLVII) was a common year starting on Tuesday of the Julian calendar.

== Events ==
=== By place ===
==== Europe ====
- War of the Thuringian Succession: The claims on the Ludovingians' inheritance after the death of Henry Raspe, landgrave of Thuringia, leads to a dispute over the succession territories of Thuringia and Hesse, between his niece Sophie of Thuringia and her cousin Henry III ("the Illustrious"), who claim the territories as fiefs of the Electorate of Mainz.
- Rome becomes 2,000 years old.
- July 2 – King Béla IV grants territories to the Knights Hospitaller in the Banate of Severin and Hungarian Cumania (according to a document called the Diploma of the Joannites), makes an early mention of Litovoi and other Vlach/Romanian local rulers, in Wallachia and Transylvania.
- Summer – Siege of Seville: Castilian forces under King Ferdinand III ("the Saint") begin to besiege Seville, the city is isolated and Ramón de Bonifaz sails with 13 galleys up the Guadalquivir River to scatter some 40 smaller Almohad ships trying to oppose him (with many destroyed).
- December 1 – A rebellion arises among the Muslim subjects in the region of Valencia. As a punishment, King James I of Aragon ("the Conqueror"), issues an order of expulsion of the Muslims from his realm, leading numerous people into exile in Andalusia and North Africa.

==== Levant ====
- June 17 – Egyptian forces under Sultan As-Salih Ayyub capture Tiberias and his castle. Mount Tabor and Belvoir Castle are occupied soon afterward. Next, Ayyub moves his army to siege Ascalon – which is defended by a garrison of Knights Hospitaller. They summon the help from Acre and Cyprus.
- Summer – King Henry I ("the Fat") sends a Cypriot squadron of 8 galleys with 100 knights led by Baldwin of Ibelin, to Acre. With the support of the Italian colonists, they fitted out 7 more galleys and some 50 lighter ships, to relieve the siege at Ascalon – which is now blockaded by the Egyptian fleet.
- The Egyptian fleet (some 20 galleys) confronts the Crusader ships led by Baldwin of Ibelin at Ascalon. But before contact is made, it is caught in a sudden Mediterranean storm. Many of the Muslim ships are driven ashore and wrecked; the survivors sail back to Egypt.
- October 15 – Egyptian forces under As-Salih Ayyub capture Ascalon by surprise – while a battering-ram forces a passageway under the walls right into the citadel. Most of the defenders are massacred, and the remainder of the garrison is taken prisoner.

==== British Isles ====
- Battle of Ballyshannon: Norman forces under Maurice FitzGerald defeat a Gaelic army near Ballyshannon in northern Ireland. After the battle, the entire country of Donegal is devastated and plundered by the Normans.
- The Bethlem Royal Hospital is founded in London during the reign of King Henry III.
- Romford (located within Greater London) is chartered as a market town.

==== Asia ====
- The Hōjō clan under Hōjō Tokiyori destroys the Miura family; and in doing so, the clan consolidates its authority as regents in Japan.

=== By topic ===
==== Mathematics ====
- Qin Jiushao, Chinese mathematician, writes the Mathematical Treatise in Nine Sections.

==== Medicine ====
- Song Ci publishes the Collected Cases of Injustice Rectified, a book considered to be the first monographic work on forensic medicine.

== Births ==
- Angelo da Clareno, Italian priest and religious leader (d. 1337)
- Isabella of Aragon, queen consort of France (d. 1271) (approximate date)
- Isabelle of Luxembourg, countess of Flanders (d. 1298)
- John II Avesnes, count of Hainaut and Holland (d. 1304)
- John of Montecorvino, Italian diplomat and bishop (d. 1328)
- Philippe de Rémi, French official and seneschal (d. 1296)
- Rashid al-Din, Persian statesman and historian (d. 1318)
- Robert FitzWalter, 1st Baron FitzWalter, English nobleman and knight (d. 1326)
- Todros ben Judah Halevi Abulafia, Castilian Jewish poet
- Yishan Yining, Chinese monk and calligrapher (d. 1317)
- Yolande of Nevers, French noblewoman (d. 1280)

== Deaths ==
- February 12 – Ermesinde, countess of Luxembourg (b. 1186)
- February 16 – Henry Raspe, landgrave of Thuringia (b. 1204)
- February 25 – Henry IV, duke of Limburg (House of Limburg)
- May 9 – Richard de Bures, French knight and Grand Master
- June 10 – Rodrigo Jiménez de Rada, Spanish bishop (b. 1170)
- July 8 – Mōri Suemitsu, Japanese nobleman and samurai (b. 1202)
- August 31 – Konrad I of Masovia, Polish nobleman (House of Piast)
- November 5 – Ogasawara Nagatsune, Japanese samurai (b. 1179)
- December 21 – Roger of Salisbury, bishop of Bath and Wells
- December 24 – Shōkū, Japanese Buddhist disciple (b. 1177)
- unknown date – Śārṅgadeva, Indian scholar, musicologist and writer (b. 1175)
- probable – William de Ferrers, 4th Earl of Derby, English nobleman and knight (b. 1168)
