= Constance of Castile =

Constance of Castile may refer to:

- Constance of Castile, Queen of France (died 1160), daughter of Alfonso VII of Castiel and wife of Louis VII of France
- Constance of Castile (died 1242), daughter of Alfonso VIII of Castile
- Constance of Castile (died 1280), daughter of Alfonso X of Castile
- Constanza Manuel (died 1345), daughter of Juan Manuel and wife of Alfonso XI of Castile and Peter I of Portugal
- Constance of Castile, Duchess of Lancaster (1354–1394), daughter of Peter of Castile and wife of John of Gaunt, claimant to the throne of Castile
- Constance of Castile (died 1478), granddaughter of Peter of Castile and abbess of Santo Domingo el Real en Madrid
