= 1235 =

1235 in various calendars
- Gregorian calendar: 1235; MCCXXXV
- Ab urbe condita: 1988
- Armenian calendar: 684; ԹՎ ՈՁԴ
- Assyrian calendar: 5985
- Balinese saka calendar: 1156–1157
- Bengali calendar: 641–642
- Berber calendar: 2185
- English Regnal year: 19 Hen. 3 – 20 Hen. 3
- Buddhist calendar: 1779
- Burmese calendar: 597
- Byzantine calendar: 6743–6744
- Chinese calendar: 甲午年 (Wood Horse); 3932 or 3725 — to — 乙未年 (Wood Goat); 3933 or 3726
- Coptic calendar: 951–952
- Discordian calendar: 2401
- Ethiopian calendar: 1227–1228
- Hebrew calendar: 4995–4996
- Hindu calendars
- Vikram Samvat: 1291–1292
- Shaka Samvat: 1156–1157
- Kali Yuga: 4335–4336
- Holocene calendar: 11235
- Igbo calendar: 235–236
- Iranian calendar: 613–614
- Islamic calendar: 632–633
- Japanese calendar: Bunryaku 2 / Katei 1 (嘉禎元年)
- Javanese calendar: 1144–1145
- Julian calendar: 1235; MCCXXXV
- Korean calendar: 3568
- Minguo calendar: 677 before ROC 民前677年
- Nanakshahi calendar: −233
- Thai solar calendar: 1777–1778
- Tibetan calendar: ཤིང་ཕོ་རྟ་ལོ་ (male Wood-Horse); 1361 or 980 or 208 — to — ཤིང་མོ་ལུག་ལོ་ (female Wood-Sheep); 1362 or 981 or 209

Year 1235 (MCCXXXV) was a common year starting on Monday of the Julian calendar.

== Events ==
- Connacht in Ireland is finally conquered by the Hiberno-Norman Richard Mór de Burgh; Felim Ua Conchobair is expelled.
- A general inquisition begins in France.
- Siege of Constantinople: The Byzantine emperor John III Doukas Vatatzes and the Bulgarian tsar Ivan Asen II besiege Constantinople in an attempt to take it from its Latin rulers, John of Brienne and Baldwin II. Angelo Sanudo successfully negotiates a two-year truce.
- Elizabeth of Hungary (d. 1231) is canonized by Pope Gregory IX.
- A Chinese text of this year records that Hangzhou City, the capital of the Song dynasty, has various social clubs that include a West Lake Poetry Club, the Buddhist Tea Society, the Physical Fitness Club, the Anglers' Club, the Occult Club, the Young Girls' Chorus, the Exotic Foods Club, the Plants and Fruits Club, the Antique Collectors' Club, the Horse-Lovers' Club, and the Refined Music Society.
- Probable date – Lancaster Royal Grammar School is founded in the north of England.
- Approximate date – Battle of Kirina: Mandinka prince Sundiata Keita defeats Sosso king Soumaoro Kanté, beginning the Mali Empire. By tradition, the Manden Charter, a constitution, is proclaimed in Kouroukan Fouga.

== Births ==
- November 2 – Henry of Almain, King of the Romans (d. 1271)
- probable
  - Pope Boniface VIII (approximate date; d. 1303)
  - Ramon Llull, Catalan writer and philosopher (d. 1315)
  - Arnold of Villanova, Spanish alchemist and physician (d. 1311)
  - Qian Xuan, Chinese painter (d. 1305)

== Deaths ==
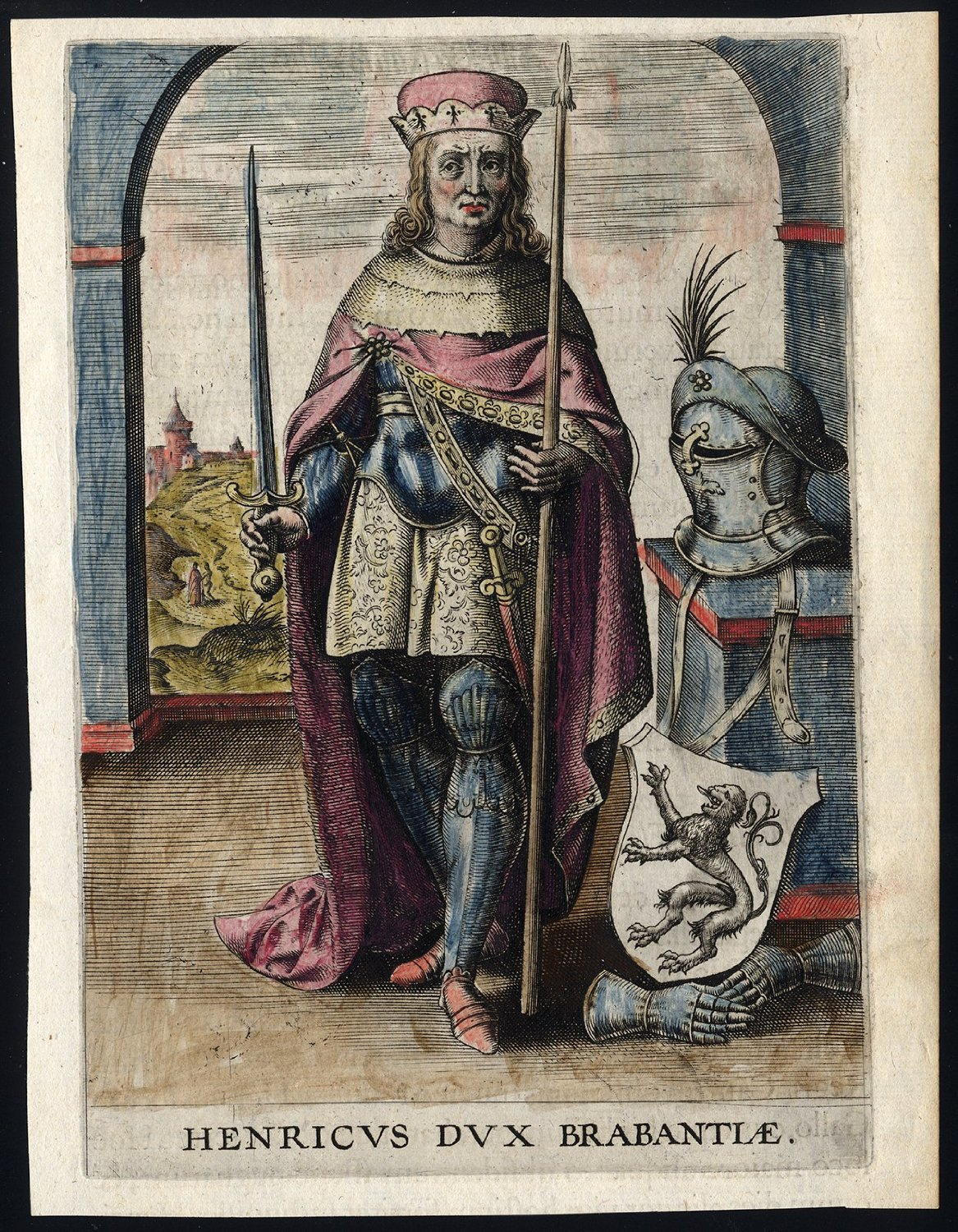
Henry I of Brabant

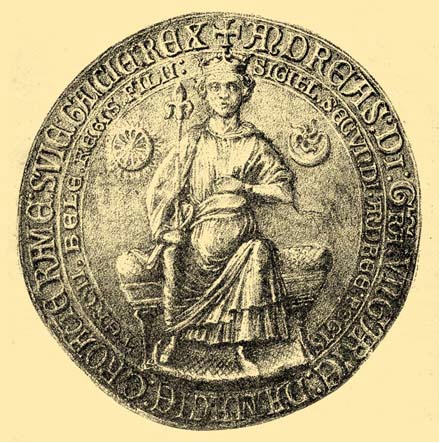
King Andrew II of Hungary

- September 5 – Duke Henry I of Brabant (b. 1165)
- September 21 – King Andrew II of Hungary (b. 1175)
- November 5 – Elisabeth of Swabia, queen consort of Castile and León (b. 1205)
- date unknown
  - Andronikos I Gidos, Emperor of Trebizond
  - Ibn al-Qabisi, Iraqi linguist (b. 1163)
  - Rabbi David Kimhi, French Biblical commentator (b. 1160)
