= Da'ud Abu al-Fadl =

Karaite Jewish physician and scholar

Da'ud Abu al-Fadl (1161–1242) was a Karaite Jewish physician who lived in Ayyubid Egypt in the twelfth century CE. He was born in Cairo in 1161 and died there about 1242. Having studied medicine under the Jewish physician Hibat Allah ibn Jami, and under Abu al-Fafa'il ibn Naqid, he became the court physician of the sultan al-Malik al-'Adil Abu Bakr ibn Ayyub, the brother and successor of Saladin. He was also chief professor at the al-Nasiri Hospital at Cairo, where he had a great many pupils, among them being the historian Ibn Abi Usaibiyyah. The latter declared that Abu al-Fadl was the most skillful physician of the time and that his success in curing the sick was miraculous. Abu al-Fadl was the author of an Arabic pharmacopoeia in twelve chapters, entitled Aḳrabadhin, treating chiefly of antidotes.

== Sources ==
Kohler, Kaufmann and M. Seligsohn. "Fadl, Daud Abu al-". Jewish Encyclopedia. Funk and Wagnalls, 1901–1906, citing:

- Ibn Abi Usaibi'ah, Uyun al-Anha' fi Ṭabaḳat al-Aṭibba', ed. Aug. Müller, ii. 118–119, Königsberg, 1884:
- Carmoly, in Revue Orientale, i. 418;
- Steinschneider, Jewish Literature, pp. 195, 366, note 16a;
  - idem, Bibl. Arab.-Jud. § 154.
