= Constanza de Castilla =

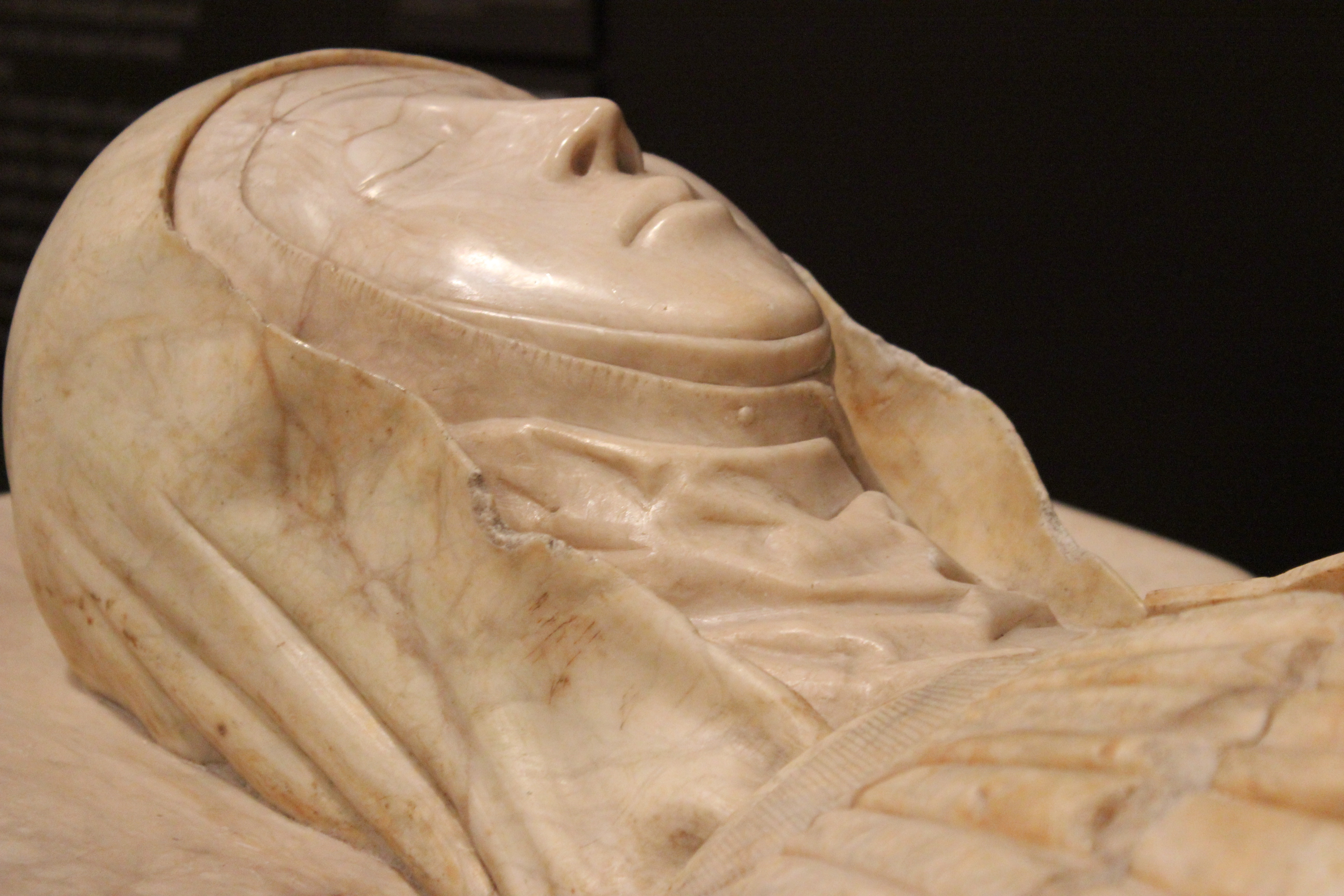
Detail of the face from the tomb of Constanza de Castilla

Constanza de Castilla (c. 1400 – 1478) was a Castilian royal woman, Dominican nun and spiritual writer.

== Life ==
Constanza was born between 1395 and 1405 in the castle of Soria. Her father was Juan de Castilla, son of King Peter of Castile and Juana de Castro. She was her father's eldest daughter. In 1369, following Peter's defeat and death in the Castilian Civil War, Juan went into exile. In 1388, Juan's niece, Catherine of Lancaster, another potential claimant, married King Henry III to resolve the disputed succession. As part of this settlement, Juan returned to live as a prisoner in Soria, where he married the daughter of his jailer, Elvira de Eril y Falces, who became the mother of Constanza.

Constanza's elder brother, Pedro, was a potential claimant to the throne. In the even that he was neutralized, Constanza or her future husband could stake a claim. Henry III sought to eliminate this threat, but Catherine intervened to spare her cousins. Both, however, were forced to enter the religious life. Constanza entered the convent of Santo Domingo el Real in Madrid at a young age in about 1406.

By 1416, Constanza had become prioress of Santo Domingo, probably through the influence of the queen. She was apparently exempted from the vows of enclosure, or communal dining and sleeping and of the habit. She regularly moved about Madrid, Toledo and wherever the royal court was staying. She was part of a circle of spiritual women around Queen Catherine, including Inés de Torres, Teresa de Ayala and Leonor López de Córdoba. Her royal connections assured Santo Domingo of generous patronage. She began construction of a new refectory and cloisters. She completed the main chapel. She also sought to rehabilitate her family's reputation. She ensepulchred her father and her grandfather in the main chapel in 1442 and 1446, respectively. She retired as prioress in 1465 on account of her age. She died, probably at Santo Domingo, in 1478. Her own tomb is now in the National Museum of Archaeology in Madrid.

== Works ==
Start of the Libro de devociones y oficios in the only surviving manuscript

Constanza was, with Leonor López de Córdoba and Teresa de Cartagena, one of the first women to write in Spanish. Her Libro de devociones y oficios (also called Devocionario or Devocio y oficios) survives in a single manuscript, now Madrid, Biblioteca Nacional de España, MS 7495. It was written between 1454 and 1474. It consists of a collection of texts, some of them original and others translated from Latin, all intended for the nuns of Santo Domingo. Among them are:

- Oración
- Oficium incarnacionis
- Siete angustias
- Letanía de Nuestra Señora
- Los quince gozos
- Oras de los clavos

The Libro de devociones y oficios has been published under the English title Book of Devotions.

== Bibliography ==
- Baldridge, Mary (2012). "Constanza de Castilla: Prayer on the Life and Passion of Christ". Magistra. 18 (1): 62–95.
- Curto Hernández, María Victoria (2026). "Constanza de Castilla". In Michelle M. Sauer; Diane Watt; Liz Herbert McAvoy (eds.). The Palgrave Encyclopedia of Medieval Women's Writing in the Global Middle Ages. Palgrave Macmillan. pp. 219–221.
- Piera, Montserrat (2019). Women Readers and Writers in Medieval Iberia: Spinning the Text. Brill.
- Salazar y Acha, Jaime de (2021). Las dinastías reales de España en la Edad Media (PDF). Real Academia de la Historia.
- Surtz, Ronald E. (2022). "Castilla, Constanza de". Diccionario Biográfico Español. Real Academia de la Historia.
- Wilkins, Constance L., ed. (1998). Book of Devotions: Libro de devociones y oficios. University of Exeter Press.
