= 1204 =

1204 in various calendars
- Gregorian calendar: 1204; MCCIV
- Ab urbe condita: 1957
- Armenian calendar: 653; ԹՎ ՈԾԳ
- Assyrian calendar: 5954
- Balinese saka calendar: 1125–1126
- Bengali calendar: 610–611
- Berber calendar: 2154
- English Regnal year: 5 Joh. 1 – 6 Joh. 1
- Buddhist calendar: 1748
- Burmese calendar: 566
- Byzantine calendar: 6712–6713
- Chinese calendar: 癸亥年 (Water Pig); 3901 or 3694 — to — 甲子年 (Wood Rat); 3902 or 3695
- Coptic calendar: 920–921
- Discordian calendar: 2370
- Ethiopian calendar: 1196–1197
- Hebrew calendar: 4964–4965
- Hindu calendars
- Vikram Samvat: 1260–1261
- Shaka Samvat: 1125–1126
- Kali Yuga: 4304–4305
- Holocene calendar: 11204
- Igbo calendar: 204–205
- Iranian calendar: 582–583
- Islamic calendar: 600–601
- Japanese calendar: Kennin 4 / Genkyū 1 (元久元年)
- Javanese calendar: 1112–1113
- Julian calendar: 1204; MCCIV
- Korean calendar: 3537
- Minguo calendar: 708 before ROC 民前708年
- Nanakshahi calendar: −264
- Thai solar calendar: 1746–1747
- Tibetan calendar: ཆུ་མོ་ཕག་ལོ་ (female Water-Boar); 1330 or 949 or 177 — to — ཤིང་ཕོ་བྱི་བ་ལོ་ (male Wood-Rat); 1331 or 950 or 178

Year 1204 (MCCIV) was a leap year starting on Thursday of the Julian calendar.

== Events ==
- January 27–28 – Byzantine emperor Alexios IV Angelos is overthrown in a revolution.
- February 21–23 – A large solar storm takes place, and is recorded in Meigetsuki, the diary of the Japanese poet Fujiwara no Sadaie.
- February 5 – Alexios V Doukas is crowned Byzantine emperor.
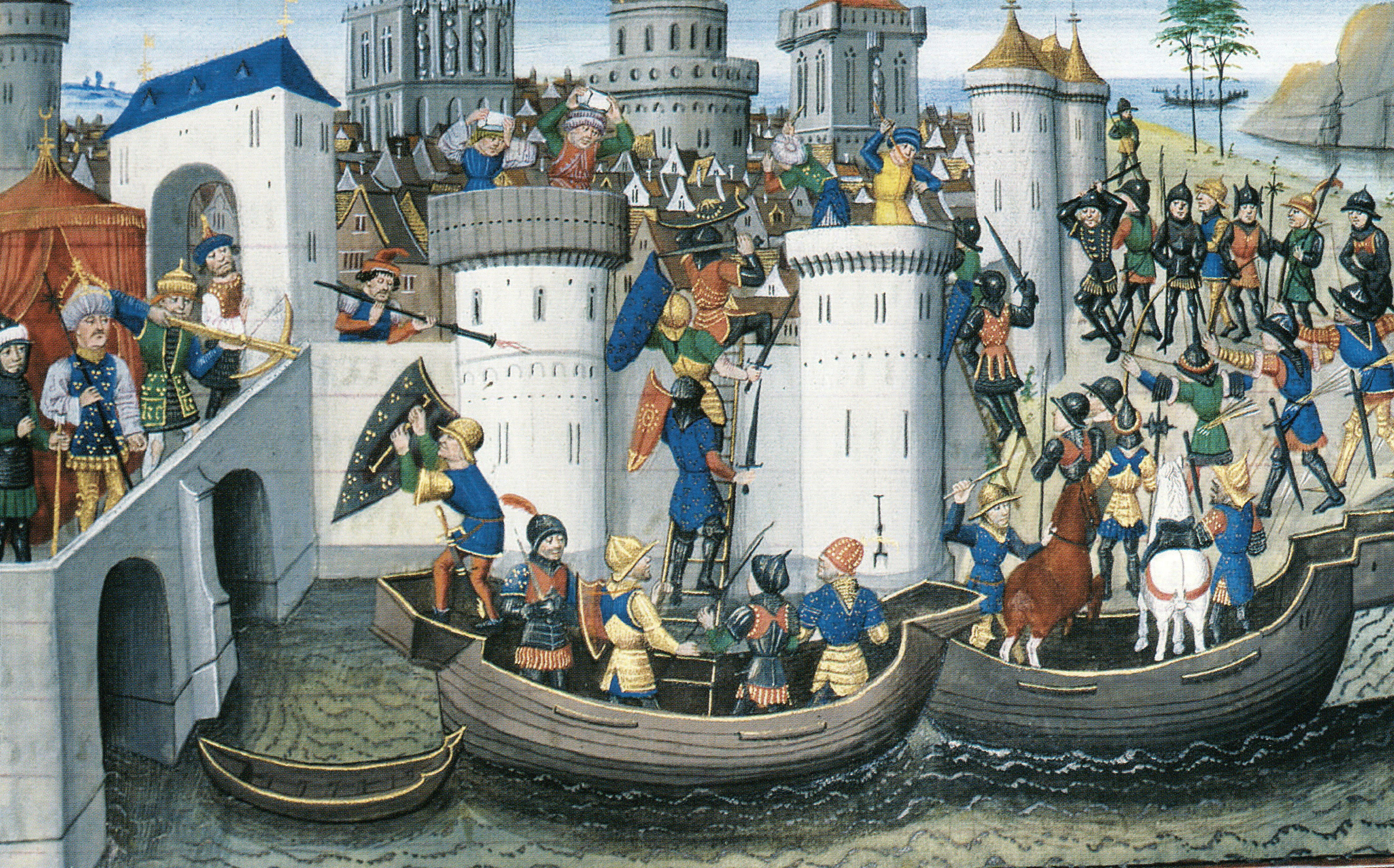
  Conquest of Constantinople by the Crusaders
- April 12 – Sack of Constantinople: Crusaders enter Constantinople by storm and start pillaging the city as part of the Fourth Crusade. Forces of the Republic of Venice seize the antique statues that will become the horses of Saint Mark.
- May 16 – Baldwin, Count of Flanders, is crowned emperor of the Latin Empire a week after his election by the members of the Fourth Crusade.
- Theodore I Laskaris flees to Nicaea after the capture of Constantinople, and establishes the Empire of Nicaea; Byzantine successor states are also established in Epirus and Trebizond.
- Boniface I, Marquis of Montferrat, a leader of the Fourth Crusade, founds the Kingdom of Thessalonica.
- The writings of French theologian Amalric of Bena are condemned by the University of Paris and Pope Innocent III.
- Tsar Kaloyan is recognized as king of Bulgaria by Pope Innocent III, after the creation of the Bulgarian Uniate church.
- Valdemar II of Denmark is recognized as king in Norway.
- Angers and Normandy are captured by Philip II of France.
- The Cistercian convent of Port-Royal-des-Champs is established.
- The district of Cham becomes subject to Bavaria.
- Hermann I, Landgrave of Thuringia submits to Philip of Swabia.
- Beaulieu Abbey is founded.
- The Channel Islands of Guernsey and Jersey decide, after a plebiscite of wealthy land owners, to remain with the English crown, after Normandy is recaptured by Philip II of France.
- Landshut, Bavaria, is Founded.

== Births ==
- April 14 – Henry I, king of Castile (d. 1217)
- Haakon IV of Norway (d. 1263)
- Henry Raspe, Landgrave of Thuringia (d. 1247)
- Maria of Courtenay, Empress regent of Nicaea (d. 1228)
- Alice of Schaerbeek (d. 1250)

== Deaths ==
- January 1 – King Haakon III of Norway
- January – Isaac II Angelos, Byzantine emperor
- February 8 – Alexios IV Angelos, Byzantine emperor
- April 1 – Eleanor of Aquitaine, Sovereign Duchess Regnant of Aquitaine, queen of France and England
- August 11 – King Guttorm of Norway
- August 14 – Minamoto no Yoriie, Japanese shōgun (b. 1182)
- September 30 or November 30 – Emeric, King of Hungary (b. 1174)
- c. October 21 – Robert de Beaumont, 4th Earl of Leicester, English nobleman
- November – Ban Kulin, ruler of Bosnia (b. 1163)
- December 12 (or December 13) – Maimonides, Spanish rabbi and philosopher (b. 1135)
- December 22 – Fujiwara no Shunzei, Japanese waka poet (b. 1114)
- date unknown – Suleiman II, Sultan of Rûm
- probable – Amalric of Bena, French theologian
