= Gottfried of Admont =

Gottfried of Admont (died 1165) was the Benedictine abbot of Admont Abbey from 1137 until his death. He is considered to be a reformer and the founder of the "school of Admont", and he is also credited with greatly improving the abbey's library.

He was an influential figure, undertaking with Otto of Freising and Berthold of Brixen a papal commission relative to the proposed bishopric of Seckau. He strongly backed St Eberhard, who became bishop of Salzburg in 1146.

Many homilies are attributed to him, taking the character of exegesis; it is now doubted whether he was the author of all of them. His brother Irimbert was a successor as abbot, and may have written some of them.
