= 1202 =

1202 in various calendars
- Gregorian calendar: 1202; MCCII
- Ab urbe condita: 1955
- Armenian calendar: 651; ԹՎ ՈԾԱ
- Assyrian calendar: 5952
- Balinese saka calendar: 1123–1124
- Bengali calendar: 608–609
- Berber calendar: 2152
- English Regnal year: 3 Joh. 1 – 4 Joh. 1
- Buddhist calendar: 1746
- Burmese calendar: 564
- Byzantine calendar: 6710–6711
- Chinese calendar: 辛酉年 (Metal Rooster); 3899 or 3692 — to — 壬戌年 (Water Dog); 3900 or 3693
- Coptic calendar: 918–919
- Discordian calendar: 2368
- Ethiopian calendar: 1194–1195
- Hebrew calendar: 4962–4963
- Hindu calendars
- Vikram Samvat: 1258–1259
- Shaka Samvat: 1123–1124
- Kali Yuga: 4302–4303
- Holocene calendar: 11202
- Igbo calendar: 202–203
- Iranian calendar: 580–581
- Islamic calendar: 598–599
- Japanese calendar: Kennin 2 (建仁２年)
- Javanese calendar: 1110–1111
- Julian calendar: 1202; MCCII
- Korean calendar: 3535
- Minguo calendar: 710 before ROC 民前710年
- Nanakshahi calendar: −266
- Thai solar calendar: 1744–1745
- Tibetan calendar: ལྕགས་མོ་བྱ་ལོ་ (female Iron-Bird); 1328 or 947 or 175 — to — ཆུ་ཕོ་ཁྱི་ལོ་ (male Water-Dog); 1329 or 948 or 176

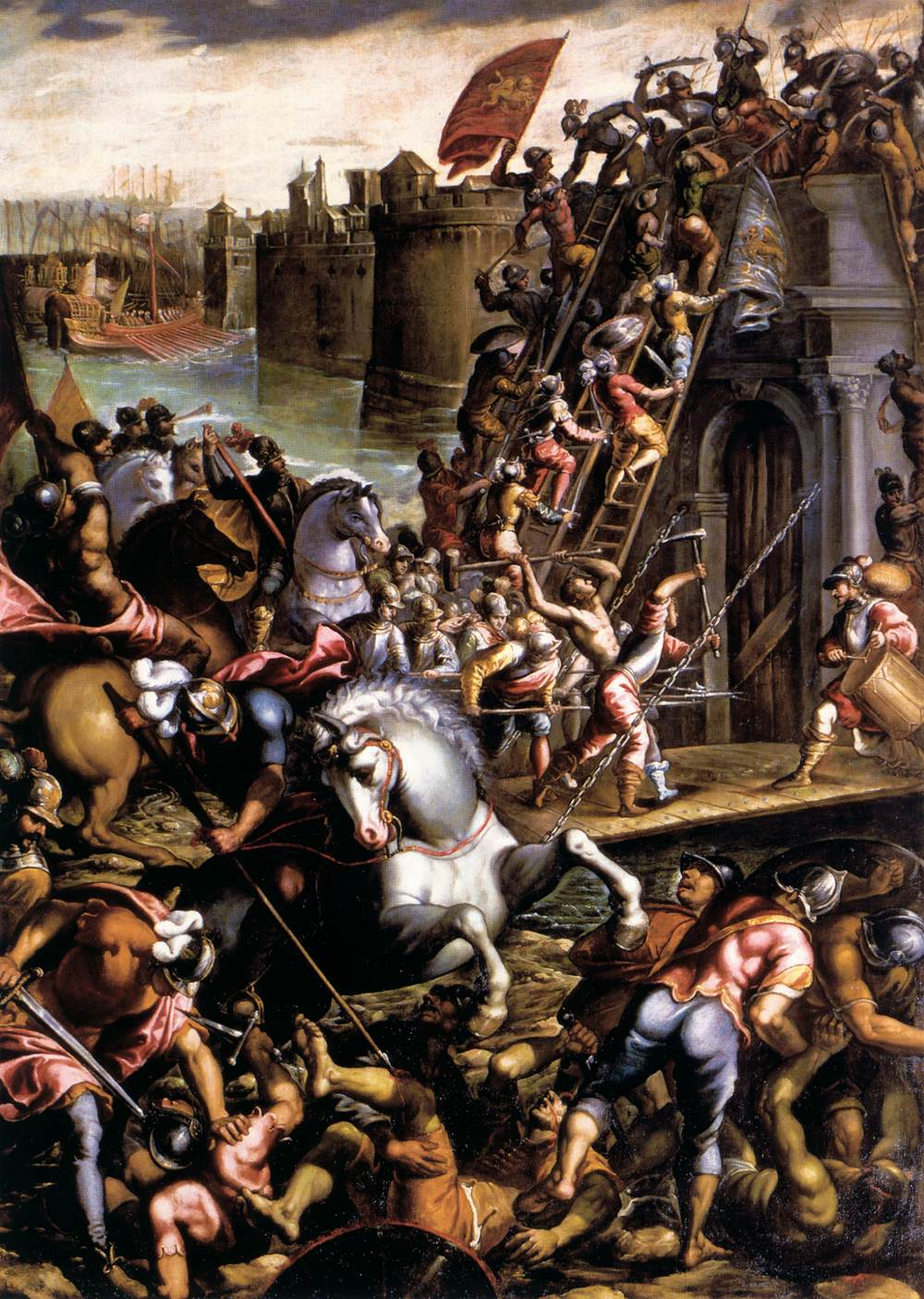
The Crusaders conquering the city of Zara (modern Zadar), by Andrea Vicentino.

Year 1202 (MCCII) was a common year starting on Tuesday of the Julian calendar.

== Events ==
=== By place ===
==== Fourth Crusade ====
- April–May – The bulk of the Crusader army gathers at Venice, although with far smaller numbers than expected: about 12,000 men (4–5,000 knights and 8,000 soldiers) instead of 33,500 men. Several contingents decide to make their own way to the Holy Land by different routes. A Crusader fleet, sailing from Flanders, carrying supplies for the Counts Baldwin IX and his brother Henry of Flanders, winters in Marseille, but is slowed by adverse weather. Later it sails on to the Middle East, along with other contingents from southern France.
- Summer – The Crusader army, encamped on the island of San Niccolo di Lido, between the Venetian Lagoon and the Adriatic Sea, is threatened by Doge Enrico Dandolo to keep them interned unless full payment is made as agreed in 1201. As the Crusaders wait on the Lido for men to arrive, they also use up food supplies that Venice has agreed to supply. Dandolo faces a financial catastrophe, having halted Venice's commerce for a year to prepare the expedition. The Crusader lords can offer Dandolo only 51,000 silver marks.
- September 8 – Enrico Dandolo takes the cross and agrees to lead a Venetian force, which, in an outburst of Crusading enthusiasm, reaches some 21,000 men – the largest contingent of the Fourth Crusade. He proclaims the debts will be wiped if the Crusaders take the 'rebel' Dalmatian city of Zara (modern-day Zadar) which has pledged its loyalty to Emeric, king of Hungary and Croatia. The Zara proposal causes disquiet in the Crusader ranks and also upsets Pope Innocent III who threatens to excommunicate those who attack Zara.
- September – Byzantine Prince Alexios Angelos sends representatives from Verona to the Crusader leaders in Venice. He promises to submit the Greek Orthodox Church to papal obedience and to provide the Crusade with 200,000 silver marks, together with provisions for a year. Alexios also will contribute 10,000 mounted soldiers to the expedition. In return he wants the Crusade to overthrow his uncle, the Byzantine emperor Alexios III Angelos.
- November 10–24 – Siege of Zara: The Crusaders under Boniface of Montferrat besiege and conquer Zara (modern-day Zadar) in Dalmatia. Despite letters from Innocent III forbidding such an action, and threatening excommunication. The leading citizens of Zara hang banners of crosses along the outer walls, professing their Catholic faith. Nevertheless, the Crusaders breach and sack the city, killing many.
- Winter – Innocent III excommunicates the Crusader army, along with the Venetians, who winter at Zara. Many Crusaders, including some senior men, either abandon the Fourth Crusade or make their own way to the Holy Land. However, the majority remain in Zara, where the army receives some welcome reinforcements. During the winter, negotiations continue with Alexios Angelos.

==== Europe ====
- Spring – King Philip II of France ("Augustus") summons John, King of England ("Lackland") to Paris to answer his charges against the Lusignans. On April 28, failing to attend Philip's court, John is declared to be a 'rebel' and to have forfeited the areas of Aquitaine, Poitou and Anjou. Philip tries to mediate the political problems between John and the Lusignans (who are charged with treason) but this is ignored by John. The lands are given to Arthur of Brittany. Philip supports Arthur's claim to the English throne and betrothes his 4-year-old daughter Marie.
- August 1 – Battle of Mirebeau: Arthur of Brittany, supported by the Lusignans, lays siege to Mirebeau Castle trapping Eleanor of Aquitaine inside. John launches a rescue mission to free his mother, and with a mercenary army defeats the Breton-Lusignan forces. Arthur is captured by William de Braose and is handed over to John who imprisons him in the Château de Falaise in Normandy. Many other important knights are captured and shipped to England (where John treats them badly and keeps them as prisoners in dungeons).
- July 27 – Battle of Basiani: Seljuk forces (some 150,000 men) under Suleiman II of Rum advance toward the Georgian border and are met by a 65,000-strong army led by King David Soslan, husband of Queen Tamar of Georgia, at Basian. The Georgians assail the enemy's camp and in a pitched battle, the Seljuk forces are overwhelmed and defeated. The loss of the sultan's banner (while Suleiman himself is wounded), results in panic within the Seljuk ranks. The victory at Basian secures the Georgian preeminence in the region.
- The Livonian Brothers of the Sword is founded by Bishop Albert of Riga, this to support the Livonian Crusade against the inhabitants of Terra Mariana (medieval Livonia).
- Danish forces make a Crusade to Finland which is led by Anders Sunesen, archbishop of Lund, and his brother.
- The Almohad fleet expels the Banu Ghaniya from the Balearic Islands.

==== Middle East ====
- May 20 – An earthquake shakes the Levant from Egypt to northern Iraq, causing severe damage in Palestine, Lebanon and western Syria, including the fortifications of the Crusader cities of Acre, Jaffa and Tyre.

=== By topic ===
==== Religion ====
- Spring – Pope Innocent III reasserts his right to evaluate and crown the Holy Roman Emperor, in a letter to Berthold V, Duke of Zähringen.
- Rueda Abbey is founded by Cistercians at Sástago, in the Kingdom of Aragon (modern Spain).

== Births ==
- February/March – Kunigunde of Hohenstaufen, queen of Bohemia (d. 1248)
- July – Boniface II ("the Giant"), king of Thessalonica (d. 1253)
- November 1 – Enni, Japanese Buddhist monk and teacher (d. 1280)
- Alfonso of Molina, prince of León and Castile (d. 1272)
- Margaret of Constantinople, countess of Flanders (d. 1280)
- Matilda II of Boulogne, queen consort of Portugal (d. 1259)
- Mōri Suemitsu, Japanese nobleman and samurai (d. 1247)
- Shi Tianze, Chinese general and prime minister (d. 1275)
- Approximate date – Qin Jiushao, Chinese mathematician and writer (d. 1261)

== Deaths ==
- January 9 – Birger Brosa, Swedish nobleman and knight
- January 12 – Fujiwara no Tashi, Japanese empress (b. 1140)
- March 9 – Sverre Sigurdsson (or Sverrir), king of Norway
- March 13 – Mieszko III the Old, duke of Poland (b. 1126)
- March 30 – Joachim of Fiore, Italian theologian (b. 1135)
- April 5 – Geoffrey III, Count of Perche (or Geoffrey IV), French nobleman and knight
- May 7 – Hamelin de Warenne, Norman nobleman (b. 1130)
- May 10 – Mu'adzam Shah of Kedah, Malaysian sultan
- June 16 – Aymer (or Adhemar), count of Angoulême
- July 7 – Roger de Beaumont, English chancellor and bishop in Scotland
- August 8 – Simon I, German nobleman and knight
- August 10 – Ulrich II, German nobleman and knight
- September 7 – William of the White Hands, French cardinal (b. 1135)
- November 12 – Canute VI, king of Denmark (b. 1163)
- December 3 – Conrad of Querfurt, German bishop
- Albert of Chiatina, Italian archpriest and saint (b. 1135)
- André de Chauvigny (or Andrew), French knight (b. 1150)
- Bernard of Fézensaguet, French nobleman (b. 1155)
- Blondel de Nesle (or Jean I), French trouvère (b. 1155)
- Eugenius of Palermo, Italian admiral and poet (b. 1130)
- Geoffroy de Donjon, French Grand Master and knight
- Hammad al-Harrani, Ayyubid scholar, poet and traveler
- Jakuren, Japanese Buddhist priest and poet (b. 1139)
- Kojijū, Japanese noblewoman and waka poet (b. 1121)
- Minamoto no Yoshishige, Japanese samurai (b. 1135)
- 1202/03 – Alain de Lille, French theologian and writer (b. c.1128)
