= 1175 =

1175 in various calendars
- Gregorian calendar: 1175; MCLXXV
- Ab urbe condita: 1928
- Armenian calendar: 624; ԹՎ ՈԻԴ
- Assyrian calendar: 5925
- Balinese saka calendar: 1096–1097
- Bengali calendar: 581–582
- Berber calendar: 2125
- English Regnal year: 21 Hen. 2 – 22 Hen. 2
- Buddhist calendar: 1719
- Burmese calendar: 537
- Byzantine calendar: 6683–6684
- Chinese calendar: 甲午年 (Wood Horse); 3872 or 3665 — to — 乙未年 (Wood Goat); 3873 or 3666
- Coptic calendar: 891–892
- Discordian calendar: 2341
- Ethiopian calendar: 1167–1168
- Hebrew calendar: 4935–4936
- Hindu calendars
- Vikram Samvat: 1231–1232
- Shaka Samvat: 1096–1097
- Kali Yuga: 4275–4276
- Holocene calendar: 11175
- Igbo calendar: 175–176
- Iranian calendar: 553–554
- Islamic calendar: 570–571
- Japanese calendar: Jōan 5 / Angen 1 (安元元年)
- Javanese calendar: 1082–1083
- Julian calendar: 1175; MCLXXV
- Korean calendar: 3508
- Minguo calendar: 737 before ROC 民前737年
- Nanakshahi calendar: −293
- Seleucid era: 1486/1487 AG
- Thai solar calendar: 1717–1718
- Tibetan calendar: ཤིང་ཕོ་རྟ་ལོ་ (male Wood-Horse); 1301 or 920 or 148 — to — ཤིང་མོ་ལུག་ལོ་ (female Wood-Sheep); 1302 or 921 or 149

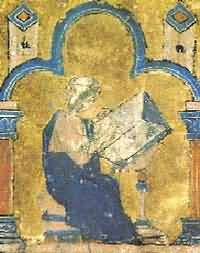
William of Tyre (c. 1130–1186)

Year 1175 (MCLXXV) was a common year starting on Wednesday of the Julian calendar.

== Events ==
=== By place ===
==== Britain ====
- King Henry II begins living openly with his mistress Rosamund Clifford, raising suspicions about their relationship and alienating Henry's wife, Queen Eleanor of Aquitaine.
- Eleanor of Aquitaine is held under house arrest at Old Sarum Castle in Wiltshire. She is kept in comfort there – fine clothes for her are dispatched regularly from London.
- Treaty of Windsor: High King Ruaidrí Ua Conchobair relinquishes his title and agrees to submit to Henry II as vassal of Connacht in Ireland.
- Winter – The Massacre of Abergavenny ends with several Welsh noblemen dead, at the orders of Lord William de Braose.

==== Europe ====
- Under the admirals of the clan Banu Mardanish, an Almohad fleet suffers a large defeat at the hand of the Portuguese, as they are trying to re-conquer Lisbon.
- Vordingborg Castle is completed by King Valdemar I of Denmark as a defensive fortress.
- The University of Modena and Reggio Emilia in Italy is founded.

==== Levant ====
- May 22 – A group of Isma'ili Assassins gains access into Saladin's camp and attempts to kill him during the siege of Aleppo. But his bodyguard saves his life, the others are slain while trying to escape.

==== Asia ====
- The Chinese court establishes several government-paper money factories in the cities of Chengdu, Hangzhou and Huizhou. In Hangzhou alone a daily workforce of more than 1,000 men is employed.
- The Namayan Kingdom formed by a confederation of barangays, reaches its peak on Luzon (modern Philippines).

=== By topic ===
==== Religion ====
- The High Academy of the Bosnian Church in Moštre (modern-day Visoko), is first mentioned in the Vatican archives.
- Count Raymond of Tripoli appoints William II as chancellor of Jerusalem and is elected as archbishop of Tyre.

== Births ==
- February 4 – Nadaungmya, king of Burma (d. 1235)
- Al-Zahir, caliph of the Abbasid Caliphate (d. 1226)
- Emo of Friesland, Frisian scholar and abbot (d. 1237)
- Frederick I, duke of Austria (d. 1198)
- Henry Audley, English nobleman (d. 1246)
- Herman II, German nobleman (House of Lippe) (d. 1229)
- Hōjō Tokifusa, Japanese nobleman and monk (d. 1240)
- Margaret of Hungary, Byzantine empress (d. 1223)
- Michael Scot, Scottish mathematician and scholar (d. 1232)
- Otto IV, Holy Roman Emperor (House of Welf) (d. 1218)
- Philip I, margrave of Namur (d. 1212)
- Raymond of Penyafort, Spanish Dominican friar (d. 1275)
- Robert Grosseteste, English statesman (d. 1253)
- Roger III, king of Sicily (House of Hauteville) (d. 1193)
- Śārṅgadeva, Indian musicologist and writer (d. 1247)
- Subutai, Mongol general and strategist (d. 1248)
- Theodore I, emperor of Nicaea (d. 1221)
- Yolanda, empress of the Latin Empire (d. 1219)

== Deaths ==
- January 12 – Yi Ui-bang, Korean military leader (b. 1121)
- January 24 – Ibn Asakir, Syrian historian and mystic (b. 1105)
- March 5 – Frederick of Hallum, Frisian priest and abbot
- May 15 – Mleh I, prince of Armenia
- May 25 – Ishoyahb V, patriarch of the Church of the East
- July 1 – Reginald de Dunstanville, English nobleman (b. 1110)
- July 27 – Ponce de Minerva, French nobleman and general
- October 19 – Andrew of Saint Victor, English abbot and scholar
- November 13 – Henry of France, archbishop of Reims (b. 1121)
- Ibn Saad al-Khair al-Balancy, Arab Andalusian linguist and poet (b. 1116)
- Clementia of Zähringen, duchess of Bavaria and Saxony
- Maria Torribia, Spanish laywoman and hermit
- Nicholas Hagiotheodorites, Byzantine scholar and official
