= Hugh of Poitiers =

Hugh of Poitiers (died 1167) was a Benedictine monk of Vézelay Abbey and chronicler.

His Historia Vizeliacensis monasterii was written from about 1140 to 1160. Besides being a rather partisan account of the affairs of the Abbey, it is an important source for the history of France in its period. It was written for Abbot Ponce of Vézelay (1138–1161), who was brother to Peter the Venerable of Cluny Abbey.

He also wrote the Origo et historia brevis Nivernensium comitum, about the county of Nevers.
