= Norwegian Law of Succession =

Adjusts the succession in the Norwegian monarchy

The Norwegian Law of Succession (Tronfølgeloven av 1163) was first introduced in 1163 during the Civil war era in Norway.

The Succession law was an accord between Erling Skakke and Øystein Erlendsson, Archbishop of Nidaros. Erling Skakke was married to Kristin Sigurdsdatter, the daughter of King Sigurd Jorsalfar. They had a son, Magnus Erlingsson, who was deemed to be a legitimate claimant to the throne, which was left vacant with the death of King Haakon II. Archbishop Erlendsson agreed to terms under which Magnus inherited the Norwegian throne, in exchange for greater power afforded to the Church. Magnus was crowned king in 1163 at the age of eight and the succession law was enacted simultaneously. As king, Magnus had to promise to obey the Pope, while Church law was recognized on an equal level with secular laws. Erling took the title of earl and held the real power, since Magnus was a minor.

According to the Succession law, there should be only one king, with primogeniture as a rule. If the oldest son was not fit to be king, a council of sixty representatives should select another of the legitimate royal sons. After this they could choose between another of the royal heirs. If the king had no suitable heir, the council could choose whoever they thought would better "guard God's right and the laws of the land". If the representatives could not agree, the bishops of the Church should decide the election.

The Law of Succession was then amended in 1302 which gave women the right to inherit the throne and stated that the throne was first to pass to Duchess Ingeborg's line, and after that, to Princess Agnes's line in ensure that the throne will return to Haakon V Magnusson's oldest daughter's line.

== See also ==
- Line of succession to the Norwegian Throne

== Primary Sources ==
- Holmsen, Andreas (1965) Erkebiskop Eystein og tronfølgeloven av 1163 (Oslo, Historisk tidsskrift)
- Steen, Sverre: (1949) Tronfølgeloven av 1163 og konungstekja i hundreåret etter (eng: "The 1163 Norwegian Law of Succession and the royals coronations in the following century"
