= Bashnouna =

Egyptian saint and martyr

Saint Bashnouna
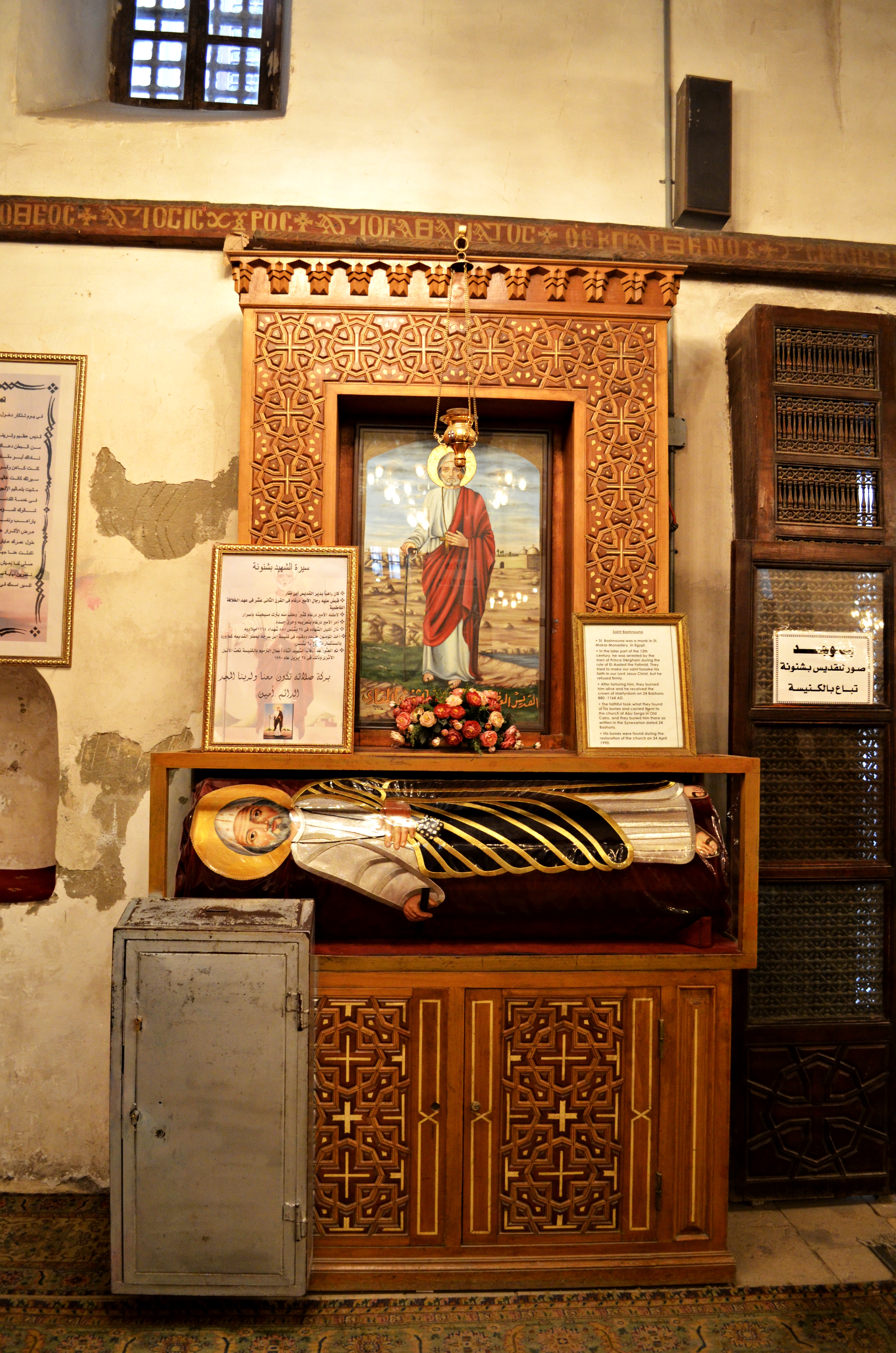
- Bashnouna's relics in the Church of Saints Sergius and Bacchus

Martyr
- Born: 12th century Egypt
- Died: 19 May 1164; Egypt
- Venerated in: Coptic Orthodox Church
- Feast: 19 May (24 Pashons)

Bashnouna (Coptic: ⲡⲓϣⲉⲛⲛⲟⲩϥⲓ, romanized: Pišennoufi) (died 19 May 1164) was a Coptic saint and martyr.

According to his hagiography, Bashnouna was a monk in the Monastery of Saint Macarius the Great in Scetes. He was arrested by the Fatimid authorities during the caliphate of Al-'Āḍid, and threatened to face death if he were not to convert to Islam. Having refused, Bashnouna was burned alive on 24 Pashons, 880 A.M. (19 May 1164 AD) His relics were buried at the Church of Saint Sergius in Cairo.

He is commemorated on 24 Pachans.

== Sources ==
- Coptic Synexarion
