= Ibn Tumlus =

Valencian scholar (1164–1223)

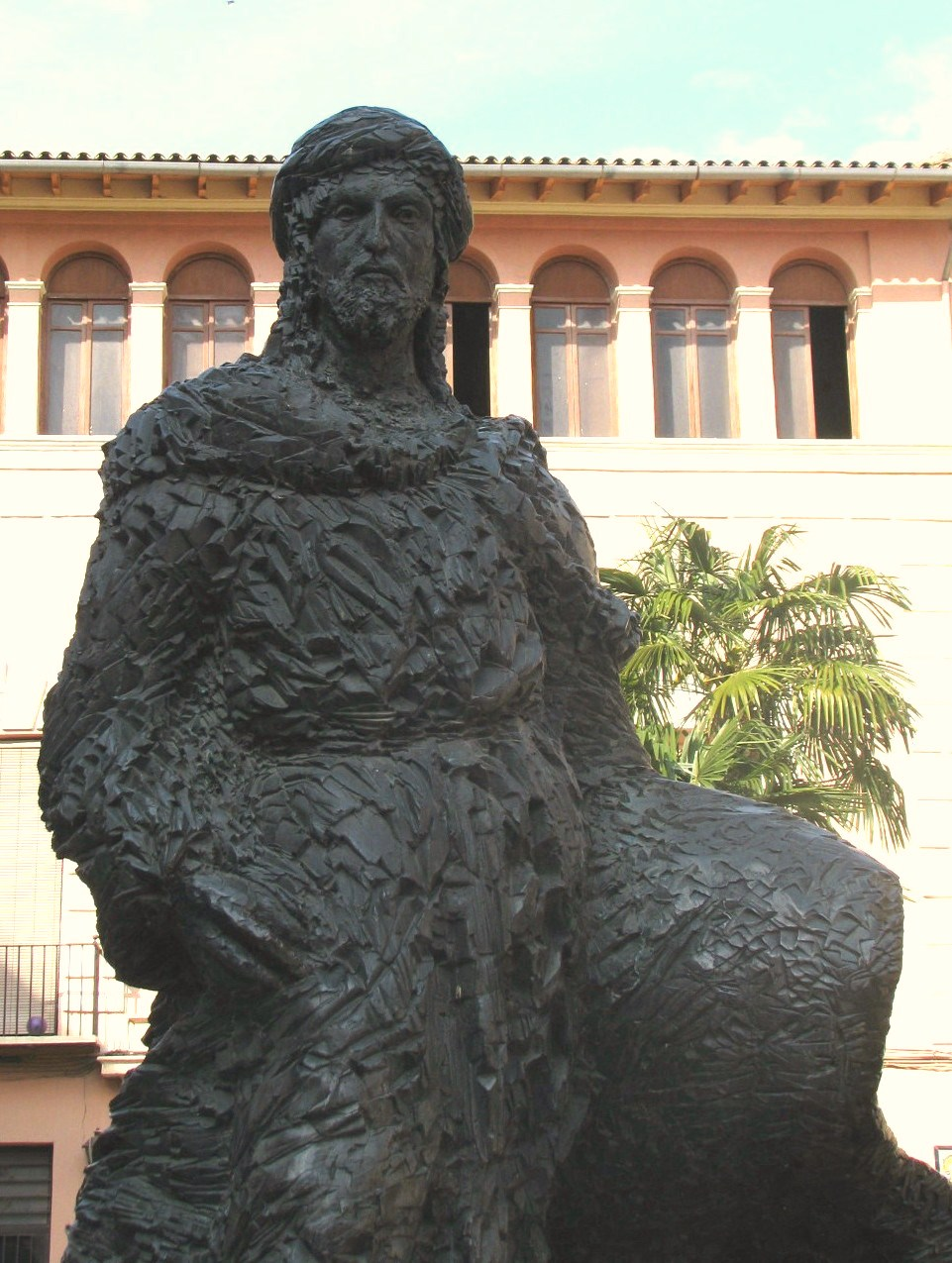
Sculpture of Ibn Ṭumlūs in Alzira

Ibn Ṭumlūs (Arabic: ابن طملوس) (1164–1223) was a Valencian scholar whose interests ranged over medicine, philosophy, grammar and poetry. He is mainly known today for his work in logic. Ibn Ṭumlūs is known by his biographers under the name of Abū al-Ḥajjāj or Abū Isḥāq Yūsuf ibn Muhammed ibn Ṭumlūs. In Latin sources, he is known as Alhagiag Bin Thalmus.

== Biography ==
He was born in Alzira, near Valencia, sometime between 1150 and 1165. He studied philosophy, medicine and perhaps jurisprudence with Averroes (Ibn Rushd), and his achievements in medicine were such that he succeeded Averroes as doctor of the Almohad caliph, Mohammad al-Nāṣir, from 1199 to 1213. He died at Alzira in 1223.

== Notable Work ==
Not one of the works of Ibn Ṭumlūs known of today is mentioned by his biographers. Conversely, not one of the works mentioned by his biographers is available today. Ibn Abbar stated that Ibn Ṭumlūs authored some works on the sciences of the Arabic language, but these do not seem to be extant. In addition, Ibn Ṭumlūs's biographers transmitted to us some poems made by him, which have been transcribed in Fouad Ben Ahmed's definitive biobibliography. There are only two major works that are known to have survived, his Book on Logic and his commentary on Avicenna's Medical Poem.

=== Book on Logic ===
Ṭumlūs’ Book on Logic (Kitāb fī Mantiq) survives in just a single manuscript. The manuscript is undated and untitled. Some scholars have proposed dates, but these remain speculative. Although parts of the treatise have been edited under the title Introduction to the Art of Logic, in fact neither Ibn Ṭumlūs nor his copyist gave a title to the work. The text covers all the parts of Aristotle's Organon, including a Book of Rhetoric and Book of Poetics. Indeed, his advocacy of this expanded Organon is one of the significant features of the work. The treatise begins with a long introduction (Ṣadr) to the text in which Ibn Ṭumlūs addresses several controversies concerning his education in logic and the attitudes of the scholars of his time towards logic (namely, the jurists and the students of the prophetic tradition). He considers also the value of al-Ghazālī’s and al-Fārābī’s logical works, both from a philosophical and a religious point of view. Yet although both of these figures are influential on Ibn Ṭumlūs, recent scholarship has shown that his principal influence is his teacher, Averroes.

Excerpts from the Book on Logic have been edited and translated by various scholars:

- part of the introduction into French
- the introduction and first three sections into Spanish
- excerpts from the section on poetics into French
- the section on rhetoric into French

A critical Arabic edition of the sections on dialectic and sophistical topics has recently been made by Fouad Ben Ahmed, who is at work on an Arabic edition of the remainder of the work. At present, no English translations are available.

=== Commentary on Avicenna's Medical Poem ===
Ibn Ṭumlūs' other major surviving work is his commentary on Avicenna's Medical Poem (Šarḥ al-Urǧūza). Although there are eight known manuscripts containing this work, with more probably yet to be identified, no complete edition of the work has been made. A colophon at the end of one manuscript dates Ibn Ṭumlūs' final revisions of the work to Marrakesh in 1209. Scholarship on this work is, at this point, extremely limited.
