= 1229 =

1229 in various calendars
- Gregorian calendar: 1229; MCCXXIX
- Ab urbe condita: 1982
- Armenian calendar: 678; ԹՎ ՈՀԸ
- Assyrian calendar: 5979
- Balinese saka calendar: 1150–1151
- Bengali calendar: 635–636
- Berber calendar: 2179
- English Regnal year: 13 Hen. 3 – 14 Hen. 3
- Buddhist calendar: 1773
- Burmese calendar: 591
- Byzantine calendar: 6737–6738
- Chinese calendar: 戊子年 (Earth Rat); 3926 or 3719 — to — 己丑年 (Earth Ox); 3927 or 3720
- Coptic calendar: 945–946
- Discordian calendar: 2395
- Ethiopian calendar: 1221–1222
- Hebrew calendar: 4989–4990
- Hindu calendars
- Vikram Samvat: 1285–1286
- Shaka Samvat: 1150–1151
- Kali Yuga: 4329–4330
- Holocene calendar: 11229
- Igbo calendar: 229–230
- Iranian calendar: 607–608
- Islamic calendar: 626–627
- Japanese calendar: Antei 3 / Kangi 1 (寛喜元年)
- Javanese calendar: 1137–1139
- Julian calendar: 1229; MCCXXIX
- Korean calendar: 3562
- Minguo calendar: 683 before ROC 民前683年
- Nanakshahi calendar: −239
- Thai solar calendar: 1771–1772
- Tibetan calendar: ས་ཕོ་བྱི་བ་ལོ་ (male Earth-Rat); 1355 or 974 or 202 — to — ས་མོ་གླང་ལོ་ (female Earth-Ox); 1356 or 975 or 203

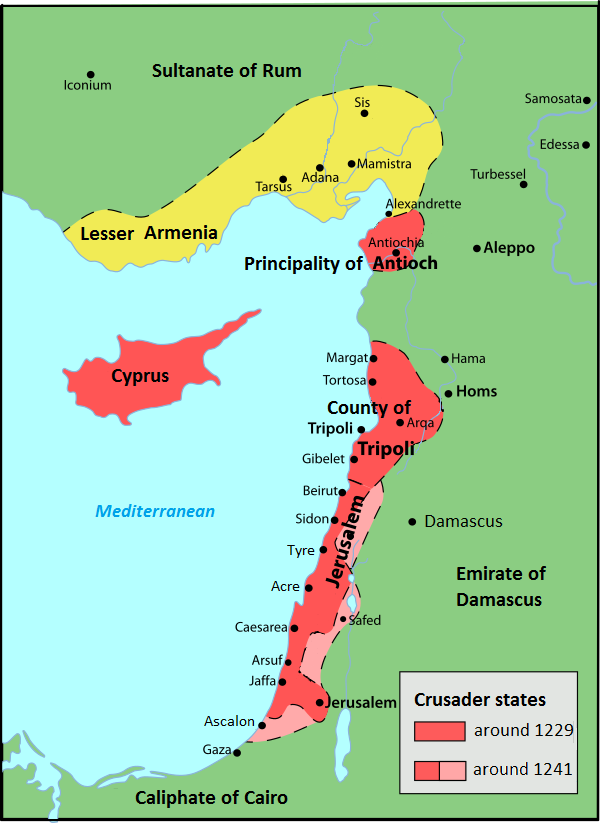
The Crusader states (around 1229)

Year 1229 (MCCXXIX) was a common year starting on Monday of the Julian calendar.

== Events ==
=== By place ===
==== Sixth Crusade ====
- February 18 – Treaty of Jaffa: Emperor Frederick II signs a 10-year truce together with Sultan Al-Kamil and his representatives; he manages to regain many parts of the Holy Land through political negotiation, rather than by resorting to military force or directly confronting the Muslim army. Frederick's achievements, including the control of Jerusalem (without the Temple Mount) and Bethlehem, with a corridor running through Lydda to the sea of Jaffa, as well as Nazareth and western Galilee, including Montfort Castle and Toron, and the remaining Muslim districts around Sidon. All Muslims are to be allowed the right of entry in Jerusalem and freedom of worship.
- March 17 – Frederick II enters Jerusalem, escorted by German and Italian troops. Of the Military Orders only the Teutonic Knights are represented and some clergy. He receives the formal surrender of the city by Al-Kamil's governor (or Qadi), who hands him the keys of Jerusalem. The procession then passes through streets to the old building of the Hospital (or the Muristan), where Frederick takes up his residence in the Christian Quarter.
- March 18 – Frederick II crowns himself as King of Jerusalem in an impromptu ceremony in the Church of the Holy Sepulchre. After the ceremony, he proceeds to the palace of the Hospitallers – where he holds a council to discuss the defense of Jerusalem. Frederick orders the Tower of David and the Gate of St. Stephen are to be repaired at once and he hands over the royal residence attached to the Tower of David to the Teutonic Order.
- May 1 – Frederick II departs from Acre, while he and his suite pass down the "Street of the Butchers" to the harbour, the people crowd out of the doors, and pelts him with entrails and dung. Meanwhile, Odo of Montbéliard (or Eudes), commander of the Crusader army, and John of Ibelin, lord of Beirut, are left behind to quell the unrest in Palestine.
- May – Frederick II arrives at Cyprus, where he attends the wedding proxy of the 12-year-old King Henry I (the Fat) to Alice of Montferrat – whose father is one of his staunch supporters in Italy. On June 10, Frederick lands at Brindisi, where the papal army under his father-in-law John of Brienne has invaded the Italian territories in Campania (→ War of the Keys).
- Autumn – Frederick II recovers the lost Italian territories and tries to condemn the leading rebel barons, but avoids crossing the frontiers of the Papal States. Meanwhile, a first serious raid on Jerusalem is made by a mass of unorganized Beduins and plunderers of pilgrims. An advance guard encouraged the Christians to expel the Muslims.

==== Europe ====
- January 23 – The episcopal seat is moved from Nousiainen to Koroinen (located near the current centre of Turku) by the permission of Pope Gregory IX. The date is starting to be considered as the founding of Turku.
- March 6 – University of Paris strike: Students begin to riot, after a dispute over a bill with a tavern proprietor. Queen Blanche of Castile demands retribution, and allows the city guard to punish the student rioters. She puts an economic strain upon the student quarter of Paris (the Latin Quarter), where Latin is commonly heard in the streets.
- April 12 – Treaty of Paris: Count Raymond VII is forced to sign a peace treaty (also known as the "Treaty of Meaux"). This brings the Albigensian Crusade to an end. Raymond regains his feudal rights but has to swear his allegiance to King Louis IX (the Saint). The fortifications, such as these of Avignon and Toulouse, are dismantled.
- September 5 – A Catalan-Aragonese expeditionary army under King James I (the Conqueror) embarks with 155 ships, 1,500 knights and 15,000 men from Tarragona, Salou, and Cambrils, in southern Catalonia. He sets sail to conquer Majorca. On December 31, James finally conquers the island from the Almohad ruler, Abu Yahya.
- November 28 – Battle of Olustra: Eric XI (the Lisp and Lame) is defeated and deposed as king of Sweden by Canute II (the Tall), who proclaims himself the new ruler.

==== England ====
- October 13 – King Henry III calls for an army to be assembled at Portsmouth to be transported to Normandy to regain lost territories from the French. A large army of knights turns up ready to go but not enough ships have been provided. Henry blames Hubert de Burgh, Earl of Kent for the fiasco and in his rage will have killed him if Ranulf of Chester has not intervened. This marks the beginning of the rift between Henry and Hubert de Burgh. Meanwhile, the expedition is postponed until mid-1230.

==== Levant ====
- June – Emir Al-Ashraf Musa captures Damascus and acknowledges the supremacy of his elder brother Al-Kamil. His other brother, An-Nasir Dawud, is compensated with the lordship of Al-Karak in the Transjordan region.

==== Africa ====
- Abu Zakariya Yahya expands his influence by conquering the cities of Constantine and Béjaïa (modern Algeria). He becomes the founder and first ruler of the Hafsid dynasty in Ifriqiya.

==== Asia ====
- September 13 – Ögedei Khan, the third son of Genghis Khan is proclaimed "Great Khan" of the Mongol Empire, at a Kurultai council.

=== By topic ===
==== Religion ====
- Council of Toulouse: The Catholic Church permanently establishes the Inquisition, in the charge of the Dominican Order in Rome.
- The University of Toulouse is founded in France. Raymond VII is forced to finance the teaching of theology.

== Births ==
- April 13 – Louis II (the Strict), German nobleman (d. 1294)
- Al-Ashraf Musa, Ayyubid prince (emir) and ruler (d. 1263)
- Beatrice of Provence, queen consort of Sicily (d. 1267)
- Kujō Tadaie, Japanese nobleman and regent (d. 1275)
- Oberto D'Oria, Italian nobleman and admiral (d. 1306)

== Deaths ==
- January 17 – Albert of Buxhoeven, bishop of Riga (b. 1165)
- February 8 – Ali ibn Hanzala, Arab imam and theologian
- February 14 – Rǫgnvaldr Guðrøðarson, ruler of the Isles
- March 13 – Blanche of Navarre, countess and regent of Champagne
- June 24 – Walter III (or de Brisebarre), lord of Caesarea
- August 21 – Iwo Odrowąż, Polish bishop and statesman
- September – Guillem II de Montcada, Spanish nobleman and knight
- October 10 – Henry de Beaumont, English nobleman
- October 22 – Gerard III, Dutch nobleman and knight
- October 26 – Fulk of Pavia, Italian prelate and bishop
- November 14 – Martin of Pattishall, English chief justice
- December 25 – Herman II, Lord of Lippe, German nobleman and knight (b. 1175)
- unknown date – Yaqut al-Hamawi, Arab geographer and writer (b. 1179)
