= Ibn al-Qabisi =

Iraqi linguist and poet

- Born: Muhammad ibn Abi al-Wafa ibn Ahmad al-Adawi al-Mawsili; 1163; Qabisa, Mosul
- Died: 1235 (aged 71–72); Aleppo
- Occupation(s): linguist, poet, teacher and writer
- Notable work: al-Ḥādī fī al-ʾIʿrab Ila Turuq al-Sawab

Abu Abdullah Muhammad ibn Abi al-Wafa ibn Ahmad al-Adawi al-Mawsili, known briefly as Ibn al-Qabaisi (1163–1235), was an Iraqi linguist and poet.

== Biography ==
al-Qabisi was born in Qabaisa a village in Mosul in a family from Isfahan. He studied Arabic grammar under Makki ibn Zabban, and hadith and Qur'an from Nasrallah al-Wasiti. He was taught for a while in Erbil. He was known for his skills in Arabic linguistics. He died in Aleppo and buried there. Wrote three preludes on Arabic grammar, Morphology and arithmetic, also Al-Tatimat fi al-Tasrif and Al-Hadi fi al-I'irab 'Ila Turuq al-Sawab.
