= 1220s =

Decade

The 1220s was a decade of the Julian Calendar which began on January 1, 1220, and ended on December 31, 1229.

== Events ==
=== By place ===
==== Fifth Crusade ====
- July – The Crusaders, led by the Knights Hospitaller, raid Burlus, located in the Nile Delta in Egypt. The town is pillaged, but the knights are ambushed on their return, and several Hospitallers, including Grand Master Guérin de Montaigu, are captured. Meanwhile, Sultan Al-Kamil sends an Egyptian squadron down the Rosetta branch of the Nile. It sails to Cyprus, where it finds a Crusader fleet lying off Limassol. During the attack, they sink and capture all the ships, taking many thousands of prisoners.
- Summer – The Crusader army is trapped by a Nile flood at Damietta. Cardinal Pelagius sends a Venetian squadron to intercept the Egyptian fleet, and attacks the harbours of Rosetta and Alexandria, but to no effect. Lack of money prevents Pelagius from building a sufficient number of ships, and the papal treasury can not spare him anymore. In September more of the Crusaders return home.

==== Mongol Empire ====
- Spring – The Mongol army (some 100,000 men) led by Genghis Khan crosses the Kyzylkum Desert – a freezing sand-and-tussock wilderness of some 450 kilometers – towards Bukhara. Meanwhile, Muhammad II, ruler of the Khwarazmian Empire, prepares a strong defense around his capital Samarkand. In February, Genghis approaches Bukhara, which is defended by a garrison of some 20,000 men, and begins the Siege of Bukhara. The city leaders open the gates to the Mongols, but Turkish forces who defend the city's citadel hold out for another twelve days. In a speech at the city's Friday Mosque, Genghis declares "I am the punishment of God."
- March – Mongol forces led by Genghis Khan besiege Samarkand, the city is defended by some 40,000 men, including a brigade of 20 war elephants. On the third day, the garrison launches a counter-attack, the defenders sent out their elephants, which panic, turn and trample their own men before escaping onto the open plain. Muhammad II attempts to relieve Samarkand twice but is driven back. After a week, the remainder of the garrison surrenders. The city's inhabitants, numbering some 100,000 are enslaved or slaughtered.
- Summer – Muhammad II flees westwards across northern Iran, hoping to find safety in the rugged and isolated region of Mazandaran on the southern coast of the Caspian Sea. He is pursued by 20,000 Mongol forces led by Subutai and Jebe (the Arrow). Abandoned by the remnants of his panic-stricken troops, Muhammad seeks shelter on a small island near Astara. There he dies of pleurisy some weeks later. He is succeeded by his son Jalal al-Din Mangburni, who is forced to flee to India after the Mongol invasion (see 1219).
- Autumn – Genghis Khan moves against the wealthy city of Urgench. He is joined by his eldest son Jochi, now conqueror of half a dozen lesser towns who attacks it from the north. Despite a stout defense, the city is taken after a 5-months siege. The Mongols have to fight for Urgench street by street, razing many houses. Jochi is given the right to loot the city for himself, but prefers to negotiate with the locals to avoid property damage. This is refused by Genghis, who removes Jochi from command and appoints Ögedei instead.
- November – Genghis Khan dispatches his youngest son Tolui, at the head of an army (around 50,000 men), into the Khwarazmian province of Khorasan. His forces also include 300 catapults, 700 mangonels to discharge pots filled with naphtha, 4,000 storming-ladders, and 2,500 sacks of earth for filling up moats. Among the first cities to fall is Termez (captured after a two-day siege) and later Balkh.

==== United Kingdom ====
- Spring – King Henry III makes large alterations to the Tower of London including new curtain walls, an improved water-filled ditch, and a water gate, so that he can enter the castle directly from the Thames.
- May 17 – The 12-year-old Henry III is crowned at Westminster Abbey. He is reminded of his duties as king to maintain peace, defend the rights of the English crown, and the barons swear an oath of fealty.
- Llywelyn the Great, Welsh prince of Gwynedd, begins raiding Pembrokeshire to retake land that he accuses William Marshal (the Younger) of stealing. This also includes Wiston Castle.

==== Europe ====
- April 26 – King Frederick II confirms rights of independence to the German bishops (the Confoederatio cum principibus ecclesiasticis) in an attempt to secure the election of his 9-year-old son, Henry VII as King of Germany.
- August 8 – Battle of Lihula: Estonian forces encircle the Lihula stronghold, occupied by an invading Swedish Crusader army. The Swedish troops along with Karl the Deaf try to make their way out, but they are killed.
- November 22 – Frederick II is crowned Holy Roman Emperor at Rome by Pope Honorius III. He makes Sicily an absolute monarchy and adopts Palermo as its principal seat.
- Dordrecht is granted city rights by William I, Count of Holland, making it the oldest city in present-day Netherlands.
- Polish forces under Konrad I drive out the heathen Prussians, from the Masovian territory of Chełmno Land.

==== Levant ====
- Summer – Raymond-Roupen, prince of Antioch, invades Armenian Cilicia, together with his mother, Alice, and establishes himself at Tarsus. There he waits for help from the Knights Hospitaller. Constantine of Baberon, a powerful Armenian nobleman and regent for Queen Isabella, marches with his forces to the Tarsus stronghold.

=== By topic ===
==== Religion ====
- Gothic architecture becomes increasingly popular in Europe:
  - The rebuilding of Cathedral of Chartres, which had been destroyed by a fire in 1194, is completed.
  - Early part of Toulouse Cathedral is completed.
  - The rebuilding of Amiens Cathedral begins.
  - The rebuilding of Oxford Cathedral begins.
  - The building of Salisbury Cathedral begins.
  - The rebuilding of York Minster begins.

==== Education ====
- In France the medical school of the University of Montpellier is granted its first statutes by the German cardinal-bishop Conrad of Urach.

=== By place ===
==== Byzantine Empire ====
- November – Emperor Theodore I Laskaris dies after a 16-year reign and is succeeded by his son-in-law John III Doukas Vatatzes. John fends off Theodore's brothers, who believe that they have the better claim for the throne of the Empire of Nicaea. In December, he becomes the sole ruler, and during his reign, the Empire becomes the most powerful of the Byzantine successor states and the frontrunner in the race to recover Constantinople from the Latin Empire. John also cultivates a close relationship with Frederick II, Holy Roman Emperor, and negotiates with Pope Honorius III about the possibility of reuniting the Church.

==== Fifth Crusade ====
- June – Sultan Al-Kamil again offers peace terms to Cardinal Pelagius with the cession of Jerusalem and all Palestine apart from Oultrejordain, together with a 30 years' truce and money compensation for the dismantling of Jerusalem. Meanwhile, a German contingent under Louis I of Bavaria arrives at Damietta, with orders from Frederick II not to launch an attack on Cairo until the emperor's arrival. Louis and Pelagius decide to advance into Egypt towards Mansoura, where Al-Kamil has built a fortress to protect Cairo. The Crusaders assemble their armies and tents are set up just up the Nile, on June 29.
- July 4 – Pelagius orders a three-days fast in preparation for the advance. King John I of Jerusalem arrives at Damietta to rejoin the Crusade at the command of Honorius III. The Crusader force moves towards Sheremsah, halfway between Faraskur and Mansoura on the east bank of the Nile, occupying the city on July 12. Sources tell of 630 ships of various sizes, 5,000 knights, 4,000 archers, and 40,000 men. A horde of pilgrims march with the army. They are ordered to keep close to the river, to supply the Crusaders with water. Pelagius plans a new offensive and leaves a large garrison at Damietta.
- July 24 – Pelagius moves the Crusader forces near Ashmun al-Rumman, on the opposite bank from Mansoura. Queen-Regent Alice of Cyprus and leaders of the military orders warn Pelagius of a large Muslim army being formed in Syria. Meanwhile, the Egyptian army under Al-Kamil crosses the Nile near Lake Manzaleh and establishes themselves between the Crusader camp and Damietta. In the Ushmum canal at Sheremsah, Al-Kamil's ships sail down the Nile and block the Crusaders' line of communications to Damietta. In August, Pelagius orders a retreat, but the route is cut off by Egyptians.
- August 26–28 – Battle of Mansoura: The Crusader army led by Pelagius and John I of Jerusalem is defeated by the Egyptian forces at Mansoura. John and the military orders fight a last stand on the river banks of the Nile. He beats off a Nubian assault (supported by elite Turkish cavalry) and drives them back, but only after thousands of soldiers have perished. The remaining Crusaders are surrounded by Al-Kamil's forces and begin a desperate retreat to Damietta. The city is well-garrisoned and supplied with arms; a naval squadron under Henry, Count of Malta ("Enrico Pescatore") defends the harbour against the Egyptians. The Crusaders retreat under cover of darkness. Many of the soldiers cannot bear to abandon their stores of wine, and drink them all rather than leave them. The Teutonic Knights set fire to the stores that they cannot carry, thus informing the Egyptians that they are abandoning their positions. In the meantime, Al-Kamil orders opening of the sluices along the right bank of the Nile, flooding the area. Pelagius on his ship is carried by the floodwaters past the blockading Egyptian fleet. Other ships, carrying the medical supplies of the army and much of its food, escape, but many are captured.
- August 28 – Pelagius sues for peace and sends an envoy to Al-Kamil. The terms of surrender are accepted, which includes the retreat from Damietta – leaving Egypt with the remnants of the Crusader army and an 8-year truce. After prisoners are exchanged, Al-Kamil enters Damietta on September 8. The Fifth Crusade ends with nothing gained for the West, with much lost, men, resources and reputations. The Crusaders blame Frederick II for not being there. Pelagius is accused of ineffectual leadership and a misguided view, which has led to rejecting the sultan's peace offerings.

==== Mongol Empire ====
- Spring – Genghis Khan orders an armed reconnaissance expedition into the Caucasus (consisting of Georgia and Armenia) under the command of Subutai and Jebe ("the Arrow"). The Mongols defeat two Georgian armies around Tbilisi, but lack the will or equipment to besiege the capital city. During the fighting, King George IV of Georgia himself is severely wounded and his elite knights are massacred. Meanwhile in Bamyan, the ruler Genghis Khan leads a Mongol force that besieges and captures the fortified city after fierce resistance; during the fighting, his grandson Mutukan is killed, prompting a brutal massacre of the city’s defenders. The Mongols then return to Azerbaijan and Persia, and burn and pillage a few more cities.
- February – The cities of Merv (perhaps the world's largest up to this date), Herat and Nishapur which have peacefully surrendered rise up in arms. Genghis Khan sends his son Tolui to spend an extra month to subdue the revolts. Contemporary scholars report over a million people are systematically killed in a genocide.
- September – Battle of Parwan: Sultan Jalal al-Din Mangburni recruits an army of Turkic and Afghan warriors numbering some 60,000 men. As soon as news of this reaches Genghis Khan he sends a Mongol army of 30,000 men, led by his stepbrother Shigi Qutuqu. Meanwhile, Jalal al-Din moves to Parwan (modern Afghanistan), where the two armies meet in a narrow valley. Jalal al-Din takes the initiative, ordering his right-wing of Turks to dismount and engage in a skirmish. On the third day, the Mongols are finally defeated by the Khwarezmian forces and are forced to retreat. Shigi Qutuzu is driven off in defeat, losing over half his army.
- October – The Mongol army raids Georgia for the second time, and Subutai and Jebe allow their forces to pass through the Caucasus Mountains.
- November 24 – Battle of the Indus: Left with some 20,000 men, Jalal al-Din Mangburni has headed for the Indus River where Genghis catches up with him. In a desperate battle the Khwarezmain forces are destroyed, completing the Mongol conquest of the Khwarazmian Empire, while Jalal al-Din flees across the river and escapes into India.

==== Europe ====
- June 16 – The Jewish population of Erfurt (Duchy of Thuringia) is massacred after a ritual murder libel. A crowd storms the synagogue where the Jews have gathered with the threat of baptism or death. The Jewish quarter, including the synagogue, is razed: many Jews are tortured and killed.
- Siege of Tallinn: An Estonian Crusader army tries to conquer the Danish stronghold of Tallinn with the help of Revalians, Harrians and Vironians. They besiege the stronghold for 14 days but finally retreat their forces.

==== Britain ====
- June 21 – 10-year-old Joan of England, eldest daughter of the late King John, marries the 21-year-old King Alexander II of Scotland at York Minster.

==== Asia ====
- May 13 – Emperor Juntoku is forced to abdicate, and is briefly succeeded by his 2-year-old son Chūkyō on the throne of Japan. Ex-Emperor Go-Toba leads the unsuccessful Jōkyū War against the Kamakura shogunate.
- July 29 – The 9-year-old Go-Horikawa ascends to the Chrysanthemum Throne at the Kyoto Imperial Palace in Japan. He is a grandson of the late Emperor Takakura and a nephew of the exiled Go-Toba.

==== Mesoamerica ====
- The Maya of the Yucatán revolt against the rulers of Chichen Itza.

=== By place ===
==== Asia ====
- The Ghurid dynasty capital of Firozkoh (in modern-day Afghanistan) is destroyed, by Mongol Emperor Ögedei Khan.
- After the invasion and destruction of the Khwarezmian Empire in 1221, Genghis Khan returns to Mongolia, and a rebellion sparks in Helmand, to which the response is a large army led by Ögedei Khan sent into the region to put an end to the rebellion of Muhammad the Marghani, resulting in the killing of every man in Ghazni and Helmand, and the enslavement and selling of most of the women of the region.
- Genghis Khan’s armies were said to have killed approximately 1.6 million people in the city of Herat, in Northwestern Afghanistan.

==== Mesoamerica ====
- Chiconquiauhtzin becomes Ruler of the City-state Azcapotzalco at the Valley of Mexico

==== Europe ====
- April 17 – Stephen Langton, Archbishop of Canterbury in England, opens a council at Osney Abbey, Oxford.
- May 9 – Synod of Oxford – The 1222 Christian Synod of Oxford passes antisemitic laws that forbid social interactions between Jews and Christians, places a specific tithe on Jews and requires them to wear an identifying badge.
- May 11 – 1222 Cyprus earthquake.
- August – After the death of John I of Sweden on March 10, 6-year-old Erik Eriksson is elected new King of Sweden (sometime between this time and July 1223).
- December 15 – The Golden Bull of 1222 is issued in Hungary, limiting the power of the monarchy over the nobility.
- December 25 – The 1222 Brescia earthquake is so powerful that the inhabitants of Brescia leave their city en masse and camp outside so that falling buildings would not crush them, according to chronicler Salimbene de Adam.
- Livonian Crusade – The Danish fail in their attempt to conquer Saaremaa Island from the Estonians.
- Ottokar I of Bohemia reunites Bohemia and Moravia.
- The Cistercian convent in Alcobaça, Portugal, is completed.
- Approximate date – The Royal Standard of Scotland is adopted.
- Traditional date – The University of Padua is founded in Italy, by Frederick II, Holy Roman Emperor.

=== Other events, by place ===
==== Mongol Empire ====
- Spring – The Polovtsian army assembles on the Terek River lowlands and are joined by Alan, Circassian, and Don Kipchak/Cuman forces. The Mongol army crosses the Caucasus Mountains, but is trapped in the narrow mountain passes. The Mongol generals Subutai and Jebe (the Arrow) send an embassy to the Polovtsians and convince them to break their alliance with the Caucasian peoples. The Mongol cavalry invades the Caucasus region and devastates the local villages, seizing slaves, cattle and horses.
- The Mongol army invades Polovtsian territory and defeats the Polovtsians in a great battle near the Don River. Several Polovtsian leaders are killed – while the remainder flees westwards, across the Dnieper River, to seek support by various Russian princes. Steppe lands east of the Dnieper fall under Mongol control, Subutai and Jebe raise the wealthy city of Astrakhan on the Volga River. Subutai now parts his forces, he moves south to the Crimea (or Tauric Peninsula), while Jebe travels towards the Dnieper.
- Mongol forces capture the nominally Genoese trading outpost of Sudak, probably with the tacit approval of neighbouring rival Venetian outposts in the Crimea. Subutai promises to destroy any non-Venetian colonies in the area. In return, the Venetians provide Subutai with information about the kingdoms in Eastern Europe. Meanwhile, Köten Khan, Cuman/Kipchak chieftain of the Polovtsians, convinces Prince Mstislav Mstislavich of Galicia to form an alliance, and informs him of his plight against the Mongols.
- February – A council of Russian princes summons at Kiev; several princes are convinced by Köten Khan to assemble an allied army to drive the Mongols back. During the first half of March, Russian princes return to their principalities and begin to raise forces for the forthcoming campaign. The alliance has a combined force of some 60,000 men, mainly cavalry. Subutai unites his army with Jebe, and sends ambassadors to the Kievan Rus' princes, to tell them to stay out of the conflict as it didn't involve them.
- April – The Russian princes lead their separate armies from different parts of Russia, to assemble 60 kilometres downriver from Kiev. There are three main groups of princes taking part in the campaign; the Kievan army is represented by Grand Prince Mstislav Romanovich (the Old). The second group are the Chernigov and Smolensk armies under Prince Mstislav II. The third group is the Galician-Volhynian army under Mstislav Mstislavich with his son-in-law Daniel of Galicia, leaving from northern Ukraine.
- The Mongol leaders Subutai and Jebe receive news that Jochi, who camps north of the Caspian Sea, will not be able to provide the expected reinforcements due to Jochi's reported illness or suspected refusal to obey his father Genghis Khan's orders. Subutai sends an embassy to the Russian princes, to offer peace and perhaps attempt to break the Russian alliance with the Polovtsians. But the Mongol ambassadors are executed – a task eagerly carried out by Köten Khan's followers, by the end of April.
- Late April – The Russian and Polovtsian armies march down the west bank of the Dnieper River. Within a few days of the march beginning, a second group of Mongol ambassadors appear in the Russian camp and again offer peace. When their offers are rebuffed, the ambassadors are allowed to leave unharmed. Meanwhile, Russian forces from Galicia arrive by boat or cart-loads of equipment and food, along the Black Sea coast and up the Dnieper River, screened by Mongol forces on the east bank.
- Late May – The Mongol army under Subutai and Jebe establishes a defensive position on the Kalka River. Increasing disagreements amongst the Russian princes, about the wisdom of continuing to pursue the Mongols deeper into the steppes. By the end of May, the allied forces reach the banks of the Kalka River. The Polovtsian vanguard is way ahead of the rest of the Russian army, which gives them a triumphant feeling. Meanwhile, Subutai and Jebe set up a trap against the Russian forces.
- June – Mstislav Mstislavich escapes back to the Dnieper River with the remnants of his Galician army. Mstislav Romanovich (the Old) surrenders and is executed. According to sources, he and other Russian nobles are slowly suffocated to death during a Mongol 'drunken feast', they are tied up and laid flat on the ground beneath what is described as a wooden 'bridge' (or platform), on which Subutai, Jebe and their officers feast. This is revenge for killing the Mongol ambassadors.
- Battle of Samara Bend: A Volga-Bulgarian army under Ghabdula Chelbir defeats the Mongols, probably led by Subutai, Jebe and Jochi. The Bulgars retreat during the battle but the Mongols pursue them. Then the main Bulgar forces ambush the Mongols. Subutai and Jebe retreat their forces near the city of Sarai (future capital of the Golden Horde), not far from where the Volga River empties into the Caspian Sea.
- Autumn – Mongol forces under Jochi, Subutai and Jebe attack and defeat the Qangl Turks (eastern Kipchaks or Wild Polovtsians), killing their ruler. During the winter, they continue eastwards across the Great Steppe. Jebe (possibly poisoned) suddenly dies of a fever near the Imil River.

==== Europe ====
- Livonian Crusade: The Estonians revolt against the Livonian Brothers of the Sword and Denmark, and for a brief period reconquer all of their strongholds except for Tallinn.

==== Asia ====
- Spring – The Mongol army led by Muqali (or Mukhali) strikes into Shaanxi Province, attacking Chang'an while Genghis khan is invading the Khwarazmian Empire. The garrison (some 200,000 men) in Chang'an is too strong and Muqali is forced to pillage Feng County. During the campaign, Muqali becomes seriously ill and dies, while his forces are consolidating their position on both sides of the Yellow River.

=== January – March ===
- January 14 – Emperor Xuan Zong of the Chinese Jurchen-led Jin dynasty dies after a 10-year reign. He is succeeded by his 25-year-old son, Ai Zong, who conquers more Song territory during the Jin–Song Wars.
- February 20 – Jacopo Tiepolo (later: Doge of the Republic of Venice, 1229–1249), reaches an agreement in his capacity as Podestà, with Robert I, Emperor of Constantinople Latin Emperor, for favorable treatment for the Venetians in the Empire.
- February – King Ferdinand III (the Saint) announces his intention to resume the Reconquista against the realm of the Almohad Caliphate. Caliph Yusuf II al-Mustansir dies and is succeeded by Abu Muhammad al-Wahid, but in Al-Andalus, two competing pretenders also claim their rights to the throne: Abu Muhammad Ibn al-Mansur al-Adil in Seville and Abu Muhammad abu Abdallah al-Bayyasi in Córdoba. The chronic political instability on the Almohad site allows Ferdinand to begin his campaign victoriously in October, with the capture of Quesada in Spain.
- March 1 – Pope Honorius III sends a letter to the Roman Catholic Patriarch of Jerusalem, Francisco Clemente Pérez Capera, notifying him that the armies and navies of the Holy Roman Empire, the Teutonic Knights and the Kingdom of Sicily will be departing soon to begin the Sixth Crusade to recapture Jerusalem from the Arab rulers.

=== April – June ===
- April 23 – William Marshal, 2nd Earl of Pembroke, one of the enforcers of the Magna Carta, marries Eleanor of England, Countess of Leicester, the nine-year-old daughter of the late King John of England and sister of King Henry III, in order to strengthen the Marshal family's connection with the House of Plantagenet.
- May 5 – King Louis VIII (the Lion) declares war on King Henry III of England. He allies himself with Hugh X of Lusignan and invades first Poitou and then Northern Gascony. The English forces in Poitou are under-strength and lack support from the Poitevin nobles; as a result, the province quickly falls into French hands by the end of June.
- June 5 – The University of Naples is founded by Emperor Frederick II. Frederick's main purpose is to create an institution of higher learning that will put an end to the predominance of the universities of northern Italy, most notably these of Bologna and Padua, which are considered either too independent or under the strong influence of Pope Honorius III.
- June 20 – The siege of Bedford Castle by King Henry III of England begins.

=== July – September ===
- July 16 – (28th day of 6th month of Gennin 1); Hōjō Yasutoki becomes the new regent (shikken) for the Kamakura shogunate in Japan after the death of his father, Hōjō Yoshitoki.
- August 15 – The garrison at Bedford Castle, belonging to Falkes de Bréauté, surrenders to Henry III after a two-month siege that ends after the castle has been undermined by a fire and fallen. After the garrison surrenders, the defenders are all hanged by order of the king. Falkes is allowed to leave the country but loses all his possessions. Bedford Castle is badly damaged as a result.
- September 14 – Francis of Assisi, while praying on the mountain of La Verna during a 40-day fast, has a vision, as a result of which he receives the stigmata. Brother Leo, who is with Francis at the time, leaves a clear and simple account of this event, the first definite account of the phenomenon of stigmata.
- September 17 – Emperor Ning Zong of the Chinese Song dynasty dies at Hangzhou, possibly from poisoning, after a 30-year reign. He is succeeded by his relative, Li Zong, as all of Ning Zong's children have died.
- September – Abdallah al-Adil (the Just), governor in Al-Andalus, challenges the Almohad throne and captures Seville. He marches to Marrakesh to confront Abu Muhammad al-Wahid. Abdallah seizes the royal palace and deposes Muhammad al-Wahid, who is strangled to death.

=== October – December ===
- October – Lý Huệ Tông, Emperor of Vietnam, cedes the throne to his second daughter, the Princess Chiêu Thánh, who becomes the Empress Regnant Lý Chiêu Hoàng. Trần Thủ Độ then arranges a marriage between the Empress and Trần Cảnh, the 8-year-old son of Trần Thừa, and ends the rule of the Lý dynasty by making the Empress pass the throne to Trần Cảnh the following year.
- November 24 – Representatives of King Louis VIII of France and Frederick II, Holy Roman Emperor, sign a treaty at Catania, providing that neither of the monarchs would harbor rebels from the other.
- December – Theodore Komnenos (Doukas), ruler of the Despotate of Epirus, captures Thessaloniki – beginning the de facto Byzantine Empire of Thessalonica. Later, Theodore Komnenos was crowned Byzantine emperor but is not recognized as such by the rest of the Greek or Latin population.

=== By place ===
==== Byzantine Empire ====
- Spring – Battle of Poimanenon: Byzantine forces under Emperor John III (Doukas Vatatzes', ruler of Nicaea, defeat the Latin army under the brothers Alexios Laskaris and Isaac Laskaris. They begin a revolt and decide to aid the request of Emperor Robert I of Courtenay. The two armies meet at Poimanenon, south of Cyzicus in Mysia, near Lake Kuş ("Bird Lake"). In the ensuing battle, John III achieves a decisive victory; among the captives taken are the two Laskaris brothers, who are blinded. The victory opens the way for the recovery by the Byzantines of most of the Latin possessions in Asia Minor.

==== Europe ====
- Livonian Crusade: The Livonian Brothers of the Sword defeat the Estonians and reconquer the captured strongholds on the Estonian mainland. With the surrender of the Tartu stronghold, only the islands of Saaremaa and Muhu remain under Estonian control.
- Spring – Falkes de Bréauté, English high sheriff and a rival of Henry III, refuses to relinquish his castles and starts a rebellion. Cardinal Stephen Langton and forces under Hubert de Burgh deal with Falkes and the castles are handed over. Falkes is found guilty of 16 counts of wrongful disseisin; he and his brother William are excommunicated by Langton.

==== Asia ====
- Spring – The Mongol army led by Subutai and Jochi cross the steppes of modern Kazakhstan, and returns to the horde of Genghis Khan on the Irtysh River. At a great kurultai or gathering of chiefs, Subutai reports on the Western campaign. Jochi submits to Genghis and his supposed 'insubordination' (see 1220) is forgiven. As a result of the Mongol invasion in 1219–1223, Kazakhstan and Central Asia become part of the Mongol Empire.

=== January – March ===
- January 11 – Albrecht of Orlamünde, Denmark's governor of Nordalbingia, meets with numerous nobles in Segeberg and marches with his cousin Otto of Lüneburg against Henry I, Count of Schwerin, the ally of Adolf, Count of Schauerburg. Days later, Albrecht and Henry fight the Battle of Mölln in what is now the German state of Schleswig-Holstein, where Albrecht is taken as a prisoner of war.
- February 11 –
  - The Charter of the Forest is restored to its traditional rights by King Henry III. 'Free men' are allowed to find pasture for their pigs, collect firewood, graze animals, or cut turf for fuel. At this time, however, only about 10 percent of the population is 'free', the rest are locked into service to a local landowner, some of them little more than slaves.
  - The Magna Carta is reaffirmed (for the third time) by Henry III, in return for issuing a property tax. It becomes the definitive version of the text.
- March 3 – As the envoy of Pope Honorius III, Romanus, Cardinal-deacon of San Angelo, leaves Rome to travel to France to the court of King Louis XIII.
- March 23 – Prince Richard of Cornwall, brother of King Henry III of England, and his uncle William Longsword, Earl of Salisbury, depart England on with 77 warriors on an expedition to fight in Aquitaine in France, and soon land at Bordeaux, then on to capture La Rochelle. As the expedition progresses, Richard's expedition captures La Réole and Bergerac by November.

=== April – June ===
- April 15 – Pope Honorius III issues the papal bull Magistro Andree canonico Palentino, granting the Andree, a former Jew who converted to Christianity, the title of canon of Palencia, with full eccleastical dignities.
- May 10 – Gerold of Lausanne, French bishop of Valence, becomes the new Latin patriarch of Jerusalem (until 1239).
- May 15 – Pope Honorius exhorts Hungarian Catholics to launch the Bosnian Crusade against the autonomous Bosnian Church Christians.
- May 25 – At his royal palace in Bergen, King Haakon IV of Norway marries Margaret Skulesdatter, daughter of Haakon's rival for the throne, Skule Bårdsson.
- May 30 – King Louis VII of France meets in Péronne with a hermit who claims to be Baldwin IX, Count of Flanders and the Latin Emperor of Constantinople, who had not been seen in public since being taken a prisoner in Bulgaria. Concluding that the hermit is an impostor, King Louis gives the man three days to leave France, and the "false Baldwin" instead leads a rebellion, eventually losing and being executed.
- June 10 – Pope Honorius III issues the bull Vineae Domini custodes in which he approves the mission of two friars to Morocco. The bull is reissued in October when Honorius III exhorts the Dominican and Franciscan order to participate in that mission.

=== July – September ===
- July 25 –
  - Jalal al-Din Mangburni dethrones Muzaffar al-Din Uzbek, ruler (atabeg) of the Eldiguzids, and sets himself up in the capital of Tabriz (modern Iran).
  - Emperor Frederick II takes an oath at San Germano (near Cassino) and promises to depart on a Crusade (the Sixth Crusade), for the Near East in August 1227. He sends 1000 knights to the Levant and provides Rome with 100,000 ounces of gold, to be forfeited to the Catholic Church should he break his vow. These funds will be returned to Frederick once he arrives at Acre.
- July 25 – The Agreement of San Germano is signed between the Holy Roman Emperor Frederick II and Pope Honorius III, with the Emperor Frederick agreeing to lead the Sixth Crusade to recapture Jerusalem and the rest of the Christian Holy Land in the Middle East from the Muslims. In return for the financing and the provision of soldiers by the Catholis Church in Syria, Frederick agrees to launch the Crusade on or before August 15, 1227.
- July 27 – Visby Cathedral in Sweden is consecrated.
- August 19 – Rolando Rossi di Parma becomes the new leader of the Republic of Pisa, which had been governed by an official from the Duchy of Milan since September of 1224.
- September 11 – The Republic of Massa is founded in Central Italy with Bernardino del fu Losco as its first podesta appointed by the council of nine lords to serve as executive of the independent state.

=== October – December ===
- October 5 – Caliph Al-Nasir dies from dysentery at Baghdad after a 45-year reign. He is succeeded by his son Al-Zahir as ruler of the Abbasid Caliphate.
- November 9 – Frederick II marries the 14-year-old Queen Yolande, heiress to the kingdom of Jerusalem, and adds the Crusader States to his dominions.
- November 17 – After being taken prisoner of war at the Battle of Mölln in January, the Danish governor Albrecht signs the Peace of Bardowick in order to obtain his freedom, ceding Holstein to Adolf of Schauenberg, in addition to releasing King Valdemar II of Denmark and his son Valdemar the Younger, who both had been kidnapped in 1223 and held as prisoners.
- November 29 – The 12-year-old Henry VII, by order of his father Frederick II, marries Margaret of Austria, daughter of Duke Leopold VI the Glorious.
- December 31 – Lý Chiêu Hoàng, the only empress regnant in the history of Vietnam, marries Trần Thái Tông, making him the first ruler of the Trần dynasty.

=== By place ===
==== Mongol Empire ====
- Autumn – Subutai is assigned a new campaign by Genghis Khan against the Tanguts. He crosses the Gobi Desert with a Mongol army and advances south into the Western Xia (or Xi Xia). Meanwhile, Genghis, in his mid-sixties, becomes wounded during hunting. His injury – a dislocated shoulder, perhaps, or a bruised rib – forces him to take some rest.
- Iltutmish, Ghurid ruler of the Delhi Sultanate, repels a Mongol attack and invades Bengal. His rival, Ghiyasuddin, leads an army to halt Iltutmish's advance, but decides to avoid a conflict by paying him tribute and accepting his suzerainty.

==== Europe ====
- The Teutonic Knights are expelled from Transylvania by King Andrew II, because they wanted to separate from Hungary.

==== Middle East ====
- Summer – Battle of Garni: Khwarezmid forces led by Jalal al-Din Mangburni defeat the Georgian army (some 70,000 men) at Garni. The royal court of Queen Rusudan moves to Kutaisi, while the Georgian capital Tbilisi is besieged by the Khwarezmians.

==== Levant ====
- The 8-year-old Henry I (the Fat) is crowned as king of Cyprus in the Cathedral of Saint Sophia at Nicosia. His uncle Philip of Ibelin orders the coronation, so that when Henry comes of age at fifteen a regency could not be prolonged on the ground that he is not yet crowned.

=== January – March ===
- January 11 – At Đông Kinh (now Hanoi), Trần Thái Tông begins a 32-year reign as the Vietnamese Emperor of Dai Viet, beginning the Trần dynasty.
- January 30 –
  - Pope Honorius II approves the "Rule of Saint Albert (written by Saint Albert Avoggadro of Vercelli as the guide for the Carmelites (the Order of the Brothers of the Blessed Virgin Mary of Mount Carmel) with the papal bull Ut vivendi normam.
  - King Louis VIII of France takes the cross to resume the Albigensian Crusade against the Catharism movement in Languedoc in southern France.
- February 20 – Pope Honorius II directs the Franciscan Archbishop of Toledo, Rodrigo Jiménez de Rada, to lead the Franciscans in converting Moroccan Muslims to Christianity.
- February 25 – (Karoku 2, 27th day of 1st month) In Japan, 8-year-old Kujō Yoritsune is raised to the status of the Shōgun Fujiwara no Yoritsune of the Kamakura shogunate by the Emperor Go-Horikawa, but the power over the Imperial military remains with the regent Hōjō Yoshitoki.
- March 4 – Just before dawn, a great conjunction between Saturn and Jupiter is observed from Earth. The conjunction is more significant than other occurrences because the separation of the two planets as visible in the sky of Earth (2.1 arcminutes or 1/30th of one degree of arc) will not be closer again until March 8, 4523 CE, and the close conjunction is the most easily visible from Earth until the conjunction of December 21, 2020.
- March 9 – Khwarazmian Empire forces commanded by the Muslim Sultan Jalal al-Din Mangburni capture Tbilisi, capital of the Kingdom of Georgia. After the capture, the massacre of thousands of its Christian inhabitants begins as residents are given the choice between converting to Islam or being put to death.
- March 26 – Frederick II, Holy Roman Emperor issues the Golden Bull of Rimini, in which he grants Teutonic Knights the right to all of the lands they will get during the mission in Prussia; he also declares himself a senior of the Teutonic Order and Poland, as well as the universal ruler of Christian Europe.

=== April – June ===
- April 5 – The Treaty of Melun is concluded between France (ruled by King Louis VIII) and Flanders, ruled jointly of by Jeanne, Countess of Flanders and Hainaut, with France agreeing to release her husband Count Ferrand (who had been a prisoner of war since 1214 in return for payment by Flanders of 50,000 livres in two installments, with Lille, Douai, and Sluis to be occupied by French troops until the debt is paid. In addition, Ferrand and Jeanne agree to swear their loyalty to King Louis, and to require that all Flemish nobles, knight and burghers take a similar oath of loyalty, including a promise not to support the Count of Flanders if he backs out of the treaty.
- May 14 – At the age of 11, Queen Isabella (Zabel), daughter of the dead King Leo, is formally crowned as the Queen of the Armenian Kingdom of Cilicia, in a ceremony at the Armenian capital, Sis.
- May 17 – Ralph Neville is appointed as the new Lord Chancellor of England by the Great Council of Regency, regent for the Kingdom of England during the reign of King Henry III.
- June 7 – King Louis VIII of France begins the Crusade against the Cathars (Albigensians) in southern France and against Raymond VII, count of Count of Toulouse. Over the next three months, the Crusaders capture the cities of Béziers, Carcassonne, Beaucaire and Marseille and by Avignon's surrender on September 9, Louis forces the region of Languedoc into submission, and reasserts his authority upon the autonomous municipalities of his estates. Most cities have to accept the authority of Ramon Berenguer IV, count of Provence, but Marseille and Nice rebel.

=== July – September ===
- July 10 – In Baghdad, Al-Mānsūr al-Mustansir bi-llah (known as Al-Mustansir I) becomes the new Caliph of the adherents of Islam (and the 36th of the Abbasid dyansty), succeeding his father, al-Zahir bi-Amr Allah, who died only nine months after succeeding to the Caliphate.
- August 8 – Siege of Avignon: After two months without forcing the defenders of Avignon to surrender from lack of food, King Louis VIII gives the order to assault the walls of the city and Guy II, Count of Saint-Pol, begins the second phase of the siege, digging trenches facing the city walls – which are connected on both sides of the Rhône with pontoon bridges. Firing from the fortress towers, the defenders repulse the attack and Count Guy is killed by a catapulted stone on the same day.
- August – At Xingqing in what is now China's Yinchuan province, Emperor Xianzong of the Western Xia Empire dies after a three-year reign, and is succeeded by his nephew, Li Xian. The Mongols under Genghis Khan force the surrender of Western Xia the following year, bringing an end to the Yinchuan province as a separate nation.
- September 9 – After Avignon's defenders negotiate a peaceful resolution with the French Army by the payment of an indemnity of 6,000 marks, the gates of the walled city are opened and Louis enters the city without violence.
- September 11 – The Catholic Church practice of eucharistic adoration among lay people formally begins in Avignon, Provence.

=== October – December ===
- October 30 – Trần Thủ Độ, head of the Trần dynasty of Vietnam, forces Lý Huệ Tông, the last emperor of the Lý dynasty, to commit suicide.
- November 8 – At the age of 12, Louis IX becomes the new King of France when his father, King Louis VIII, dies of dysentery at the Château de Montpensier while on his way back home after victory in the Albigensian Crusade. The boy's mother, Queen Blanche of Castile, rules the kingdom as regent during his minority.
- November 29 – The coronation of Louis IX as King of France takes place at the Reims Cathedral at the direction of Queen Blanche, who also orders the defeated French nobles from the Albigensian Crusade to swear allegiance to her son.
- December 23 – Jean Halgrin, the French Roman Catholic archbishop of Besançon, is offered the opportunity to be the Catholic patriarch of Constantinople, but declines the position because of health issues.F. Vigouroux (1912). Dictionnaire de la Bible. Vol. I. Letouzey et Ané.

=== By place ===
==== Europe ====
- The Teutonic Knights undertake a new Crusade, attempting to subdue the pagan Prussians, who occupy a part of the Baltic coast. They are invited to Poland by High Duke Konrad I of Masovia, a grandson of Bolesław III Wrymouth. Their task is to defend Masovia against raids of the Prussians. After defeating them, the German knights set up their own state, which they named after the pagan people they have all but annihilated – Prussia.
- King Sancho II of Portugal ("the Pious") launches an offensive against the Almohad Caliphate during the Reconquista, and takes the city of Elvas.
- Rǫgnvaldr Guðrøðarson is overthrown as ruler of the Kingdom of the Isles, and is replaced by his half-brother, Olaf the Black.

==== Mongol Empire ====
- Summer – Genghis Khan starts a campaign against the Tanguts, punishing the vassal kingdom of Western Xia (Xi Xia) for not contributing to the Mongol invasions. He assembles a large force (some 100,000 men), and lays siege to Liangzhou, second-largest city in Western Xia, which surrenders without resistance. In the autumn, Genghis crosses the Helan Mountains, and in November he lays siege to Lingwu. Meanwhile, Emperor Xianzong of Western Xia dies and is succeeded by his nephew Mo (or Li Xian).

=== By topic ===
==== Art and culture ====
- Brother Robert writes the Old Norse Tristrams saga ok Ísöndar, one of the rare fully surviving versions of the legend of Tristan and Iseult.

==== Religion ====
- The Carmelite Order is approved by Pope Honorius III in the bull Ut vivendi normam.

=== By place ===
==== Europe ====
- Spring – Livonian Crusade: The Livonian Brothers of the Sword and their Crusader allies (some 20,000 men) cross the sea ice from mainland Estonia, and defeat the last Estonian strongholds in the Battle of Muhu and the siege of the Valjala Stronghold in the Saaremaa islands. This marks the end of the Estonian campaign in the Livonian Crusade. The Sword Brothers conquer Danish Estonia, and Tallinn is given town rights under Riga law.
- July 22 – Battle of Bornhöved: Count Adolf IV of Holstein – leading a coalition army from the cities of Lübeck and Hamburg, defeats the Danish-German forces of King Valdemar II, and the Welf nobleman Otto I (the Child). Adolf shakes off Danish supremacy and accepts an overlordship by the Archbishopric of Bremen under Archbishop Gerhard II of Lippe. Adolf expands his power and establishes new frontiers within the Holy Roman Empire.
- July 28 – Battle of Ane: Forces of the Bishopric of Utrecht are defeated by the rebellious Drenths led by Rudolph van Coevorden near Ane (modern Netherlands). The Drenths lure the Bishop's forces, supported by heavily armoured knights, in an ambush into a swampy area and kill Bishop Otto II of Lippe. After the battle, Otto's successor, Wilbrand van Oldenburg, rouses the Frisian people into supporting the war against the Drenths.
- August – Emperor Frederick II musters a German expeditionary force in Apulia. The crowded conditions and high heat contribute to discontent and disease among the assembled troops. On September 24, an epidemic of malaria enfeebles the army at Brindisi. Several thousand Crusaders led by Henry IV, duke of Limburg, and French and English mercenaries under the bishops Peter des Roches and William Briwere, arrive at Acre.
- September – A second contingent joined by Frederick II, departs from Brindisi to the Levant. On September 11, during the second day of the voyage, one of Fredericks' companions, Louis IV of Thuringia, dies of an illness (possibly cholera) at Otranto. Frederick also becomes sick and decides to return home, while sending the rest of the Crusader fleet (20 galleys) to Acre. There, they fortify the coastal towns of Caesarea and Jaffa.
- October 10 – Frederick II recovering at Pozzuoli, receives a letter from Pope Gregory IX, announcing his ex-communication. Frederick is branded a wanton violator of his sacred oath taken many times, at Aachen, Ferentino, Veroli and San Germano. Meanwhile, the Crusader army fortifies Sidon Sea Castle and rebuilds Montfort Castle, northeast of Acre, as a new headquarter castle for the Teutonic Knights, who called it Starkenburg.
- Swedish-Novgorodian War: Grand Prince Yaroslav II of Vladimir leads an attack from the Novgorod Republic on Baltic Finnic peoples in eastern Fennoscandia, called "Yem", whom he devastates.
- November 24 – Prince Leszek I (the White) is assassinated in an ambush on a council of Polish dukes in the city of Gąsawa, an event which later becomes known as the Gąsawa Massacre.

==== Mongol Empire ====
- Autumn – Prince Tolui, Mongol regent and youngest son of Genghis Khan, assembles a Kurultai in the homelands of Mongolia. He persuades the chieftains of the clan to carry out Genghis' wishes. Ögedei Khan receives the Great Khanate. Genghis' eldest son, Jochi, dies before him, and his lands are divided between his two sons Batu Khan and Orda Khan, who rule the Western provinces (the Golden Horde and White Horde). Genghis' second son, Chagatai Khan, inherits the former Uigur and Kara-Khanid Khanate (now called the Chagatai Khanate). Tolui receives the Mongol homelands.

==== Levant ====
- November 12 – Al-Mu'azzam Isa, Ayyubid ruler of Damascus, dies after a 11-year reign. He is succeeded by his 21-year-old son, An-Nasir Dawud, who faces opposition from his uncle, Sultan Al-Kamil of Egypt.

==== England ====
- Spring – The 19-year-old Henry III assumes control of the government. He appoints Hubert de Burgh as Governor of Rochester Castle and rewards him with the title Earl of Kent.

==== Asia ====
- Siege of Yinchuan: Mongol forces eliminate the Western Xia (or Xi Xia) and execute Emperor Mo (or Li Xian). Genghis Khan dies during the siege under debated circumstances, but this is kept secret from the army until the siege's end. Yinchuan is pillaged and its entire population is slaughtered or sold into slavery. Genghis orders the imperial family to be executed, effectively ending the Tangut royal lineage.
- August 18 – Genghis Khan dies during the fall of Yinchuan after a 21-year reign. His exact cause of death remains a mystery, and is variously attributed to being killed in action against the Western Xia, illness, falling from his horse, or wounds sustained during hunting. Genghis is succeeded by his third son, Ögedei Khan, who becomes the "Great Khan" of the Mongol Empire.

=== By topic ===
==== Cities and Towns ====
- January 11 – The city of Požga in Croatia is first mentioned, in a charter of King Andrew II of Hungary.
- Northleach in the Cotswolds, U.K. is granted a charter by King Henry III.

==== Religion ====
- Dōgen Zenji receives Dharma transmission and inka from his master Rujing in China, settling his "life's quest of the great matter", going on to introduce Sōtō Zen Buddhism into his native Japan.
- March 18 – Pope Honorius III dies at Rome after a pontificate of nearly 11 years. He is succeeded by Gregory IX as the 178th pope of the Catholic Church.
- September 29 – Gregory IX excommunicates Frederick II, due to his broken promises and delay of the Sixth Crusade.

=== By place ===
==== Sixth Crusade ====
- Summer – Emperor Frederick II sails from Brindisi with an expeditionary force and arrives in Acre in the Middle East on September 7. He disembarks a well-trained and equipped Crusader army (some 10,000 men and 2,000 knights). After his arrival in Palestine, Frederick is again excommunicated by Pope Gregory IX, for setting out for the Crusade before he has obtained absolution from his previous ex-communication (see 1227). Many of the local nobility, the Knights Templar and Knights Hospitaller deny him their support for the Crusade. Frederick can only rely on his own army and the Teutonic Knights, whose Grand Master, Hermann von Salza, is his friend.
- Autumn – Frederick II receives an embassy of Egypt's Sultan Al-Kamil, including Fakhr al-Din ibn as-Shaikh, at the Hospitaller camp at Recordane, near Acre. Meanwhile, Al-Kamil is engaged in suppressing a rebellion in Syria and has concentrated his forces on a siege at Damascus. Frederick is pressed for time, because his army is not large enough for a major campaign. Al-Kamil, who has full control of Jerusalem, starts diplomatic negotiations.
- November – Frederick II puts pressure on the negotiations by a military display. He assembles his Crusader army and marches down the coast to Jaffa – which he proceeds to refortify. At the same moment, Ayyubid forces under An-Nasir Dawud, who are not participating in the revolt at Damascus, move to Nablus, to intercept Al-Kamil's supply lines. Al-Kamil breaks off the negotiations, saying that the Crusaders have pillaged several Muslim villages, and only resumes them again when Frederick pays out compensation to the victims.

==== Europe ====
- April 25 – The 16-year-old Isabella II, Holy Roman Empress and wife of Frederick II, dies after giving birth to her second child, Conrad IV, at Andria. He receives the title King of Jerusalem (as Conrad II) – with Frederick as regent. By his father, Conrad is the grandson of the Hohenstaufen Emperor Henry VI and great-grandson of the late Emperor Frederick I (Barbarossa).
- Emperor Robert I (or Courtenay) dies after a 7-year reign in Morea (Southern Greece). He is succeeded by his 11-year-old brother, Baldwin II, as ruler of the Latin Empire in Constantinople, with John of Brienne as regent.
- King James I (the Conqueror) launches a major offensive against the Almohads in Majorca. At the same moment, Emir Ibn Hud al-Yamadi (confronted by increasing Christian pressure) denounces Almohad rule in Murcia (modern Spain) and acknowledges the Abbasid Caliphate as legitimate overlord, in effect declaring independence. Other notable Christian success: King Alfonso IX of León conquers Mérida.
- December 23 – Stephen of Anagni, Italian papal chaplain, is commissioned to collect a special tax in England, Ireland, Scotland and Wales to finance Gregory X's War of the Keys against Frederick II.

==== Asia ====
- Battle of Bolnisi: Khwarazmian forces led by Sultan Jalal al-Din Mangburni defeat a coalition of Georgians, Kipchaks, Alans, Vainakhs and Laks (some 40,000 men) at Bolnisi (modern Georgia).
- King Sukaphaa establishes the Ahom Dynasty and becomes the first Ahom ruler in Assam (until 1268).

=== By topic ===
==== Cities and Towns ====
- The Transylvanian town of Reghin is first mentioned, in a charter of King Andrew II of Hungary.

==== Markets ====
- The city of Tournai emits its first recorded life annuity, thus confirming a trend of consolidation of public debts started ten years earlier, in Reims.
- The first evidence is uncovered of the use of the Knights Templar as cashiers by King Henry III of England, to safely transfer important sums to the continent, using letters of exchange. This shows that large transfers could take place across Europe, even before the emergence of important networks of Italian merchant-bankers.

==== Religion ====
- July 16 – Saint Francis of Assisi is canonized by Gregory IX.

=== By place ===
==== Sixth Crusade ====
- February 18 – Treaty of Jaffa: Emperor Frederick II signs a 10-year truce together with Sultan Al-Kamil and his representatives; he manages to regain many parts of the Holy Land through political negotiation, rather than by resorting to military force or directly confronting the Muslim army. Frederick's achievements, including the control of Jerusalem (without the Temple Mount) and Bethlehem, with a corridor running through Lydda to the sea of Jaffa, as well as Nazareth and western Galilee, including Montfort Castle and Toron, and the remaining Muslim districts around Sidon. All Muslims are to be allowed the right of entry in Jerusalem and freedom of worship.
- March 17 – Frederick II enters Jerusalem, escorted by German and Italian troops. Of the Military Orders only the Teutonic Knights are represented and some clergy. He receives the formal surrender of the city by Al-Kamil's governor (or Qadi), who hands him the keys of Jerusalem. The procession then passes through streets to the old building of the Hospital (or the Muristan), where Frederick takes up his residence in the Christian Quarter.
- March 18 – Frederick II crowns himself as King of Jerusalem in an impromptu ceremony in the Church of the Holy Sepulchre. After the ceremony, he proceeds to the palace of the Hospitallers – where he holds a council to discuss the defense of Jerusalem. Frederick orders the Tower of David and the Gate of St. Stephen are to be repaired at once and he hands over the royal residence attached to the Tower of David to the Teutonic Order.
- May 1 – Frederick II departs from Acre, while he and his suite pass down the "Street of the Butchers" to the harbour, the people crowd out of the doors, and pelts him with entrails and dung. Meanwhile, Odo of Montbéliard (or Eudes), commander of the Crusader army, and John of Ibelin, lord of Beirut, are left behind to quell the unrest in Palestine.
- May – Frederick II arrives at Cyprus, where he attends the wedding proxy of the 12-year-old King Henry I (the Fat) to Alice of Montferrat – whose father is one of his staunch supporters in Italy. On June 10, Frederick lands at Brindisi, where the papal army under his father-in-law John of Brienne has invaded the Italian territories in Campania (→ War of the Keys).
- Autumn – Frederick II recovers the lost Italian territories and tries to condemn the leading rebel barons, but avoids crossing the frontiers of the Papal States. Meanwhile, a first serious raid on Jerusalem is made by a mass of unorganized Beduins and plunderers of pilgrims. An advance guard encouraged the Christians to expel the Muslims.

==== Europe ====
- January 23 – The episcopal seat is moved from Nousiainen to Koroinen (located near the current centre of Turku) by the permission of Pope Gregory IX. The date is starting to be considered as the founding of Turku.
- March 6 – University of Paris strike: Students begin to riot, after a dispute over a bill with a tavern proprietor. Queen Blanche of Castile demands retribution, and allows the city guard to punish the student rioters. She puts an economic strain upon the student quarter of Paris (the Latin Quarter), where Latin is commonly heard in the streets.
- April 12 – Treaty of Paris: Count Raymond VII is forced to sign a peace treaty (also known as the "Treaty of Meaux"). This brings the Albigensian Crusade to an end. Raymond regains his feudal rights but has to swear his allegiance to King Louis IX (the Saint). The fortifications, such as these of Avignon and Toulouse, are dismantled.
- September 5 – A Catalan-Aragonese expeditionary army under King James I (the Conqueror) embarks with 155 ships, 1,500 knights and 15,000 men from Tarragona, Salou, and Cambrils, in southern Catalonia. He sets sail to conquer Majorca. On December 31, James finally conquers the island from the Almohad ruler, Abu Yahya.
- November 28 – Battle of Olustra: Eric XI (the Lisp and Lame) is defeated and deposed as king of Sweden by Canute II (the Tall), who proclaims himself the new ruler.

==== England ====
- October 13 – King Henry III calls for an army to be assembled at Portsmouth to be transported to Normandy to regain lost territories from the French. A large army of knights turns up ready to go but not enough ships have been provided. Henry blames Hubert de Burgh for the fiasco and in his rage will have killed him if Ranulf of Chester has not intervened. This marks the beginning of the rift between Henry and Hubert de Burgh. Meanwhile, the expedition is postponed until mid-1230.

==== Levant ====
- June – Emir Al-Ashraf Musa captures Damascus and acknowledges the supremacy of his elder brother Al-Kamil. His other brother, An-Nasir Dawud, is compensated with the lordship of Al-Karak in the Transjordan region.

==== Africa ====
- Abu Zakariya Yahya expands his influence by conquering the cities of Constantine and Béjaïa (modern Algeria). He becomes the founder and first ruler of the Hafsid Dynasty in Ifriqiya.

==== Asia ====
- September 13 – Ögedei Khan, the third son of Genghis Khan is proclaimed "Great Khan" of the Mongol Empire, at a Kurultai council.

=== By topic ===
==== Religion ====
- Council of Toulouse: The Catholic Church permanently establishes the Inquisition, in the charge of the Dominican Order in Rome.
- The University of Toulouse is founded in France. Raymond VII is forced to finance the teaching of theology.

== Significant people ==
- Abu Muhammad al-Wahid, Almohad Caliph of Morocco
- Abu Zakariya, first Sultan of the Hafsid Dynasty of Ifriqiya
- Adolf IV, Count of Schauenburg and Holstein
- Alfonso IX, King of León and Galicia
- Andrew II, King of Hungary and Croatia
- Baldwin II, Latin Emperor of Constantinople
- Konrad I, Duke of Masovia and Kujawy and High Duke of Poland
- Conrad IV, King of Jerusalem
- Chiconquiauhtzin, Tlatoani of Azcapotzalco
- Chūkyō, Emperor of Japan
- Dōgen, founder of the Sōtō school of Zen Buddhism in Japan
- Erik XI, King of Sweden
- Ferdinand III, King of Castile and Toledo
- Saint Francis of Assisi, Roman Catholic saint
- Frederick II, Holy Roman Emperor
- Genghis Khan, first Great Khan of the Mongol Empire
- Emperor Go-Horikawa of Japan
- Emperor Go-Toba of Japan
- Pope Gregory IX
- Henry III, King of England, Lord of Ireland, and Duke of Aquitaine
- Pope Honorius III
- Iltutmish, first Sultan of the Delhi Sultanate
- Jalal al-Din Mangburni, final Sultan of the Khwarazmian Empire
- James I, King of Aragon and Count of Barcelona
- Jochi, Mongol army commander and eldest son of Genghis Khan
- John of Brienne, King of Jerusalem and Latin Emperor of Constantinople
- John I, King of Sweden
- John III Doukas Vatatzes, Emperor of Nicaea
- Emperor Juntoku of Japan
- Al-Kamil, Ayyubid Sultan of Egypt
- Knut II, King of Sweden
- Leszek I the White, Duke of Sandomierz and High Duke of Poland
- Louis VIII, King of France
- Louis IX, King of France
- Lý Chiêu Hoàng, Empress of Vietnam
- Lý Huệ Tông, Emperor of Vietnam
- Manqu Qhapaq, first Emperor of the Inca Empire
- Ögedei Khan, second Great Khan of the Mongol Empire, third son of Genghis Khan
- Olaf the Black, King of the Isles
- Ottokar I, King of Bohemia
- Ramon Berenguer IV, Count of Provence and Count of Forcalquier
- Rǫgnvaldr Guðrøðarson, King of the Isles
- Rujing, Caodong Buddhist monk and Zen master
- Sancho II, King of Portugal
- Stephen Langton, Archbishop of Canterbury
- Subutai, Mongol commander and primary military strategist of the Mongol Empire
- Sukaphaa, first King of Ahom
- Theodore Komnenos Doukas, Despot of Epirus and Emperor of Thessalonika
- Tolui, Mongol commander and regent of the Mongol Empire, fourth son of Genghis Khan
- Trần Thái Tông, Emperor of Vietnam
- Trần Thủ Độ, military commander and regent of the Empire of Vietnam
- Valdemar II, King of Denmark
- Yuri II, Grand Prince of Vladimir
- Yaroslav, Prince of Novgorod
- Yusuf II al-Mustansir, Almohad Caliph of Morocco

== Births ==
1220

- March 7 – Giacomo Bianconi, Italian priest (d. 1301)
- April 1 – Go-Saga, Japanese emperor (d. 1272)
- April 16 – Ambrose of Sienna, Italian missionary (d. 1287)
- November 11 – Alphonse II, count of Poitiers (d. 1271)
- Adolf VII, German nobleman and knight (d. 1259)
- Bertold of Regensburg, German preacher (d. 1272)
- Bonagiunta Orbicciani, Italian judge and poet (d. 1290)
- Brunetto Latini, Italian notary and philosopher (d. 1294)
- Campanus of Novara, Italian astronomer (d. 1296)
- Elisenda de Sant Climent, Catalan slave (d. 1275)
- Frederick III, burgrave of Nuremberg (d. 1297)
- Gerard of Abbeville, French theologian (d. 1272)
- Guido Guerra V, Italian knight and politician (d. 1272)
- Hillel ben Samuel, Italian philosopher (d. 1295)
- Hugh III, French nobleman and knight (d. 1266)
- James Audley, English chief governor (d. 1272)
- Joan, French noblewoman and co-ruler (d. 1271)
- Joan of Dammartin, French noblewoman (d. 1279)
- Margaret of Bar, countess of Luxembourg (d. 1275)
- Mieszko II (the Fat), duke of Kalisz-Wieluń (d. 1246)
- Mohammad Rohani, Afghan religious leader (d. 1305)
- Robert de Vere, English nobleman and knight (d. 1296)
- Roger Bacon, English philosopher and writer (d. 1292)
- Tanhum of Jerusalem, Israeli lexicographer (d. 1291)
- Walram II, German nobleman and knight (d. 1276)
- Walter Branscombe, bishop of Exeter (d. 1280)

1221

- May 13 – Alexander Nevsky, Kievan Grand Prince (d. 1263)
- June 4 – Przemysł I, Polish nobleman and knight (d. 1257)
- October 9 – Salimbene di Adam, Italian chronicler (d. 1290)
- November 2 – Saif al-Din Qutuz, Egyptian military leader (d. 1260)
- November 23 – Alfonso X ("the Wise"), king of Castile (d. 1284)
- Barisone III, Sardinian judge of Logudoro (or Torres) (d. 1236)
- Bonaventure, Italian theologian and philosopher (d. 1274)
- Hugh XI of Lusignan, French nobleman and knight (d. 1250)
- Margaret of Provence, queen consort of France (d. 1295)
- Nisshō, Japanese Buddhist priest and teacher (d. 1323)
- Theobald II, Count of Bar, French nobleman and knight (d. 1291)
- Walter Devereux, Anglo-Norman nobleman and knight (d. 1292)
- William Mauduit, 8th Earl of Warwick, English nobleman and knight (d. 1268)

1222

- February 16 – Nichiren, founder of Nichiren Buddhism (d. 1282)
- August 4 – Richard de Clare, 6th Earl of Gloucester, English soldier (d. 1262)
- Queen Jeongsun (Wonjong) of Korea (d. 1237)

1223

- January 25 – Maud de Lacy, English noblewoman (d. 1289)
- Baibars, Mamluk sultan of Egypt and Syria (d. 1277)
- Eleanor of Provence, queen of England (d. 1291)
- Frederick of Castile, Spanish nobleman (d. 1277)
- Guido I da Montefeltro, Italian nobleman (d. 1298)
- Hugh le Despencer, English nobleman (d. 1265)
- Ibn Abd al-Zahir, Egyptian historian (d. 1293)
- Ichijō Sanetsune, Japanese nobleman (d. 1284)
- John Fitzalan II, English nobleman (d. 1267)
- Llywelyn ap Gruffudd, prince of Wales (d. 1282)
- Michael VIII (Palaiologos), Byzantine emperor (d. 1282)
- Mugai Nyodai, Japanese Zen Master (d. 1298)
- Stefan Uroš I (the Great), king of Serbia (d. 1277)

1224

- March 5 – Kinga of Poland, high duchess of Poland (d. 1292)
- March 20 – Sophie of Thuringia, duchess of Brabant (d. 1275)
- June 14 – Matilda of Brabant, countess of Artois (d. 1288)
- Alice de Lusignan, countess of Surrey (d. 1256)
- Elena of Bulgaria, empress of Nicaea (d. 1258)
- Herman I, German nobleman and knight (d. 1290)
- Hōjō Tsunetoki, Japanese regent (shikken; d. 1246)
- Isabelle of France, French princess and nun (d. 1270)
- Jean de Joinville, French historian and writer (d. 1317)
- Kanezawa Sanetoki, Japanese nobleman (d. 1276)
- Margery de Burgh, Norman noblewoman (d. 1252)
- Maud de Braose, English noblewoman (d. 1301)
- Pribislaw I, German nobleman and knight (d. 1275)
- Teruko, Japanese princess and empress (d. 1262)
- Theobald Butler, Norman chief governor (d. 1248)
- William II, French nobleman and knight (d. 1251)

1225

- Amato Ronconi, Italian nobleman and monk (d. 1292)
- Beatrice of Bohemia, German noblewoman (d. 1290)
- Beatrice of Brabant, countess of Flanders (d. 1288)
- Chabi, Mongol empress and wife of Kublai Khan (d. 1281)
- David VI Narin (the Clever), king of Georgia (d. 1293)
- Franciscus Accursius, Italian lawyer and jurist (d. 1293)
- Fujiwara no Kitsushi, Japanese empress (d. 1292)
- Gaston VII (Froissard), viscount of Béarn (d. 1290)
- Guido Guinizelli, Italian poet and writer (d. 1276)
- Guigues VII, ruler (dauphin) of Viennois (d. 1269)
- Saionji Kisshi, Japanese empress consort (d. 1292)
- Sanchia of Provence, queen of Germany (d. 1261)
- Thomas Aquinas, Italian friar and theologian (d. 1274)
- Todros ben Joseph Abulafia, Spanish rabbi (d. 1285)
- Walter Giffard, English Lord Chancellor (d. 1279)

1226

- April 16 – Mugaku Sogen, Chinese monk and adviser (d. 1286)
- June 21 – Bolesław V the Chaste, Polish nobleman (d. 1279)
- November 2 – Isabella de Clare, English noblewoman (d. 1264)
- Amato Ronconi, Italian nobleman, monk and hermit (d. 1292)
- Angelo da Foligno (or Conti), Italian cleric and priest (d. 1312)
- Ata-Malik Juvayni, Persian governor and historian (d. 1283)
- Bai Renfu (or Bai Pu), Chinese poet and playwright (d. 1306)
- Bar Hebraeus, Syrian scholar, historian and bishop (d. 1286)
- Blanche of Navarre (or Champagne), duchess of Brittany (d. 1283)
- Charles I, French nobleman and son of Louis VIII (d. 1285)
- Dietrich VI, German nobleman and knight (d. 1275)
- Gertrude of Austria, Austrian noblewoman (d. 1288)
- Herman VI, Margrave of Baden, German nobleman and knight (d. 1250)
- Maria of Brabant, Duchess of Bavaria, German noblewoman (d. 1256)
- Ulrich I, Count of Württemberg ("the Founder"), German nobleman (d. 1265)

1227

- January 1 – Mujū Dōkyō, Japanese Buddhist monk (d. 1312)
- June 29 – Hōjō Tokiyori, Japanese regent (shikken) (d. 1263)
- September 30 – Nicholas IV, pope of the Catholic Church (d. 1292)
- Aju (or Achu), Mongol military leader and chancellor (d. 1287)
- Chomden Rigpe Raldri, Tibetan scholar and writer (d. 1305)
- Elisabeth of Bavaria, queen consort of Germany (d. 1273)
- Fang Hui (or Xugu), Chinese scholar and politician (d. 1307)
- Gertrude of Aldenberg, German noblewoman (d. 1297)
- Hōjō Nagatoki, Japanese samurai and regent (d. 1264)
- Hu Zhiyu, Chinese Sanqu poet and writer (d. 1293)
- William II of Holland, anti-king of Germany (d. 1256)

1228

- April 25 – Conrad IV (or Conrad II), king of Germany (d. 1254)
- Alfonso of Brienne, Norman nobleman and knight (d. 1270)
- Bartolo da San Gimignano, Italian Franciscan priest (d. 1300)
- Eleanor de Braose, Cambro-Norman noblewoman (d. 1251)
- Ibn Daqiq al-'Id, Egyptian scholar, jurist and writer (d. 1302)
- Shihab al-Din al-Qarafi, Egyptian scholar and jurist (d. 1285)
- Takatsukasa Kanehira, Japanese nobleman (kugyō) (d. 1294)
- Wang Yun, Chinese politician, poet and writer (d. 1304)

1229

- April 13 – Louis II (the Strict), German nobleman (d. 1294)
- Al-Ashraf Musa, Ayyubid prince (emir) and ruler (d. 1263)
- Beatrice of Provence, queen consort of Sicily (d. 1267)
- Kujō Tadaie, Japanese nobleman and regent (d. 1275)
- Oberto D'Oria, Italian nobleman and admiral (d. 1306)

== Deaths ==
1220

- January 23 – Bogislaw II, duke of Pomerania (b. 1177)
- February 17 – Theobald I, German nobleman (b. 1191)
- February 25 – Albert II, margrave of Brandenburg (b. 1177)
- March 11 – Isabel de Clare, English noblewoman (b. 1172)
- April 15 – Adolf of Altena, archbishop of Cologne (b. 1157)
- May 5 – Angelus of Jerusalem, Jerusalemite priest (b.1185)
- May 8 – Rikissa of Denmark, queen of Sweden (b. 1180)
- June 1 – Henry de Bohun, 1st Earl of Hereford (b. 1176)
- August 8 – Karl the Deaf, Swedish nobleman
- November 2 – Radulf II, Scottish monk and abbot
- November 3
  - Adelaide II, German noblewoman and abbess
  - Urraca of Castile, queen of Portugal (b. 1186)
- Agnes of France (or Anna), Byzantine empress (b. 1171)
- Alys of France (or Alice), daughter of Louis VII (b. 1160)
- Attar of Nishapur, Persian poet and theoretician (b. 1145)
- Hugues IV de Berzé, French knight and poet (b. 1155)
- Ibn al-Tuwayr, Egyptian official and historian (b. 1130)
- Jean de Gisors, Norman nobleman and knight (b. 1133)
- Michael Choniates, Byzantine cleric and writer (b. 1140)
- Muhammad II, Khwarezmid viceroy and ruler (b. 1169)
- Philip of Oldcoates, English nobleman and official
- Ralph of Saint Omer (or Tiberias), prince of Galilee
- Robert de Berkeley, English nobleman and knight
- Robert of Burgate, English landowner and knight
- Stephanie of Armenia (or Rita), Armenian princess
- Veera Ballala II, Indian ruler of the Hoysala Empire
- Zhao Xun, Chinese prince and calligrapher (b. 1192)

1221

- January 17 – Walter de Clifford, English nobleman (b. 1160)
- February 18 – Theodoric I, Margrave of Meissen (b. 1162)
- March 26 – Raoul de Neuville, French bishop and diplomat
- March 27 – Berengaria of Portugal, queen consort of Denmark (b. 1198)
- April 25 – Baruch ben Samuel of Mainz, German rabbi
- Spring – Mutukan commander of Mongol Empire
- July 7 – Peter of Cornwall, English priest and writer (b. 1140)
- August 6 – Dominic, founder of the Dominican Order, canonized (b. 1170)
- September 15 – Geoffrey of Rohan, French nobleman (b. 1190)
- October 4 – William IV of Ponthieu (Talvas), Norman nobleman (b. 1179)
- October 21 – Alix, Duchess of Brittany (or Alis), Breton noblewoman (b. 1200)
- October 31 – Ulrich II, Bishop of Passau, German abbot and prince-bishop
- November – Theodore I Laskaris, emperor of Nicaea (b. 1175)
- December – Roger of San Severino, archbishop of Benevento
- Adam of Perseigne, French Cistercian abbot (b. 1145)
- Albertet de Sestaro, French jongleur and troubadour
- Asukai Masatsune, Japanese waka poet and writer
- Lalibela (Gebre Meskel), ruler of the Ethiopian Empire (b. 1162)
- Hassan III of Alamut, ruler of the Nizari Ismaili State (b. 1187)
- Henry I of Rodez, French nobleman and troubadour
- John of Tynemouth, English priest, archdeacon and lawyer
- Najmuddin Kubra, Khwarezmian philosopher (b. 1145)
- Roger Bigod, 2nd Earl of Norfolk, English nobleman and knight (b. 1144)
- Walter de Lindsay of Lamberton, Scottish nobleman and knight

1222

- February 1 – Alexios Megas Komnenos, first Emperor of Trebizond
- March 10 – Johan Sverkersson, king of Sweden since 1216 (b. 1201)
- June 23 – Constance of Aragon, Holy Roman Empress, queen consort of Hungary (b. 1179)
- August 2 – Raymond VI, Count of Toulouse (b. 1156)
- August 12 – Vladislaus III, Duke of Bohemia
- Theodore I Lascaris, founder of the Byzantine Empire of Nicaea

1223

- March 8 – Wincenty Kadłubek, bishop of Kraków (b. 1150)
- March 25 – Afonso II (the Fat), king of Portugal (b. 1185)
- May 31 – Mstislav Svyatoslavich, Kievan prince (b. 1168)
- June 4 – Hugh of Beaulieu, English abbot and bishop
- July 7 – Ibn Qudamah, Umayyad theologian (b. 1147)
- July 8 – Konoe Motomichi, Japanese nobleman (b. 1160)
- July 14 – Philip II (Augustus), king of France (b. 1165)
- Alamanda de Castelnau, French troubadour and writer
- Fernán Gutiérrez de Castro, Spanish nobleman (b. 1180)
- Gerald of Wales, Norman archdeacon and writer (b. 1146)
- Gille Brigte of Strathearn, Scottish nobleman (b. 1150)
- Henry I (the Elder), German nobleman and knight (b. 1158)
- Ibn Tumlus, Andalusian scholar and physician (b. 1164)
- Jebe (the Arrow), Mongol general (approximate date)
- Mstislav Romanovich (the Old), Grand Prince of Kiev
- Muqali (or Mukhulai), Mongol military leader (b. 1170)
- Sancho (or Sanche), Aragonese nobleman (b. 1161)
- Unkei, Japanese Buddhist monk and sculptor (b. 1150)
- William de Cornhill, English archdeacon and bishop
- Ye Shi, Chinese philosopher and politician (b. 1150)

1224

- January 14 – Xuan Zong, Chinese emperor (b. 1163)
- March 24 – Conrad III, German cleric and bishop (b. 1165)
- March 27 – William of Sainte-Mère-Église, Norman bishop
- April 14 – Matilda of Dendermonde, Flemish noblewoman
- April 30 – Bernard II, German nobleman and knight (b. 1140)
- July 1 – Hōjō Yoshitoki, Japanese regent (shikken; b. 1163)
- July 24 – Christina the Astonishing, Flemish saint (b. 1150)
- August 15 – Marie of France, duchess of Brabant (b. 1198)
- September 17 – Ning Zong, Chinese emperor (b. 1168)
- Abu Muhammad al-Wahid, ruler of the Almohad Caliphate
- Cathal Crobdearg Ua Conchobair, king of Connacht (b. 1153)
- Durand of Huesca, Spanish monk and theologian (b. 1160)
- Judah ben Isaac Messer, French Jewish rabbi (b. 1166)
- Liu Songnian, Chinese landscape painter (b. 1174)
- Máel Muire Ó Connaig, Irish bishop of Kilmacduagh
- Raoul of Mérencourt, Latin patriarch of Jerusalem
- Simon Rochfort (or de Rupeforti), English bishop
- Thomas I, Hungarian chancellor and archbishop
- William d'Aubigny, English nobleman and knight
- William de Mowbray, English nobleman and knight
- Xia Gui, Chinese landscape painter
- Yusuf II al-Mustansir, ruler of the Almohad Caliphate

1225

- January 3 – Adolf III of Holstein, German nobleman (b. 1160)
- February 18 – Hugh Bigod, English nobleman (b. 1182)
- March 30 – Gertrude of Dagsburg, French noblewoman
- May 6 – John of Fountains, English prelate and bishop
- June 8 – Sabrisho IV, patriarch of the Church of the East
- June 21 – Conrad of Krosigk, German prelate and bishop
- July 16 – Ōe no Hiromoto, Japanese nobleman (b. 1148)
- August 16 – Hōjō Masako, Japanese noblewoman (b. 1156)
- August 24 – Adelardo Cattaneo, Italian cardinal and bishop
- September 16 – Rainier of Antioch, Latin cleric and patriarch
- September 17 – William VI, marquis of Montferrat (b. 1173)
- September 29 – Arnaud Amalric, French abbot and bishop
- October 5 – Al-Nasir, caliph of the Abbasid Caliphate (b. 1158)
- October 28 – Jien, Japanese poet and historian (b. 1155)
- November 7 – Engelbert II of Berg, archbishop of Cologne
- Ahmad al-Buni, Almohad mathematician and Sufi writer
- Al-Afdal ibn Salah ad-Din, ruler of Damascus (b. 1169)
- Bernard Itier, French librarian and chronicler (b. 1163)
- Eliezer ben Joel HaLevi, German rabbi and writer (b. 1140)
- Geoffrey de Neville, English nobleman and seneschal
- Ghabdula Chelbir (or Chelbir), ruler of Volga Bulgaria
- Ivane of Akhaltsikhe, Georgian nobleman and courtier
- Lamberto Visconti di Eldizio, Sardinian ruler of Gallura
- Margaret of Louvain, Flemish servant and saint (b. 1207)
- Muzaffar al-Din Uzbek, ruler (atabeg) of the Eldiguzids
- Urso of Calabria, Italian scholar, philosopher and writer
- William the Breton, French chronicler (approximate date)
- Zhao Hong, Chinese prince and heir apparent (b. 1207)

1226

- March 7 – William Longespée, English nobleman and knight (b. 1176)
- May 2 – Amaury I de Craon, French nobleman and knight (b. 1170)
- May 10 – Beatrice d'Este, Italian Benedictine nun and saint (b. 1192)
- June 5 – Henry Borwin II, Lord of Mecklenburg (or Burwy), German nobleman (b. 1170)
- July 2 – Waleran III (or Walram), duke of Limburg (b. 1165)
- July 11 – Al-Zahir bi-Amr Allah, caliph of the Abbasid Caliphate (b. 1175)
- August 8 – Guy II, Count of Saint-Pol, French nobleman and knight
- September 9 – Rudolf von Güttingen, Swiss abbot and bishop
- September 16 – Pandulf Verraccio, Italian bishop and politician
- October 3 – Francis of Assisi, founder of the Franciscan Order
- October 7 – Louis IV, Count of Chiny ("the Young"), French nobleman (b. 1173)
- October 22 – Renaud de Forez, French archbishop
- November 8 – Louis VIII ("the Lion"), king of France (b. 1187)
- November 15 – Frederick of Isenberg, German nobleman
- December 18 – Benedict of Sausetun, bishop of Rochester
- Aed mac Donn Ó Sochlachain, Irish musician and writer
- Bernart Arnaut d'Armagnac (or Arnaud), French troubadour
- Eleanor of Aragon, Spanish princess and countess (b. 1182)
- Falkes de Bréauté, Norman nobleman and High Sheriff
- Joseph ben Judah of Ceuta, Spanish physician and poet
- Roger de Montbegon, English nobleman and landowner
- Shenzong, Chinese emperor of Western Xia (b. 1163)
- William Brewer, English nobleman and High Sheriff
- Xian Zong, Chinese emperor of Western Xia (b. 1181)

1227

- January 28 – Henry Borwin I, German nobleman and knight
- March 18 – Honorius III, pope of the Catholic Church (b. 1150)
- April 28 – Henry V (the Elder), German nobleman (b. 1173)
- July 23 – Qiu Chuji, Chinese Taoist religious leader (b. 1148)
- July 28 – Otto II of Lippe (or Utrecht), Dutch prince-bishop
- August 1 – Shimazu Tadahisa, Japanese warlord (b. 1179)
- August 25 – Genghis Khan, founder of the Mongol Empire
- September 11
  - Louis IV (the Saint), landgrave of Thuringia (b. 1200)
  - Oliver of Paderborn, German bishop and chronicler
- September 13 – Guillaume II, French nobleman and knight
- September 29 – Conrad of Urach, German cardinal-bishop
- October 4 – Abdallah al-Adil, Almohad governor and caliph
- October 10 – Daniel and companions, Franciscan martyrs
- November 12 – Al-Mu'azzam Isa, Ayyubid ruler (b. 1176)
- November 24 – Leszek I (the White), High Duke of Poland
- Abd al-Salam ibn Mashish al-Alami, Moroccan Sufi writer
- Guala Bicchieri, Italian cardinal and papal legate (b. 1150)
- Luke Netterville, Norman archdeacon and archbishop
- Minamoto no Michitomo, Japanese nobleman (b. 1171)
- Mo (or Li Xian), Chinese emperor of Western Xia
- Philip of Ibelin, Cypriot nobleman and regent (b. 1180)
- Renaud I (or Reginald), French nobleman (b. 1165)
- Shalva of Akhaltsikhe, Georgian general and courtier

1228

- January 13 – Yvette of Huy, Belgian anchoress (b. 1158)
- January 31 – Guy de Montfort, French nobleman and knight
- February 17 – Henry I, German nobleman and knight (b. 1155)
- February 18 – Vladislaus II, margrave of Moravia (b. 1207)
- April 25 – Isabella II, queen and regent of Jerusalem (b. 1212)
- June 18 – Mathilde of Bourbon, French noblewoman (b. 1165)
- July 9 – Stephen Langton, archbishop of Canterbury (b. 1150)
- August 8 – Rujing, Japanese Sōtō Zen patriarch (b. 1163)
- September 24 – Stefan the First-Crowned, king of Serbia
- October 15 – Shichijō-in, Japanese noblewoman (b. 1157)
- October 31 – Eustace of Fauconberg, bishop of London
- December 4 – Bruno von Porstendorf, bishop of Meissen
- December 8 – Geoffrey de Burgh, bishop of Ely (b. 1180)
- Ahmad ibn Munim, Moroccan mathematician and writer
- Anders Sunesen, Danish archbishop and writer (b. 1167)
- Beatrice of Albon, duchess consort of Burgundy (b. 1161)
- Desiderius (Dezső), Hungarian bishop of Csanád and chancellor
- Geoffrey I of Villehardouin, French nobleman and knight
- Guérin de Montaigu, French nobleman and Grand Master
- Henry de Loundres, Norman churchman and archbishop
- Ibn Abi Tayyi, Syrian historian, poet and writer (b. 1180)
- Lady of Neuville ("Eudoxie"), Latin empress consort
- Máel Coluim I, Scottish nobleman and knight (b. 1204)
- Maria of Courtenay, empress consort of the Empire of Nicaea and empress regent of Constantinople
- Reginald de Braose, Norman Marcher Lord (b. 1182)
- Robert I (Courtenay), Latin Emperor of Constantinople
- Robert de Vieuxpont (or Vipont), Anglo-Norman landowner
- Stephen Devereux, Norman Marcher Lord (b. 1191)
- Zhang Congzheng, Chinese physician (b. 1156)

1229

- January 17 – Albert of Buxhoeven, bishop of Riga (b. 1165)
- February 8 – Ali ibn Hanzala, Arab imam and theologian
- February 14 – Rǫgnvaldr Guðrøðarson, ruler of the Isles
- March 13 – Blanche of Navarre, countess and regent of Champagne
- June 24 – Walter III (or de Brisebarre), lord of Caesarea
- August 21 – Iwo Odrowąż, Polish bishop and statesman
- September – Guillem II de Montcada, Spanish nobleman and knight
- October 10 – Henry de Beaumont, English nobleman
- October 22 – Gerard III, Dutch nobleman and knight
- October 26 – Fulk of Pavia, Italian prelate and bishop
- November 14 – Martin of Pattishall, English chief justice
- December 25 – Herman II of Lippe, German nobleman and knight (b. 1175)
- unknown date – Yaqut al-Hamawi, Arab geographer and writer (b. 1179)
