= 1225 =

1225 in various calendars
- Gregorian calendar: 1225; MCCXXV
- Ab urbe condita: 1978
- Armenian calendar: 674; ԹՎ ՈՀԴ
- Assyrian calendar: 5975
- Balinese saka calendar: 1146–1147
- Bengali calendar: 631–632
- Berber calendar: 2175
- English Regnal year: 9 Hen. 3 – 10 Hen. 3
- Buddhist calendar: 1769
- Burmese calendar: 587
- Byzantine calendar: 6733–6734
- Chinese calendar: 甲申年 (Wood Monkey); 3922 or 3715 — to — 乙酉年 (Wood Rooster); 3923 or 3716
- Coptic calendar: 941–942
- Discordian calendar: 2391
- Ethiopian calendar: 1217–1218
- Hebrew calendar: 4985–4986
- Hindu calendars
- Vikram Samvat: 1281–1282
- Shaka Samvat: 1146–1147
- Kali Yuga: 4325–4326
- Holocene calendar: 11225
- Igbo calendar: 225–226
- Iranian calendar: 603–604
- Islamic calendar: 621–622
- Japanese calendar: Gennin 2 / Karoku 1 (嘉禄元年)
- Javanese calendar: 1133–1134
- Julian calendar: 1225; MCCXXV
- Korean calendar: 3558
- Minguo calendar: 687 before ROC 民前687年
- Nanakshahi calendar: −243
- Thai solar calendar: 1767–1768
- Tibetan calendar: ཤིང་ཕོ་སྤྲེ་ལོ་ (male Wood-Monkey); 1351 or 970 or 198 — to — ཤིང་མོ་བྱ་ལོ་ (female Wood-Bird); 1352 or 971 or 199

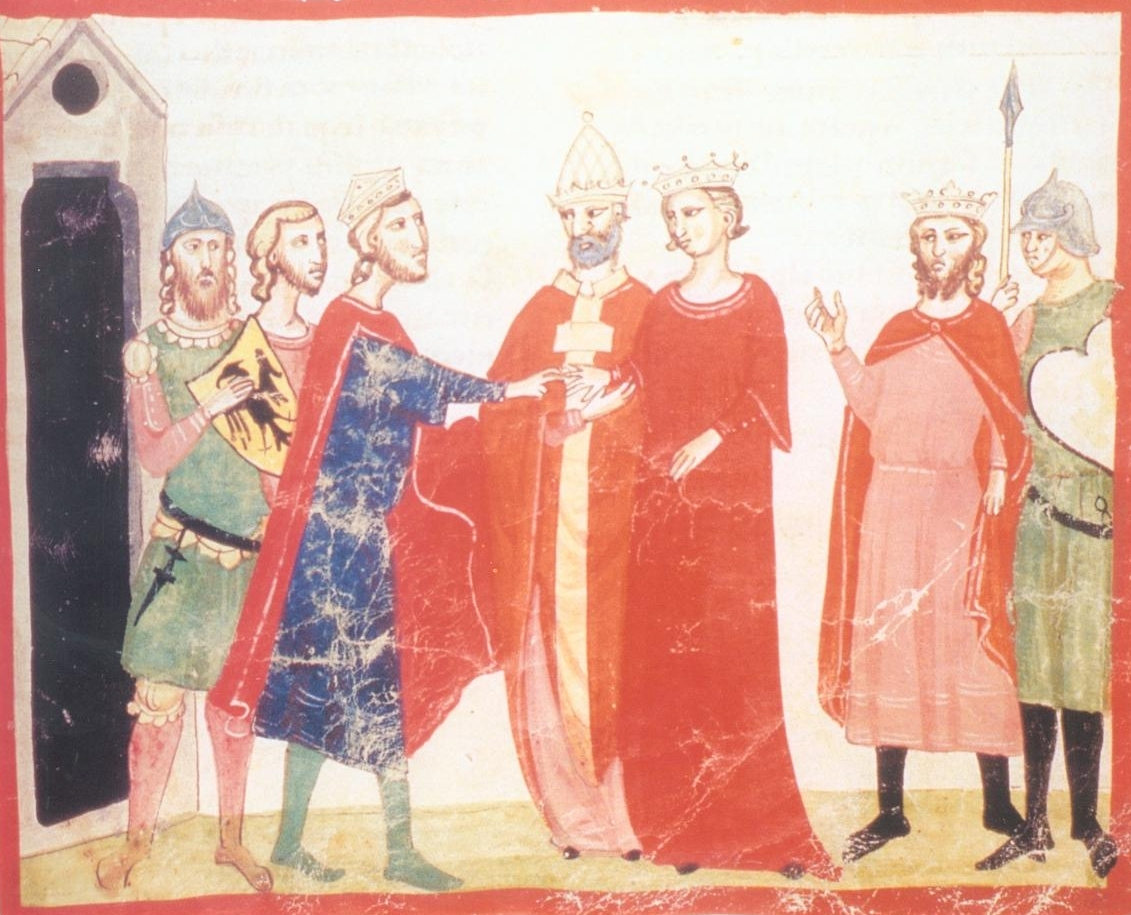
November 9: Frederick II marries Queen Isabella II of Jerusalem

Year 1225 (MCCXXV) was a common year starting on Wednesday of the Julian calendar.

== Events ==
=== January – March ===
- January 11 – Albrecht of Orlamünde, Denmark's governor of Nordalbingia, meets with numerous nobles in Segeberg and marches with his cousin Otto of Lüneburg against Henry I, Count of Schwerin, the ally of Adolf, Count of Schauerburg. Days later, Albrecht and Henry fight the Battle of Mölln in what is now the German state of Schleswig-Holstein, where Albrecht is taken as a prisoner of war.
- February 11 –
  - The Charter of the Forest is restored to its traditional rights by King Henry III. 'Free men' are allowed to find pasture for their pigs, collect firewood, graze animals, or cut turf for fuel. At this time, however, only about 10 percent of the population is 'free', the rest are locked into service to a local landowner, some of them little more than slaves.
  - The Magna Carta is reaffirmed (for the third time) by Henry III, in return for issuing a property tax. It becomes the definitive version of the text.
- March 3 – As the envoy of Pope Honorius III, Romanus, Cardinal-deacon of San Angelo, leaves Rome to travel to France to the court of King Louis XIII.
- March 23 – Prince Richard of Cornwall, brother of King Henry III of England, and his uncle William Longsword, Earl of Salisbury, depart England on with 77 warriors on an expedition to fight in Aquitaine in France, and soon land at Bordeaux, then on to capture La Rochelle. As the expedition progresses, Richard's expedition captures La Réole and Bergerac by November.

=== April – June ===
- April 15 – Pope Honorius III issues the papal bull Magistro Andree canonico Palentino, granting the Andree, a former Jew who converted to Christianity, the title of canon of Palencia, with full eccleastical dignities.
- May 10 – Gerold of Lausanne, French bishop of Valence, becomes the new Latin patriarch of Jerusalem (until 1239).
- May 15 – Pope Honorius exhorts Hungarian Catholics to launch the Bosnian Crusade against the autonomous Bosnian Church Christians.
- May 25 – At his royal palace in Bergen, King Haakon IV of Norway marries Margaret Skulesdatter, daughter of Haakon's rival for the throne, Skule Bårdsson.
- May 30 – King Louis VIII of France meets in Péronne with a hermit who claims to be Baldwin IX, Count of Flanders and the Latin Emperor of Constantinople, who had not been seen in public since being taken a prisoner in Bulgaria. Concluding that the hermit is an impostor, King Louis gives the man three days to leave France, and the "false Baldwin" instead leads a rebellion, eventually losing and being executed.
- June 10 – Pope Honorius III issues the bull Vineae Domini custodes in which he approves the mission of two friars to Morocco. The bull is reissued in October when Honorius III exhorts the Dominican and Franciscan order to participate in that mission.

=== July – September ===
- July 25 –
  - Jalal al-Din Mangburni dethrones Muzaffar al-Din Uzbek, ruler (atabeg) of the Eldiguzids, and sets himself up in the capital of Tabriz (modern Iran).
  - Emperor Frederick II takes an oath at San Germano (near Cassino) and promises to depart on a Crusade (the Sixth Crusade), for the Near East in August 1227. He sends 1000 knights to the Levant and provides Rome with 100,000 ounces of gold, to be forfeited to the Catholic Church should he break his vow. These funds will be returned to Frederick once he arrives at Acre.
- July 25 – The Agreement of San Germano is signed between the Holy Roman Emperor Frederick II and Pope Honorius III, with the Emperor Frederick agreeing to lead the Sixth Crusade to recapture Jerusalem and the rest of the Christian Holy Land in the Middle East from the Muslims. In return for the financing and the provision of soldiers by the Catholis Church in Syria, Frederick agrees to launch the Crusade on or before August 15, 1227.
- July 27 – Visby Cathedral in Sweden is consecrated.
- August 19 – Rolando Rossi di Parma becomes the new leader of the Republic of Pisa, which had been governed by an official from the Duchy of Milan since September of 1224.
- September 11 – The Republic of Massa is founded in Central Italy with Bernardino del fu Losco as its first podesta appointed by the council of nine lords to serve as executive of the independent state.

=== October – December ===
- October 5 – Caliph Al-Nasir dies from dysentery at Baghdad after a 45-year reign. He is succeeded by his son Al-Zahir as ruler of the Abbasid Caliphate.
- November 9 – Frederick II marries the 14-year-old Queen Yolande, heiress to the kingdom of Jerusalem, and adds the Crusader States to his dominions.
- November 17 – After being taken prisoner of war at the Battle of Mölln in January, the Danish governor Albrecht signs the Peace of Bardowick in order to obtain his freedom, ceding Holstein to Adolf of Schauenberg, in addition to releasing King Valdemar II of Denmark and his son Valdemar the Younger, who both had been kidnapped in 1223 and held as prisoners.
- November 29 – The 12-year-old Henry VII, by order of his father Frederick II, marries Margaret of Austria, daughter of Duke Leopold VI the Glorious.
- December 31 – Lý Chiêu Hoàng, the only empress regnant in the history of Vietnam, marries Trần Thái Tông, making him the first ruler of the Trần dynasty.

=== By place ===
==== Mongol Empire ====
- Autumn – Subutai is assigned a new campaign by Genghis Khan against the Tanguts. He crosses the Gobi Desert with a Mongol army and advances south into the Western Xia (or Xi Xia). Meanwhile, Genghis, in his mid-sixties, becomes wounded during hunting. His injury – a dislocated shoulder, perhaps, or a bruised rib – forces him to take some rest.
- Iltutmish, Ghurid ruler of the Delhi Sultanate, repels a Mongol attack and invades Bengal. His rival, Ghiyasuddin, leads an army to halt Iltutmish's advance, but decides to avoid a conflict by paying him tribute and accepting his suzerainty.

==== Europe ====
- The Teutonic Knights are expelled from Transylvania by King Andrew II, because they wanted to separate from Hungary.

==== Middle East ====
- Summer – Battle of Garni: Khwarezmid forces led by Jalal al-Din Mangburni defeat the Georgian army (some 70,000 men) at Garni. The royal court of Queen Rusudan moves to Kutaisi, while the Georgian capital Tbilisi is besieged by the Khwarezmians.

==== Levant ====
- The 8-year-old Henry I (the Fat) is crowned as king of Cyprus in the Cathedral of Saint Sophia at Nicosia. His uncle Philip of Ibelin orders the coronation, so that when Henry comes of age at fifteen a regency could not be prolonged on the ground that he is not yet crowned.

== Births ==
- Amato Ronconi, Italian nobleman and monk (d. 1292)
- Beatrice of Bohemia, German noblewoman (d. 1290)
- Beatrice of Brabant, countess of Flanders (d. 1288)
- Chabi, Mongol empress and wife of Kublai Khan (d. 1281)
- David VI Narin (the Clever), king of Georgia (d. 1293)
- Franciscus Accursius, Italian lawyer and jurist (d. 1293)
- Fujiwara no Kitsushi, Japanese empress (d. 1292)
- Gaston VII (Froissard), viscount of Béarn (d. 1290)
- Guido Guinizelli, Italian poet and writer (d. 1276)
- Guigues VII, ruler (dauphin) of Viennois (d. 1269)
- Saionji Kisshi, Japanese empress consort (d. 1292)
- Sanchia of Provence, queen of Germany (d. 1261)
- Thomas Aquinas, Italian friar and theologian (d. 1274)
- Todros ben Joseph Abulafia, Spanish rabbi (d. 1285)
- Walter Giffard, English Lord Chancellor (d. 1279)

== Deaths ==
- January 3 – Adolf III of Holstein, German nobleman (b. 1160)
- February 18 – Hugh Bigod, English nobleman (b. 1182)
- March 30 – Gertrude of Dagsburg, French noblewoman
- May 6 – John of Fountains, English prelate and bishop
- June 8 – Sabrisho IV, patriarch of the Church of the East
- June 21 – Conrad of Krosigk, German prelate and bishop
- July 16 – Ōe no Hiromoto, Japanese nobleman (b. 1148)
- August 16 – Hōjō Masako, Japanese noblewoman (b. 1156)
- August 24 – Adelardo Cattaneo, Italian cardinal and bishop
- September 16 – Rainier of Antioch, Latin cleric and patriarch
- September 17 – William VI, marquis of Montferrat (b. 1173)
- September 29 – Arnaud Amalric, French abbot and bishop
- October 5 – Al-Nasir, caliph of the Abbasid Caliphate (b. 1158)
- October 28 – Jien, Japanese poet and historian (b. 1155)
- November 7 – Engelbert II of Berg, archbishop of Cologne
- Ahmad al-Buni, Almohad mathematician and Sufi writer
- Al-Afdal ibn Salah ad-Din, ruler of Damascus (b. 1169)
- Bernard Itier, French librarian and chronicler (b. 1163)
- Eliezer ben Joel HaLevi, German rabbi and writer (b. 1140)
- Geoffrey de Neville, English nobleman and seneschal
- Ghabdula Chelbir (or Chelbir), ruler of Volga Bulgaria
- Ivane of Akhaltsikhe, Georgian nobleman and courtier
- Lamberto Visconti di Eldizio, Sardinian ruler of Gallura
- Margaret of Louvain, Flemish servant and saint (b. 1207)
- Muzaffar al-Din Uzbek, ruler (atabeg) of the Eldiguzids
- Urso of Calabria, Italian scholar, philosopher and writer
- William the Breton, French chronicler (approximate date)
- Zhao Hong, Chinese prince and heir apparent (b. 1207)
