= Uyukpa Rigpai Sengge =

Sakya scholar

Uyukpa Rigpai Sengge (Tibetan: 'U yug pa rigs pa'i seng ge) in the 13th century was a Tibetan monk. He was disciple of Sakya Pandita Kunga Gyeltsen (1182–1251, the fourth of the Five Sakya Forefathers (sa skya gong ma lnga), and is regarded as the foremost disciple of him in the field of epistemology (pramāṇa, tshad ma).

His collected works (gsung ’bum) were recently published in the Tibetan book series mes po'i shul bzhag (Chinese: Xianzhe yishu 先哲遗书) in 3 volumes.

His Commentaries on Treasury of Valid Cognition (tshad ma rigs gter) are regarded as one of "the classics of Sakya School”.

In the Sakya tradition it was said that Tawen Lodro Gyaltsen, the Fifteenth Sakya Trizin (c. 1332 – c. 1364), was an expert in Dharmakīrti’s Pramāṇavārttika, his mastery surpassed only by Sakya Pandita Kunga Gyeltsen and Uyukpa Rigpai Sengge.

== See also ==
- Paltsek Research Institute

== Bibliography ==
- Leonard van der Kuijp: “Studies in Btsun pa Ston gzhon's Pramāṇavārttika Commentary of 1297. Part Two(a): 'U yug pa Rigs pa'i seng ge (ca. 1195–after 1267)”, Revue d’Etudes Tibétaines, no.64, Juillet 2022, pp. 307-343. – Online
- Allison Aitken: “Chomden Reldri on Dharmakīrti's Examination of Relations.”. In: Kurtis Schaeffer, Jue Liang & McGrath William (eds.): Histories of Tibet: Essays in Honor of Leonard W. J. van der Kuijp. Studies in Indian and Tibetan Buddhism. pp. 283–305 (2023)
