= 1285 =

1285 in various calendars
- Gregorian calendar: 1285; MCCLXXXV
- Ab urbe condita: 2038
- Armenian calendar: 734; ԹՎ ՉԼԴ
- Assyrian calendar: 6035
- Balinese saka calendar: 1206–1207
- Bengali calendar: 691–692
- Berber calendar: 2235
- English Regnal year: 13 Edw. 1 – 14 Edw. 1
- Buddhist calendar: 1829
- Burmese calendar: 647
- Byzantine calendar: 6793–6794
- Chinese calendar: 甲申年 (Wood Monkey); 3982 or 3775 — to — 乙酉年 (Wood Rooster); 3983 or 3776
- Coptic calendar: 1001–1002
- Discordian calendar: 2451
- Ethiopian calendar: 1277–1278
- Hebrew calendar: 5045–5046
- Hindu calendars
- Vikram Samvat: 1341–1342
- Shaka Samvat: 1206–1207
- Kali Yuga: 4385–4386
- Holocene calendar: 11285
- Igbo calendar: 285–286
- Iranian calendar: 663–664
- Islamic calendar: 683–684
- Japanese calendar: Kōan 8 (弘安８年)
- Javanese calendar: 1195–1196
- Julian calendar: 1285; MCCLXXXV
- Korean calendar: 3618
- Minguo calendar: 627 before ROC 民前627年
- Nanakshahi calendar: −183
- Thai solar calendar: 1827–1828
- Tibetan calendar: ཤིང་ཕོ་སྤྲེ་ལོ་ (male Wood-Monkey); 1411 or 1030 or 258 — to — ཤིང་མོ་བྱ་ལོ་ (female Wood-Bird); 1412 or 1031 or 259

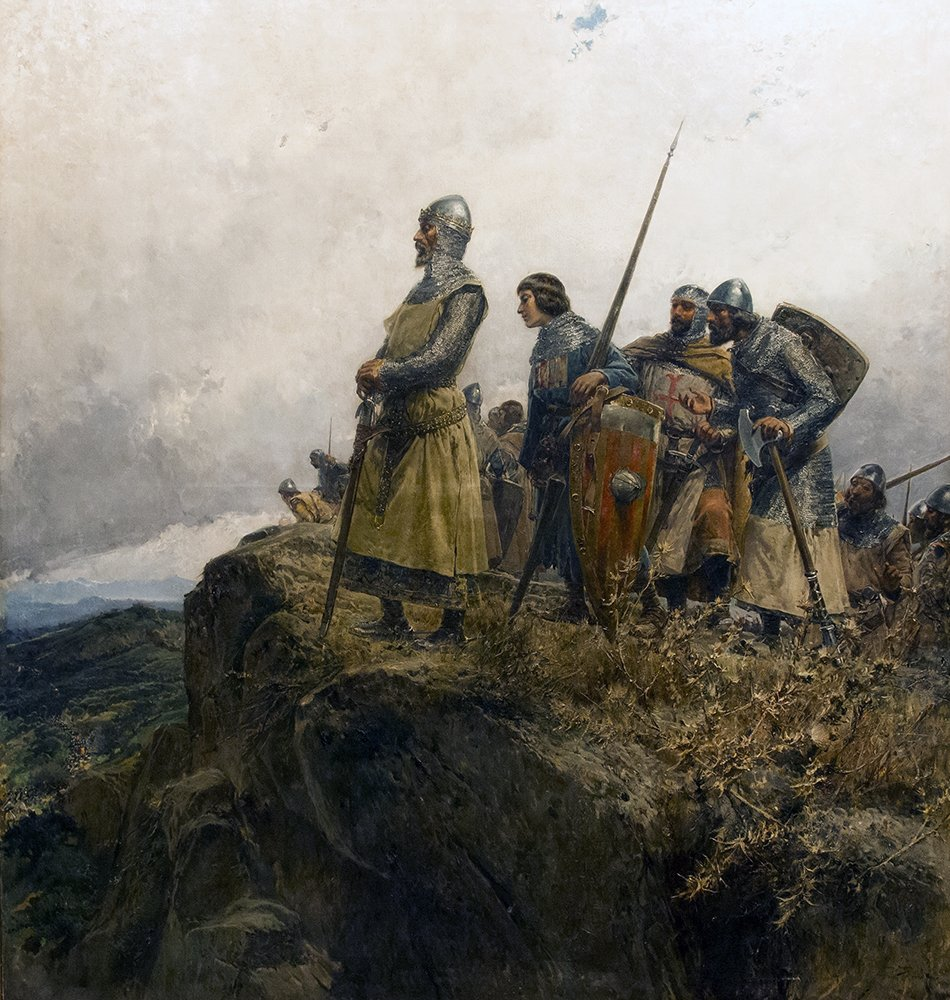
Peter III overlooking the Panissar Pass

Year 1285 (MCCLXXXV) was a common year starting on Monday of the Julian calendar.

== Events ==
=== By place ===
==== Europe ====
- Aragonese Crusade: French forces led by King Philip III (the Bold) entrench before Girona, in an attempt to besiege the city. Despite strong resistance, the city is eventually taken on September 7. Philip's son, the 15-year-old Charles of Valois, is crowned as king of Aragon (under the vassalage of the Holy See) but without an actual crown. Shortly after, the French camp is racked by an epidemic of dysentery and Philip is forced to retreat.
- April – Marinid forces under Sultan Abu Yusuf Yaqub ibn Abd al-Haqq cross the straits from Alcácer Seguir to Tarifa. From there they advance to Jerez de la Frontera, where they besiege the city. Marinids detachments are dispatched to devastate a broad area from Medina-Sidonia to Carmona, Vejer de la Frontera, Écija and Seville, cutting down trees, orchards, and vineyards, destroying villages, and killing or capturing many inhabitants.
- May – King Sancho IV (the Brave) assembles his army at Seville and sends the Castilian fleet (some 100 ships) led by Admiral Benedetto I Zaccaria to blockade the mouth of the Guadalquivir River. Meanwhile, a Marinid detachment of 1,000 cavalry moves against Seville, routing the Castilians send out to oppose them. Turning eastward against Carmona and Alcalá de Guadaíra, the Marinids burn the suburbs, harvest and ruin orchards.
- May 22 – Marinid forces under Abu Yusuf Yaqub ibn Abd al-Haqq prolong their siege at Jerez de la Frontera. He sends his son Abu Yaqub Yusuf an-Nasr with 5,000 regulars, 2,000 cavalry, some 13,000 infantry and 2,000 archers to raid Seville and its environs on June 1. During June and early July, the Marinids assault daily Jerez while raiding parties pillage the countryside at Carmona, Niebla, Écija, Seville and Sanlúcar de Barrameda.
- August – Castilian forces led by Sancho IV (the Brave) march against the Marinids at Jerez de la Frontera. Meanwhile, Abu Yusuf Yaqub ibn Abd al-Haqq with his army of 18,000 cavalry and faced with dwindling supplies, decides to lift the siege after five months, on August 2. He withdraws his army to the safety of Algeciras and opens negotiations with Sancho while the Castilian fleet arrives at El Puerto de Santa Maria (or "The port of Saint Mary").
- September 4 – Battle of Les Formigues: An Aragonese-Sicilian fleet (some 40 galleys) under Admiral Roger of Lauria defeats French and Genoese ships near the Formigues Islands. According to Johan Esteve de Bezers, a French troubadour, all prisoners but one have their eyes gouged out, and that one is left with one eye to guide the others. After the battle, Roger captures about 15 to 20 French galleys, and others are sunk or burnt.
- October 1 – Battle of the Col de Panissars: Aragonese forces under King Peter III (the Great) ambush and defeat a French expeditionary army while it was retreating over the Pyrenees. The French troops are massacred by the Aragonese vanguard at the Panissar Pass, but spared the royal family. Philip III (the Bold) arrives with his fatigued remnants in Perpignan, where he dies of dysentery on October 5.
- November 2 – Peter III (the Great) dies after a 9-year reign at Vilafranca del Penedès. He is succeeded by his 20-year-old son Alfonso III (the Liberal), who becomes king of Aragon. Peter's other son James II (the Just), is crowned ruler of Sicily. His third son, the 13-year-old Frederick, becomes co-ruler and regent of Sicily.
- Winter – The Mongol Golden Horde led by Nogai Khan and Talabuga attacks Hungary for the second time. They successfully subdue Slovakia and sack territory north of the Carpathian Mountains.

==== England ====
- The Second Statute of Westminster is accepted in parliament, reforming various laws; it includes the clause de donis conditionalibus, considered one of the fundamental institutes of medieval law.
- The writ Circumspecte Agatis, issued by King Edward I (Longshanks), defines the jurisdictions of church and state, thereby limiting the church's judicial powers to ecclesiastical cases only.

==== Levant ====
- April 17 – Mamluk forces under Sultan Qalawun (the Victorious) appear with specially built war engines before the Crusader fortress of Margat and begin a siege. For a month, the Mamluks can make no progress and the assaults on the stronghold are repelled. Qalawun then invites a delegation of Knights Hospitaller to come and see the damage his engineers have done to the 'impregnable' fortifications. They understood they have no real choice and are forced to surrender on May 25. The Hospitallers are allowed to retire with all their possessions, on horseback and fully armed. The rest of the garrison is promised a safe-conduct to Tortosa – while Qalawun establishes a Mamluk garrison which he uses as a basis for further campaigns against the Crusader States.

==== Asia ====
- June 24 – Battle of Chương Dương: Joint forces of Champa and Đại Việt defeat the Mongol-led Yuan fleet on the Red River. Most of the Yuan warships are burned during the battle, and the Mongol army retreats to China in late June. The Vietnamese royal court returns to the capital in Thang Long following a six-month conflict.

=== By topic ===
==== Art and Culture ====
- The English romantic poem The Lay of Havelok the Dane is written (approximate date).

==== Markets ====
- The first record is made of an emission of life annuities, by the city of Lübeck. It is the first instance of issue of public debt in Germany, and it confirms a trend of consolidation of local public debt over north-western Europe (see 1228).
- The County of Champagne is integrated into the kingdom of France; the region loses its haven characteristics for foreign merchants, and the Fairs of Troyes quickly dwindle into economic insignificance.

==== Religion ====
- January 6 – Archbishop Jakub Świnka organizes a synod in Łęczyca. During the meeting, he orders all priests who are subject to his bishopric to deliver their sermons in Polish rather than German. This further unifies the Catholic Church in Poland and fosters a national identity.
- March 25 – Pope Martin IV dies after a 4-year pontificate in Perugia. He is succeeded by Honorius IV, who becomes the 190th pope of the Catholic Church.
- Council of Blachernae: The Eastern Orthodox Church repudiates the Union with the Catholic Church, declared in the Second Council of Lyon.
- The Mor Bar Sauma Monastery, one of the most important monasteries of the Syriac Orthodox Church, is destroyed. Though a monastic community remains, the patriarchal seat is moved to Sis.

== Births ==
- March 9 – Go-Nijō (or Nijō II), Japanese emperor (d. 1308)
- March 23 – Al-Mustakfi I, Mamluk ruler (caliph) of Egypt (d. 1340)
- March 24 – Al-Nasr Muhammad, Mamluk ruler of Egypt (d. 1341)
- April 9 – Ayurbarwada Buyantu Khan, Mongol emperor (d. 1320)
- May 1 – Edmund Fitzalan, English nobleman and knight (d. 1326)
- December 6 – Ferdinand IV, king of Castile and León (d. 1312)
- Alexander de Bruce, Scottish nobleman and knight (d. 1307)
- Euphemia of Pomerania, queen consort of Denmark (d. 1330)
- Francesco I Ventimiglia, Italian nobleman and knight (d. 1338)
- Gerardus Odonis, French cardinal and theologian (d. 1349)
- John of Jandun, French philosopher and theologian (d. 1328)
- Juan Alonso Pérez de Guzán, Spanish nobleman (d. 1351)
- Margaret of Artois, French noblewoman and regent (d. 1311)
- Patrick V de Dunbar, Scottish nobleman and knight (d. 1369)
- Richeza Magnusdotter, Swedish princess and abbess (d. 1348)
- William of Ockham, English monk and theologian ( d. 1347)
- Ziauddin Barani, Indian historian and philosopher (d. 1358)

== Deaths ==
- January 7 – Charles I, king of Sicily (House of Anjou) (b. 1227)
- February 8 – Theodoric of Landsberg, German nobleman (b. 1242)
- March 28 – Martin IV, pope of the Catholic Church (approximate date)
- May 13 – Robert de Ros, English nobleman and knight (b. 1235)
- May 20 – John I, king of Cyprus (House of Lusignan) (b. 1268)
- June 3 – William I van Brederode, Dutch nobleman and knight
- June 19 – Yekuno Amlak, Ethiopian ruler (House of Solomon)
- July 3 – Margaret of Flanders, French noblewoman (b. 1251)
- July 7 – Tile Kolup, German impostor claiming to be Frederick II
- July 28 – Keran of Lampron, queen of Cilician Armenia (b. 1260)
- July 30 – John I, German nobleman (House of Ascania) (b. 1249)
- August 16 – Philip I, French nobleman (House of Savoy) (b. 1207)
- August 18 – William Reade, English bishop and theologian (b. 1183)
- August 22 – Philip Benizi, Italian monk and religious leader (b. 1233)
- August 27 – William de Wickwane, English cleric and archbishop
- September 9 – Kunigunda of Halych, queen of Bohemia (b. 1245)
- September 26 – Theobald Butler, Norman chief governor (b. 1242)
- October 5 – Philip III, king of France (House of Capet) (b. 1245)
- November 2 – Peter III (the Great), king of Aragon (b. 1239)
- November 21 – Fulke Lovell, English archdeacon and bishop
- December 21 – Ordoño Álvarez, archbishop of Braga (b. 1198)
- Abu al-Baqa al-Rundi, Andalusian poet and literary critic (b. 1204)
- Christian III, German nobleman and knight (House of Oldenburg)
- Hermann of Buxhoeveden, German cleric and bishop (b. 1230)
- Izz al-Din ibn Shaddad, Syrian scholar and historian (b. 1217)
- João de Lobeira, Portuguese troubadour and writer (b. 1233)
- Nicolas Lorgne, French nobleman, knight and Grand Master
- Otto III (or IV), German nobleman (House of Ascania) (b. 1244)
- Paolo Malatesta (the Beautiful), Italian nobleman and knight
- Paul of Segni, Italian nobleman, friar, bishop and papal legate
- Philippe de Carteret, Norman nobleman and knight (b. 1205)
- Shihab al-Din al-Qarafi, Egyptian scholar and jurist (b. 1228)
