= 1222 Brescia earthquake =

1222 earthquake in Italy

- Location within Italy
- Local date: 25 December 1222
- Local time: 12:30
- Magnitude: unk.
- Epicenter: 45.55°N 10.22°E
- Areas affected: City-state of Brescia, city-state of Reggio, various parts of Tuscany and Lombardy
- Max. intensity: MMI X (Extreme)
- Casualties: 12,000 dead (est.)

The 1222 Brescia earthquake occurred on Christmas Day in the year 1222. In a document from the chronicler Salimbene de Adam, it is described that the earthquake was so severe people left the city in mass and camped outside, so that the falling buildings would not crush them.
