= 1227 =

1227 in various calendars
- Gregorian calendar: 1227; MCCXXVII
- Ab urbe condita: 1980
- Armenian calendar: 676; ԹՎ ՈՀԶ
- Assyrian calendar: 5977
- Balinese saka calendar: 1148–1149
- Bengali calendar: 633–634
- Berber calendar: 2177
- English Regnal year: 11 Hen. 3 – 12 Hen. 3
- Buddhist calendar: 1771
- Burmese calendar: 589
- Byzantine calendar: 6735–6736
- Chinese calendar: 丙戌年 (Fire Dog); 3924 or 3717 — to — 丁亥年 (Fire Pig); 3925 or 3718
- Coptic calendar: 943–944
- Discordian calendar: 2393
- Ethiopian calendar: 1219–1220
- Hebrew calendar: 4987–4988
- Hindu calendars
- Vikram Samvat: 1283–1284
- Shaka Samvat: 1148–1149
- Kali Yuga: 4327–4328
- Holocene calendar: 11227
- Igbo calendar: 227–228
- Iranian calendar: 605–606
- Islamic calendar: 624–625
- Japanese calendar: Karoku 3 / Antei 1 (安貞元年)
- Javanese calendar: 1135–1136
- Julian calendar: 1227; MCCXXVII
- Korean calendar: 3560
- Minguo calendar: 685 before ROC 民前685年
- Nanakshahi calendar: −241
- Thai solar calendar: 1769–1770
- Tibetan calendar: མེ་ཕོ་ཁྱི་ལོ་ (male Fire-Dog); 1353 or 972 or 200 — to — མེ་མོ་ཕག་ལོ་ (female Fire-Boar); 1354 or 973 or 201

Year 1227 (MCCXXVII) was a common year starting on Friday of the Julian calendar.

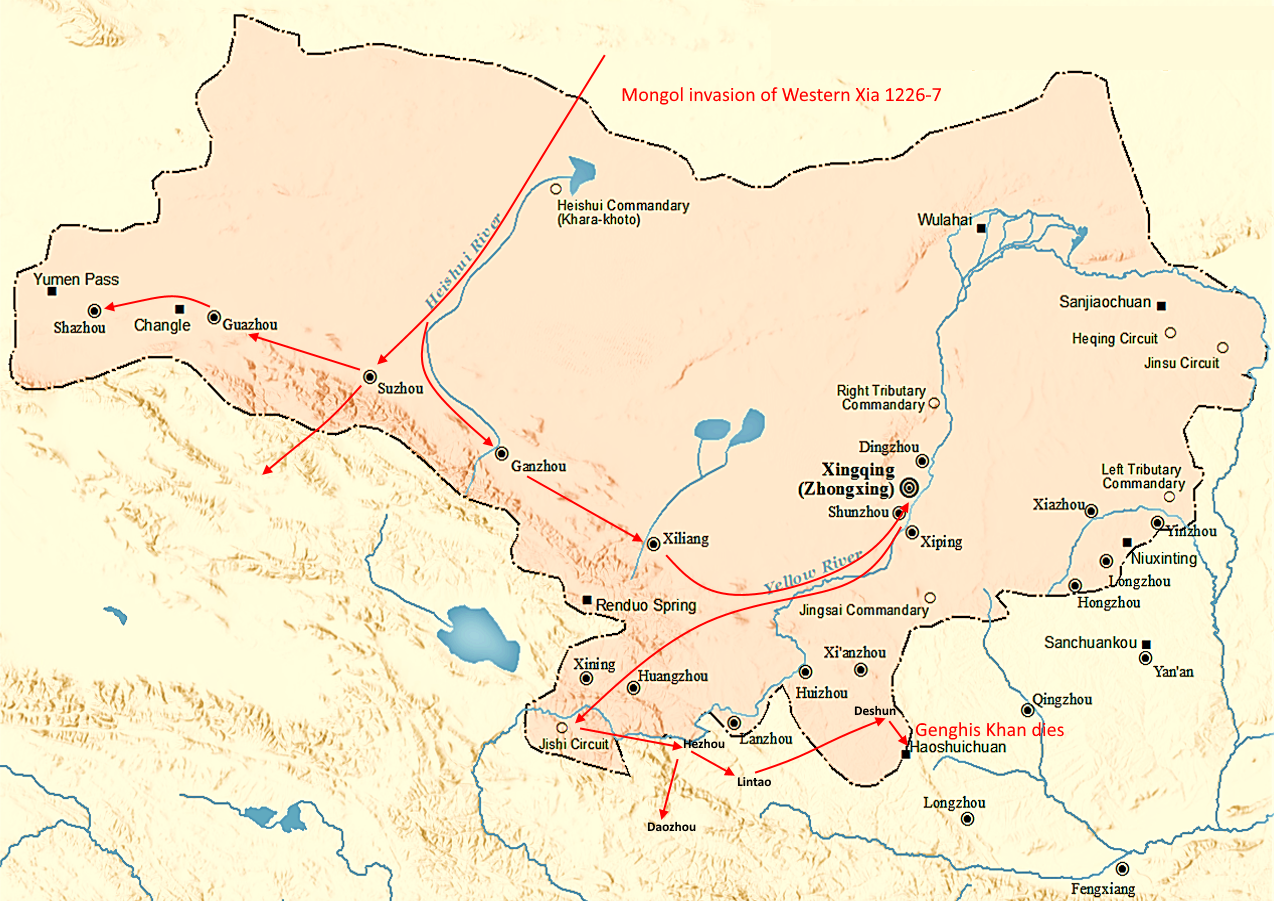
Mongol invasion of Western Xia (China)

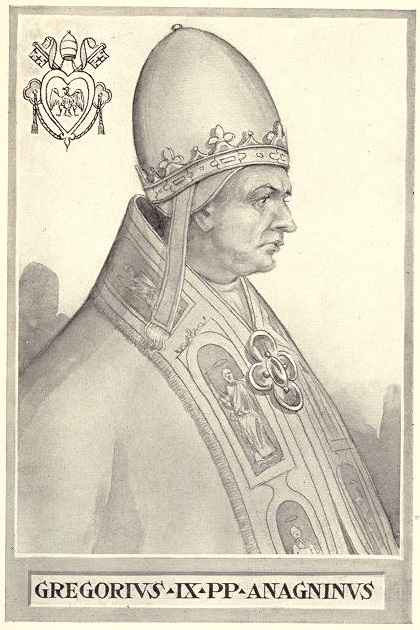
Pope Gregory IX (r. 1227–1241)

== Events ==
=== By place ===
==== Europe ====
- Spring – Livonian Crusade: The Livonian Brothers of the Sword and their Crusader allies (some 20,000 men) cross the sea ice from mainland Estonia, and defeat the last Estonian strongholds in the Battle of Muhu and the siege of the Valjala Stronghold in the Saaremaa islands. This marks the end of the Estonian campaign in the Livonian Crusade. The Sword Brothers conquer Danish Estonia, and Tallinn is given town rights under Riga law.
- July 22 – Battle of Bornhöved: Count Adolf IV of Holstein – leading a coalition army from the cities of Lübeck and Hamburg, defeats the Danish-German forces of King Valdemar II, and the Welf nobleman Otto I, Duke of Brunswick-Lüneburg ("the Child"). Adolf shakes off Danish supremacy and accepts an overlordship by the Archbishopric of Bremen under Archbishop Gerhard II of Lippe. Adolf expands his power and establishes new frontiers within the Holy Roman Empire.
- July 28 – Battle of Ane: Forces of the Bishopric of Utrecht are defeated by the rebellious Drenths led by Rudolph van Coevorden near Ane (modern Netherlands). The Drenths lure the Bishop's forces, supported by heavily armoured knights, in an ambush into a swampy area and kill Bishop Otto II of Lippe. After the battle, Otto's successor, Wilbrand van Oldenburg, rouses the Frisian people into supporting the war against the Drenths.
- August – Emperor Frederick II musters a German expeditionary force in Apulia. The crowded conditions and high heat contribute to discontent and disease among the assembled troops. On September 24, an epidemic of malaria enfeebles the army at Brindisi. Several thousand Crusaders led by Henry IV, duke of Limburg, and French and English mercenaries under the bishops Peter des Roches and William Briwere, arrive at Acre.
- September – A second contingent joined by Frederick II, departs from Brindisi to the Levant. On September 11, during the second day of the voyage, one of Fredericks' companions, Louis IV of Thuringia, dies of an illness (possibly cholera) at Otranto. Frederick also becomes sick and decides to return home, while sending the rest of the Crusader fleet (20 galleys) to Acre. There, they fortify the coastal towns of Caesarea and Jaffa.
- October 10 – Frederick II recovering at Pozzuoli, receives a letter from Pope Gregory IX, announcing his ex-communication. Frederick is branded a wanton violator of his sacred oath taken many times, at Aachen, Ferentino, Veroli and San Germano. Meanwhile, the Crusader army fortifies Sidon Sea Castle and rebuilds Montfort Castle, northeast of Acre, as a new headquarter castle for the Teutonic Knights, who called it Starkenburg.
- Swedish-Novgorodian War: Grand Prince Yaroslav II of Vladimir leads an attack from the Novgorod Republic on Baltic Finnic peoples in eastern Fennoscandia, called "Yem", whom he devastates.
- November 24 – Prince Leszek the White is assassinated in an ambush on a council of Polish dukes in the city of Gąsawa, an event which later becomes known as the Gąsawa massacre.

==== Mongol Empire ====
- Autumn – Prince Tolui, Mongol regent and youngest son of Genghis Khan, assembles a Kurultai in the homelands of Mongolia. He persuades the chieftains of the clan to carry out Genghis' wishes. Ögedei Khan receives the Great Khanate. Genghis' eldest son, Jochi, dies before him, and his lands are divided between his two sons Batu Khan and Orda Khan, who rule the Western provinces (the Golden Horde and White Horde). Genghis' second son, Chagatai Khan, inherits the former Uigur and Kara-Khanid Khanate (now called the Chagatai Khanate). Tolui receives the Mongol homelands.

==== Levant ====
- November 12 – Al-Mu'azzam Isa, Ayyubid ruler of Damascus, dies after a 11-year reign. He is succeeded by his 21-year-old son, An-Nasir Dawud, who faces opposition from his uncle, Sultan Al-Kamil of Egypt.

==== England ====
- Spring – The 19-year-old Henry III assumes control of the government. He appoints Hubert de Burgh as Governor of Rochester Castle and rewards him with the title Earl of Kent.

==== Asia ====
- Siege of Yinchuan: Mongol forces eliminate the Western Xia (or Xi Xia) and execute its last Emperor (Mo or Li Xian). Genghis Khan dies during the siege under debated circumstances, but this is kept secret from the army until the siege's end. Yinchuan is pillaged and its entire population is slaughtered or sold into slavery. Genghis orders the imperial family to be executed, effectively ending the Tangut royal lineage.
- August 18 – Genghis Khan dies during the fall of Yinchuan after a 21-year reign. His exact cause of death remains a mystery, and is variously attributed to being killed in action against the Western Xia, illness, falling from his horse, or wounds sustained during hunting. Genghis is succeeded by his third son, Ögedei Khan, who becomes the "Great Khan" of the Mongol Empire.

=== By topic ===
==== Cities and Towns ====
- January 11 – The city of Požga in Croatia is first mentioned, in a charter of King Andrew II of Hungary.
- Northleach in the Cotswolds, U.K. is granted a charter by King Henry III.

==== Religion ====
- Dōgen Zenji receives Dharma transmission and inka from his master Rujing in China, settling his "life's quest of the great matter", going on to introduce Sōtō Zen Buddhism into his native Japan.
- March 18 – Pope Honorius III dies at Rome after a pontificate of nearly 11 years. He is succeeded by Gregory IX as the 178th pope of the Catholic Church.
- September 29 – Gregory IX excommunicates Frederick II, due to his broken promises and delay of the Sixth Crusade.

== Births ==
- January 1 – Mujū Dōkyō, Japanese Buddhist monk (d. 1312)
- June 29 – Hōjō Tokiyori, Japanese regent (shikken) (d. 1263)
- September 30 – Nicholas IV, pope of the Catholic Church (d. 1292)
- Aju (or Achu), Mongol military leader and chancellor (d. 1287)
- Chomden Rigpe Raldri, Tibetan scholar and writer (d. 1305)
- Elisabeth of Bavaria, queen consort of Germany (d. 1273)
- Fang Hui (or Xugu), Chinese scholar and politician (d. 1307)
- Gertrude of Aldenberg, German noblewoman (d. 1297)
- Hōjō Nagatoki, Japanese samurai and regent (d. 1264)
- Hu Zhiyu, Chinese Sanqu poet and writer (d. 1293)
- William II of Holland, anti-king of Germany (d. 1256)

== Deaths ==
- January 28 – Henry Borwin I, Lord of Mecklenburg, German nobleman and knight
- March 18 – Honorius III, pope of the Catholic Church (b. 1150)
- April 28 – Henry V, Count Palatine of the Rhine ("the Elder"), German nobleman (b. 1173)
- July 23 – Qiu Chuji, Chinese Taoist religious leader (b. 1148)
- July 28 – Otto II of Lippe (or Utrecht), Dutch prince-bishop
- August 1 – Shimazu Tadahisa, Japanese warlord (b. 1179)
- August 25 – Genghis Khan, founder of the Mongol Empire
- September 11
  - Louis IV ("the Saint"), landgrave of Thuringia (b. 1200)
  - Oliver of Paderborn, German bishop and chronicler
- September 13 – Guillaume II, French nobleman and knight
- September 29 – Conrad of Urach, German cardinal-bishop
- October 4 – Abdallah al-Adil, Almohad governor and caliph
- October 10 – Daniel and companions, Franciscan martyrs
- November 12 – Al-Mu'azzam Isa, Ayyubid ruler (b. 1176)
- November 24 – Leszek the White, High Duke of Poland
- Abd al-Salam ibn Mashish al-Alami, Moroccan Sufi writer
- Guala Bicchieri, Italian cardinal and papal legate (b. 1150)
- Luke Netterville, Norman archdeacon and archbishop
- Minamoto no Michitomo, Japanese nobleman (b. 1171)
- Emperor Mo of Western Xia (or Li Xian), Chinese emperor
- Philip of Ibelin, Cypriot nobleman and regent (b. 1180)
- Renaud I, Count of Dammartin (or Reginald), French nobleman (b. 1165)
- Shalva of Akhaltsikhe, Georgian general and courtier.
- Ken Arok, founder and first ruler of Singhasari (b. 1182)
