= Rudolf von Güttingen =

Rudolf von Güttingen (died 9 September 1226 in Rome) was Abbot of Saint Gall from 1220 and Bishop of Chur from 1224 until his death. He is documented for the first time in 1208.

Rudolf descended from a noble family from the Canton of Thurgau. He had been a monk since 1208, became provost in 1211, dean and cellarar in 1219 and Abbot of Saint Gall in 1220. After the death of Arnold von Matsch, the Bishop of Chur, the cathedral chapter held a double election. However, the two people elected, Heinrich von Rialt and Albert von Güttingen, a brother of Rudolf's, already died in 1223, before the Pope had made a decision. Rudolf became Bishop of Chur not later than 1224. Pope Honorius III permitted him on 23 February 1224 to stay as Abbot of Saint Gall for three more years. Rudolf's extravagant lifestyle led to the indebtedness of the abbey and the Hochstift. In 1226, he accompanied Emperor Frederick II to Italy where he died of a fever in Rome. He was entombed in the Archbasilica of Saint John Lateran.

== Reading list ==
- Gatz, Erwin: Rudolf von Güttingen. in: Erwin Gatz (ed.): Die Bischöfe des Heiligen Römischen Reiches 1198 bis 1448. Duncker & Humblot, Berlin 2001, p. 138.
- Gössi, Anton: St. Gallen – Äbte: Rudolf von Güttingen, 1220–1226. In: Helvetia Sacra, III: Die Orden mit Benediktinerregel. 2/1: Frühe Klöster, die Benediktiner und Benediktinerinnen in der Schweiz. Francke Verlag, Bern 1986, p. 1298–99.
