= Vineae Domini custodes =

13th century papal bull

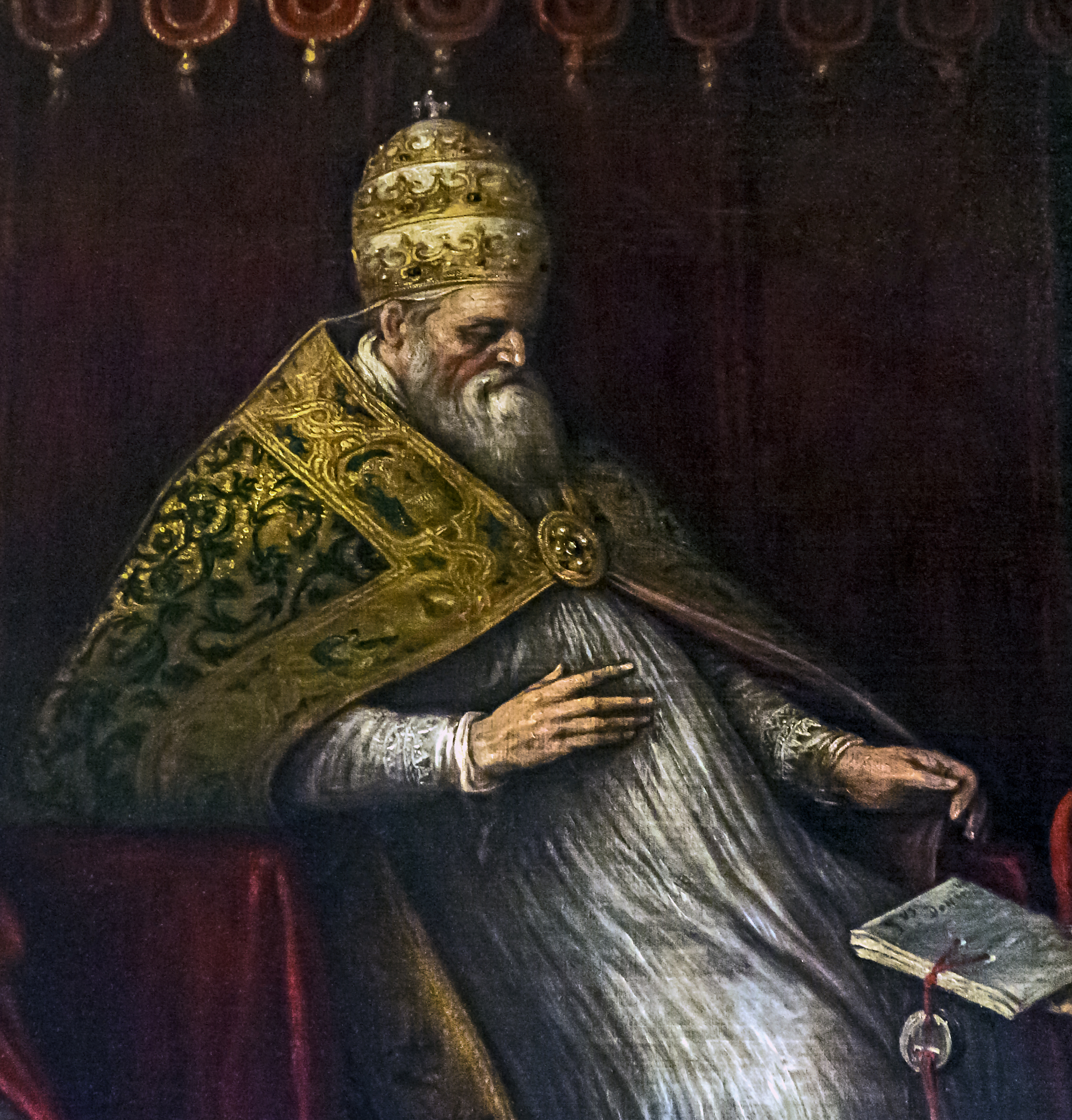
Pope Honorius III

Vineae Domini custodes is a papal bull issued by Pope Honorius III in which he granted the mendicant orders of the Dominicans and Franciscans the permission to establish a mission in the Almohad Caliphate.

== History ==
At some time before June 1225, two friars, Dominic of Segovia and Martin, asked pope Honorius III for approval of a mission to Morocco, then part of the Almohad empire. Honorius III granted them this permit in a letter dating to 10 June 1225. Drawing on the gospels, he told them that the goal should be to “convert the infidel, build up the fallen, strengthen the weak, comfort the doubters, and confirm the strong.” The invitation to convert Muslims marked a departure from the previous policy of popes who had limited the mission of priests and friars to pastoral care among the local Christians. Honorius reissued the bull in October, this time calling on the Dominicans and Franciscans to join the Moroccan mission. He also ordered Archbishop Rodrigo Jiménez de Rada to send Dominican and Franciscan friars to undertake conversions by preaching and to appoint one of the friars as Bishop of Morocco, a role that Domonic of Segovia would take.

== Sources ==
- Fonnesberg-Schmidt, Iben (2007). The Popes and the Baltic Crusades: 1147–1254. Brill. ISBN 978-90-04-15502-2.
- Whalen, Brett Edward (2011). "Corresponding with Infidels: Rome, the Almohads, and the Christians of Thirteenth-Century Morocco". Journal of Medieval and Early Modern Studies. 41 (3): 487–513. doi:10.1215/10829636-1363927. ISSN 1082-9636.
