= Ahmad ibn Munim al-Abdari =

Ahmad ibn Ibrahim ibn Ali ibn Munim al-Abdari (Arabic: أحمد بن ابراهيم بن علي بن منعم الأبداري; died 1228), often referred to as ibn Munim, was a mathematician, originally from Dénia in Andalusia. He lived and taught in Marrakesh where he was known as one of the best scholars in geometry and number theory. He is often confused with Muhammad ibn 'Abd al Mun'im, a different mathematician who worked in the court of Roger II of Sicily.
