= Fang Hui =

Fang Hui (Chinese: 方回), also called Wanli (万里), Tuanfu (团甫), Xugu (虚谷), and Yangshanren (阳山人), was a scholar of the late Song and early Yuan dynasties from Huizhou's She (歙) county (in present-day Anhui province), who lived from 1227 to 1307. He controversially accepted offices from the invading Yuan dynasty.
