= Hu Zhiyu =

Hu Zhiyu (Chinese: 胡祇遹; 1227–1293), courtesy name Shaowen (紹聞) or Shaokai (紹開), art name Zishan (紫山), was an official and writer of Chinese sanqu poetry of the Yuan dynasty.

Hu Zhiyu was from Hebei, then under the rule of the Jin dynasty, and orphaned early in life. Nonetheless, he applied himself to his studies and associated with others of exceptional ability. In the 1260s he rose to the high official position of Erudite of the Court of Imperial Sacrifices. However he earned the enmity of Ahmad Fanakati. Hu was then obliged to fill lesser official positions. Others wrote of him that officials feared him while ordinary people loved him. His writings were largely poetry. He was much influenced by Song poetry with its directness and lack or ornament. His sanqu verses were highly literate, a characteristic of the time. He was likewise gifted at a variety of literary forms, as well as a skilled calligrapher.

== See also ==
- Qu (poetry)
