= Wang Yun (Yuan dynasty) =

Wang Yun (Chinese: 王惲, 1228–1304) was a writer of Chinese sanqu poetry from Weizhou (卫州, in modern Henan province). He was born during the Jin dynasty, but became an official under the Yuan dynasty. Initially a local official, he was given a series of appointments in Central Region, Henan Jiangbei and Jiangzhe provinces starting in 1268. Later he was summoned to the capital where he served in the Hanlin Academy. At twenty, he became the acquaintance of the renowned writer Yuan Haowen. He was a noted prose stylist in the Tang manner of unadorned directness. His poetry often depicted the downtrodden and the poor. His collected works in one-hundred fascicles is extant. A biography of Wang exists in the official history of the Yuan dynasty (元史). Forty-one of his sanqu are extant.

== See also ==
- Qu (poetry)
