= Ghabdula Chelbir =

Ruler of Volga Bulgaria from 1178 to 1225

- Khan of Volga Bulgaria; Emir of the Bulgars
- Reign: 1178 - 1225
- Died: 1225
- Father: Otak
- Religion: Sunni Islam

Ghabdula Chelbir Mustansir (or only Chelbir; Tatar: Ğabdulla Çəlber) was the ruler of Volga Bulgaria from 1178 to 1225. He was the son of Otak. During the reign of Chelbir, Volga Bulgaria strengthened its economy and military. Over his reign, the capital moved from Bolghar to Bilär. The Battle of Samara Bend was the first battle between Volga Bulgaria and the Mongols, probably one of the first large battles the Mongols lost. It took place in autumn 1223, at the southern border of Volga Bulgaria. The Bulgars retreated and the Mongols pursued them. Then the main Bulgar forces ambushed the Mongols.

== See also ==
- List of rulers of Volga Bulgaria
