= Urso of Calabria =

- Died: 1225
- Occupation: Philosopher

Urso of Calabria, also Urso of Salerno, Ursus Salernitanus, Urso di Calabria (died 1225) was an Italian scholastic philosopher and significant author of medical works in the school of Salerno. He has been thought the leading figure of the school and its most important theoretician and Aristotelian. He had a European reputation.

== Works ==
- Anatomia
- Compendium de urinis
- De commixtionibus elementorum
- Glossulae
- De effectibus medicinarum
- De effectibus qualitatum
- De criticis diebus
- De pulsibus
- De saporibus et numero eorundem
- Aphorismi
