= 1251 =

1251 in various calendars
- Gregorian calendar: 1251; MCCLI
- Ab urbe condita: 2004
- Armenian calendar: 700; ԹՎ Չ
- Assyrian calendar: 6001
- Balinese saka calendar: 1172–1173
- Bengali calendar: 657–658
- Berber calendar: 2201
- English Regnal year: 35 Hen. 3 – 36 Hen. 3
- Buddhist calendar: 1795
- Burmese calendar: 613
- Byzantine calendar: 6759–6760
- Chinese calendar: 庚戌年 (Metal Dog); 3948 or 3741 — to — 辛亥年 (Metal Pig); 3949 or 3742
- Coptic calendar: 967–968
- Discordian calendar: 2417
- Ethiopian calendar: 1243–1244
- Hebrew calendar: 5011–5012
- Hindu calendars
- Vikram Samvat: 1307–1308
- Shaka Samvat: 1172–1173
- Kali Yuga: 4351–4352
- Holocene calendar: 11251
- Igbo calendar: 251–252
- Iranian calendar: 629–630
- Islamic calendar: 648–649
- Japanese calendar: Kenchō 3 (建長３年)
- Javanese calendar: 1160–1161
- Julian calendar: 1251; MCCLI
- Korean calendar: 3584
- Minguo calendar: 661 before ROC 民前661年
- Nanakshahi calendar: −217
- Thai solar calendar: 1793–1794
- Tibetan calendar: ལྕགས་ཕོ་ཁྱི་ལོ་ (male Iron-Dog); 1377 or 996 or 224 — to — ལྕགས་མོ་ཕག་ལོ་ (female Iron-Boar); 1378 or 997 or 225

Year 1251 (MCCLI) was a common year starting on Sunday of the Julian calendar.

== Events ==
=== By place ===
==== Europe ====
- April – The first Shepherds' Crusade, a domestic French uprising in response to events in Egypt during the Seventh Crusade, occurs.
- May – English governor Simon de Montfort suppresses a revolt in Gascony.
- December 26 – King Alexander III of Scotland marries Margaret, daughter of King Henry III of England, precipitating a power struggle between the two monarchs.
- Andrew de Longjumeau, dispatched two years earlier by King Louis IX of France as an ambassador to the Mongols, meets the king in Palestine, with reports from the Mongols and Tartary; his mission is considered a failure.
- Mindaugas of Lithuania is baptized, in prelude to his crowning as King of Lithuania in 1253.
- Alexander Nevsky signs the first peace treaty between Kievan Rus' and Norway.
- King Conrad IV of Germany invades Italy, but fails to subdue the supporters of Pope Innocent IV.
- Ottokar II of Bohemia, later to become King of Bohemia, is elected Duke of Austria.
- The earliest known manuscript of The Proverbs of Alfred, a collection of sayings of England's Alfred the Great, is written.

==== Asia ====
- April 21 – City of Launggyet in Arakan (modern-day Burma) is founded according to some sources.
- July 1 – Möngke Khan is elected as the fourth great Khan of the Mongol Empire.
- The carving of the Tripitaka Koreana, a collection of Buddhist scriptures recorded on some 81,000 wooden blocks, is completed.

== Births ==
- June 5 – Hōjō Tokimune, 8th regent of the Kamakura shogunate (d. 1284)
- September 2 – Francis of Fabriano, Italian writer (d. 1322)
- Adelaide, Countess of Auxerre, French countess (d. 1290)

== Deaths ==
- January – Bohemund V of Antioch
- February 9 – Matthias II, Duke of Lorraine
- March 6 – Rose of Viterbo, Italian saint (b. 1235)
- March 31 – William of Modena, Bishop of Modena
- June 6 – William III of Dampierre, Count of Flanders
- date unknown
  - Winter 1251–52 – Eljigidei, Mongol commander of Persia, killed
  - Isobel of Huntingdon, Scots noblewoman (b. 1199)
  - Oghul Qaimish, 3rd regent of the Mongol Empire, following her husband's death
