= Chomden Rigpe Raldri =

Chomden Rigpe Raldri (1227–1305) (Tibetan: བཅོམ་ལྡན་རིག་པའི་རལ་གྲི།, Wylie: bcom ldan rig pa'i ral gri) was an important scholar of the Sakya school, who was involved in the editing of the Tibetan canon. He wrote an early work on spelling (dag yig). He was born in Phu thang in Lho-kha and spent most of his career at Snar thang monastery.
