= 1100s (decade) =

Decade

The 1100s was a decade of the Julian Calendar which began on January 1, 1100, and ended on December 31, 1109.

== Events ==
=== 1100 ===
==== By place ====
====== Levant ======
- January – The Seljuk ruler Mahmud I is expelled from Baghdad by his brother Barkiyaruq, but Mahmud manages to retake the city, during his spring offensive.
- May or June – Raymond IV (Saint-Gilles) sails to Constantinople to obtain the support of Emperor Alexios I (Komnenos), in his attempt to seize Tripoli.
- August 1 – A Genoese fleet leaves Italy, to support the Crusaders' efforts to conquer the coastal cities; the ships reach Latakia on September 25.
- August – Battle of Melitene: Bohemond I is captured by the Danishmends, leaving Tancred as regent of the Principality of Antioch for two years.
- August 20 – With the support of a Venetian fleet, the Crusaders under Tancred capture the coastal city of Haifa.
- December 25 – French Crusader Baldwin I is crowned first King of Jerusalem at the Church of the Nativity in Bethlehem, by Daimbert, the new Latin Patriarch of Jerusalem, following the death of the previous ruler, Baldwin's brother Godfrey of Bouillon, on July 18.
- After a success over the Armenians of Cilicia and the Emirate of Aleppo, Baldwin of Bourcq becomes Count of Edessa, with the support of Daimbert.
- Genoa, Venice and Pisa gain trading privileges from the Crusader states, in return for their service during the conquest of the coastal cities.

====== Europe ======
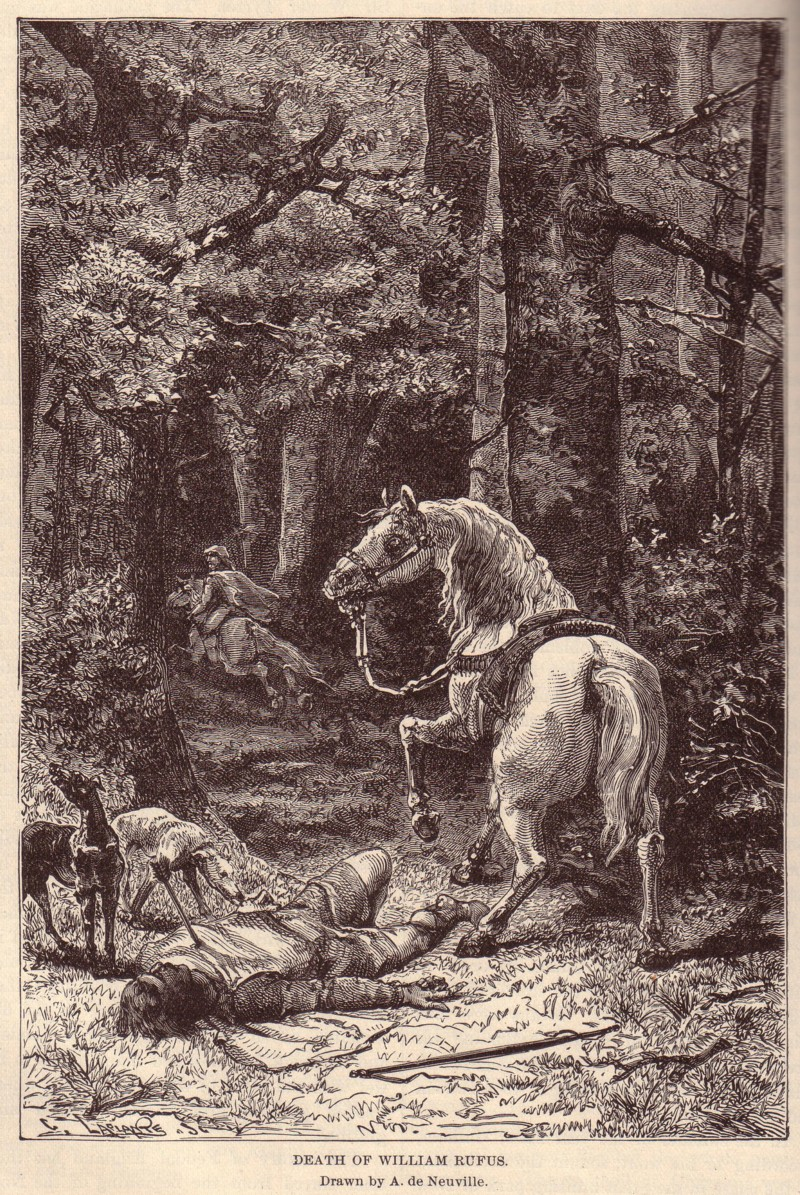
2 August: death of William II of England during a hunt, killed by an arrow of Walter Tirel.

- August 2 – King William II (or William Rufus) dies in a hunting accident in the New Forest. Sir Walter Tirel is accused of having shot the arrow, but flees the country to avoid a trial. Henry I claims the throne.
- August 5 – Henry I is crowned King of England, at Westminster Abbey. The power of the new monarch is ill-assured, and to mollify the barons he has to grant them the Charter of Liberties, one of the first examples of a written constitution in Europe.
- August 30 – After the failure of the Council of Liubech in 1097, the Congress of Vytechev establishes peace and the feudal system in Kievan Rus; the princes come to an agreement to share the country between them. Sviatopolk II of Kiev becomes the first Grand Prince.
- September 16 – Battle of Malagon: The Almoravid army defeats the Castellan troops.
- September 23 – Anselm, archbishop of Canterbury returns from exile, at the invitation of Henry I.
- October 18 – Peter I of Aragon conquers Barbastro (modern Spain) from the hands of the Almoravids.
- November 11 – Henry I marries Matilda of Scotland, the daughter of King Malcolm III and a direct descendant of the Saxon king Edmund Ironside.
- November 18 – The Council of Poitiers opens, but is soon forcibly closed by William IX, duke of Aquitaine, as the bishops are about to excommunicate King Philip I once more.
- December 25 – Philip I elevates his son Louis VI as co-ruler to the government of the realm.
- Philip I conquers the Vexin area, and adds the city of Bourges and the province of Berry to his estate.
- In Iceland, the Althing decides that the laws should be transferred to a written form (approximate date).
- Intense urban activity in north and central Europe: Kalmar (Kungälv) and Varberg (Sweden) are chartered; The cities of Aach (southern Germany) and Nakléřov in Bohemia are created. The castle of Burg Eppstein is built in central Germany.
- Henry I grants the ownership of Carisbrooke Castle on the Isle of Wight to Richard de Redvers, a Norman nobleman.

====== Africa ======
- A collective of Tuareg trading clans decide to permanently settle the city of Timbuktu (modern Mali) north of Djenné along the Niger River. Timbuktu will later achieve fame as a center of Islamic learning. The Sankore, Djinguereber and Sidi Yahya mosques are among Timbuktu's most famous religious and scholarly institutions (approximate date).

====== China ======
- February 23 – Emperor Zhezong dies after a 15-year reign. He is succeeded by his 17-year-old brother Huizong as ruler of the Song dynasty. At about this date, the Chinese population reaches around 100 million and in Kaifeng, his capital, the number of registered citizens within the walls is about 1,050,000 with the army stationed here boosting the overall populace to some 1.4 million people.
- The Liao dynasty crushes the Zubu, a tribute state of the Khitan Empire, and takes their khan prisoner.

====== Americas ======
- Oraibi, a Hopi village in Navajo County, becomes the oldest populated settlement in modern-day Arizona (modern-day United States).
- The Ancestral Puebloans culture, located in the modern-day Four Corners (United States), rises (approximate date).
- The city of Cusco (modern Peru) is founded (approximate date).

==== By topic ====
====== Religion ======
- September 8 – Antipope Clement III dies at Civita Castellana after a 20-year reign in opposition to the legitimate popes Gregory VII, Victor III and Urban II. Supporters of Emperor Henry IV in Rome choose Theodoric as his successor.
- November – The council of Poitiers decrees that the followers of Robert of Arbrissel have to settle down and live under a rule, leading to the foundation of Fontevraud Abbey.
- Frederick I becomes archbishop of Cologne, and begins the construction of the castle of Volmarstein.
- The Stift St. Georgen Abbey is founded near Sankt Georgen am Längsee (modern Austria).
- The Diocese of Faroe is founded (approximate date).

====== Sports and games ======
- Checkers is invented (approximate date).

=== 1101 ===
==== By place ====
====== Byzantine Empire ======
- Crusade of 1101 – A second wave of European crusaders attempts to cross Anatolia, to reach the Kingdom of Jerusalem. They are defeated by the Seljuk troops under Sultan Kilij Arslan I, at Heraclea. A handful of crusaders under Raymond IV manage to reach the Byzantine port of Bafra, at the mouth of the River Halys.
- Summer – The Byzantine fleet under Admiral Eustathios recaptures the ports of western Cilicia, Seleucia and Corycus. Eustathios extends his power over Cilician territory (belonging to Bohemond I) further east – occupying Tarsus, Adana and Mamistra.

====== Levant ======
- Spring – King Baldwin I concludes an alliance with the Genoese fleet, offering them commercial privileges and booty. He captures the towns of Arsuf and Caesarea. Baldwin's crusaders pillage Caesarea and massacre the majority of the local population.
- September 7 – Battle of Ramla: A Crusader force (some 1,100 men) under Baldwin I defeats the invading Fatimids at Ramla (modern Israel). Baldwin plunders the Fatimid camp and the survivors flee to Ascalon.

====== Europe ======
- June 22 – Roger I, count of Sicily, dies at Mileto in Calabria after a 30-year reign. He is succeeded by his 8-year-old son Simon of Hauteville, while his mother, Adelaide del Vasto, acts as his regent.
- Summer – Almoravid forces under Sultan Yusuf ibn Tashfin besiege Valencia, which is defended by Jimena Díaz, widow of Rodrigo Diaz de Vivar. The city holds out until May 1102.
- Autumn – Countess Mathilda of Tuscany leads a successful expedition in northern Italy and takes Ferrara.
- The county of Berg in Germany is established.

====== England ======
- February 3 – Ranulf Flambard, bishop of Durham, escapes from the Tower of London and flees to Normandy. There he joins Robert Curthose, duke of Normandy, who has just returned from the Crusades.
- July 20 – Robert Curthose lands at Portsmouth with an army in an effort to take the English throne from his younger brother, Henry I.
- August 2 – By the Treaty of Alton, ratified at Winchester, Robert abandons his claim to the throne, recognising Henry as King of England.

==== By topic ====
====== Culture ======
- A vast compilation of Liao, Korean, and Song Buddhist writings is completed (approximate date).

====== Religion ======
- Spring – Antipope Theodoric dies, the partisans of Emperor Henry IV choose Adalbert as the new antipope.
- April 19 – King Canute IV of Denmark is canonized as a saint under the name San Canuto.
- Fontevraud Abbey is founded by the French preacher Robert of Arbrissel.

=== 1102 ===
==== By place ====
====== Levant ======
- Spring – A Fatimid expeditionary force (some 20,000 men) invades Palestine and launches attacks into the Kingdom of Jerusalem. The Crusaders defeat a Fatimid rearguard near Ascalon, and capture the city after a 3-year siege. The Crusaders capture Caesarea Maritima with support of the Genoese fleet. A number of Genoese trading colonies are established along the Mediterranean coast.
- Siege of Tripoli: The Crusaders under Raymond IV begin the siege of Tripoli (modern Lebanon). The garrison calls for assistance, but a Seljuk relief army from Damascus and Homs is defeated by Raymond.
- May 17 – Battle of Ramla: The Crusaders (500 knights) under King Baldwin I are defeated by the Fatimid army at Ramla (modern Israel). Baldwin and his companions escape through the enemy lines to Arsuf.
- May 27 – The Crusaders under Baldwin I break their way out of Jaffa, which is encircled by the Fatimid Army. A charge of the French cavalry breaks the enemy's ranks, and forces them to retreat to Ascalon.
- Raymond IV is imprisoned by Tancred, nephew of Bohemond I, and regent of the Principality of Antioch (he is later released after promising to denounce any claims).
- Dagobert of Pisa is briefly deposed as Patriarch of Jerusalem (he is restored later in the year).
- The Venetians establish a new trade emporium in Sidon (modern Lebanon).

====== Europe ======
- May 5 – The short-lived principality created by Rodrigo Diaz de Vivar ends: Valencia is captured by Almoravid forces under Sultan Yusuf ibn Tashfin. It is later recaptured, evacuated and burned by King Alfonso VI.
- June 4 – Władysław I Herman, duke of Poland, dies at Płock (possibly poisoned by his enemies) after a 23-year reign. He leaves the succession to be disputed between his sons Zbigniew and Bolesław III Wrymouth.
- The Pacta Conventa formed by the Croatian nobility, recognize King Coloman as their overlord, initiating the personal union between the two kingdoms. Coloman is crowned king of Croatia (until 1116).

====== England ======
- King Henry I captures Arundel Castle after having besieged Earl Robert of Bellême. Robert loses his English lands (as did his brothers Roger the Poitevin and Arnulf de Montgomery) and is banished to Normandy.

==== By topic ====
====== Religion ======
- Council of London: A church council convened by Anselm, archbishop of Canterbury, bans sodomy and the sale of Christian slaves to non-Christian countries, and reforms the clergy.
- Henry I orders the tomb of Edward the Confessor be opened; the body of the former king is supposedly found undecayed. The Westminster monks start to claim Edward as a saint.

=== 1103 ===
==== By place ====
====== Levant ======
- Spring – Bohemond I, Norman prince of Antioch, is released from Seljuk imprisonment at Niksar, after a ransom is paid of 100,000 gold pieces. During his absence, Tancred (Bohemond's nephew) attacks the Byzantines, and re-captures the cities of Tarsus, Adana and Mamistra in Cilicia. Tancred is deprived of his lordship by Bohemond's return, and is rewarded with a small fief within the Principality of Antioch.
- The Crusaders under Raymond IV invade the Beqaa Valley and capture Tortosa to isolate Tripoli. Raymond expands towards the Orontes River, and begins to build a castle on the Mons Peregrinus which helps in the Siege of Tripoli (see 1102). Emperor Alexios I supports the Crusaders by sending a Byzantine fleet (ten ships) to blockade the port of Tripoli.
- Summer – The Crusaders led by Bohemond I and Joscelin of Courtenay raid the territory of Aleppo to gain supplies. They capture the town of Muslimiyah, and extract a large tribute. Sultan Fakhr al-Mulk Radwan, the Seljuk ruler of Aleppo, agrees to pay 7,000 gold pieces and ten horses to the Crusaders while Bohemond agrees to release all Seljuk prisoners captured at Muslimiyah.

====== Europe ======
- August 24 – King Magnus III is killed in battle with the Ulaid in Ulster. Sigurd Jorsalfare, Øystein Magnusson and Olaf Magnusson succeed him as joint kings of Norway.

====== Britain ======
- April 27 – Anselm, archbishop of Canterbury, again goes into exile after a dispute with King Henry I over the appointment of bishops and abbots to important Church positions.
- August 5 – Matilda of Scotland, queen of England as wife of Henry I, gives birth to their first son William Adelin at Winchester. They already have a daughter, Princess Matilda.

====== China ======
- Li Jie, Chinese government minister, publishes his Yingzao Fashi technical treatise on Chinese architecture, during the reign of Emperor Hui Zong of the Song Dynasty.

==== By topic ====
====== Religion ======
- The Scandinavian city of Lund in the Swedish province of Scania becomes a see of the Catholic Church, namely the Archdiocese of Lund (approximate date).

=== 1104 ===
==== By place ====
====== Byzantine Empire ======
- Summer – The Byzantines re-occupy the Cilician cities of Tarsus, Adana and Mamistra. A naval squadron, under Admiral Cantacuzenus, pursues in Cypriot waters a Genoese raiding fleet, and sails on to Latakia, where they capture the harbour and the lower city. Bohemond I reinforces the garrison in the citadel.

====== Levant ======
- Spring – The Crusaders, led by Bohemond I, re-invade the territory of Aleppo, and try to capture the town of Kafar Latha. The attack fails, owing to the resistance of the local Banu tribe. Meanwhile, Joscelin of Courtenay cuts the communications between Aleppo and the Euphrates.
- May 7 – Battle of Harran: The Crusaders under Baldwin II are defeated by the Seljuk Turks. Baldwin and Joscelin of Courtenay are taken prisoner. Tancred (nephew of Bohemond I) becomes regent of Edessa. The defeat at Harran marks a key turning point of Crusader expansion.
- May 26 – King Baldwin I captures Acre, the port is besieged from April, and blockaded by the Genoese and Pisan fleet. Baldwin promises a free passage to those who want to move to Ascalon, but the Italian sailors plunder the wealthy Muslim emigrants and kill many of them.
- Autumn – Bohemond I departs to Italy for reinforcements. He takes with him gold and silver, and precious stuff to raise an army against Emperor Alexios I Komnenos. Tancred becomes co-ruler over Antioch – and appoints his brother-in-law, Richard of Salerno, as his deputy.
- Toghtekin, Seljuk ruler (atabeg) of Damascus, founds a short-lived principality in Syria (the first example of a series of Seljuk-ruled dynasties).

====== England ======
- September 3 – St. Cuthbert is reburied in Durham Cathedral.

====== Europe ======
- September 28 – Alfonso I becomes king of Aragon and Navarre (after the death of his half-brother Peter I).
- King David IV of Georgia defeats 100,000 Seljuk Turks with only 1,500 warriors (approximate date).
- Sultan Kilij Arslan I of the Sultanate of Rum starts a war with the Danishmendids.
- The Venetian Arsenal is founded in Venice.

==== By topic ====
====== Religion ======
- April 21 – The new basilica at Vézelay Abbey (located in northern Burgundy in France) is dedicated.

====== Volcanology ======
- Autumn – The volcano Hekla erupts in Iceland and devastates farms for 45 miles (some 70 km) around.

=== 1105 ===
==== By place ====
====== Levant ======
- February 28 – Raymond IV dies at his castle of Mons Peregrinus ("Pilgrim's Mountain") near Tripoli. Raymond leaves his 2-year-old son Alfonso I by his third wife, Elvira of Castile, to rule the County of Tripoli. Raymond's nephew William-Jordan, count of Cerdagne, becomes regent over Alfonso. Bertrand, the eldest son of Raymond, inherits the title 'Count of Toulouse'.
- April 20 – Battle of Artah: The Crusaders under Tancred, Norman prince and regent of Antioch, defeat a Seljuk army (some 7,000 men) at Artah (modern-day Reyhanlı). Tancred threatens Aleppo, capital of Sultan Fakhr al-Mulk Radwan, and expands his conquest by conquering more territory east of the Orontes River with minor opposition.
- August 27 – Battle of Ramla: The Crusaders under King Baldwin I defeat a Fatimid expeditionary force (some 15,000 men) at Ramla. Baldwin pillages the enemy camp – but does not further pursue the Fatimids. The battle ends in the last large-scale attempt of the Fatimids to reconquer Palestine.

====== Europe ======
- The Almoravid emir, Yusuf ibn Tashfin, sends a maritime expedition to Palestine from Sevilla to ward off the Crusaders and perhaps to reconquer Jerusalem. The fleet of about seventy ships rushes into a storm in the Mediterranean Sea, and is never seen again.
- Bohemond I, Norman prince of Antioch, arrives in Apulia (Southern Italy) after an absence of 9 years. He travels to Rome and meets Pope Paschal II. His cousin, Roger II becomes count of Sicily.
- Autumn – Bohemond I and papal legate Bruno travel to the north of France and visit the court of King Philip I ("the Amorous"). Bohemond gets permission to recruit men throughout the kingdom.
- Inge the Elder dies and is succeeded by his nephew Philip as ruler of Sweden. He and his brother Inge the Younger rule the kingdom together (until the death of Philip in 1118).
- December 31 – Henry IV, Holy Roman Emperor, is deposed by his son Henry V (who is king of Germany). Henry is forced to resign his crown and is imprisoned in the castle of Böckelheim.

====== England ======
- Summer – King Henry I invades Normandy, takes Bayeux (after a short siege) and Caen. He advances on Falaise, and starts inconclusive peace negotiations with Duke Robert II. Henry withdraws to deal with political issues at home.
- Henry I meets Anselm, archbishop of Canterbury, under threat of excommunication at L'Aigle in Normandy to settle their disputes that has led to Anselm's exile from England (see 1103).

====== Seljuk Empire ======
- Sultan Barkiyaruq dies in Borujerd (modern Iran) after a 13-year reign. He is succeeded by his son Malik-Shah II, but is deposed and killed by his uncle Muhammad I. Muhammad becomes ruler of the Seljuk Empire, but his brother Ahmad Sanjar (Seljuk ruler of Khorasan) holds more power as co-ruler.
- Autumn – Kilij Arslan I, sultan of the Sultanate of Rum, leads a Seljuk expedition to take over Melitene (modern Turkey). He attempts to capture Edessa, but the Crusader fortress is too strongly defended by its garrison. Kilij Arslan then moves on to Harran, which surrenders to him.

====== Asia ======
- The Tamna Kingdom is annexed by the Korean Goryeo Dynasty.

==== By topic ====
====== Religion ======
- Winter – Sylvester IV is elected as antipope in Rome by members of the Roman aristocracy, with support of Henry V.

=== 1106 ===
==== By place ====
====== Europe ======
- Spring – Bohemond I, prince of Antioch, marries Constance of France (daughter of King Philip I) in the cathedral of Chartres. Philip agrees to marry his second daughter, the 9-year-old Cecile of France, to Tancred (nephew of Bohemond). Meanwhile, Bohemond mobilises an expeditionary force (some 30,000 men) to begin a campaign against Emperor Alexios I.
- August 7 – Emperor Henry IV escapes his captors at Ingelheim. He enters into negotiations at Cologne with English, French and Danish noblemen, and begins to collect an army to oppose his son Henry V but dies at Liège after a 49-year reign. Henry leads a successful expedition against Count Robert II of Flanders and is forced to swear his allegiance to him.
- September 28 – Battle of Tinchebray: King Henry I defeats and imprisons his older brother Robert II, duke of Normandy, in Devizes Castle. Edgar Atheling (uncle of Henry's wife) and the 3-year-old William Clito, son of Robert, are also taken prisoner. Henry places his nephew William in the custody of Helias of Saint-Saens, count of Arques.
- Autumn – Bohemond I returns to Apulia (Southern Italy) with an expeditionary force to prepare an offensive against the Byzantines. He is accompanied by his newlywed wife Constance (who is pregnant by him) and followers.
- Sultan Yusuf ibn Tashfin dies after a 45-year reign. He is succeeded by his 22-year-old son Ali ibn Yusuf as ruler of the Almoravid Empire. Ali appoints his brother Tamin ibn Yusuf as governor of Al-Andalus (modern Spain).
- Bolesław III, duke of Poland, begins a civil war against his half-brother Zbigniew, for control over Lesser Poland and Silesia.
- The city of Balaguer (located in Catalonia) is conquered from the Moors by Ermengol VI, count of Urgell.

====== Britain ======
- Roger le Poer, bishop of Salisbury, is granted land in south Wales by Henry I. He starts the construction of Kidwelly Castle on the banks of the river Gwendraeth.
- Magnus Erlendsson becomes Earl of Orkney (until 1115).

==== By topic ====
====== Astronomy ======
- February 2 – A comet (the Great Comet of 1106) is seen and reported by several civilisations around the world. Lasting for 40 days, the comet grows steadily in brightness until finally fading away.

=== 1107 ===
==== By place ====
====== Scotland ======
- January 8 – King Edgar dies at Edinburgh Castle after a 9-year reign. He is succeeded by his brother Alexander I, who is married to Sybilla of Normandy (an illegitimate daughter of King Henry I). A split of unity, between Alexander and his younger brother David I, makes David co-ruler in Lothian and Strathclyde (Southern Scotland). He does not receive the title of king, but of "Prince of the Cumbrians".

====== England ======
- August 11 – The Investiture Controversy is resolved, by the reconciliation of Henry I and Anselm, archbishop of Canterbury and the mass consecration of bishops by Anselm at the royal Palace of Westminster: William Giffard to Winchester, Roger to Salisbury, Reynelm to Hereford, William Warelwast to Exeter and Urban to Llandaff. Roger of Salisbury is also appointed Justiciar in this year.

====== Europe ======
- Spring – Duke Bolesław III along with his ally King Coloman of Hungary, invades Bohemia in order to aid Duke Svatopluk in gaining the Bohemian throne. The Polish expedition is a complete success: on May 14 Svatopluk is installed as Duke of Bohemia in Prague. King Henry V demands tribute from Svatopluk as his overlord and vassal of the Holy Roman Empire.
- Autumn – King Sigurd I sails for the Holy Land with 60 ships (with some 5,000 men) on the first stage of the Norwegian Crusade to Palestine. Now 17, he is the first European king to support the Crusaders in the Levant. Sigurd leaves his older brother Eystein I to rule the kingdom in his absence – and visits England, France, Galicia and Sicily en route.
- October 9 – Bohemond I, prince of Antioch, lands with his army (some 34,000 men) in Epirus near Avlona. He plunders the countryside and marches to Dyrrhachium (modern Albania).
- November – Siege of Dyrrhachium: Bohemond I begins the siege of the Adriatic port city of Dyrrhachium held by its doux Alexios Komnenos.
- Winter – Bolesław III undertakes a punitive expedition against his half-brother Zbigniew with the help of Kievan and Hungarian allies.
- Saracen pirates raid the Benedictine monastery of Saint Honorat, on the Lérins Islands .

====== Levant ======
- June – Kilij Arslan I, sultan of Sultanate of Rum, conquers Mosul (during the Battle of Mosul). But he is defeated and killed by Seljuk forces under Muhammad I Tapar supported by the Ortoqids and Fakhr al-Mulk Radwan.
- The Crusaders under Tancred, prince of Galilee, recover the Cilician cities of Tarsus, Adana and Mamistra conquered by Emperor Alexios I 3-years ago (see 1104).
- Joscelin I, lord of Turbessel, is released by Ilghazi (the Artukid ruler of Mardin) for a ransom of 20,000 dinars and the promise of military aid.
- Emir Fadl ibn Rabi'ah is expelled by Toghtekin, ruler (atabeg) of Damascus in Syria (approximate date).

====== Asia ======
- August 9 – Emperor Horikawa dies after a 20-year reign and is succeeded by his 4-year-old son Toba as emperor of Japan.

==== By topic ====
====== Commerce ======
- Chinese authorities print paper money in three colors to thwart counterfeiting (approximate date).

====== Literature ======
- Emperor Hui Zong writes his Treatise on Tea, the most detailed description of the Song sophisticated style of tea ceremony.

=== 1108 ===
==== By place ====
====== Europe ======
- Spring – King Sigurd I sails from England, on the Norwegian Crusade to Palestine. He repels a Muslim fleet near the Tagus River, then attacks Sintra, Lisbon and Alcácer do Sal, and finally defeats a second Muslim fleet further south.
- May 29 – Battle of Uclés: Almoravid forces defeat the armies of Castile and León. The advance of the Reconquista is halted, and the Berbers re-capture the towns of Uclés, Cuenca, Huete and Ocaña. The Christians, many of nobility, are beheaded.
- July 29 – King Philip I dies at Melun, after a 48-year reign. He is succeeded by his son Louis VI, who, at the start of his rule, faces insurrections from feudal brigands and rebellious robber barons.
- September – Siege of Dyrrhachium: Italo-Norman forces under Bohemond I lift the siege due to illness and lack of supplies. Bohemond becomes a vassal of the Byzantine Empire by signing the Treaty of Devol.
- Autumn – The Principality of Nitra ceases to exist, after King Coloman of Hungary, deposes its last ruler, Álmos, duke of Croatia.
- The consuls of Bergamo are first mentioned, indicating that the city has become an independent commune in Lombardy (Northern Italy).

====== Levant ======
- Summer – Jawali Saqawa, Turkish ruler of Mosul, accepts a ransom of 30,000 dinar by Count Joscelin I and releases his cousin Baldwin II, count of Edessa, who is held as prisoner (see 1104).
- Baldwin I marches out against Sidon, with the support of a squadron of sailor-adventurers from various Italian cities. A Fatimid fleet from Egypt defeats the Italians in a sea-battle outside the harbour.

====== Asia ======
- The Taira and Minamoto clans join forces to rule Japan, after defeating the warrior monks of the Enryaku-ji temple near Kyoto. The Taira replace many Fujiwara nobles in important offices – while the Minamoto gain more military experience by bringing parts of Northern Honshu under Japanese control (approximate date).

==== By topic ====
====== Religion ======
- Chichester Cathedral is consecrated under Ralph de Luffa, bishop of Chichester, in England.
- Construction begins on the tower of Winchester Cathedral, building continues until 1120.
- Pistoia Cathedral in Italy is damaged by a severe fire.
- June 13 – Restored Ferentino Cathedral in Italy is consecrated.

=== 1109 ===
==== By place ====
====== Levant ======
- July 12 – Siege of Tripoli: After a 7-year siege (supported by the Genoese fleet), Tripoli falls to the Crusaders. Fakhr al-Mulk ibn Ammar, qadi of Tripoli, submits to Bertrand of Toulouse (the eldest son of Raymond IV). He establishes the County of Tripoli, the fourth Crusader state in the Middle East. Raymond's nephew William II Jordan dies of an arrow wound sustained during the siege, leaving Bertrand as its sole ruler.

====== Europe ======
- Summer – Almoravid emir Ali ibn Yusuf organizes a public ritual of penance (auto-da-fé) of the works of Al-Ghazali, in front of the Great Mosque of Cordoba.
- July 1 – Urraca of León becomes queen of León, Castile and Galicia after the death of her father, King Alfonso VI, making her the first European queen regnant. She marries Alfonso I.
- August 10 – Battle of Nakło: Bolesław III leads an expedition into Pomerania. He besieges the castle of Nakło and defeats a Pomeranian relief force.
- August 24
  - Siege of Głogów: German forces led by King Henry V besiege Głogów. He is forced to abandon the siege – due to attacks of Polish guerilla warriors.
  - Battle of Hundsfeld: Bolesław III defeats the imperial forces under Henry V at Hundsfeld. The Germans are ambushed by the Polish forces.
- The Almoravid army, led by Ali ibn Yusuf, fails to reconquer Toledo (lost in 1085).

==== By topic ====
====== Education ======
- Anselm of Laon, French monk and theologian, becomes chancellor of the cathedral at Laon (approximate date).

== Significant people ==
- Henry I of England
- Su Song
- Al-Mustazhir
- Berkyaruq

== Births ==
1100

- May 19 – Judith of Bavaria, duchess of Swabia (d. 1130)
- May 23 – Qin Zong, Chinese emperor (d. 1161)
- Achard of Saint Victor, Norman bishop (d. 1171)
- Adrian IV, pope of the Catholic Church (d. 1159)
- Albert I (the Bear), margrave of Brandenburg (d. 1170)
- Alexander III, pope of the Catholic Church (d. 1181)
- Anselm of Havelberg, German bishop (approximate date)
- Arnold I, archbishop of Cologne (approximate date)
- Bruno II of Berg, archbishop of Cologne (d. 1137)
- Eliza and Mary Chulkhurst, English conjoined twins (d. 1134)
- Elvira of Castile, queen consort of Sicily (approximate date)
- Gilbert de Clare, 1st Earl of Pembroke (d. 1148)
- Héloïse d'Argenteuil, French abbess and scholar (d. 1162)
- Herman of Carinthia, German astronomer (d. 1160)
- Hillin of Falmagne, archbishop of Trier (d. 1169)
- Jabir ibn Aflah, Arab astronomer and mathematician (d. 1150)
- John of Meda, Italian monk and abbot (d. 1159)
- Muhammad al-Idrisi, Almoravid geographer (d. 1165)
- Owain Gwynedd, Welsh king of Gwynedd (approximate date)
- Jacob ben Meir Tam, French Jewish rabbi (d. 1171)
- Robert de Beaumont, 2nd Earl Leicester (d. 1168)
- Robert de Ferrers, 2nd Earl of Derby (d. 1162)
- Robert of Melun, bishop of Hereford (d. 1167)
- Robert of Newminster, English abbot (d. 1159)
- Teobaldo Roggeri, Italian shoemaker (d. 1150)

1101

- September – Ibn Bashkuwal, Andalusian biographer (d. 1183)
- Abu al-Bayan ibn al-Mudawwar, Jewish physician (d. 1184)
- Arslan Shah I, Seljuk sultan of Kerman (d. 1142)
- Artaldus, bishop of Belly-Ars (d. 1206)
- Fujiwara no Tamako, Japanese empress consort (d. 1145)
- Helena of Skövde, Swedish noblewoman and saint (d. 1160)
- Stephen II, king of Hungary and Croatia (d. 1131), and his twin Ladislaus

1102

- February 7 – Matilda, Holy Roman Empress (d. 1167)
- October 25 – William Clito, count of Flanders (d. 1128)
- Chekawa Yeshe Dorje, Tibetan Buddhist monk (d. 1176)
- Eleanor of Champagne, French noblewoman (d. 1147)
- Gilla na Naemh Ua Duinn, Irish poet and writer (d. 1160)
- Henry II, margrave of the Northern March (d. 1128)
- Klængur Þorsteinsson, bishop of Skálholt (d. 1176)
- Liang Hongyu, Chinese general (d. 1135)
- Nerses IV, Catholicos of Armenia (d. 1173)
- Peter of Tarentaise, French abbot and bishop (d. 1174)
- Roger de Beaumont, 2nd Earl of Warwick (d. 1153)
- Zhu, Chinese empress of the Song Dynasty (d. 1127)

1103

- February 24 – Toba, emperor of Japan (d. 1156)
- March 24 – Yue Fei, Chinese general and poet (d. 1142)
- August 5 – William Adelin, duke of Normandy (d. 1120)
- Adeliza of Louvain, queen of England (d. 1151)
- Aénor de Châtellerault, duchess of Aquitaine (d. 1130)
- Alfonso I, count of Tripoli and Toulouse (d. 1148)
- Heilika of Lengenfeld, German countess (d. 1170)
- Henry II, margrave of the Saxon Ostmark (d. 1123)
- Rögnvald Kali Kolsson, Norwegian earl (d. 1158)
- Vsevolod of Pskov, Kievan prince (approximate date)
- Wivina, French Benedictine abbess (d. 1168)

1104

- Euphrosyne of Polotsk, Kievan princess (d. 1167)
- Fujiwara no Kiyosuke, Japanese waka poet (d. 1177)
- Gens du Beaucet, French hermit and saint (d. 1127)
- Ibn Zafar al Siqilli, Arab-Sicilian politician (d. 1170)
- Robert de Beaumont, 2nd Earl of Leicester (d. 1168)
- Vladimir Volodarevich, Galician prince (d. 1152)
- Waleran de Beaumont, 1st Earl of Worcester (d. 1166)

1105

- March 1 – Alfonso VII, king of León and Castile (d. 1157)
- March 14 – Drogo, Flemish hermit and saint (d. 1186)
- Alexander III, pope of the Catholic Church (d. 1181)
- Awn al-Din ibn Hubayra, Abbasid vizier (d. 1165)
- Basava, Indian philosopher and statesman (d. 1167)
- Fujiwara no Motohira, Japanese nobleman (d. 1157)
- Hu Hong, Chinese Confucian scholar (d. 1161)
- Ibn Asakir, Syrian historian and mystic (d. 1175)
- Ibn Tufail, Arab Andalusian polymath (d. 1185)
- John FitzGilbert, Marshal of England (d. 1165)
- Joseph Kimhi, Spanish Jewish rabbi (d. 1170)
- Lope Díaz I de Haro, Castilian nobleman (d. 1170)
- Mahmud II, sultan of the Seljuk Empire (d. 1131)
- Matilda I, Countess of Boulogne, queen consort of England (d. 1152)
- Maurice FitzGerald, Lord of Lanstephan, English nobleman (d. 1176)
- Melisende, queen consort of Jerusalem (d. 1161)
- Odo of Novara, Italian priest and saint (d. 1200)
- Serlo of Wilton, English poet and writer (d. 1181)
- Sophia of Bavaria, German noblewoman (d. 1145)
- Sophie of Winzenburg, German noblewoman (d. 1160)
- Władysław II the Exile, Polish nobleman (d. 1159)
- Xuedou Zhijian, Chinese Zen Buddhist monk (d. 1192)

1106

- Alexios Komnenos, Byzantine co-emperor (d. 1142)
- Celestine III, pope of the Catholic Church (d. 1198)
- David FitzGerald, bishop of St. Davids (d. 1176)
- Fujiwara no Michinori, Japanese nobleman (d. 1160)
- Hugh II, French nobleman (d. 1134)
- Hugh de Beaumont, 1st Earl of Bedford (d. 1141)
- Ibn Asakir, Syrian scholar and historian (d. 1175)
- Chŏng Chung-bu, Korean military leader (d. 1179)
- Magnus I, king of Sweden (d. 1134)
- Matilda of Anjou, duchess of Normandy (d. 1154)
- Minamoto no Yorimasa, Japanese military leader (d. 1180)
- Xing, Chinese empress (d. 1139)

1107

- June 12 – Gao Zong, Chinese emperor (d. 1187)
- Anthelm of Belley, French prior and bishop (d. 1178)
- Enrico Dandolo, doge of Venice (d.1205)
- Falaki Shirvani, Persian poet and writer (d. 1157)
- Kenkai, Japanese Shingon Buddhist monk (d. 1155)
- Stephen Kontostephanos, Byzantine general (d. 1149)
- William III, count of Nevers and Auxerre (d. 1161)

1108

- Andronikos Komnenos, Byzantine prince (d. 1142)
- Baldwin IV, count of Hainaut (d. 1171)
- Bohemond II, Italo-Norman prince of Antioch (d. 1130)
- Derbforgaill, Irish princess (d. 1193)
- Ghiyath ad-Din Mas'ud, Seljuk sultan (d. 1152)
- Henry X, duke of Bavaria (d. 1139)
- Leopold IV, duke of Bavaria (d. 1141)

1109

- July 25 – Afonso I, king of Portugal (d. 1185)
- September 7 – Gongye, Korean queen (d. 1183)
- October 29 – Injong of Goryeo, Korean king (d. 1146)
- Abu'l-Hasan al-Hasan ibn Ali, Zirid emir (d. 1171)
- Al-Rashid, caliph of the Abbasid Caliphate (d. 1138)
- Béla II, king of Hungary and Croatia (d. 1141)
- Bertrand de Blanchefort, French Grand Master (d. 1169)
- William d'Aubigny, 1st Earl of Arundel (d. 1176)

== Deaths ==
1100

- February 23 – Zhezong, Chinese emperor (b. 1077)
- February 25 – Gerland, bishop of Agrigento
- March 28 – Adelaide of Weimar-Orlamünde, German noblewoman
- July 18 – Godfrey of Bouillon, French nobleman (b. 1060)
- July 23 – Warner of Grez, French nobleman
- August 2 – William II (or William Rufus), king of England
- September 8 – Clement III, antipope of Rome
- September 16 – Bernold of Constance, German chronicler
- October 13 – Guy I, Count of Ponthieu (or Wido), French nobleman
- November 18 – Thomas of Bayeux, archbishop of York
- December 22 – Bretislav II, duke of Bohemia
- Abu al-Yusr al-Bazdawi, Hanafi-Maturidi scholar (b. 1030)
- Azzo of Gobatsburg, Swedish nobleman (approximate date)
- Geoffrey de Mandeville, Norman Constable of the Tower of London
- Geoffrey, Count of Conversano ("the elder"), Italo-Norman nobleman
- Jaya Pala, Indian ruler of the Kamarupa Kingdom (b. 1075)
- Qin Guan, Chinese poet and writer (approximate date)
- Qutb al-din Hasan, ruler (malik) of the Ghurid dynasty
- Robert de Stafford, Anglo-Norman nobleman (approximate date)

1101

- February 12 – Daozong of Liao, Chinese emperor (b. 1032)
- March 14 – Fujiwara no Morozane, Japanese nobleman (b. 1042)
- April 24 – Vseslav of Polotsk, Kievan prince
- May 16 – Liemar, archbishop of Bremen
- June 22 – Roger I, Norman nobleman
- July 27
  - Conrad II, king of Germany and Italy (b. 1074)
  - Hugh d'Avranches, Norman nobleman
- August 24 – Su Shi, Chinese statesman and poet (b. 1037)
- August 27 – Guillaume de Montfort, bishop of Paris
- September 7 – Geldemar Carpenel, French nobleman
- September 30 – Anselm IV, archbishop of Milan
- September – Ida of Formbach-Ratelnberg, Bavarian-born Margravine of Austria and crusader (k. in battle) (b. c.1055)
- October 5 – Uicheon, Korean Buddhist monk (b. 1055)
- October 6 – Bruno of Cologne, founder of the Carthusian Order (b. c.1030)
- October 18 – Hugh I, crusader, son of Henry I of France (b. 1057)
- November 6 – Welf I, Duke of Bavaria, German nobleman
- November 15 – Elvira of Toro, Leonese princess (b. 1038 or 1039)
- December 11 – Nikon the Dry, Kievan monk and hermit
- December 12 – Al-Musta'li, Fatimid caliph (b. 1074)
- Constantine Bodin, king of Duklja (approximate date)
- Egilbert, archbishop of Trier
- Geoffrey Burel of Amboise, French nobleman, crusader (k. in battle)
- Gilla na Naemh Ua Dunabhra, Irish chief poet
- Qingshui, Chinese Chan Buddhist monk (b. 1047)
- Su Song, Chinese statesman and scientist (b. 1020)
- Theodoric, antipope of the Catholic Church
- Urraca of Zamora, Leonese princess
- Walter of Albano, Italian cardinal-bishop
- Lady Six Monkey, queen of the Mixtec city State of Huachino and queen of Jaltepec (b. c. 1073)

1102

- April 9 – Raoul II, Norman nobleman (House of Tosny)
- May 19 – Stephen II, French nobleman and crusader
- June 4 – Władysław I Herman, duke of Poland
- July 29 – Albert III, count of Namur (House of Namur)
- November 1 – Anna Dalassena, Byzantine noblewoman
- Ermengol V, count of Urgell (b. 1078)
- Felicia of Sicily, queen of Hungary (approximate date)
- Fujiwara no Kanshi, Japanese empress (b. 1021)
- Giselbert II, count of Roussillon
- Guglielmo Embriaco, Genoese merchant (b. 1040)
- Hugh VI, French nobleman and crusader
- Khön Könchok Gyalpo, Tibetan Buddhist monk (b. 1034)
- Mahmud al-Kashgari, Turkish lexicographer (b. 1005)
- Maurice, cardinal-bishop of Porto
- Odo I, duke of Burgundy (b. 1060)
- Odon de Châtillon, cardinal-bishop of Ostia
- Stephen I, count palatine of Burgundy (b. 1065)
- Walter Giffard, 1st Earl of Buckingham
- Xiang, Chinese empress and regent (b. 1047)

1103

- January 17 – Frutolf of Michelsberg, German monk
- March 18 – Sybilla of Conversano, Norman duchess
- July 10 – Eric I, king of Denmark
- August 24 – Magnus III, king of Norway (b. 1073)
- October 19 – Humbert II, count of Savoy (b. 1065)
- Al-Hakim al-Munajjim, Persian Nizari missionary
- Boedil Thurgotsdatter, Danish queen
- Ebles II, French nobleman (House of Montdidier)
- Henry I, German nobleman (House of Wettin)
- Isaac Alfasi, Algerian Talmudist and posek (b. 1013)
- Manegold of Lautenbach, German priest (b. 1030)
- Osbern FitzOsbern, bishop of Exeter (b. 1032)
- Sibylla of Burgundy, duchess of Burgundy (b. 1065)
- William Firmatus, Norman hermit and pilgrim (b. 1026)

1104

- June 8 – Duqaq, Seljuk ruler of Damascus
- September 25 – Simon II, French nobleman
- October 26 – Johann I, bishop of Speyer
- Al-Mansur ibn al-Nasir, Hammadid ruler
- Danishmend Gazi, ruler of the Danishmends
- Ebontius, bishop of Barbastro
- Herewald of Llandaff, Welsh bishop
- Peter I, king of Aragon and Navarre
- Seraphin, archbishop of Esztergom
- Serlo, Norman cleric and abbot
- Sökmen, governor of Jerusalem
- Svend Tronkræver, Danish prince

1105

- February 28 – Raymond IV, French nobleman
- March 14 – Judith of Swabia, duchess of Poland (b. 1054)
- July 13 – Rashi, French Jewish rabbi and writer (b. 1040)
- November 10 – Sukjong, Korean ruler of Goryeo (b. 1054)
- Abu Esmail Moayed-o-din Togharayi, Seljuk poet (b. 1045)
- Barkiyaruq, sultan of the Seljuk Empire
- Dagobert of Pisa, Italian archbishop
- Gregory II, Armenian Catholicos
- Huang Tingjian, Chinese calligrapher and poet (b. 1045)
- Hugh of Fauquembergues, prince of Galilee (or 1106)
- Inge the Elder, king of Sweden (approximate date)
- Malik-Shah II, sultan of the Seljuk Empire
- María Rodríguez, countess of Barcelona (b. 1080)
- Peter of Anagni, Italian bishop and papal legate
- Richard II, prince of Capua (or 1106)
- Shōshi, Japanese empress consort (b. 1027)
- Simon of Hauteville, count of Sicily (b. 1093)

1106

- February 3 – Khalaf ibn Mula'ib, Uqaylid emir
- April 16 – Arnold I, Lotharingian nobleman
- May 1 – Conon, Lotharingian nobleman
- May 19 – Geoffrey IV, French nobleman
- June 16 – Benno, bishop of Meissen (b. 1010)
- June 24 – Yan Vyshatich, Kievan nobleman
- August 7 – Henry IV, Holy Roman Emperor (b. 1050)
- August 23 – Magnus, German nobleman (b. 1045)
- September 13 – Peter, French nobleman
- September 17 – Manasses II, archbishop of Reims
- October 7 – Hugh of Die, French bishop (b. 1040)
- Ali ibn Tahir al-Sulami, Syrian jurist and philologist
- Domnall Ua Conchobair, king of Connacht
- Gonzalo Núñez de Lara, Castilian nobleman
- Hugh of Fauquembergues, prince of Galilee (or 1105)
- Jikirmish, Seljuk ruler
- John of Lodi, Italian hermit and bishop (b. 1025)
- Li Gonglin, Chinese painter and antiquarian (b. 1049)
- Lothair Udo III, margrave of the Nordmark (b. 1070)
- Máel Muire mac Céilechair, Irish cleric and writer
- Minamoto no Yoshiie, Japanese samurai (b. 1039)
- Nathan ben Jehiel, Italian Jewish lexicographer
- Richard II, prince of Capua (or 1105)
- Yusuf ibn Tashfin, sultan of Morocco (b. 1009)

1107

- January 8 – Edgar, king of Scotland
- April 12 – Burchard, bishop of Basel
- May 24 – Raymond of Burgundy, count of Galicia
- August 9 – Horikawa, emperor of Japan (b. 1079)
- September 26 – Maurice, bishop of London
- Changlu Zongze, Chinese Chan Buddhist monk
- Cheng Yi, Chinese neo-confusian philosopher (b. 1033)
- Kilij Arslan I, sultan of the Sultanate of Rum (b. 1079)
- Mi Fu, Chinese painter, poet and calligrapher (b. 1051)
- Richard de Redvers, Norman warrior and nobleman
- Robert Fitzhamon, Norman warrior and nobleman
- Roger Bigod, Norman knight and nobleman

1108

- January 4 – Gertrude, Grand Princess of Kyiv
- March 18 – Abe no Munetō, Japanese samurai (b. 1032)
- May 21 – Gerard, Norman archbishop of York
- May 29
  - García Ordóñez, Castilian nobleman
  - Sancho Alfónsez, Castilian nobleman
- July 5 – Guy of Hauteville, Italo-Norman diplomat
- July 29 – Philip I, king of France
- November 15 – Enrico Contarini, bishop of Castello
- García Álvarez, Castilian official and military leader
- Gonzalo, bishop of Mondoñedo (approximate date)
- Gregory III, count of Tusculum (approximate date)
- Gundulf, bishop of Rochester (approximate date)
- Guy II, French nobleman and crusader
- Mafalda of Pulla-Calabria, Norman noblewoman (b. 1060)
- Urse d'Abetot, Norman sheriff of Worcestershire
- Veera Ballala I, Indian ruler of the Hoysala Empire
- Wang, Chinese empress of the Song Dynasty (b. 1084)

1109

- January 26 – Alberic of Cîteaux, French abbot
- April 14 – Fulk IV, count of Anjou (b. 1043)
- April 21 – Anselm, archbishop of Canterbury (b. 1033)
- April 28 – Hugh the Great, abbot of Cluny (b. 1024)
- May 12 – Dominic de la Calzada, Spanish priest (b. 1019)
- July 1 – Alfonso VI, king of León and Castile
- September 21 – Svatopluk, duke of Bohemia
- November 16 – Ingulf, Norman Benedictine abbot
- Eupraxia of Kiev, Holy Roman Empress
- Ngok Loden Sherab, Tibetan Buddhist monk (b. 1059)
- William II, count of Cerdagne and Tripoli
