= 1101 =

1101 in various calendars
- Gregorian calendar: 1101; MCI
- Ab urbe condita: 1854
- Armenian calendar: 550; ԹՎ ՇԾ
- Assyrian calendar: 5851
- Balinese saka calendar: 1022–1023
- Bengali calendar: 507–508
- Berber calendar: 2051
- English Regnal year: 1 Hen. 1 – 2 Hen. 1
- Buddhist calendar: 1645
- Burmese calendar: 463
- Byzantine calendar: 6609–6610
- Chinese calendar: 庚辰年 (Metal Dragon); 3798 or 3591 — to — 辛巳年 (Metal Snake); 3799 or 3592
- Coptic calendar: 817–818
- Discordian calendar: 2267
- Ethiopian calendar: 1093–1094
- Hebrew calendar: 4861–4862
- Hindu calendars
- Vikram Samvat: 1157–1158
- Shaka Samvat: 1022–1023
- Kali Yuga: 4201–4202
- Holocene calendar: 11101
- Igbo calendar: 101–102
- Iranian calendar: 479–480
- Islamic calendar: 494–495
- Japanese calendar: Kōwa 3 (康和３年)
- Javanese calendar: 1006–1007
- Julian calendar: 1101; MCI
- Korean calendar: 3434
- Minguo calendar: 811 before ROC 民前811年
- Nanakshahi calendar: −367
- Seleucid era: 1412/1413 AG
- Thai solar calendar: 1643–1644
- Tibetan calendar: ལྕགས་ཕོ་འབྲུག་ལོ་ (male Iron-Dragon); 1227 or 846 or 74 — to — ལྕགས་མོ་སྦྲུལ་ལོ་ (female Iron-Snake); 1228 or 847 or 75

Year 1101 (MCI) was a common year starting on Tuesday of the Julian calendar. It was the 2nd year of the 1100s decade, and the 1st year of the 12th century.

== Events ==
=== By place ===
==== Byzantine Empire ====
- Crusade of 1101 – A second wave of European crusaders attempts to cross Anatolia, to reach the Kingdom of Jerusalem. They are defeated by the Seljuk troops under Sultan Kilij Arslan I, at Heraclea. A handful of crusaders under Raymond IV of Toulouse manage to reach the Byzantine port of Bafra, at the mouth of the River Halys.
- Summer – The Byzantine fleet under Admiral Eustathios recaptures the ports of western Cilicia, Seleucia and Corycus. Eustathios extends his power over Cilician territory (belonging to Bohemond I) further east – occupying Tarsus, Adana and Mamistra.

==== Levant ====
- Spring – King Baldwin I concludes an alliance with the Genoese fleet, offering them commercial privileges and booty. He captures the towns of Arsuf and Caesarea. Baldwin's crusaders pillage Caesarea and massacre the majority of the local population.
- September 7 – Battle of Ramla: A Crusader force (some 1,100 men) under Baldwin I defeats the invading Fatimids at Ramla (modern Israel). Baldwin plunders the Fatimid camp and the survivors flee to Ascalon.

==== Europe ====
- June 22 – Roger I, count of Sicily, dies at Mileto in Calabria after a 30-year reign. He is succeeded by his 8-year-old son Simon of Hauteville, while his mother, Adelaide del Vasto, acts as his regent.
- Summer – Almoravid forces under Sultan Yusuf ibn Tashfin besiege Valencia, which is defended by Jimena Díaz, widow of Rodrigo Diaz de Vivar. The city holds out until May 1102.
- Autumn – Countess Mathilda of Tuscany leads a successful expedition in northern Italy and takes Ferrara.
- The county of Berg in Germany is established.

==== England ====
- February 3 – Ranulf Flambard, bishop of Durham, escapes from the Tower of London and flees to Normandy. There he joins Robert Curthose, duke of Normandy, who has just returned from the Crusades.
- July 20 – Robert Curthose lands at Portsmouth with an army in an effort to take the English throne from his younger brother, Henry I.
- August 2 – By the Treaty of Alton, ratified at Winchester, Robert abandons his claim to the throne, recognising Henry as King of England.

=== By topic ===
==== Culture ====
- A vast compilation of Liao, Korean, and Song Buddhist writings is completed (approximate date).

==== Religion ====
- Spring – Antipope Theodoric dies, the partisans of Emperor Henry IV choose Adalbert as the new antipope.
- April 19 – King Canute IV of Denmark is canonized as a saint under the name San Canuto.
- Fontevraud Abbey is founded by the French preacher Robert of Arbrissel.

== Births ==
- September – Ibn Bashkuwal, Andalusian biographer (d. 1183)
- Abu al-Bayan ibn al-Mudawwar, Jewish physician (d. 1184)
- Arslan Shah I, Seljuk sultan of Kerman (d. 1142)
- Artaldus, bishop of Belly-Ars (d. 1206)
- Fujiwara no Tamako, Japanese empress consort (d. 1145)
- Helena of Skövde, Swedish noblewoman and saint (d. 1160)
- Stephen II, king of Hungary and Croatia (d. 1131), and his twin Ladislaus

== Deaths ==
- February 12 – Daozong of Liao, Chinese emperor (b. 1032)
- March 14 – Fujiwara no Morozane, Japanese nobleman (b. 1042)
- April 24 – Vseslav of Polotsk, Kievan prince
- May 16 – Liemar, archbishop of Bremen
- June 22 – Roger I, Norman nobleman
- July 27
  - Conrad II, king of Germany and Italy (b. 1074)
  - Hugh d'Avranches, Norman nobleman
- August 24 – Su Shi, Chinese statesman and poet (b. 1037)
- August 27 – Guillaume de Montfort, bishop of Paris
- September 7 – Geldemar Carpenel, French nobleman
- September 30 – Anselm IV, archbishop of Milan
- September – Ida of Formbach-Ratelnberg, Bavarian-born Margravine of Austria and crusader (k. in battle) (b. c.1055)
- October 5 – Uicheon, Korean Buddhist monk (b. 1055)
- October 6 – Bruno of Cologne, founder of the Carthusian Order (b. c.1030)
- October 18 – Hugh I, crusader, son of Henry I of France (b. 1057)
- November 6 – Welf I, Duke of Bavaria, German nobleman
- November 15 – Elvira of Toro, Leonese princess (b. 1038 or 1039)
- December 11 – Nikon the Dry, Kievan monk and hermit
- December 12 – Al-Musta'li, Fatimid caliph (b. 1074)
- Constantine Bodin, king of Duklja (approximate date)
- Egilbert, archbishop of Trier
- Geoffrey Burel of Amboise, French nobleman, crusader (k. in battle)
- Gilla na Naemh Ua Dunabhra, Irish chief poet
- Qingshui, Chinese Chan Buddhist monk (b. 1047)
- Su Song, Chinese statesman and scientist (b. 1020)
- Theodoric, antipope of the Catholic Church
- Urraca of Zamora, Leonese princess
- Walter of Albano, Italian cardinal-bishop
- Lady Six Monkey, queen of the Mixtec city State of Huachino and queen of Jaltepec (b. c. 1073)
