= 1105 =

1105 in various calendars
- Gregorian calendar: 1105; MCV
- Ab urbe condita: 1858
- Armenian calendar: 554; ԹՎ ՇԾԴ
- Assyrian calendar: 5855
- Balinese saka calendar: 1026–1027
- Bengali calendar: 511–512
- Berber calendar: 2055
- English Regnal year: 5 Hen. 1 – 6 Hen. 1
- Buddhist calendar: 1649
- Burmese calendar: 467
- Byzantine calendar: 6613–6614
- Chinese calendar: 甲申年 (Wood Monkey); 3802 or 3595 — to — 乙酉年 (Wood Rooster); 3803 or 3596
- Coptic calendar: 821–822
- Discordian calendar: 2271
- Ethiopian calendar: 1097–1098
- Hebrew calendar: 4865–4866
- Hindu calendars
- Vikram Samvat: 1161–1162
- Shaka Samvat: 1026–1027
- Kali Yuga: 4205–4206
- Holocene calendar: 11105
- Igbo calendar: 105–106
- Iranian calendar: 483–484
- Islamic calendar: 498–499
- Japanese calendar: Chōji 2 (長治２年)
- Javanese calendar: 1010–1011
- Julian calendar: 1105; MCV
- Korean calendar: 3438
- Minguo calendar: 807 before ROC 民前807年
- Nanakshahi calendar: −363
- Seleucid era: 1416/1417 AG
- Thai solar calendar: 1647–1648
- Tibetan calendar: ཤིང་ཕོ་སྤྲེ་ལོ་ (male Wood-Monkey); 1231 or 850 or 78 — to — ཤིང་མོ་བྱ་ལོ་ (female Wood-Bird); 1232 or 851 or 79

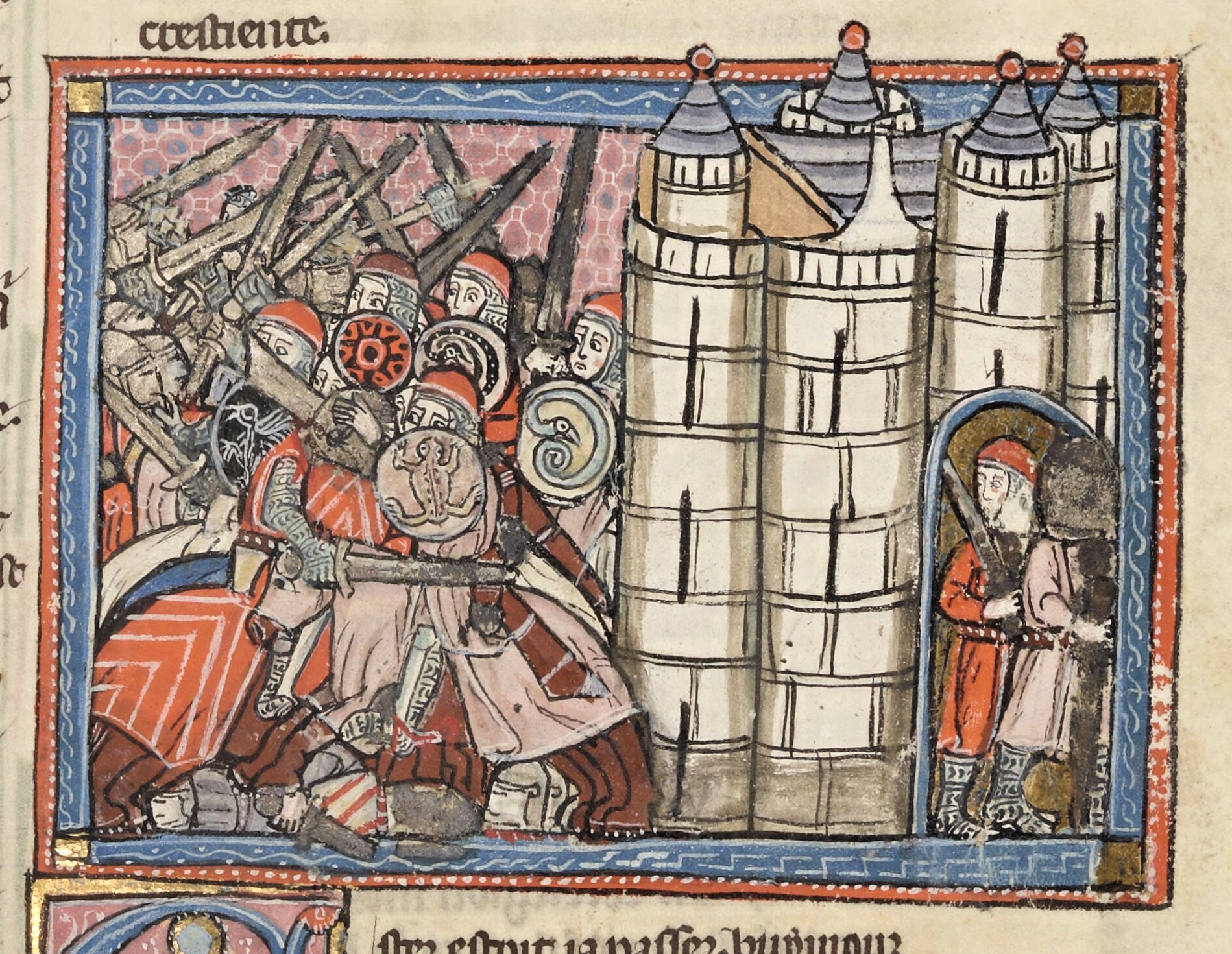
Baldwin I defeats the Fatimids (1105).

Year 1105 (MCV) was a common year starting on Sunday of the Julian calendar.

== Events ==
=== By place ===
==== Levant ====
- February 28 – Raymond IV dies at his castle of Mons Peregrinus ("Pilgrim's Mountain") near Tripoli. Raymond leaves his 2-year-old son Alfonso I by his third wife, Elvira of Castile, to rule the County of Tripoli. Raymond's nephew William-Jordan, count of Cerdagne, becomes regent over Alfonso. Bertrand, the eldest son of Raymond, inherits the title 'Count of Toulouse'.
- April 20 – Battle of Artah: The Crusaders under Tancred, Norman prince and regent of Antioch, defeat a Seljuk army (some 7,000 men) at Artah (modern-day Reyhanlı). Tancred threatens Aleppo, capital of Sultan Fakhr al-Mulk Radwan, and expands his conquest by conquering more territory east of the Orontes River with minor opposition.
- August 27 – Battle of Ramla: The Crusaders under King Baldwin I defeat a Fatimid expeditionary force (some 15,000 men) at Ramla. Baldwin pillages the enemy camp – but does not further pursue the Fatimids. The battle ends in the last large-scale attempt of the Fatimids to reconquer Palestine.

==== Europe ====
- The Almoravid emir, Yusuf ibn Tashfin, sends a maritime expedition to Palestine from Sevilla to ward off the Crusaders and perhaps to reconquer Jerusalem. The fleet of about seventy ships rushes into a storm in the Mediterranean Sea, and is never seen again.
- Bohemond I, Norman prince of Antioch, arrives in Apulia (Southern Italy) after an absence of 9 years. He travels to Rome and meets Pope Paschal II. His cousin, Roger II becomes count of Sicily.
- Autumn – Bohemond I and papal legate Bruno travel to the north of France and visit the court of King Philip I ("the Amorous"). Bohemond gets permission to recruit men throughout the kingdom.
- Inge the Elder dies and is succeeded by his nephew Philip as ruler of Sweden. He and his brother Inge the Younger rule the kingdom together (until the death of Philip in 1118).
- December 31 – Henry IV, Holy Roman Emperor, is deposed by his son Henry V (who is king of Germany). Henry is forced to resign his crown and is imprisoned in the castle of Böckelheim.

==== England ====
- Summer – King Henry I invades Normandy, takes Bayeux (after a short siege) and Caen. He advances on Falaise, and starts inconclusive peace negotiations with Duke Robert II. Henry withdraws to deal with political issues at home.
- Henry I meets Anselm, archbishop of Canterbury, under threat of excommunication at L'Aigle in Normandy to settle their disputes that has led to Anselm's exile from England (see 1103).

==== Seljuk Empire ====
- Sultan Barkiyaruq dies in Borujerd (modern Iran) after a 13-year reign. He is succeeded by his son Malik-Shah II, but is deposed and killed by his uncle Muhammad I. Muhammad becomes ruler of the Seljuk Empire, but his brother Ahmad Sanjar (Seljuk ruler of Khorasan) holds more power as co-ruler.
- Autumn – Kilij Arslan I, sultan of the Sultanate of Rum, leads a Seljuk expedition to take over Melitene (modern Turkey). He attempts to capture Edessa, but the Crusader fortress is too strongly defended by its garrison. Kilij Arslan then moves on to Harran, which surrenders to him.

==== Asia ====
- The Tamna Kingdom is annexed by the Korean Goryeo Dynasty.

=== By topic ===
==== Religion ====
- Winter – Sylvester IV is elected as antipope in Rome by members of the Roman aristocracy, with support of Henry V.

== Births ==
- March 1 – Alfonso VII, king of León and Castile (d. 1157)
- March 14 – Drogo, Flemish hermit and saint (d. 1186)
- Pope Alexander III of the Catholic Church (d. 1181)
- Awn al-Din ibn Hubayra, Abbasid vizier (d. 1165)
- Basava, Indian philosopher and statesman (d. 1167)
- Fujiwara no Motohira, Japanese nobleman (d. 1157)
- Hu Hong, Chinese Confucian scholar (d. 1161)
- Ibn Asakir, Syrian historian and mystic (d. 1175)
- Ibn Tufail, Arab Andalusian polymath (d. 1185)
- John FitzGilbert, Marshal of England (d. 1165)
- Joseph Kimhi, Spanish Jewish rabbi (d. 1170)
- Lope Díaz I de Haro, Castilian nobleman (d. 1170)
- Mahmud II, sultan of the Seljuk Empire (d. 1131)
- Matilda I, Countess of Boulogne, queen consort of England (d. 1152)
- Maurice FitzGerald, Lord of Lanstephan, English nobleman (d. 1176)
- Melisende, queen consort of Jerusalem (d. 1161)
- Odo of Novara, Italian priest and saint (d. 1200)
- Serlo of Wilton, English poet and writer (d. 1181)
- Sophia of Bavaria, German noblewoman (d. 1145)
- Sophie of Winzenburg, German noblewoman (d. 1160)
- Władysław II the Exile, Polish nobleman (d. 1159)
- Xuedou Zhijian, Chinese Zen Buddhist monk (d. 1192)

== Deaths ==
- February 28 – Raymond IV, French nobleman
- March 14 – Judith of Swabia, duchess of Poland (b. 1054)
- July 13 – Rashi, French Jewish rabbi and writer (b. 1040)
- November 10 – Sukjong, Korean ruler of Goryeo (b. 1054)
- Abu Esmail Moayed-o-din Togharayi, Seljuk poet (b. 1045)
- Barkiyaruq, sultan of the Seljuk Empire
- Dagobert of Pisa, Italian archbishop
- Gregory II, Armenian Catholicos
- Huang Tingjian, Chinese calligrapher and poet (b. 1045)
- Hugh of Fauquembergues, prince of Galilee (or 1106)
- Inge the Elder, king of Sweden (approximate date)
- Malik-Shah II, sultan of the Seljuk Empire
- María Rodríguez, countess of Barcelona (b. 1080)
- Peter of Anagni, Italian bishop and papal legate
- Richard II, prince of Capua (or 1106)
- Shōshi, Japanese empress consort (b. 1027)
- Simon of Hauteville, count of Sicily (b. 1093)
