= 1106 =

1106 in various calendars
- Gregorian calendar: 1106; MCVI
- Ab urbe condita: 1859
- Armenian calendar: 555; ԹՎ ՇԾԵ
- Assyrian calendar: 5856
- Balinese saka calendar: 1027–1028
- Bengali calendar: 512–513
- Berber calendar: 2056
- English Regnal year: 6 Hen. 1 – 7 Hen. 1
- Buddhist calendar: 1650
- Burmese calendar: 468
- Byzantine calendar: 6614–6615
- Chinese calendar: 乙酉年 (Wood Rooster); 3803 or 3596 — to — 丙戌年 (Fire Dog); 3804 or 3597
- Coptic calendar: 822–823
- Discordian calendar: 2272
- Ethiopian calendar: 1098–1099
- Hebrew calendar: 4866–4867
- Hindu calendars
- Vikram Samvat: 1162–1163
- Shaka Samvat: 1027–1028
- Kali Yuga: 4206–4207
- Holocene calendar: 11106
- Igbo calendar: 106–107
- Iranian calendar: 484–485
- Islamic calendar: 499–500
- Japanese calendar: Chōji 3 / Kajō 1 (嘉承元年)
- Javanese calendar: 1011–1012
- Julian calendar: 1106; MCVI
- Korean calendar: 3439
- Minguo calendar: 806 before ROC 民前806年
- Nanakshahi calendar: −362
- Seleucid era: 1417/1418 AG
- Thai solar calendar: 1648–1649
- Tibetan calendar: ཤིང་མོ་བྱ་ལོ་ (female Wood-Bird); 1232 or 851 or 79 — to — མེ་ཕོ་ཁྱི་ལོ་ (male Fire-Dog); 1233 or 852 or 80

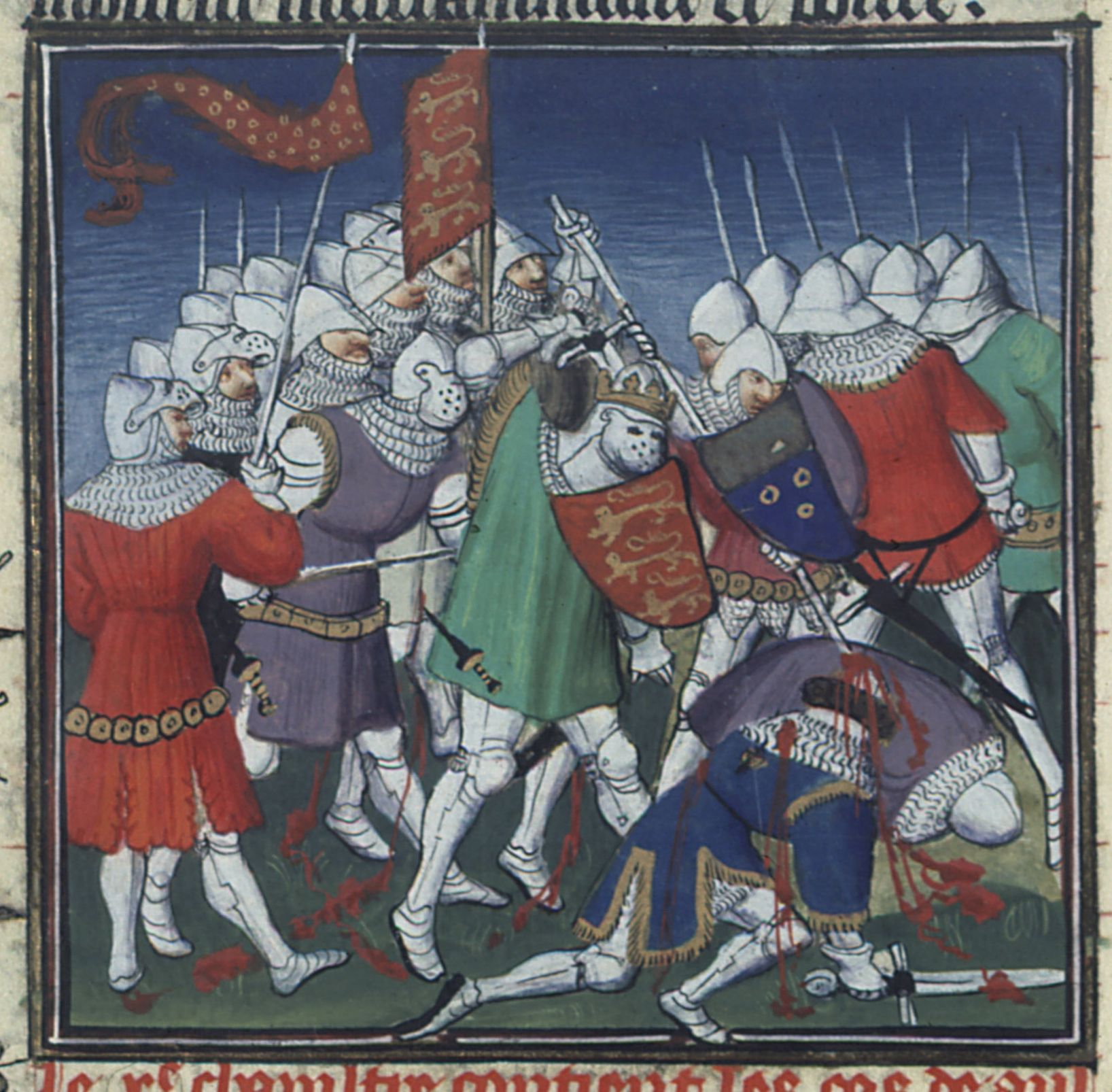
Medieval picture of Battle of Tinchebray

Year 1106 (MCVI) was a common year starting on Monday the Julian calendar.

== Events ==
=== By place ===
==== Europe ====
- Spring – Bohemond I, prince of Antioch, marries Constance of France (daughter of King Philip I) in the cathedral of Chartres. Philip agrees to marry his second daughter, the 9-year-old Cecile of France, to Tancred (nephew of Bohemond). Meanwhile, Bohemond mobilises an expeditionary force (some 30,000 men) to begin a campaign against Emperor Alexios I.
- August 7 – Emperor Henry IV escapes his captors at Ingelheim. He enters into negotiations at Cologne with English, French and Danish noblemen, and begins to collect an army to oppose his son Henry V but dies at Liège after a 49-year reign. Henry leads a successful expedition against Count Robert II of Flanders and is forced to swear his allegiance to him.
- September 28 – Battle of Tinchebray: King Henry I defeats and imprisons his older brother Robert II, duke of Normandy, in Devizes Castle. Edgar Atheling (uncle of Henry's wife) and the 3-year-old William Clito, son of Robert, are also taken prisoner. Henry places his nephew William in the custody of Helias of Saint-Saens, count of Arques.
- Autumn – Bohemond I returns to Apulia (Southern Italy) with an expeditionary force to prepare an offensive against the Byzantines. He is accompanied by his newlywed wife Constance (who is pregnant by him) and followers.
- Sultan Yusuf ibn Tashfin dies after a 45-year reign. He is succeeded by his 22-year-old son Ali ibn Yusuf as ruler of the Almoravid Empire. Ali appoints his brother Tamin ibn Yusuf as governor of Al-Andalus (modern Spain).
- Bolesław III, duke of Poland, begins a civil war against his half-brother Zbigniew, for control over Lesser Poland and Silesia.
- The city of Balaguer (located in Catalonia) is conquered from the Moors by Ermengol VI, count of Urgell.

==== Britain ====
- Roger le Poer, bishop of Salisbury, is granted land in south Wales by Henry I. He starts the construction of Kidwelly Castle on the banks of the river Gwendraeth.
- Magnus Erlendsson becomes Earl of Orkney (until 1115).

=== By topic ===
==== Astronomy ====
- February 2 – A comet (the Great Comet of 1106) is seen and reported by several civilisations around the world. Lasting for 40 days, the comet grows steadily in brightness until finally fading away.

== Births ==
- Alexios Komnenos, Byzantine co-emperor (d. 1142)
- Celestine III, pope of the Catholic Church (d. 1198)
- David FitzGerald, bishop of St. Davids (d. 1176)
- Fujiwara no Michinori, Japanese nobleman (d. 1160)
- Hugh II, French nobleman (d. 1134)
- Hugh de Beaumont, 1st Earl of Bedford (d. 1141)
- Ibn Asakir, Syrian scholar and historian (d. 1175)
- Chŏng Chung-bu, Korean military leader (d. 1179)
- Magnus Nielsen, king of Västergötland (d. 1134)
- Matilda of Anjou, duchess of Normandy (d. 1154)
- Minamoto no Yorimasa, Japanese military leader (d. 1180)
- Xing, Chinese empress (d. 1139)

== Deaths ==
- February 3 – Khalaf ibn Mula'ib, Uqaylid emir
- April 16 – Arnold I, Lotharingian nobleman
- May 1 – Conon, Lotharingian nobleman
- May 19 – Geoffrey IV, French nobleman
- June 16 – Benno, bishop of Meissen (b. 1010)
- June 24 – Yan Vyshatich, Kievan nobleman
- August 7 – Henry IV, Holy Roman Emperor (b. 1050)
- August 23 – Magnus, German nobleman (b. 1045)
- September 13 – Peter, French nobleman
- September 17 – Manasses II, archbishop of Reims
- October 7 – Hugh of Die, French bishop (b. 1040)
- Ali ibn Tahir al-Sulami, Syrian jurist and philologist
- Domnall Ua Conchobair, king of Connacht
- Gonzalo Núñez de Lara, Castilian nobleman
- Hugh of Fauquembergues, prince of Galilee (or 1105)
- Jikirmish, Seljuk ruler
- John of Lodi, Italian hermit and bishop (b. 1025)
- Li Gonglin, Chinese painter and antiquarian (b. 1049)
- Lothair Udo III, margrave of the Nordmark (b. 1070)
- Máel Muire mac Céilechair, Irish cleric and writer
- Minamoto no Yoshiie, Japanese samurai (b. 1039)
- Nathan ben Jehiel, Italian Jewish lexicographer
- Richard II, prince of Capua (or 1105)
- Yusuf ibn Tashfin, sultan of Morocco (b. 1009)
