= 1160 =

1160 in various calendars
- Gregorian calendar: 1160; MCLX
- Ab urbe condita: 1913
- Armenian calendar: 609; ԹՎ ՈԹ
- Assyrian calendar: 5910
- Balinese saka calendar: 1081–1082
- Bengali calendar: 566–567
- Berber calendar: 2110
- English Regnal year: 6 Hen. 2 – 7 Hen. 2
- Buddhist calendar: 1704
- Burmese calendar: 522
- Byzantine calendar: 6668–6669
- Chinese calendar: 己卯年 (Earth Rabbit); 3857 or 3650 — to — 庚辰年 (Metal Dragon); 3858 or 3651
- Coptic calendar: 876–877
- Discordian calendar: 2326
- Ethiopian calendar: 1152–1153
- Hebrew calendar: 4920–4921
- Hindu calendars
- Vikram Samvat: 1216–1217
- Shaka Samvat: 1081–1082
- Kali Yuga: 4260–4261
- Holocene calendar: 11160
- Igbo calendar: 160–161
- Iranian calendar: 538–539
- Islamic calendar: 554–555
- Japanese calendar: Heiji 2 / Eiryaku 1 (永暦元年)
- Javanese calendar: 1066–1067
- Julian calendar: 1160; MCLX
- Korean calendar: 3493
- Minguo calendar: 752 before ROC 民前752年
- Nanakshahi calendar: −308
- Seleucid era: 1471/1472 AG
- Thai solar calendar: 1702–1703
- Tibetan calendar: ས་མོ་ཡོས་ལོ་ (female Earth-Hare); 1286 or 905 or 133 — to — ལྕགས་ཕོ་འབྲུག་ལོ་ (male Iron-Dragon); 1287 or 906 or 134

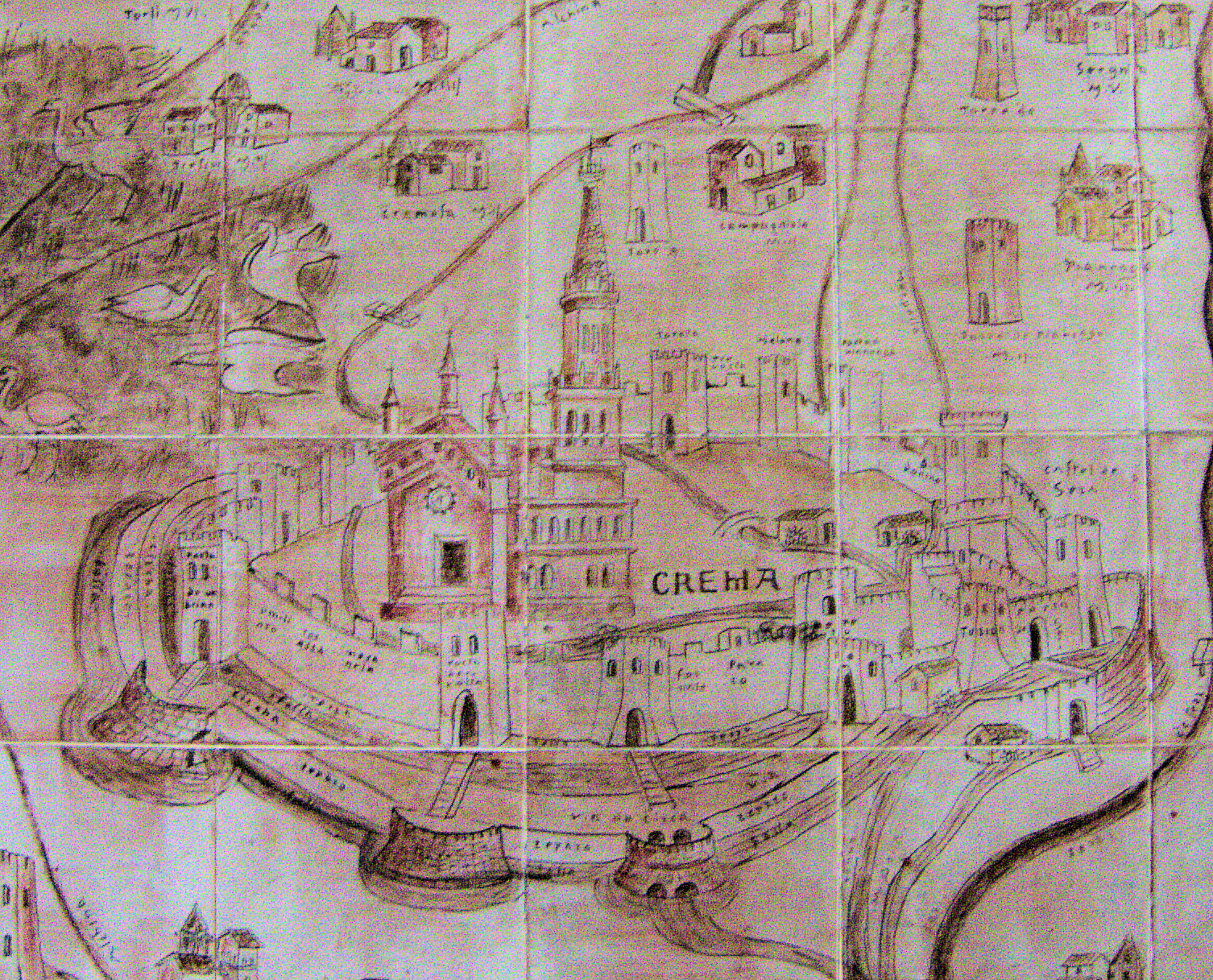
The Comune of Crema (15th century)

Year 1160 (MCLX) was a leap year starting on Friday of the Julian calendar.

== Events ==
=== By place ===
==== Byzantine Empire ====
- Spring – Emperor Manuel I Komnenos sends an embassy led by John Kontostephanos to Jerusalem, to ask King Baldwin III to nominate one of the princesses of the Crusader states, as a bride for the widowed emperor. Their two candidates are 15-year-old Maria of Antioch, and Melisende of Tripoli. Baldwin suggests Melisende, and her brother Count Raymond III sets about gathering an enormous dowry. The ambassadors are not satisfied, and delay the marriage for over a year. They hear rumours about Melisende's birth, based on her mother's (Countess Hodierna of Jerusalem) infidelity, and therefore Melisende's possible illegitimacy. In the end, the Emperor marries Maria in 1161 and Melisende eventually enters a convent.

==== Europe ====
- January 25 – Frederick Barbarossa, Holy Roman Emperor, captures Crema, Lombardy after a 6-month siege, as part of his campaign against the independent Italian city-states. Some 20,000 survivors are allowed to leave the city with whatever they could carry before Crema is looted and burnt to the ground. The expense of the siege (over 2,000 silver marks) and Frederick's determination to enforce it over the winter, demonstrates his ability to hold troops in the field and to keep his allies on side.
- May 18 – Erik IX Jedvardsson of Sweden is murdered, after which his murderer Magnus Henriksen proclaims himself king of Sweden as Magnus II. He is murdered in turn the following year, however. Erik is soon worshipped as a saint. Though never formally canonized by Pope Alexander III, he eventually becomes the patron saint of Sweden.
- November 2 – Betrothal of 5-year-old Henry the Young King of England and 2-year-old Marguerite, daughter of Louis VII of France; she brings Norman Vexin to the English crown as a dowry.
- November 13 – Within weeks of the death of his second wife, Queen Constance of Castile, King Louis VII of France marries Adela of Champagne, daughter of Count Theobald II ("the Great").
- A plot of land at Miholjanec is donated to the Knights Templar, who build a monastery in nearby Zdelia. This is the earliest historical mention of the Templars in Croatia and Hungary.
- Spital am Semmering (modern Austria) is founded by Margrave Ottokar III. He erects a hospital and completes the colonization of the area around the Traisen and Gölsen rivers.
- A large Portuguese offensive begins in the Alentejo region, against the Almoravids. The city of Tomar is founded by Gualdim Pais, Grand Master of the Knights Templar.
- The island of Lundy is granted to the Knights Templar by Henry II of England.

==== Levant ====
- Autumn – Raynald of Châtillon, prince of Antioch, makes a plundering raid in the valley of the Euphrates at Marash to seize cattle, horses and camels from the local peasants. On his way back to Antioch, he and his retinue are attacked by Zangid warriors. Raynald is unhorsed, captured and sent to Aleppo where he is put in jail.

==== Africa ====
- The Almohads conquer Mahdia (modern Tunisia) from the Normans after an important naval success near the city, against Christian reinforcements coming from Sicily.
- Approximate date – A commercial treaty between the Almohad Caliphate and the Republic of Pisa opens the North African ports to Tuscan merchants.

==== Asia ====
- In Japan, the Heiji Rebellion began with the siege of the Sanjō Palace.
- Emperor Dharanindravarman II dies and is succeeded by his cousin Yasovarman II as ruler of the Khmer Empire (modern Cambodia). Dharanindravarman's son Jayavarman VII goes into exile in neighboring Champa.

=== By topic ===
==== Education ====
- Approximate date – Derby School is founded by Walkelin de Derby in Derby (England); it will survive until 1989.

== Births ==
- October 4 – Alys of France, daughter of Louis VII (d. 1220)
- December 3 – Conrad of Querfurt, German bishop (d. 1202)
- Abu Yusuf Yaqub al-Mansur, Almohad caliph (d. 1199)
- Adolf III, count of Schaumburg and Holstein (d. 1225)
- Alice of Courtenay, French noblewoman (d. 1218)
- Ali ibn al-Athir, Arab historian and biographer (d. 1233)
- Azriel of Gerona, Catalan Jewish leader (d. 1238)
- Beatrice of Viennois, countess of Savoy (d. 1230)
- Bertold V, German nobleman (House of Zähringen) (d. 1218)
- Cadenet, French poet and troubadour (approximate date)
- David Kimhi, French rabbi and grammarian (d. 1235)
- Dulce of Aragon, queen of Portugal (d. 1198)
- Eschiva of Ibelin, queen of Cyprus (d. 1196)
- Eudokia Komnene, French noblewoman (d. 1203)
- Hartmann I, count of Württemberg (d. 1240)
- Isaac the Blind, French rabbi and writer (d. 1235)
- John of Hexham, English chronicler (d. 1209)
- John of Matha, French priest and saint (d. 1213)
- Konoe Motomichi, Japanese nobleman (d. 1233)
- Ma Yuan, Chinese landscape painter (d. 1225)
- Mestwin I, duke of Pomerania (approximate date)
- Parisius (or Parisio), Italian priest and saint (d. 1267)
- Philip the Chancellor, French theologian (d. 1236)
- Rudolph I, count palatine of Tübingen (d. 1219)
- Sasaki Takatsuna, Japanese samurai (d. 1214)
- Sibylla (or Sibylle), queen of Jerusalem (d. 1190)
- Siraj al-Din al-Sakaki, Persian scholar (d. 1229)
- Taira no Koremori, Japanese general (d. 1184)
- Taira no Noritsune, Japanese nobleman (d. 1185)
- Tamar the Great, queen of Georgia (approximate date)
- Vladislaus III, duke of Bohemia (approximate date)

== Deaths ==
- March 12 – Al-Muqtafi, caliph of the Abbasid Caliphate (b. 1096)
- April 3 – William FitzAlan, Breton nobleman (b. 1105)
- April 27 – Rudolf I, count of Bregenz and Chur (b. 1081)
- May 18
  - Erik IX Jedvardsson ("the Holy"), king of Sweden (b. 1120)
  - Ibn al-Qalanisi, Arab politician and chronicler
- May 31 – Mechtildis of Edelstetten, German abbess
- July 23 – Al-Fa'iz bi-Nasr Allah, Fatimid caliph (b. 1149)
- October 4 – Constance of Castile, queen of France (b. 1141)
- December 17 – Gilla na Naemh Ua Duinn, Irish poet (b. 1102)
- December 22 – Fujiwara no Nariko, Japanese empress (b. 1117)
- Dharanindravarman II, Cambodian ruler of the Khmer Empire
- Fujiwara no Michinori, Japanese nobleman (b. 1106)
- Fujiwara no Nobuyori, Japanese nobleman (b. 1133)
- Gonzalo Fernández de Traba, Galician nobleman
- Helena of Skövde, Swedish noblewoman and saint
- Herman III, Margrave of Baden ("the Great"), German nobleman (b. 1105)
- Herman of Carinthia, German astronomer (b. 1100)
- Hugh Candidus, English monk and historian (b. 1095)
- Ibn Quzman, Andalusian poet and writer (b. 1087)
- Mahsati, Persian female poet and writer (b. 1089)
- Minamoto no Tomonaga, Japanese samurai (b. 1144)
- Minamoto no Yoshihira, Japanese nobleman (b. 1140)
- Minamoto no Yoshitomo, Japanese general (b. 1123)
- Niklot, Obotrite prince (House of Mecklenburg) (b. 1090)
- Peter Lombard, French bishop and theologian (b. 1096)
- Philip of France, French prince and archdeacon (b. 1132)
- Raymond du Puy, French knight and Grand Master (b. 1083)
- Robert I (Nostell), Norman churchman and prior (b. 1100)
- Sophie of Winzenburg, German noblewoman (b. 1105)
