= 1100s =

1100s may refer to:

- The century from 1100 to 1199, almost synonymous with the 12th century (1101–1200)
- 1100s (decade), the period from 1100 to 1109
