= Al-Safadi =

Turkic Mamluk author and historian

Khalīl ibn Aybak al-Ṣafadī, or Ṣalaḥ al-Dīn al-Ṣafadī (Arabic: صلاح الدين الصَّفديّ; full name - Ṣalaḥ al-Dīn Abū al-Ṣafa Khalīl ibn Aybak ibn ‘Abd Allāh al-Albakī al-Ṣafari al-Damascī Shafi'i. (1296 – 1363) was a Turkic Mamluk author and historian. He studied under the historian and Shafi'i scholar, al-Dhahabi.

He was born in Safad, Palestine under Mamluk rule. His wealthy family afforded him a broad education, memorising the Quran and reciting the books of Hadith. He excelled in the social sciences of grammar, language, philology and calligraphy. He painted on canvas, and was especially passionate about literature. He taught himself poetry, its systems, transmitters and meters.

== His teachers ==
Among Ṣafadī’s many teachers from Safad, Damascus, Cairo and Aleppo were:

- Al-Ḥāfīz Fatḥ al-Dīn ibn Sayyid al-Nās (d.734AH / 1333), with whom he studied literature in Cairo.
- Ibn al-Nabatah Muḥammad ibn Muḥammad al-Farqī al-Maṣrī (d.768AH / 1367)
- Abū Hayyan al-Gharnatī (d.745AH / 1345); with whom he studied grammar and philology.
- Maḥmūd ibn Salmān Ibn Fahd (d.725AH / 1325-26), author of Ḥusn al-tawassul ilá ṣināʻat al-tarassul (حسن التوسل إلى صناعة الترسل) and narrated much of his poetry.
- Judge Badr al-Dīn ibn Jamāt, Muḥammad ibn Ibrāhīm ibn Sa’d al-Kattanī (d. 733AH / 1333-34).
- Taqi al-Din al-Subki (d.756AH / 1356-57)
- The Ḥadīth Abū Al-Nūn Yūnus ibn Ibrāhīm al-Dabusi (d.729AH / 1329-30)
- Hafiz Jamal al-Din Yusuf ibn Abd al-Rahman al-Mizzi (d.742AH / 1342), and studied by the Ḥadīth in Dar al-Hadith Ashrafieh in Damascus.
- Al-Ḥafiz Shams al-Dīn Aḥmad ibn Muḥammad ibn Uthman al-Dhahabī (d.749AH / 1347-48); with whom he studied the Hadith and history.

== Books ==
- Ikhtirāʿ al-Khurāʿ ("Invention of Absurdity"); on scholastic pedantry, a satirical work in the tradition of Arabic parodies, it is one of his most famous works.
- Kitāb al-Wāfī bi-l-Wafayāt (كتاب الوافي بالوفيات) (29 vols.); biographical dictionary of notable people.
- Nakt al-Humyān fī Nukat al-Umyān, biographies of notable blind people, with a section on the causes of blindness.
- Al-Ghayth al-Musajam fi Sharh Lamiyyat-Ajam (Flowing Desert Rains in the Commentary upon the L-Poem of the Non-Arabs); an encyclopedic commentary on Togharayi's Lamiyyat al-Ajam.
- al-Ḥusn aṣ-ṣarīḥ fī miʾat malīḥ ('Pure Beauty: on one hundred handsome lads'), also a solo-authored maqāṭīʿ-collection composed between 1337 and 1338
- Al-Rawḍ al-bāsim wa-l-ʿarf an-nāsim ('The Smiling Garden and the Wafting Fragrance'), a 444-poem solo-authored maqāṭīʿ-collection in forty-six chapters composed sometime before 1355
- Alḥān as-sawājiʿ bayn al-bādī wa-l-murājiʿ ('Tunes of Cooing Doves, between the Initiator and Responder [in Literary Correspondence]'), an epistolary anthology
- Kashf al-ḥāl fī waṣf al-khāl ('Revealing the Situation about Describing Beauty Marks')
- Rashf al-zulāl fī waṣf al-hilāl ('A Sip of Pure Water: describing the crescent moon')
- Ladhdhat al-samʿ fī waṣf al-dam ('Pleasing the Ears by Describing the Tears'), also known as Kitāb Tashnīf as-samʿ bi-nsikāb ad-damʿ

== Notes ==
The Internet Archive hosts a copy of كتاب الوافي بالوفيات (Kitab Al-Wafi Bi-Al-Wafayat) at https://archive.org/details/FP49931.
