= Richard de Redvers =

Richard de Redvers may refer to:

- Richard de Redvers (died 1107)
- Richard de Redvers, 2nd Earl of Devon (died 1162)
- Richard de Redvers, 4th Earl of Devon (died 1193)
