= Herewald of Llandaff =

Welsh bishop (died 1104)

Herewald (died 1104) was a Welsh bishop of Llandaff, who had spent much of his time in England.

== Life ==
According to the Book of Llandaff, Herewald was elected in 1056 bishop of Llandaff by Gruffydd ap Llywelyn, Meurig ab Hywel and others, and was consecrated by Joseph, the bishop of St David's. The consent of the English authorities was obtained in 1059, when at the Whitsuntide gemot, held at Westminster, Archbishop Kinsi of York (in the absence of Stigandl) confirmed Herewald's appointment in the presence of Edward the Confessor. Ralph de Diceto states, however, that Herewald was consecrated by Lanfranc at Canterbury in 1071. The Canterbury Rolls speak of William the Conqueror investing Herewald, and of Lanfranc consecrating him. The Oxford Dictionary of National Biography suggests, in the context of a dispute of the 12th century between the diocese of Llandaff and the diocese of St David's, that none of these details of his consecration can be treated as certain.

During Herewald's episcopate, Glamorgan was conquered by Robert Fitzhamon and the Normans. Towards the end of his life he seems to have been suspended by Archbishop Anselm. He died on 6 March 1104.

== Notes ==
Attribution

This article incorporates text from a publication now in the public domain: Stephen, Leslie; Lee, Sidney, eds. (1891). "Herewald". Dictionary of National Biography. Vol. 26. London: Smith, Elder & Co.
