= Treaty of Alton =

1101 agreement between King Henry I of England and Robert Curthose, Duke of Normandy

The Treaty of Alton was an agreement signed in 1101 between Henry Beauclerc and his older brother Robert Curthose in which Robert agreed to recognize Henry as the king of England in exchange for a yearly stipend and other concessions. The agreement temporarily ended a crisis in the succession of the Anglo-Norman kings.

King William II of England died in a hunting accident in 1100. His elder brother, Robert Curthose, had at one point been acknowledged as his heir presumptive. Robert's absence in the First Crusade at the time of William's death, as well as his poor reputation among the Anglo-Norman barons, allowed the youngest brother, Henry Beauclerc, to claim the throne with popular support. Robert returned from the Holy Land after Henry's coronation. Encouraged by his advisor Ranulf Flambard, he invaded the Kingdom of England in order to claim the throne. He landed secretly at Portsmouth and was met by Henry at the town of Alton. Henry had solidified his popularity with the nobles and the Church by his issuance of the Charter of Liberties, however, and his popularity allowed him to resist Robert's invasion.

The dispute was settled diplomatically. In the Treaty of Alton, Robert agreed to renounce his claim to the English throne in exchange for a yearly stipend of 3,000 marks and the concession of all but one of Henry's possessions in the Duchy of Normandy. Robert and his followers were allowed to return to Normandy without reprisal from Henry. The two brothers moreover agreed to name each other as heirs and to assist each other in the punishment of traitors. The agreement was not long-lasting. In 1105, Henry invaded Normandy and defeated his brother's army the following year at the Battle of Tinchebray. Robert was imprisoned and died in captivity in 1134. Normandy remained a possession of the English crown for over a century afterwards.
