= Peter of Dammartin =

Count of Dammartin

Pierre (Peter) (died 13 September 1106), Count of Dammartin, son of Hugh I, Count of Dammartin, and Rohese de Bulles. Pierre, a descendant of Robert the Pious, was the last of the Counts of Dammartin from the bloodline of his grandfather Manasses. Pierre was an advocate of the Priory of Saint-Leu d’Esserent and sold the vineyards of Dammartin to the priory in 1104. Hugh married Eustachie of an unknown family and they had one son Hugh II, Seigneur de Dammartin. Pierre was succeeded as count by his sister's husband Aubry de Mello.

== Sources ==
- Mathieu, J. N., Recherches sur les premiers Comtes de Dammartin, Mémoires publiés par la Fédération des sociétés historiques et archéologiques de Paris et de l'Ile-de-France, 1996
