= John of Lodi =

Italian Roman Catholic saint (1025–1106)

Saint John of Lodi

Bishop of Gubbio
- Born: Lodi Vecchio, Italy
- Died: 1106; Gubbio, Italy
- Venerated in: Catholic Church
- Feast: 7 September

John of Lodi (1025–1106) was an Italian hermit and bishop.

John was born in Lodi Vecchio in 1025. In the 1060s, he became a hermit at the Camaldolese monastery of Fonte Avellana. He became a disciple and the personal secretary of Peter Damian, who was the prior of Fonte Avellana. After Damian's death in 1072, John wrote a biography of Peter Damian (1076-1082).

John later became prior of Fonte Avellana (1082-1084, and again 1100–1101). In 1104, he became Bishop of Gubbio, and held this office until his death.
