= Walter of Albano =

11th and 12th century cardinal and papal legate to England

Orders
- Created cardinal: 1091

Personal details
- Born: Gualterio
- Died: 1101

Walter or Gualterio of Albano (died 1101) was the cardinal-bishop of the Diocese of Albano in Italy from 1091 to 1101. He served as papal legate to England in May 1095, where he secured the recognition of Pope Urban II by King William II of England. He also brought a pallium, the symbol of an archbishop's authority, to the newly elected Archbishop of Canterbury, Anselm of Canterbury.

== Early career ==
Walter was appointed a cardinal by Urban in 1091 and was one of Urban's supporters in the papal curia.

In 1095, the papacy was disputed between two claimants, Clement III and Urban. King William had not recognized either, but Anselm, prior to his election as archbishop, had recognized Urban, and wished to go to Urban to receive his pallium. William would not allow Anselm to go to Rome nor acknowledge any pope until the king had chosen which pope to recognize, and called the Council of Rockingham to persuade Anselm to wait, but the council did not settle matters to the king's satisfaction. In order to resolve the situation without relinquishing his royal right to choose, the pope acknowledged by England, the king sent two clerks to Rome to negotiate with Urban about English recognition and the pallium for Anselm. They set out after the Council in February 1095, and returned to England with Walter by 13 May 1095.

== Legate in England ==
Walter did not meet with Anselm when he landed at Dover, instead going directly to meet the king. Walter was authorized to give the king "all that he wanted" in return for William's recognition of Urban. The king's chief negotiator was William de St-Calais, the Bishop of Durham. The medieval writer Hugh of Flavigny said that Walter expressly conceded that no more papal legates would be sent to England without William's permission, for the length of William's life. Papal approval of the king's acts in the dispute was also granted. William then attempted to get the legate to depose Anselm, but was unsuccessful. Hugh also accused Walter of taking a bribe and attempting to get Anselm to swear fealty to the pope and Saint Peter. In the end, a compromise was reached, which limited the ability of the papacy to interfere in the English Church in exchange for the king's recognition of Urban.

When time came to give Anselm his pallium, the first suggestion that the king give it to Anselm (Note: For the broader context of the royal right to invest prelates with their insignia, see Investiture Controversy, which came to a head in the English investiture controversy of 1103 to 1107.) was rejected by the archbishop, and a compromise was reached where Walter put the pallium on the high altar at Canterbury Cathedral on 27 May 1095, and Anselm took the pallium from the altar. Walter remained in England to collect Peter's Pence, a traditional payment from the English bishoprics to the papacy. Anselm and the legate did not get along well from the start, for Walter said that Anselm's election as archbishop had been made by schismatics, throwing doubt on Anselm's fitness. Relations between Walter and Anselm were further strained later in the summer when the legate wrote a letter to Anselm relaying some accusations against the archbishop made by some of the English bishops. Although Walter attempted to discuss church reform with Anselm, Anselm gave the excuse that because an invasion from Robert Curthose was expected, the archbishop was unable to talk with the legate due to Anselm's military obligations. Another reason Anselm gave was that nothing could be done about a church council in England without the king's approval.

== Later career ==
Walter left England sometime in the summer or autumn of 1095. He took with him to Rome a letter from Anselm and a small gift for Urban. He was in Rome on 14 August 1099, and probably helped elect Pope Pascal II on 13 August 1099. He died in 1101.
