= Artaldus =

French Roman Catholic saint

Saint Artaldus
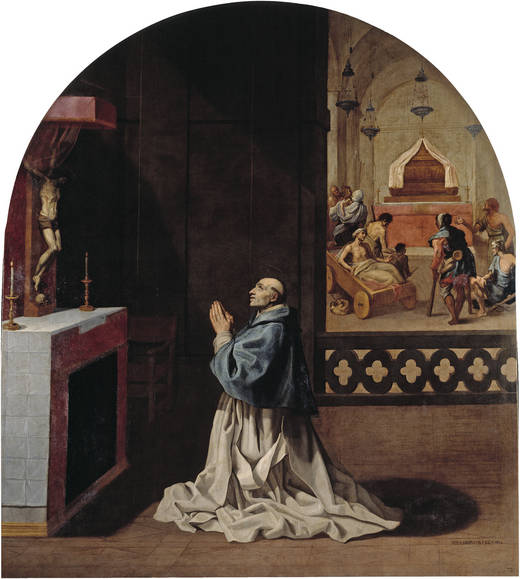

Bishop of Belley
- Born: 1101; Sothonod, Savoy, France
- Died: 1206 (aged 104 – 105); Lochieu, France
- Venerated in: Roman Catholic Church
- Canonized: Cultus confirmed 1834 by Pope Gregory XVI
- Feast: 7 October

Artaldus, also known as Arthaud, was a 13th-century Carthusian Bishop of Belley.

== Early life ==
Born in the castle of Sothonod in Savoy, in 1101. Much of his childhood is not known but at the age of eighteen, Artaldus entered the court of Duke Amadeus III, but after a year or so he left to become a priest.

== Early religious life ==
Artaldus entered the Carthusian house of Portes Charterhouse in modern-day Bénonces. There he was ordained a priest. He spent many years serving as a priest before being sent by the prior of the Grande Chartreuse to found a charterhouse near a valley in the Valromey, a place that was known as "the cemetery". Artaldus decided to take with him six fellow priests from the Portes Charterhouse to establish this new community. The community had to move when the newly built charterhouse buildings were ravaged by fire. Artaldus chose a fresh site on the Arvières River, and the Arvières Charterhouse was founded and dedicated to Our Lady, in 1132.

== Appointment as Bishop of Belley ==
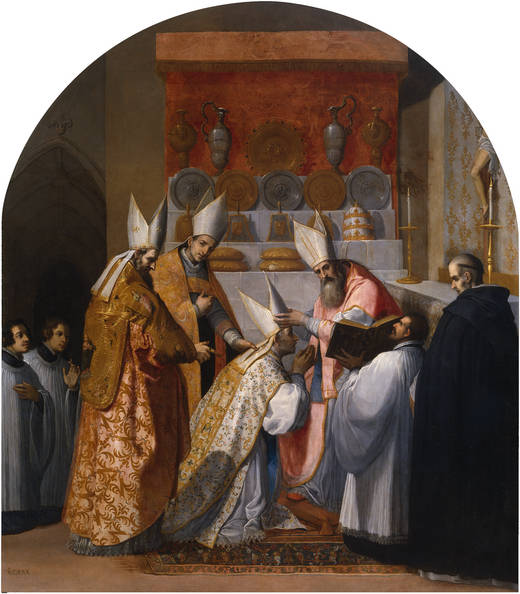
Consecration

In the years spent at Arvière, Artaldus gained considerable fame and a great reputation, like that of St. Bruno, his master. Similar to St. Bruno, Artaldus was called from his monastery, to accept the role of serving as a bishop. This was at the See of Belley. Artaldus, who was over eighty when called to the post, less than two years later he resigned and returned to Arvières.

== Later life and death ==
In his later years Artaldus was visited by Hugh of Lincoln, who had convinced King Henry II of England to become a benefactor of the charterhouse at Arvières. Artaldus who live the remainder of his days at Arvières, living until the age of 105, he died in 1206. His cultus was confirmed in 1834, by Pope Gregory XVI.
