= Odo of Novara =

12th-century beatified Italian Carthusian priest

Blessed Odo of Novara O. Cart.
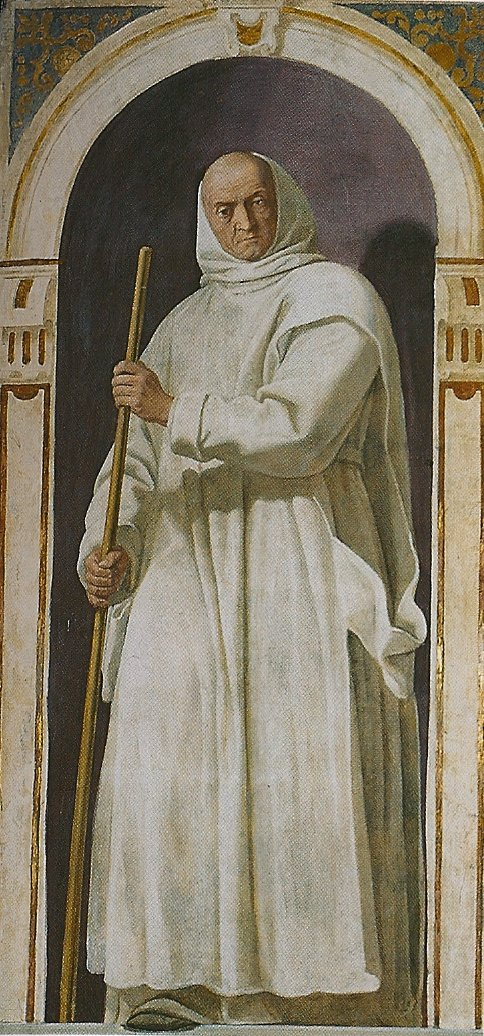
- Painting - Daniele Crespi (1629).

Priest
- Born: c. 1105; Novara, Duchy of Milan
- Died: 14 January 1200 (aged 94); Tagliacozzo, Papal States
- Venerated in: Roman Catholic Church
- Beatified: 31 May 1859, Saint Peter's Basilica, Papal States by Pope Pius IX
- Feast: 14 January
- Attributes: Carthusian habit; Staff

Odo of Novara (c. 1105 – 14 January 1200) was an Italian Catholic priest and a professed member of the Carthusians.

Pope Pius IX confirmed his beatification in mid-1859.

== Life ==
He was born in Novara around 1105 and was appointed as the prior of Geirach Charterhouse in Slovenia in 1189. But he experienced difficulties with Dietrich, the local bishop, who persecuted him. Odo went to Rome in 1190 to request Pope Clement III to relieve him of his office.

He became a chaplain after his resignation at a convent in Tagliacozzo. Odo died there in 1200, aged 95.

=== Beatification ===
A process of investigation into his manner of life was initiated at the request of Pope Gregory IX. The Bishop of Trivento Riccardo described Odo as a "God-fearing man, modest and chaste, given up day and night to watching and prayer, clad only in rough garments of wool, living in a tiny cell ... obeying always the sound of the bell when it called him to office".
