= Nikon the Dry =

Nikon the Dry was an 11th-century monk at the Kiev Pechersk Lavra in Kievan Rus'. He was captured and enslaved by the Polovtsians, enduring brutal captivity for more than three years. He eventually gained his freedom, allegedly through a miracle. Therefore, he was later canonised as a saint in the Eastern Orthodox Church and Eastern Catholic Churches.

Nikon, before his freedom was gained, informed his enslaver that Jesus would release him from bondage in three days. As a consequence, his enslaver crippled Nikon's legs so that he could no longer walk. According to legend, three days later, Nikon was carried by God to Kiev unseen. Sometime later, Nikon's former master encountered the holy man in the city. The man repented of his former ways was baptised, and became a disciple of Nikon.

Nikon was referred to as "the Dry" due to his intense practice of fasting.

Nikon the Dry died in 1101 and is commemorated on the date of his passing to eternity, 11 December, in the Eastern Orthodox and Byzantine Rite Catholic Churches.

== See also ==
- Hermit
- Daniel the Stylite
