= Ali ibn Tahir al-Sulami =

Late–11th century Philologist and Jurist

Ali ibn Tahir al-Sulami (died 1106) was a Damascene jurist and philologist who was the first to preach jihad against the crusaders in the aftermath of the First Crusade.

al-Sulami recognized the Crusaders as Franks whereas his most of his contemporaries thought the Christians were Eastern Romans trying to re-capture their lost territories since the Siege of Jerusalem (636–637).

In 1105 al-Sulami published his treatise, Kitab al-Jihad ("Book of Struggle" or "Book of Jihad"), and preached his ideas from the Great Mosque in Damascus. He recognized the dangers of the Christian invaders connected with the ongoing Christian reconquests of Sicily and Spain. He believed that Muslims had abandoned jihad and other religious duties, and argued that the caliphs were supposed to make war on the Christians once a year, something they had not done for many years. God, he claimed, was now punishing Muslims for their sins. In order to defeat the crusaders, al-Sulami argued that Muslims must practise the inner jihad so that they could successfully undertake the jihad against the enemy. His message was mostly ignored, as Muslim rulers would not merge the concept of jihad with military expeditions until later in the 12th century under Nur ad-Din Zangi and Saladin.

Only two manuscripts of the Kitab survive, both incomplete, and both in Damascus.
