= Gilla na Naemh Ua Duinn =

Gilla na Naemh Ua Duinn or Gillananaemh O'Duinn (1102 – 17 December 1160) was an Irish poet, historian, and cleric.

== Life ==
He was born in 1102 and belonged to a tribe which possessed, from the eleventh century to the reign of James VI and I, the district now called Dooregan, from their tribe-name of Ui Riaccain, and the Irish word duthaidh, inheritance. They were one of the septs of the old Irish kingdom of Ui Failghe, now Offaly; the present barony of Tinahinch, Queen's County, includes their territory, where many of them still remain under the anglicised names of Dunn, O'Dunn, and Doyne. Gillananaemh became chief poet of the king of Leinster, and composed historical poems of the same character as those of Flann Mainistrech and of Gilla Cómáin mac Gilla Samthainde.

He died on the island of Lough Ree, co. Longford, called Inchcleraun, on 17 December 1160.

== Works ==
Five poems undoubtedly his are extant:

- Of 328 verses, beginning Aibhinn sin Eire ard: a chrich mac Miledh morgarg (Oh! pleasant noble Ireland: land of the sons of valiant Milesius). This celebrates the Milesian conquest; and a copy made in 1712 by the welt-known scribe Seon Mac Solaidh is extant, as well as one in the Cambridge University Library of earlier date.
- Of 280 verses on the kings of Leinster, beginning Coigeadh Laighean na leacht an riogh (Fifth of Ireland, Leinster of the tombs of the kings). There is a copy in the Book of Ballymote, a manuscript of the fifteenth century.
- Of 128 verses on the tribes descended from Colla Meann, Colla Uais, and Colla Dachrioch, the three sons of Cairbre Lifechair, king of Ireland. It begins Airghialla a hEamhain Macha (Oh ! men of Oriel, from the Navan fort). A copy made in 1708 by James Maguire was in the collection of Edward O'Reilly.
- Of 296 verses on the kings of Connaught, beginning Findaidh seanchaidhe fir Fan (Witness the historians of the men of Ireland), There is a copy in the Cambridge University Library.
- Of 296 verses on the kings of Connaught, beginning, Cruacha Conacht rath co raith (Rathcroghan, prosperous earthwork), There is a copy in the Book of Ballymote.

The libraries of the Royal Irish Academy and of Trinity College, Dublin, contain in their Irish manuscript collections further copies of these poems, and of others written by him.

== In the Annals ==
The Annals of the Four Masters describe him as:

"lector of Inis-Clothrann, a paragon in history and poetry, and a good speaker, sent his spirit to his heavenly patrimony, amid a choir of angels, on the 17th of December, in the fifty-eighth year of his age."

Inis Clothran is an island located in the northern part of Lough Ree, on the River Shannon. It contains the remains of a monastery of which Ua Duinn was lector.
