= Saint Drogo =

Flemish saint

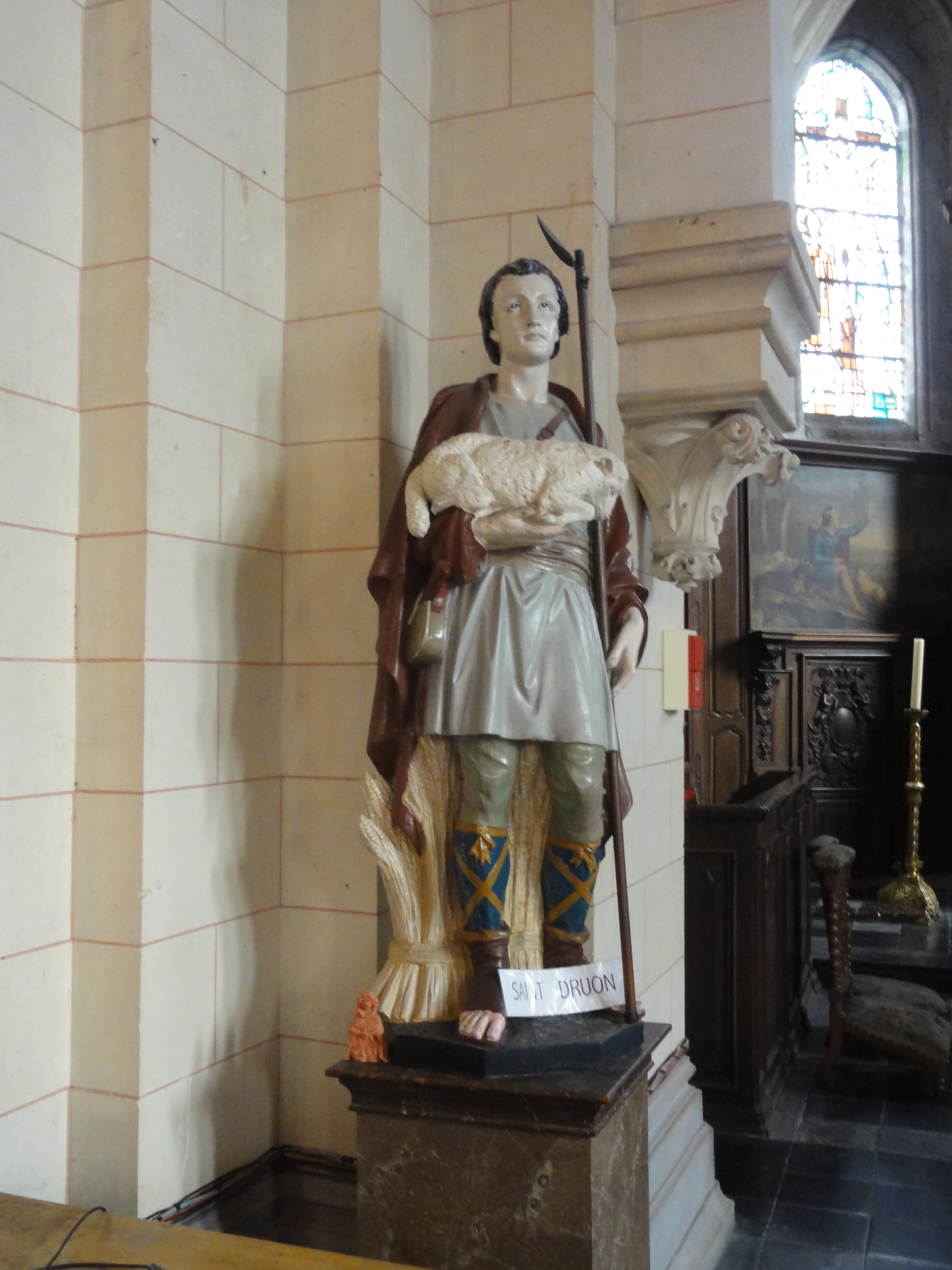

Anchorite
- Born: March 14, 1105; Epinoy
- Died: c. April 16, 1186; Sebourg, France
- Venerated in: Catholic Church
- Canonized: pre-congregation
- Major shrine: St. Martin Church, Lower Side Chapel, Sebourg, France
- Feast: April 16, the same day on which he died in 1186
- Attributes: Benedictine with sheep, shepherd
- Patronage: Baume-les-Messieurs, coffee house keepers, coffee house owners, deaf people, Fleury-sur-Loire, gall stones, hernias, illness, insanity, mental illness, mentally ill people, midwives, mute people, muteness, mutes, orphans, ruptures, sheep, shepherds, sick people, sickness, cattle, unattractive people

Drogo of Sebourg (March 14, 1105 – April 16, 1186), also known as Druon, Dreux, Dron, Droon, and Drogon, is a Flemish saint. He was born in Epinoy, County of Artois in the French part of the County of Flanders, and died in Sebourg, France. He is known as the patron saint of shepherds and coffee, and his feast day is on April 16.

== Life ==
Saint Drogo was born into a noble family in Epinoy-Sebourg, France. His father died before he was born, and his mother died in childbirth, leaving the newborn an orphan. He was raised by his relatives and at the age of ten was grieved to learn the circumstances of his birth. At twenty years of age, he gave his money and goods to the poor, renouncing his estates in favor of the next heirs to live a life of poverty and penance.

He then set out, and after having visited several holy places was hired as a shepherd by a wealthy woman named Elizabeth de la Haire at Sebourg, two leagues from Valenciennes. The retirement and solitude were most agreeable to him, on account of the opportunities they made for prayer. For six years Drogo kept sheep, busying himself with practices of prayer and penance. He was a skilled shepherd who could read the weather and knew how to cure the animals of their ills. He shared these skills with others. Despite his relative obscurity, his charity and spirit of devotion and prayer gained him the esteem and affection of all, particularly Elizabeth de la Haire. Many made him presents: but these he bestowed on the poor. It was rumored he had the gift of bilocation and would be seen in the fields and in church simultaneously. This gave rise to a common adage among the rural folk of that region, "I'm not Saint Drogo; I can't ring the church bell for Mass and be in the procession!"

To avoid the danger of praise and admiration, at length he left his place, and went on pilgrimages. He is said to have journeyed to Rome nine times, as well as visiting the main shrines of France and Italy en route. From time to time he returned to Sebourg.

At length, a hernia stopped his pilgrimages, so he built himself a small cell against the wall of the church. The cell had a window to the outside for limited contact to receive food and water from those seeking his prayers and counsel. A second window opened into the church so he could follow the liturgies and receive Communion. Here he lived as an anchorite for 45 years until he died in 1186, at the age of eighty-one.

== Veneration ==
"At Sebourg in Hainaut, around 1186, Saint Druon (Drogon). In search of a simple and solitary life, as a shepherd of flocks and then as a pilgrim, he lived for God alone" (Roman Martyrology). His feast day is April 16.

At his death, people from Épinoy claimed the body despite the protests of those in Sebourg, who wished to honor him as they had in life. However, the farther the cart with the body drove from the church, the heavier it grew until it could go no farther. Taking this as a heavenly sign, Drogo's body was returned to Sebourg. A cross marks the spot where the cart had stopped.

The relics of Saint Drogo (Druon) are in the Church of Saint Martin in Sebourg. In 1609, Bishop Richardot formally recognized the cult of Saint Drogo by "raising the relics" to the altar, thus approving veneration. There is an annual procession of Drogo's relics in Sebourg each Trinity Sunday. He is a patron saint of shepherds.

Although Drogo is now regarded by some as the patron saint of coffee, this patronage is anachronistic. There is no evidence that a pilgrim from Flanders in the 12th century had any connection to a drink associated with Ethiopia and the Middle East in the 15th century. Author Mark Pendergrast stated in the book Uncommon Grounds: "Though Rhazes and Avicenna may have been writing about some form of coffee, they were not describing our brew. It probably wasn't until sometime in the fifteenth century that someone roasted the beans, ground them and made an infusion."
