= Abu Esmail Moayed-o-din Togharayi =

Iranian poet and scholar

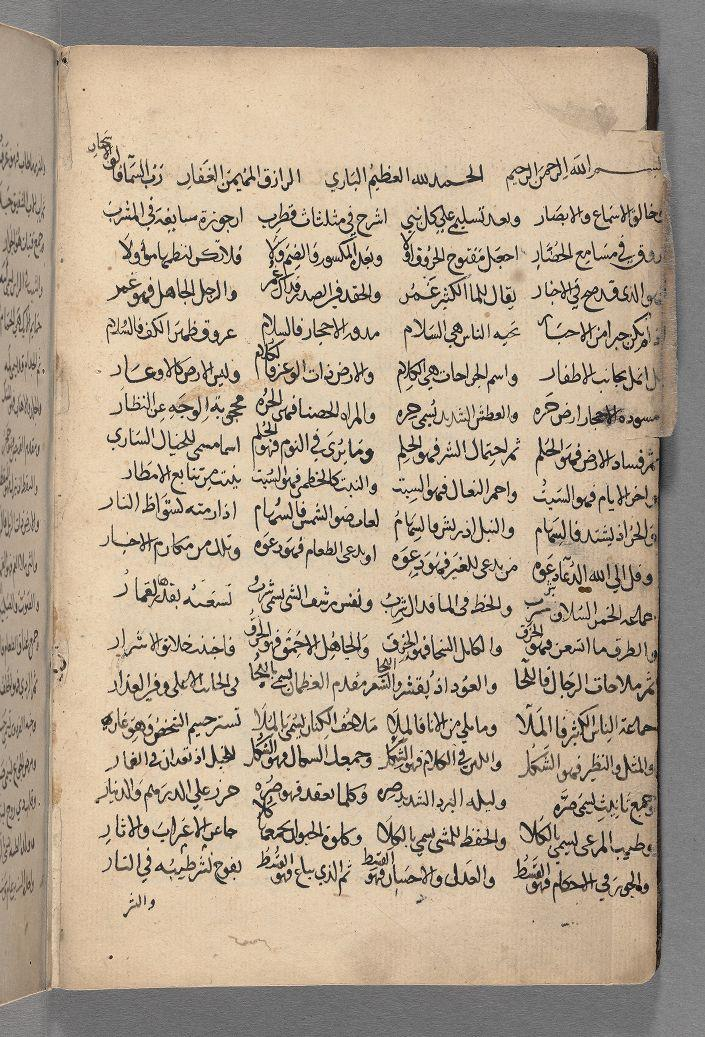
Lamiyat al-Ajam

Abu Esmail Moayed-o-din Hosein-ebn-e-ali Esfahani Togharayi (Persian: ابواسماعیل موید الدین حسین ابن علی اصفهانی طغرایی) was a Persian poet and scholar of the Seljuq period. He was born in Isfahan, Iran in 1045 A.D.

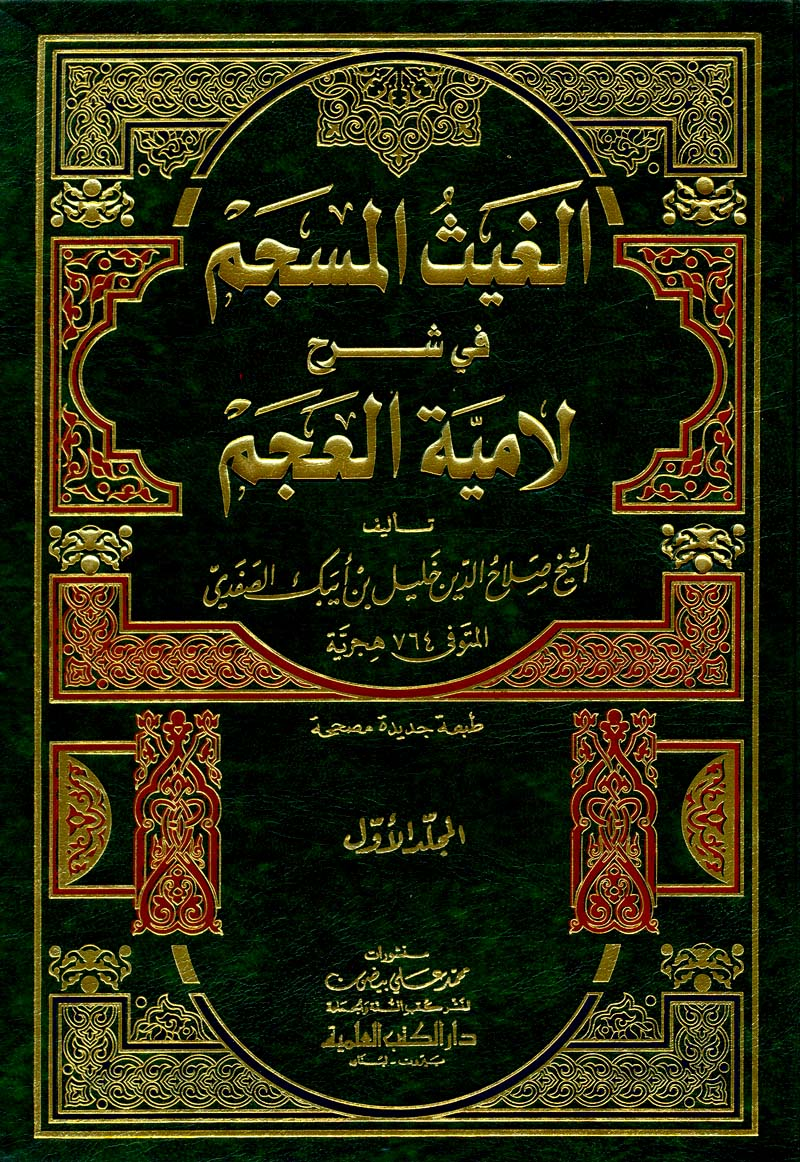
Al-Safadi's commentary on Lamiyat al-Ajam

He had mastered all sciences of his time, and he also wrote some books about alchemy, such as:

- Jame-ol-asrar ( جامع الاسرار)
- Trakib-ol-anvar ( تراکیب الانوار)
- Masabih-ol-hekmat va Mafatih-ol-rahmat (مصابیح الحکمه و مفاتیح الرحمه)
- Haghaegh-ol-esteshhadat (حقائق الاستشهادات)
- Zat-ol-faraed (ذات الفرائد)
- Alrad Ali-ebn-e-sina fi Ebtal-el-kimia (الرد علی ابن سینا فی ابطال الکیمیا)

He also participated in political works and became the minister of Masoud-ebn-Mohamad Malek Shah.

Togharayi wrote a book of poems, the best known of which is Lamiyat al-Ajam (لامیة العجم) (L-song of the non-Arabs). Togharayi wrote Lamiyyat al-Ajam as a response to the celebrated pre-Islamic poem Lāmiyyāt al-‘Arab (L-song of the Arabs). Lamiyyat al-Ajam was later the subject of an encyclopedic 14th-century commentary by Al-Safadi, entitled Al-Ghayth al-Musajam fi Sharh Lamiyyat-Ajam (Flowing Desert Rains in the Commentary upon the L-Poem of the Non-Arabs).

Togharayi was ultimately accused of atheism, and executed in 1105 A.D.
