= Hu Hong =

Hu Hong (Chinese: 胡宏; 1105–1161), courtesy name Renzhong (仁仲), born in Chong'an (崇安县) in Fujian province, was a Confucian scholar during the Song dynasty. He studied the Cheng School of philosophy.
