= Abu al-Bayan ibn al-Mudawwar =

Egyptian court physician

Abu al-Bayan ibn al-Mudawwar (sometimes referred to simply as ibn al-Mudawwar or, erroneously, as Mudawwar) (1101–1184) was a Karaite Jew living in Cairo during the twelfth century. He served as court physician to the last Egyptian Fatimid caliphs and later to Saladin, who pensioned him when he was sixty-three years old. He was replaced in his former position by, among others, Maimonides.

During the twenty years of his retirement his house was crowded with pupils; but he refused to see patients at their homes unless they were his friends. One day he was sent for by the emir Izz ad-Din abu-l-'Asakir Sultan ibn 'Izz ad-Dawla ibn Munqidh (uncle of the historian Usamah ibn Munqidh), who, on his arrival in Egypt, had fallen sick; ibn al-Mudawwar refused to go until requested to do so by al-Qadi al-Fadil, the private secretary of Saladin.

According to ibn Abi Usaibi'a, ibn al-Mudawwar left works on medical subjects, but they are no longer extant.

== Resources ==
- Kohler, Kaufmann and M. Seligsohn. "Mudawwar, Abu al-Bayan ibn al-". Jewish Encyclopedia. Funk and Wagnalls, 1901–1906; which gives the following bibliography:
  - Ibn Abi Uṣaibi'a, Kitab 'Uyun al-Anba fi Tabaḳat al-Aṭibba, ed. Aug. Müller. ii. 115, Königsberg, 1884;
  - Eliakim Carmoly, in Revue Orientale, i. 404.
