= Helena of Skövde =

Swedish saint (died 1164)

Saint Helena of Skövde
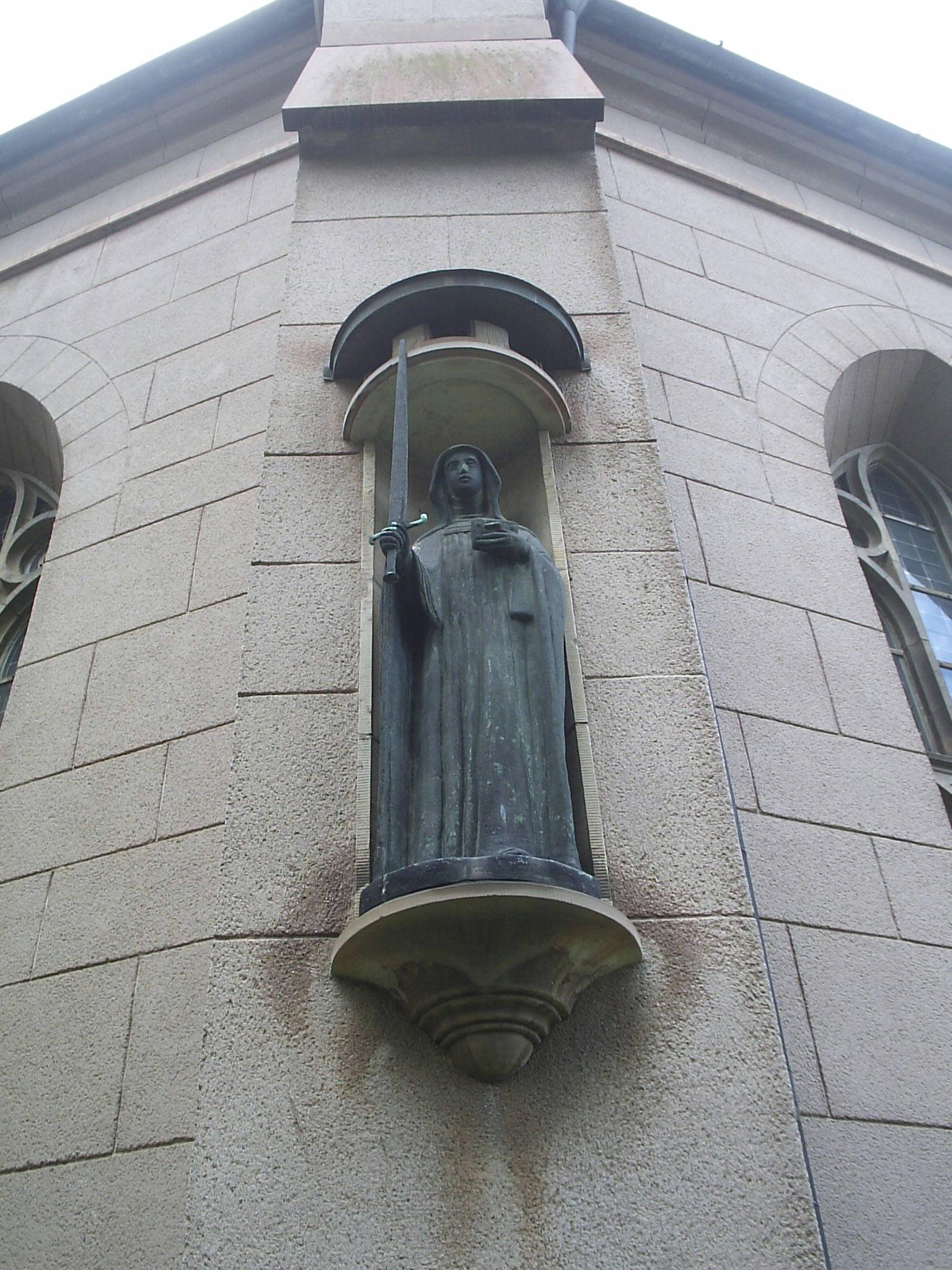
- Statuette of St. Helena outside St. Helena's church in Skövde, created by Astri Taube during the 1950s.
- Born: Västergötland, Sweden
- Died: 1160; Götene, Sweden
- Venerated in: Catholic Church; Church of Sweden
- Canonized: 1164 by Pope Alexander III
- Feast: 31 July
- Patronage: Västergötland, Sweden; Skövde, Sweden

Helena of Skövde (d. 1164, also called Helen or Elin) was a Swedish saint and patron to what is now Västergötland, in southwest Sweden, where she was born. Her father might have been a duke (or jarl) named Guthorm. Helena was widowed at a young age, but instead of remarrying, she "devoted herself to works of charity and piety, keeping her gates open to the poor, and clothing them". She also built, at her expense, most of the church in Sköfde in southcentral Sweden. According to hagiographer Agnes B. C. Dunbar, she built a portico between the church and its tower, and when asked about its purpose, replied, "God will give us some saint whose body and relics can be suitably placed there". Eventually, she was interred there. The church, which was named for her since the Middle Ages, was burned down during the city's fire in 1759, was rebuilt on its original foundations, and is still used today. Helena's burial chamber is located in the oldest part of the church.

Helena had a dream, while visiting Götene in western Sweden, that the village's church, with her in it, flew away to Sköfde. She interpreted the dream as a prediction that she would die in Gotene and be buried at Sköfde, which, as Dunbar reported, "eventually happened". In about 1164, her daughter's husband, while Helena was on a pilgrimage to Jerusalem, was killed by his servants, who admitted to it but claimed that Helena had incited them to do it. His family became her enemies and persecutors; one of them, while she was visiting Gotene "for indulgences to the consecration of the church of Gotene", stabbed and killed her.

Many miracles occurred after her death. A blind man was healed the day of Helena's murder, while passing by where it happened with a boy who was leading him. The boy saw "a light like a burning candle in the bushes", told the man what he saw, and after a search, found Helena's finger wearing a ring she had brought from Jerusalem. The blind man touched his eyes with the blood from the finger and was immediately healed. While transporting Helena's body to Sköfde, a fountain, later called Lene Kild ("St. Helen's Fountain") sprung up where they rested. At the cemetery where she was buried in Sköfde, her body was washed on a large stone, which was cut in two parts. The part of the stone stained with her blood was propped up so no one would step on it; according to Dunbar, many miracles occurred there, which became a place of veneration for Helena, even after the Reformation.

In the late 16th century, according to Catholic historian Francis Mershman, Abraham Angermannus, the fourth Lutheran Archbishop of Uppsala, had Helena's fountain, along with other springs with religious significance, filled up with stones and rubbish, but pilgrims traveled to Helena's grave every summer, where they were healed after staying there all night; they took little bags of earth from under her tombstone, leaving their crutches behind, and made "votive offerings in token of gratitude". Another legend states that devotion to the coffin containing Helena's body floated to Tiisvilde, a small town in the nearby Danish island Zealand, where a spring "broke forth where the coffin touched land". Mershman stated that it might have been a reason for Helena's veneration at Tiisvilde, although it is possible that she visited there or that some of her relics had been brought there.

Helena was canonized by Pope Alexander III, on the recommendation of Stefan, the first Archbishop of Uppsala. She was the first Swedish nun to be canonized. Her feast day is 31 July.
