= 1240s =

Decade

The 1240s was a decade of the Julian Calendar which began on January 1, 1240, and ended on December 31, 1249.

== Events ==
=== 1240 ===
==== By place ====
====== Europe ======
- May 24 – Duke Skule Bårdsson, claimant to the Norwegian throne, is defeated by King Haakon IV ("the Old") and his supporters. He seeks refuge in Elgeseter Priory in Trondheim, and Haakon burns down the monastery, in which Skule is burned alive. Haakon becomes the undisputed ruler; this ends the civil war era in Norway, after 110 years.
- July 15 – Battle of the Neva: A Swedish army under Bishop Thomas sails up the Gulf of Finland in their longboats. They proceed into the Neva River with the aim of seizing control over Lake Ladoga and from there, striking at the city of Novgorod. Prince Alexander rallies his druzhina comparable to the 'household' of western European countries, and decisively routs the Swedish forces, saving the Novgorod Republic from a full-scale enemy invasion from the North. As a result, Alexander wins his first military victory at the age of 19 and receives the title of 'Nevsky'.
- August – Siege of Faenza: Frederick II lays siege to the town of Faenza during the war of the Guelphs and Ghibellines. Meanwhile, Frederick makes an alliance with Pisa to support his campaign against the Papal States.
- September – 1240 Izborsk and Pskov campaign: An alliance of the Livonian Order, the Bishopric of Dorpat and the pretender-prince Yaroslav Vladimirovich of Pskov besiege and conquer the border fortress of Izborsk in the Pskov Land. After Pskovian defenders fail to retake the town, the allied forces advance to the capital Pskov itself, compelling it to surrender, resulting in the brief overthrow of the pro-Suzdalian faction that supports prince Alexander Nevsky.
- Winter
  - Alexander Nevsky quarrels with the Kievan nobles (boyars) and merchants of Novgorod, probably about peaceful trade with the westerners. He is banished, along with his mother, wife and his druzhina to take up residence in the region around Moscow, a minor town on the western border of the Principality of Vladimir-Suzdal.
  - 1240–1241 Votia campaign begins when an alliance of the Livonian Order, the Bishopric of Ösel–Wiek and Estonians Chud march into Votia.
- Reconquista – King Sancho II of Portugal ("the Pious") conquers the city of Ayamonte from the Almoravids, securing the Portuguese position in Al-Andalus.

====== Africa ======
- Summer – As-Salih Ayyub becomes ruler of Egypt, after deposing his half-brother Al-Adil II. Meanwhile, other members of the Ayyubid Dynasty are conspiring to depose him and replace him with his uncle, As-Salih Ismail. During his reign, As-Salih begins buying large numbers of Kipchak slaves, to form an elite core in the Egyptian army, known as Mamluks.

====== Levant ======
- October 10 – Richard of Cornwall, brother of King Henry III of England, arrives at Acre for a pilgrimage to Jerusalem. His pilgrimage has the approval of Emperor Frederick II, who is married to his younger sister, Isabella of England, and gives him the task to make arrangements with the Military Orders. On his arrival, Richard travels to Ascalon, where he is met by ambassadors from As-Salih Ayyub. As a negotiator, he is successful in the release of prisoners captured in the Battle at Gaza (1239), and he also assists with the building of the citadel in Ascalon.

====== Mongol Empire ======
- Winter – The Mongols under Batu Khan cross the frozen river Dnieper and lay siege to the city of Kiev. On December 6, the walls are rendered rubble by Chinese catapults and the Mongols pour into the city. Brutal hand-to-hand street fighting occurs, the Kievans are eventually forced to fall back to the central parts of the city. Many people take refuge in the Church of the Blessed Virgin. As scores of terrified Kievans climb onto the Church's upper balcony to shield themselves from Mongol arrows, their collective weight strains its infrastructure, causing the roof to collapse and crush countless citizens under its weight. Of a total population of 50,000, all but 2,000 are massacred.

==== By topic ====
====== Religion ======
- June 12 – The Disputation of Paris begins at the court of King Louis IX ("the Saint"), where four rabbis defend the Talmud against Nicholas Donin's accusations of blasphemy.
- Pope Gregory IX authorizes a Crusade against Novgorod, hoping that the Kievan Rus' will be too preoccupied dealing with the raiding Mongols to the east to defend.

=== 1241 ===
- March 18 – Battle of Chmielnik (Mongol invasion of Poland): The Mongols overwhelm the feudal Polish armies of Sandomierz and Kraków provinces, and plunder the abandoned city of Kraków.
- April 9 – Battle of Legnica: The Mongols, under the command of Baidar, Kadan and Orda Khan, defeat the feudal Polish nobility, including the Knights Templar.
- April 11 – Battle of Mohi: Batu Khan and Subutai defeat Béla IV of Hungary. The battle is the last major event in the Mongol Invasion of Europe.
- May – Battle of Giglio: an Imperial fleet defeats a Genoan fleet in the Tyrrhenian Sea.
- May 10 – Battle of Cameirge in Ulster: The Milesian Irish septs of the Ó Dónaills from Donegal, the Ó Néills from Armagh and the Ó Dochartaighs of Connacht defeat the last Tuatha Dé Danann sept, the Meic Lochlainn of Tír Eoghain and Inishowen under Domhnall mac Muirchertaigh Mac Lochlainn. From now on the Kings of Tír Eoghain will all be of the Ó Néill dynasty, Brian Ua Néill becoming sole ruler.
- Early northern summer – A succession crisis or other priorities results in the Mongols withdrawing behind their river barrier into Ukraine and the Russias, leaving Central Asian and far Eastern Europe peoples tributary to the Khanates, but leaving Poland and Hungary to begin recovery and reorganization.
- August 29 – After Henry III of England's invasion of Wales, the Treaty of Gwerneigron is signed by him and Dafydd ap Llywelyn, curbing the latter's authority and denying him royal title.
- September 23 – Snorri Sturluson, Icelandic saga writer, is murdered by Gissur Þorvaldsson, an emissary of King Haakon IV of Norway.
- December – Siege of Lahore (1241): The Mongols under Tair Bahadur besiege and sack the city of Lahore in the Delhi Sultanate.
- December 11 – Ögedei Khan dies after a drinking binge. His death halts the Mongol advance into Western Europe.
- Emperor Lizong of Song China accepts the Neo-Confucian teachings of the late Zhu Xi, including his commentary on the Four Books. This will have an impact upon the philosophical schools of surrounding countries as well, including Korea, Japan, and Vietnam.
- Livonian Crusade: The Estonian rebellion of 1237 is suppressed on Saaremaa Island, by the Livonian Order.
- The University of Valladolid is founded in Spain.

=== 1242 ===
==== By place ====
====== Europe ======
- Spring – Prince Alexander Nevsky is joined by his brother Andrey II (Yaroslavich) at Novgorod, supported with his elite druzhina (or 'household') from Suzdal. They head southwest across the frozen marshes, which cover much of the land between Novgorod and Pskov. On March 5, Alexander retakes the city almost without a struggle, before the larger Crusader garrison in nearby Izborsk can intervene.
- April – A Russian force led by Alexander Nevsky crosses the frontier between Novgorod and Livonian Crusader territory, to raid into Catholic Estonia. After that, Alexander breaks his army off into contingents to ravage the countryside. He is forced to turn back, when a local Crusader force under Bishop Hermann von Buxhövden defeats Alexander's advance guard at Mooste bridge south of Tartu.
- April 5 – Battle of Lake Peipus (or Battle on the Ice): Russian forces led by Alexander Nevsky, rebuff an invasion attempt by a Crusader army (some 2,600 men), including German Teutonic Knights. The opposing armies meet upon the frozen surface of Lake Peipus. The outnumbered Teutonic Knights are defeated on the slippery surface, by Alexander's elite druzhina and the Novgorod forces.
- May 28 – Avignonet massacre: A group of Cathars, with the probable connivance of Count Raymond VII of Toulouse, murder the inquisitor William Arnaud and eleven of his companions.
- July 21–22 – Battle of Taillebourg: French forces (some 25,000 men) under King Louis IX (the Saint) defeat King Henry III at the bridge over the Charente River near Taillebourg. After the battle, Louis continues to pursue the English troops, capturing many prisoners. Henry retreats with the remnants of his army to Bordeaux, where he spends the winter.
- Summer – Alexander Nevsky sends envoys to Batu Khan, preemptively capitulating before the Mongols even though they have not reached Novgorod, and accepts his rule as Mongol overlord.
- November 16 – King Béla IV issues the Golden Bull to the inhabitants of Gradec (modern-day Zagreb) and Samobor in Croatia. By this golden bull, Béla proclaimes Gradec a royal free city.
- Siegfried III, archbishop of Mainz, conquers Wiesbaden (a free imperial city) and orders the city's destruction, during the war of Emperor Frederick II against the Papal States.
- King Sancho II (the Pious) conquers the cities of Tavira, Alvor and Paderne, in his continuing expansion against the Muslims, known as the Reconquista.

====== Mongol Empire ======
- Spring – Siege of Esztergom: The Mongols under Batu Khan assault and destroy most of the Hungarian city of Esztergom. Batu Khan sends a reconnaissance party against the Holy Roman Empire.
- Battle of Grobnik Field: Croatian forces under Béla IV stop the Mongol invasion in Hungary and Croatia. Béla rebuilds the country and orders the building of fortifications through his kingdom.
- Batu Khan establishes the Golden Horde at Sarai and withdraws his forces after messengers arrive with the news that the Great Khan Ögedei Khan has died (see 1241).

====== England ======
- May – Isabella of Angoulême, mother of Henry III, persuades him to mount an expedition to retake Poitou. On May 20, Henry arrives at Royan and joins the rebelling French nobles – forming an army (some 30,000 men). Louis IX exchanges letters with Henry to resolve the conflict, but the dispute escalates further.

====== Africa ======
- Summer – In the Maghreb, after a string of successes against the Almohad Caliphate, Hafsid forces under Sultan Abu Zakariya Yahya, conquer the city of Tlemcen (modern Algeria). The Kingdom of Tlemcen becomes a vassal of Abu Zakariya, and is formed in a series of small states between his rule and the states of the Western Maghreb.

====== Middle East ======
- Spring – The Templar Knights raid the city of Hebron. Meanwhile, An-Nasir Dawud, Ayyubid ruler of Damascus, sends forces to cut off the road to Jerusalem, and to levy tolls on the pilgrims and merchants that pass by.

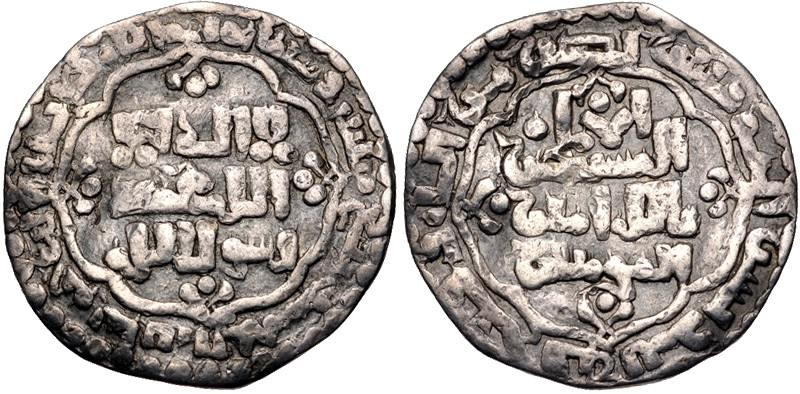
Dirham of al-Mustansir, Abbasid caliph

- Death of Abbasid caliph al-Mustansir and succession of al-Musta'sim to the Caliphal throne.

====== Asia ======
- February 10 – The 10-year-old Emperor Shijō of Japan dies suddenly; despite a dispute over who should follow him as sovereign, Go-Saga (son of former Emperor Tsuchimikado) ascends to the throne.

==== By topic ====
====== Religion ======
- William of Modena, Italian bishop and papal diplomat, sets up four dioceses in Poland, including the Archdiocese of Warmia.

====== Science ======
- Ibn al-Nafis, Arab polymath and writer, suggests that the right and left ventricles of the heart are separate, and describes the lesser circulation of blood.

=== 1243 ===
==== By place ====
====== Europe ======
- March – King Ferdinand III (the Saint) turns the independent Taifa of Murcia into a protectorate, and initiates the process of the colonization and Christianization of the region. He receives the submission of the Moors, under the terms of a peace agreement (the famous Treaty of Alcaraz).
- April 27 – Treaty of Bordeaux: King Louis IX (the Saint) and King Henry III agree to a truce that ends the Saintonge War. The truce does not stop the on-going clashes (and further tensions) between France and England.
- Siege of Viterbo: Emperor Frederick II besieges Viterbo on request of the rebel citizens. The defenders are able to set fire to the siege towers and after signing a peace treaty, Frederick is persuaded to withdraw his army.
- Siege of Montségur: French forces (some 10,000 men) begin the siege of Château de Montségur to raze the stronghold held by the rebellious Cathars. The castle is defended by some 100 troops and 500 refugees.
- May 1 – The Castillan troops are garrisoned in Murcia, to support the Hudid Dynasty.

====== England ======
- Spring – Henry III bestows the custody of Kenilworth Castle to Simon de Montfort. Simon's wife Eleanor, Henry's sister, already owned Odiham Castle (or King John's Castle) so Simon has two of the strongest fortresses in England under his control.

====== Levant ======
- June 12 – A Crusader force under Balian III, lord of Beirut, captures Tyre after a long siege. The barons seize the citadel on July 10, with the help of Alice, queen of Cyprus, whose forces arrive on June 15. This ending the War of the Lombards.

====== Mongol Empire ======
- June 26 – Battle of Köse Dağ: The Mongols under Baiju Noyan defeat the Seljuk Turks of the Sultanate of Rum and their Byzantine allies. The Seljuks and the Empire of Trebizond become vassals of the Mongols.

==== By topic ====
====== Religion ======
- June 25 – Pope Innocent IV succeeds Celestine IV as the 180th pope of the Catholic Church, after a sede vacante of 7 months.

=== 1244 ===
==== By place ====
====== Europe ======
- March 16 – Siege of Montségur: French forces capture and destroy Château de Montségur in Languedoc, after a 9-month siege. Some 200 'heretics' (perfecti and credentes) are burnt in a bonfire, near the foot of the castle. This marks the final defeat of the Cathars (or Albigensians); the followers become scattered fugitives, meeting in forests and mountain wilds.
- March 26 – Treaty of Almizra: King James I (the Conqueror) and King Ferdinand III (the Saint) agree on the distribution of Muslim lands yet to be conquered. All lands south of a line, from the cities of Biar to Villajoyosa through Busot, are reserved for the Crown of Castile. This ends further Aragonese expansion on the Iberian Peninsula.
- December – King Louis IX (the Saint) falls desperately ill of a severe malarian infection. Near-death, he vows that if he recovers he will set out for a crusade. Louis' life is spared and as soon as his health permits him, he takes the cross and immediately begins preparations for the Seventh Crusade.

====== Levant ======
- June – Khwarazmian forces (some 10,000 men) invade Syrian territory, ravaging the land and burning the villages. As Damascus is too strong for a siege, they attack Galilee, past the town of Tiberias – which they capture. The Khwarazmians attack further southward through Nablus towards Jerusalem.
- July 15 – Siege of Jerusalem: Khwarazmian horsemen attack and sack the 'holy city' of Jerusalem. There is bloody fighting in the streets, the Khwarazmian force their way into the Armenian Quarter, where they decimate the Christian population, and drive out the Jews. The city is left in a state of ruin.
- August 23 – The Tower of David surrenders to the Khwarazmian forces, some 6,000 Christian men, women and children march out of Jerusalem. As they move along the road toward Jaffa, they see crusader flags waving on the Walls of Jerusalem. Returning, some 2,000 of them are massacred.
- October 4 – The Crusaders assemble a force of some 1,000 cavalry and 6,000 men outside Acre, after hearing that Jerusalem is sacked by the Khwarazmians. They are joined by the Ayyubid forces (some 4,000 men) of Damascus and Homs – while Emir An-Nasir Dawud brings his army from Kerak.
- October 17 – Battle of La Forbie: A Crusader army (some 10,000 men) under Walter IV of Brienne and Ayyubid allies are defeated near Hiribya (or La Forbie) by Egyptian and Khwarazmian forces. The army is destroyed, with about 7,500 men killed. Walter and William of Chastelneuf are captured.

==== By topic ====
====== Religion ======
- June 7 – Pope Innocent IV is driven from Rome by imperial forces of Emperor Frederick II, and travels secretly in disguise to Sutri. Genoese galleys prepared by his relatives are waiting for him at the port of Civitavecchia to take him to Genoa.
- October 5 – Innocent IV flees to France and travels to Lyon, where he arrives on November 29. Although the city is nominally subject to the Holy Roman Empire, Innocent falls under the protection of Louis IX.
- December 27 – Innocent IV summons a general council to meet in Lyon (some 140 bishops eventually come) to attend what becomes later the First Council of Lyon.

=== 1245 ===
==== By place ====
====== Europe ======
- Winter – Siege of Jaén: Castilian forces under King Ferdinand III (the Saint) besiege the Moorish-held city of Jaén. During the siege Moorish knights sally out and manage to capture a Castilian supply caravan. Meanwhile, Ferdinand tries to launch attacks on the various city gates, but all are ineffective.
- In witness of the toll taken by war and fiscal pressure in the Kingdom of Castile, the region of Segovia is described this year as depopulated and sterile.

====== England ======
- King Henry III starts the work of rebuilding Westminster Abbey, as a tribute to Edward the Confessor.

====== Levant ======
- April – Egyptian forces under As-Salih Ayyub besiege the city of Damascus. After six months, As-Salih Ismail, ruler of Damascus, surrenders to Ayyub in return for a vassal-principality, consisting of Baalbek and the Hauran. Ayyub is awarded the title of sultan by Caliph Al-Musta'sim in Baghdad.

==== By topic ====
====== Religion ======
- February 21 – Thomas, bishop of Turku (modern Finland), is granted resignation by Pope Innocent IV. He admits to committing several felonies, such as torturing and forging a papal letter.
- April 16 – Innocent IV sends Giovanni da Pian del Carpine (accompanied by Stephen of Bohemia) to the Mongol court at Karakorum, suggesting that the Mongols convert to Christianity.
- June 28 – First Council of Lyon: In a general church council held at Lyon, Innocent IV declares Emperor Frederick II excommunicated and deposed. He proclaims the Seventh Crusade.

=== 1246 ===
==== By place ====
====== Europe ======
- February 28 – Siege of Jaén: Castilian forces, led by King Ferdinand III (the Saint), manage to take the city of Jaén from the Andalucians. In a combined assault with the knights of the Order of Santiago, the city is handed over by Sultan Muhammad I, who accepts Ferdinand's overlordship in exchange for a 20-year truce. The Emirate of Granada becomes a vassal state of the Kingdom of Castile.
- May 22 – Henry Raspe is elected anti-king in Germany in opposition to Conrad IV of Germany and Conrad's father, the excommunicated emperor Frederick II.
- June 15 – Battle of the Leitha River: Hungarian forces, under King Béla IV, defeat Duke Frederick II (the Quarrelsome) at the banks of the Leitha River. Frederick is killed (leaving no male heirs); the House of Babenberg is dissolved. Emperor Frederick II places the fiefs of Austria and Styria under his rule. This ends the Austrian claims to the western counties of Hungary.
- November – Michael II Asen, ruler (tsar) of the Bulgarian Empire, succeeds his brother Kaliman I (possibly poisoned). He confirms the reconquest of Bulgarian territories against John III (Doukas Vatatzes), Byzantine ruler of the Empire of Nicaea.
- Frederick II suppresses a Sicilian revolt and deports the remaining Muslim inhabitants of Lucera (approximate date).

====== Mongol Empire ======
- August 24 – Güyük Khan, eldest son of Ögedei Khan, is enthroned as the 3rd Great Khan of the Mongol Empire (which is witnessed by a papal mission under Giovanni da Pian del Carpine) at Karakorum. Güyük reverses several edicts of his mother, Töregene Khatun, and orders Eljigidei, Mongol viceroy of Persia, to advance into Syria and prepare an attack on Baghdad.
- September 30 – Yaroslav II, father of Alexander Nevsky, is poisoned by Töregene Khatun, after he is summoned by Güyük Khan in Karakorum.

====== Levant ======
- Alice of Champagne, queen and regent of Jerusalem, dies after a 3-year reign. She is succeeded by her son, Henry I of Cyprus (the Fat), who appoints Balian III of Beirut as his bailli and confirms Philip of Montfort in the possession of Tyre.
- 2 October – Damascus falls to the Ayyubid vizier Mu'in al-Din Hasan ibn al-Shaykh after a siege of some four months.

====== Asia ======
- February 16 – Emperor Go-Saga abdicates the throne in favor of his 3-year-old son, Go-Fukakusa, who becomes the 89th Emperor of Japan.

==== By topic ====
====== Arts ======
- Robert Grosseteste translates Aristotle's Nicomachean Ethics from Greek into Latin, which marks the true start of the rediscovery of the philosopher by Medieval Europe.

====== Nature ======
- The perihelion of the Earth's orbit coincides with the December solstice.

====== Religion ======
- Beaulieu Abbey in England, founded earlier by King John, is dedicated in the presence of King Henry III, Queen Eleanor and 7-year-old Prince Edward.
- Katedralskolan in Uppsala is established beside Uppsala Cathedral as a seminary for the clergy (the founding year according to tradition).

=== 1247 ===
==== By place ====
====== Europe ======
- War of the Thuringian Succession: The claims on the Ludovingians' inheritance after the death of Henry Raspe, landgrave of Thuringia, leads to a dispute over the succession territories of Thuringia and Hesse, between his niece Sophie of Thuringia and her cousin Henry III ("the Illustrious"), who claim the territories as fiefs of the Electorate of Mainz.
- Rome becomes 2,000 years old.
- July 2 – King Béla IV grants territories to the Knights Hospitaller in the Banate of Severin and Hungarian Cumania (according to a document called the Diploma of the Joannites), makes an early mention of Litovoi and other Vlach/Romanian local rulers, in Wallachia and Transylvania.
- Summer – Siege of Seville: Castilian forces under King Ferdinand III ("the Saint") begin to besiege Seville, the city is isolated and Ramón de Bonifaz sails with 13 galleys up the Guadalquivir River to scatter some 40 smaller Almohad ships trying to oppose him (with many destroyed).
- December 1 – A rebellion arises among the Muslim subjects in the region of Valencia. As a punishment, King James I of Aragon ("the Conqueror"), issues an order of expulsion of the Muslims from his realm, leading numerous people into exile in Andalusia and North Africa.

====== Levant ======
- June 17 – Egyptian forces under Sultan As-Salih Ayyub capture Tiberias and his castle. Mount Tabor and Belvoir Castle are occupied soon afterward. Next, Ayyub moves his army to siege Ascalon – which is defended by a garrison of Knights Hospitaller. They summon the help from Acre and Cyprus.
- Summer – King Henry I ("the Fat") sends a Cypriot squadron of 8 galleys with 100 knights led by Baldwin of Ibelin, to Acre. With the support of the Italian colonists, they fitted out 7 more galleys and some 50 lighter ships, to relieve the siege at Ascalon – which is now blockaded by the Egyptian fleet.
- The Egyptian fleet (some 20 galleys) confronts the Crusader ships led by Baldwin of Ibelin at Ascalon. But before contact is made, it is caught in a sudden Mediterranean storm. Many of the Muslim ships are driven ashore and wrecked; the survivors sail back to Egypt.
- October 15 – Egyptian forces under As-Salih Ayyub capture Ascalon by surprise – while a battering-ram forces a passageway under the walls right into the citadel. Most of the defenders are massacred, and the remainder of the garrison is taken prisoner.

====== British Isles ======
- Battle of Ballyshannon: Norman forces under Maurice FitzGerald defeat a Gaelic army near Ballyshannon in northern Ireland. After the battle, the entire country of Donegal is devastated and plundered by the Normans.
- The Bethlem Royal Hospital is founded in London during the reign of King Henry III.
- Romford (located within Greater London) is chartered as a market town.

====== Asia ======
- The Hōjō clan under Hōjō Tokiyori destroys the Miura family; and in doing so, the clan consolidates its authority as regents in Japan.

==== By topic ====
====== Mathematics ======
- Qin Jiushao, Chinese mathematician, writes the Mathematical Treatise in Nine Sections.

====== Medicine ======
- Song Ci publishes the Collected Cases of Injustice Rectified, a book considered to be the first monographic work on forensic medicine.

=== 1248 ===
==== By place ====
====== Seventh Crusade ======
- August 12 – King Louis IX of France ("the Saint") leaves Paris together with his wife, Queen Margaret of Provence, and her sister Beatrice of Provence. Two of Louis' brothers, Charles of Anjou and Robert of Artois, are also present. He is followed by his cousins, Hugh IV of Burgundy and Peter Mauclerc, both are veterans of the Barons' Crusade.
- August 25 – Louis IX departs from Aigues-Mortes and Marseilles with a French expeditionary force (some 10,000 men) transported by 100 ships. An English detachment (some 5,000 men) under William Longespée the Younger, grandson of King Henry III, and his mistress Ida de Tosny follows close behind with 36 transport ships.
- September 17 – Louis IX arrives at Limassol on the island of Cyprus. He gathers his forces and is well received by King Henry I of Cyprus ("the Fat"). The Crusaders are supplemented by nobles from Acre, including Grand Masters Jean de Ronay and Guillaume de Sonnac. Louis prepares a plan of campaign, with Egypt as the prime objective.
- December – Louis IX receives an embassy during his stay in Cyprus from the Mongol general, Eljigidei, who is viceroy in Persia. They bring a letter from Guyuk Khan (who had died by the time his envoys reached Cyprus) with no demands of submission, but talking in terms about Mongol favouritism for Christianity, and a proposal of a joint invasion against the Ayyubid forces in Syria.
- December – Louis IX decides to spend the winter on Cyprus to make preparations against Egypt. Meanwhile, the nobles persuade him to start negotiations with Sultan As-Salih Ayyub to intervene in the internal Ayyubid affairs. But Louis rejects this offer and orders the Knights Templar to break off their negotiations with As-Salih.

====== Europe ======
- February 18 – Battle of Parma: Imperial forces (some 6,000 men) under Emperor Frederick II are defeated by the Lombard League at Parma. Much of Frederick's treasure is lost, while he is hunting in the Taro Valley.
- November 23 – Reconquista: Siege of Seville: Castilian forces under King Ferdinand III of Castile ("the Saint") recapture the city of Seville from the Almohads, after a 16-month siege. Prince Alfonso X of Castile takes the city of Alicante.
- November 24–25 – In the middle of the night a mass on the north side of Mont Granier suddenly collapses, in one of the largest historical rock slope failures.
- December – William of Villehardouin, Latin ruler of the Principality of Achaea, captures Monemvasia – last remaining Byzantine outpost on the Peloponnese.
- December – Reconquista: Ferdinand III issues an edict to expel the Almohads out of Seville. Many Muslims sail to North Africa and others travel to Granada in Al-Andalus.

==== By topic ====
====== Cities and Towns ======
- August 25 – The Dutch city of Ommen receives city rights and fortification rights from Otto III, archbishop of Utrecht, after the town has been pillaged by a local robber baron.

====== Religion ======
- April 26 – The Gothic chapel Sainte-Chapelle (Holy Chapel) is completed and consecrated in Paris. Louis IX moves the relics of the True Cross and Holy Lance to the chapel with great ceremony.
- August 15 – The foundation stone of Cologne Cathedral is laid by Archbishop Konrad von Hochstaden, after the older cathedral is burned down on April 30 (construction is completed in 1880).
- Pope Innocent IV grants the Croatians of southern Dalmatia permission to use their own language and script in the Roman Rite liturgy (see Glagolitic alphabet).

=== 1249 ===
==== By place ====
====== Seventh Crusade ======
- May 13 – King Louis IX of France ("the Saint") assembles a Crusader fleet of 120 transports and embarks an army (some 15,000 men) at Limassol. Unfortunately, a storm scatters the ships a few days later. On May 30, Louis sets sail to Egypt – only a quarter of his forces sails with him, the others make their way independently to the Egyptian coast. Finally, the royal squadron arrives off Damietta on June 4 aboard Louis' flagship the Montjoie. The king's advisers urges a delay until the rest of his transports arrive before attempting to disembark, but Louis refuses.
- June 5 – Siege of Damietta: Louis IX lands with a Crusader force and captures Damietta, after a fierce battle at the edge of the sea. The onslaught of the knights of France and those of Outremer under John of Ibelin, force the Ayyubids back with heavy losses. At nightfall, Fakhr ad-Din withdraws his army over a bridge of boats to Damietta. Finding the population there in panic and the garrison wavering, Fakhr ad-Din decides to evacuate the city. On June 6, Louis marches triumphantly over the bridge into Damietta and builds a camp to attack Cairo.
- November 20 – Louis IX sets out (against the advice of his nobles) with a Crusader force from Damietta, along the southern road to Mansourah. A garrison is left to guard the city – where Queen Margaret of Provence and Patriarch Robert of Nantes remain. The Crusaders make slow progress along the Nile, carrying a number of supplies and equipment. After 32 days, Louis orders to make camp opposite the Ayyubid camp near Mansourah, protected by a branch of the river and fortifications. Both camps use their catapults to bombard each other.
- December – Louis IX consolidates his forces at Mansourah. After the death of Sultan As-Salih Ayyub, Fakhr ad-Din effectively becomes the ruler of Egypt. He takes command of the city's defense and his cavalry harasses the Crusaders but none of these skirmishes is successful in holding up the Crusader's advance. Meanwhile, Louis orders the construction of a dyke at Mansourah, although the Crusaders build covered galleries to protect the workmen, the Egyptian bombardment (particularly Greek fire), is so formidable that the work is halted.

====== Europe ======
- February 16 – Louis IX sends Andrew of Longjumeau on a diplomatic mission to meet the "Great Khan" of the Mongol Empire. He carries letters from Louis and the Papal States, and rich presents, including a chapel-tent lined with scarlet cloth and embroidered with sacred pictures. From Cyprus he goes to the port of Antioch in Syria and travels for a year to the khan's court at Karakorum.
- May – Nicaean–Latin Wars: Latin forces led by William of Villehardouin, arrive on the island of Rhodes on their way to join the Seventh Crusade. This causes the Nicaeans to raise the siege of Rhodes. William concludes an agreement with the Genoese and leaves behind some 100 knights before departing for the Holy Land.
- May 26 – Battle of Fossalta: King Enzo of Sardinia, an illegitimate son of Emperor Frederick II, is captured and imprisoned by Lombard forces, in a clash between the Guelphs and Ghibellines. Enzo is put in golden chains and paraded around Bologna on a horse. He becomes a prisoner in a palace, named Palazzo Re Enzo.
- July 6 – King Alexander II of Scotland dies of a fever at the island of Kerrera in the Inner Hebrides. He is succeeded by his 7-year-old son, Alexander III, who is crowned as ruler of Scotland at Scone on July 13. Alexander's minority causes a struggle for control of affairs between Walter Comyn and Alan Durward, Justiciar of Scotia.
- Summer – Second Swedish Crusade: A Swedish expedition led by Birger Jarl subjugates the province of Tavastia – securing Swedish power in Finland. As a part of the Treaty of Lödöse Birger marries off his 11-year-old daughter Rikissa to Haakon the Young, ruler and eldest son of King Haakon IV of Norway.
- August 15 – First Battle of Athenry: Gaelic forces of Connacht besiege Athenry Castle in County Galway in Ireland, but are repelled by the Normans under Jordan de Exeter, Sheriff of Connacht.
- Reconquista: King Afonso III of Portugal ("the Boulonnais") recaptures Faro and Silves in the Algarve from the Almohads, thus completing the expulsion of the Moors from Portugal. The Almohads also lose possession of Alicante in Al-Andalus (modern Spain).
- Winter – William of Villehardouin tours the Peloponnese and selects sites for new fortifications such as Grand Magne and Leuktron. At Mystras (ancient Sparta), he builds a fortress and a palace.

====== Asia ======
- March – The Japanese Hōji period ends during the reign of Emperor Go-Fukakusa and the Kenchō period begins (until 1256).
- The Hikitsuke, a judicial organ of the Kamakura and Ashikaga shogunates of Japan, is established.

==== By topic ====
====== Cities and Towns ======
- The city of Stralsund is burned to the ground, by German forces from the rival Free City of Lübeck. Later, the town is rebuilt with a massive defensive wall having 11 city gates and some 30 watchtowers.

====== Education ======
- Spring – University College, the first college at Oxford, is founded with money from the estate of William of Durham.

====== Microhistory ======
- Jean Mouflet makes an agreement with the abbot of Saint-Pierre-le-Vif in the Senonais region in France: in return for an annual payment, the monastery will recognize Jean as a "citizen of Sens". He is a leather merchant, with a leather shop that he leases for the rent of 50 shillings a year. The agreement is witnessed by Jean's wife, Douce, daughter of a wealthy and prominent citizen of Sens, Felis Charpentier.

====== Science ======
- Roger Bacon publishes a major scientific work, including writings of convex lens spectacles for treating long-sightedness, and the first publication of the formula for gunpowder in the western world.

== Significant people ==
Fibonacci. Fibonacci sequence and Liber Abbaci

== Births ==
1240

- April – Simon de Montfort the Younger, English nobleman and knight (d. 1271)
- May 2 – Duzong (or Zhao Qi), Chinese emperor (d. 1274)
- September 29 – Margaret, queen consort of Scotland (d. 1275)
- Abraham Abulafia, Moorish Jewish philosopher (d. 1292)
- Afonso Mendes de Melo, Portuguese nobleman (d. 1280)
- Agostino Novello, Italian priest and prior general (d. 1309)
- Albert II, Margrave of Meissen ("the Degenerate"), German nobleman (d. 1314)
- Andrea dei Conti, Italian nobleman and priest (d. 1302)
- Balian of Ibelin, Cypriot nobleman and knight (d. 1302)
- Benedict XI, pope of the Catholic Church (d. 1304)
- Conrad of Lichtenberg, German bishop (d. 1299)
- Frederick III, German nobleman and knight (d. 1302)
- Giovanni Pelingotto, Italian hermit and monk (d. 1304)
- Simone Ballachi, Italian monk and friar (d. 1319)
- Approximate date
- Arnaldus de Villa Nova, Spanish physician (d. 1311)
- Beka I Jaqeli, Georgian prince (mtavari) (d. 1306)
- Conrad I, German nobleman and regent (d. 1304)
- Daumantas of Pskov, Lithuanian prince (d. 1299)
- Henry VI, count of Luxembourg and Arlon (d. 1288)
- Jean d'Eppe, French nobleman and knight (d. 1293)
- Magnus Ladulås (Birgersson), king of Sweden (d. 1290)
- Siger of Brabant, French philosopher (d. 1284)

1241

- September 4 – King Alexander III of Scotland (d. 1286)
- Eleanor of Castile, queen of Edward I of England (d. 1290)
- Sophia of Denmark, queen consort of Sweden (d. 1286)

1242

- January 27 – Margaret of Hungary, Hungarian nun (d. 1270)
- March 17 – Maud de Prendergast, Irish noblewoman (d. 1272)
- June 25 – Beatrice of England, English princess (d. 1275)
- July 24 – Christina von Stommeln, German mystic (d. 1312)
- December 15 – Munetaka, Japanese shogun (d. 1274)
- Al-Ashraf Umar II, Arab ruler and astronomer (d. 1296)
- Beatrice of Castile, queen consort of Portugal (d. 1303)
- Beatrice of Navarre, duchess of Burgundy (d. 1295)
- George Pachymeres, Byzantine historian (d. 1310)
- Hōjō Tokimura, Japanese nobleman (rensho) (d. 1305)
- Patrick IV (de Dunbar), Scottish nobleman (d. 1308)
- Stephen I Kotromanić, Bosnian nobleman (d. 1314)
- Theobald Butler, Norman chief governor of Ireland (d. 1285)
- Theodoric of Landsberg, German nobleman (d. 1285)
- William I, German nobleman and archbishop (d. 1308)
- William de Leybourne, English nobleman (d. 1310)

1243

- May 31 – James II, Aragonese ruler of Majorca (d. 1311)
- June 6 – Alix of Brittany, Breton noblewoman (d. 1288)
- June 28 – Go-Fukakusa, emperor of Japan (d. 1304)
- September 2
  - Gilbert de Clare, English nobleman (d. 1295)
  - Walter Langton, bishop of Coventry (d. 1321)
- Alfonso Fernández el Niño, Spanish nobleman (d. 1281)
- An Hyang (or Ahn Yu), Korean Confucian scholar (d. 1306)
- Augustinus Triumphus, Italian hermit and writer (d. 1328)
- Awaji Nichiken, Japanese Buddhist monk (d. 1338)
- Giles of Rome, Italian friar and archbishop (d. 1316)
- John I of Chalon-Auxerre, French nobleman (d. 1309)
- Riccoldo da Monte di Croce, Italian missionary (d. 1320)
- Roger Bernard III, French nobleman and poet (d. 1302)
- Zhenjin (or Chingkim), Mongolian prince (d. 1286)

1244

- June 24 – Henry I of Hesse, German nobleman (d. 1308)
- June 25 – Ibn al-Fuwati, Arab historian and writer (d. 1323)
- Agnes Blannbekin, Austrian Beguine and mystic (d. 1315)
- Dai Biaoyuan, Chinese litterateur, poet and writer (d. 1310)
- Elizabeth the Cuman, queen consort of Hungary (d. 1290)
- Folquet de Lunel, French troubadour and writer (d. 1300)
- Guy de Montfort, English nobleman and knight (d. 1291)
- Heinrich II of Virneburg, archbishop of Cologne (d. 1332)
- Henry I (the Fat), king of Navarre (House of Blois) (d. 1274)
- Hong Dagu (or Charghu), Korean military leader (d. 1291)
- Ingeborg Eriksdotter, queen consort of Norway (d. 1287)
- John III of Prague, margrave of Brandenburg (d. 1268)
- Louis of France, French nobleman and regent (d. 1260)
- Margaret of Antioch, Outremer noblewoman (d. 1308)
- Otto III (or IV), German nobleman and knight (d. 1285)

1245

- January 16 – Edmund Crouchback, son of Henry III (d. 1296)
- May 1 – Philip III (the Bold), king of France (d. 1285)
- November 14 – Sang Sapurba, Indonesian ruler (d. 1316)
- Antony Bek (or Beck), English bishop and patriarch (d. 1311)
- Araniko (or Anige), Nepalese architect and painter (d. 1306)
- Eric of Brandenburg, archbishop of Magdeburg (d. 1295)
- Fujiwara no Saneko, Japanese empress consort (d. 1272)
- Giovanna da Signa, Italian miracle worker and saint (d. 1307)
- Kikuchi Takefusa, Japanese nobleman and samurai (d. 1285)
- Kunigunda of Halych, queen consort of Bohemia (d. 1285)
- Ma Duanlin, Chinese encyclopaedist and politician (d. 1322)
- Nichirō, Japanese Buddhist disciple and scholar (d. 1320)
- Rinaldo da Concorezzo, Italian priest and archbishop (d. 1321)
- Roger Bigod, English nobleman and Lord Marshal (d. 1306)
- Thomas de Berkeley (the Wise), English nobleman (d. 1321)
- Yahballaha III, patriarch of the Church of the East (d. 1317)
- Ziemomysł of Kuyavia, Polish ruler of Bydgoszcz (d. 1287)

1246

- March 8 – Nikkō Shōnin, Japanese religious leader (d. 1333)
- March 24 – Henry Bate of Mechelen, Brabantian philosopher
- September 14 – John FitzAlan, English nobleman (d. 1272)
- Angelo da Furci, Italian priest, orator and theologian (d. 1327)
- Drakpa Odzer, Tibetan Imperial Preceptor (Dishi) (d. 1303)
- Enrique Enríquez (the Elder), Castilian nobleman (d. 1323)
- Hugh of Lincoln (Little Saint), English Jewish boy (d. 1255)
- Jutta of Denmark (or Judith), Danish princess and abbess
- Konoe Motohira, Japanese nobleman and regent (d. 1268)
- Nicholas of Tolentino, Italian monk, friar and mystic (d. 1305)
- Paolo Malatesta, Italian nobleman and diplomat (d. 1285)
- Riccobaldo of Ferrara, Italian chronicler and geographer
- Safi al-Din al-Hindi, Indian scholar and theologian (d. 1315)
- Takezaki Suenaga, Japanese retainer and samurai (d. 1314)
- Teodosije the Hilandarian, Serbian hagiographer (d. 1328)

1247

- Angelo da Clareno, Italian priest and religious leader (d. 1337)
- Isabella of Aragon, queen consort of France (d. 1271) (approximate date)
- Isabelle of Luxembourg, countess of Flanders (d. 1298)
- John II Avesnes, count of Hainaut and Holland (d. 1304)
- John of Montecorvino, Italian diplomat and bishop (d. 1328)
- Philippe de Rémi, French official and seneschal (d. 1296)
- Rashid al-Din, Persian statesman and historian (d. 1318)
- Robert FitzWalter, 1st Baron FitzWalter, English nobleman and knight (d. 1326)
- Todros ben Judah Halevi Abulafia, Castilian Jewish poet
- Yishan Yining, Chinese monk and calligrapher (d. 1317)
- Yolande II of Nevers, French noblewoman (d. 1280)

1248

- July 21 – Bogo de Clare, English cleric and writer (d. 1294)
- December 22 – Ichijō Ietsune, Japanese nobleman (d. 1293)
- Abu Said Faraj, Andalusian advisor and governor (d. 1320)
- Angela of Foligno, Italian nun, mystic and writer (d. 1309)
- Gao Kegong (or Fang Shan), Chinese painter (d. 1310)
- Hōjō Akitoki, Japanese military leader and poet (d. 1301)
- Kujō Tadanori, Japanese nobleman and regent (d. 1332)
- Peter John Olivi, French monk and theologian (d. 1298)
- Yeshe Rinchen, Tibetan Imperial Preceptor (d. 1294)
- Zaynab bint al-Kamal, Syrian female scholar (d. 1339)
- Approximate date – Blanche of Artois, queen and regent of Navarre (d. 1302)

1249

- July 9 – Kameyama, emperor of Japan (d. 1305)
- September 4 – Amadeus V, count of Savoy (d. 1323)
- December 26 – Edmund, English nobleman (d. 1300)
- Constance II of Sicily, queen consort of Aragon (d. 1302)
- Frederick I, margrave of Baden and Verona (d. 1268)
- Gaucher V de Châtillon, French nobleman (d. 1329)
- Humphrey VI de Bohun, English nobleman (d. 1298)
- John XXII, pope of the Catholic Church (d. 1334)
- Menachem Meiri, Catalan rabbi and writer (d. 1315)
- Richard of Middleton, Norman theologian (d. 1308)
- Robert III, Flemish nobleman and knight (d. 1322)
- Wu Cheng, Chinese philosopher and poet (d. 1333)
- Zhu Shijie (or "Hanqing"), Chinese mathematician

== Deaths ==
1240

- January 23 – Albert of Pisa, Italian Franciscan friar
- February 18 – Hōjō Tokifusa, Japanese nobleman and regent (b. 1175)
- February 24 – Egidia de Lacy, Lady of Connacht, Norman noblewoman
- March 6 – Sylvester of Assisi, Italian priest (b. 1175)
- April 11 – Llywelyn the Great, Welsh king of Gwynedd
- May 24 – Skule Bårdsson, Norwegian nobleman
- May 27 – William de Warenne, 5th Earl of Surrey, English nobleman
- after May 31 – Anastasia of Greater Poland, Polish noblewoman (b. 1164)
- June – Germanus II (Nauplius), patriarch of Constantinople
- July 22 – John de Lacy, 2nd Earl of Lincoln, English nobleman (b.1192)
- July 24 – Conrad of Thuringia, German Grand Master
- August 14 – Ludmilla of Bohemia, duchess of Bavaria
- August 31 – Raymond Nonnatus, Spanish cardinal
- October 13 – Malik Altunia, Indian governor and ruler
- November 16
  - Edmund of Abingdon, English archbishop (b. 1174)
  - Ibn Arabi, Andalusian philosopher and poet (b. 1165)
- December 6 – Constance, queen consort of Bohemia (b. 1180)
- Alan of Beccles, English clergyman and secretary (b. 1195)
- (or 1250?) Alexander of Villedieu, French teacher and poet (b. 1175)
- Conrad of Lichtenau, German nobleman and chronicler
- Fujiwara no Hideyoshi, Japanese waka poet (b. 1184)
- Guilhabert de Castres, French bishop and theologian
- Hartmann, Count of Württemberg, German nobleman and knight (b. 1160)
- John FitzRobert, English nobleman and knight (b. 1190)
- Tbeli Abuserisdze, Georgian scholar and writer (b. 1190)
- Thomas Moulton, English nobleman and knight
- Approximate date
- Infanta Branca, Lady of Guadalajara, Portuguese princess and nun (b. 1198)
- Caesarius of Heisterbach, German hagiographer (b. 1180)

1241

- March 17 – Köten, Cuman chieftain
- March 28 – Valdemar II of Denmark (b. 1170)
- March 31 – Pousa, voivode of Transylvania
- April 9 – Duke Henry II of Poland
- April 11 (killed in the Battle of Mohi):
  - Andrew, son of Serafin, judge royal
  - Izsép Bő, Hungarian nobleman
  - Ugrin Csák (b. c. 1190)
  - Gregory (bishop of Győr)
  - Nicholas I Gutkeled, ban of Slavonia
  - James (bishop of Nyitra)
  - Dominic I Rátót, master of the treasury
  - Matthias Rátót, archbishop of Esztergom (b. c. 1206)
  - Raynald of Belleville, bishop of Transylvania
  - Denis Tomaj, palatine of Hungary
- June 24 – Ivan Asen II of Bulgaria
- August 10 – Eleanor, Fair Maid of Brittany (b. c. 1184), princess long gently imprisoned in England
- August 22 – Pope Gregory IX
- September 20 – Conrad II of Salzwedel, German nobleman and bishop
- September 23 – Snorri Sturluson, Icelandic historian, poet and politician (b. 1178)
- September 26 – Fujiwara no Teika, Japanese poet
- November 10 – Pope Celestine IV
- December 1 – Isabella of England, Holy Roman empress, spouse of Frederick II, Holy Roman Emperor (b. 1214)
- Bernardo di Quintavalle, Italian follower of St. Francis of Assisi
- Mary, Countess of Blois (b. 1200)
- Nicholas Szák, Hungarian nobleman
- Buzád Hahót, Hungarian nobleman and Christian martyr
- Coloman of Galicia, Hungarian royalty, Prince (then King) of Halych, Duke of Slavonia (b. 1208)
- Ögedei Khan, 2nd Khagan of the Mongol Empire and successor to Genghis Khan (b. c. 1185)
- Baba Ishak, charismatic Turkman preacher (b. c. 1239)

1242

- February 10
  - Shijō (or Mitsuhito), emperor of Japan (b. 1231)
  - Verdiana, Italian noblewoman and saint (b. 1182)
- February 12 – Henry VII, king of Germany (b. 1211)
- March 26 – William de Forz, English nobleman (b. 1190)
- March 28 – Theoderich von Wied, German archbishop
- April 22 – Abubakar ibn Gussom, Arab poet (b. 1168)
- May 13 – Gerard of Villamagna, Italian hermit (b. 1174)
- May 15 – Muiz ud din Bahram, Indian ruler (b. 1212)
- June 26 – Thomas de Beaumont, English nobleman
- July 1 – Chagatai Khan, son of Genghis Khan (b. 1183)
- July 14 – Hōjō Yasutoki, Japanese regent (b. 1183)
- October 7 – Juntoku, emperor of Japan (b. 1197)
- November 12 – Jocelin of Wells, English bishop
- November 20 – Narchat, Moksha queen (b. 1216)
- December 2 – Al-Mustansir, Abbasid caliph (b. 1192)
- December 9 – Richard le Gras, English abbot and bishop
- December 26 – Hugh de Lacy, 1st Earl of Ulster, Norman nobleman (b. 1176)
- Aimeric de Belenoi, French cleric, troubadour and writer
- Archambaud VIII of Bourbon ("the Great"), French nobleman (b. 1189)
- Ceslaus, Polish nobleman, jurist and missionary (b. 1184)
- Da'ud Abu al-Fadl, Ayyubid Jewish physician (b. 1161)
- Enguerrand III, Lord of Coucy, French nobleman and knight (b. 1182)
- Muhammad Aufi, Persian historian and writer (b. 1171)
- Nuño Sánchez, Spanish nobleman and knight (b. 1185)
- Ogasawara Nagakiyo, Japanese samurai (b. 1162)
- Richard de Morins, English archdeacon and jurist
- Richard Mór de Burgh, 1st Baron of Connaught, Norman nobleman (b. 1194)
- Sasaki Yoshikiyo, Japanese nobleman (b. 1161)

1243

- January 17 – Herman V, German nobleman (b. 1180)
- January 19 – Konoe Iezane, Japanese nobleman (b. 1179)
- February 20 – Romano Bonaventura, Italian cardinal
- March 10 – Cyril III, patriarch of Alexandria (b. 1175)
- April 25 – Boniface of Valperga, Italian monk and bishop
- May 3 – Hawise of Chester, English noblewoman (b. 1180)
- May 4 – Hubert de Burgh, English Chief Justiciar (b. 1170)
- May 7 – Hugh d'Aubigny, English nobleman and knight
- June 4 – Constance, margravine of Meissen (b. 1212)
- June 26 – Dardin Shervashidze, Georgian nobleman
- August 16 – Stepan Tverdislavich, Russian posadnik
- October 15 – Hedwig of Silesia, Polish duchess (b. 1174)
- October 26 – Bernat Calbó (or Calvó), Catalan bishop
- Ermengol IX, Catalan nobleman and child ruler (b. 1235)
- Fujiwara no Reishi, Japanese empress consort (b. 1185)
- Haymo of Faversham, English priest and philosopher
- Indravarman II, Cambodian ruler of the Khmer Empire
- Maol Eoin Ó Crechain, Irish priest and archdeacon
- Margaret of Burgundy, countess of Savoy (b. 1192)
- Umm Assa'd bint Isam al-Himyari, Arab female poet

1244

- March 1 – Gruffud ap Llywelyn, Welsh nobleman (b. 1196)
- March 19 – Isnardo da Chiampo, Italian preacher and priest
- April 2 – Henrik Harpestræng, Danish physician and writer
- September 3 – Guala de Roniis, bishop of Brescia (b. 1180)
- October 24 – William Briwere, English bishop and diplomat
- November 18 – Ibn Abi'l-Dam, Syrian historian (b. 1187)
- December 5 – Joan, countess of Flanders and Hainaut
- Alexander de Stirling, Scottish nobleman and knight
- Baldwin III, Flemish nobleman and knight (b. 1198)
- Bouchard IV of Avesnes, French nobleman and knight
- Eleanor of Castile, queen consort of Aragon (b. 1200)
- James of Pecorara, Italian monk, cardinal and diplomat
- John Komnenos (Doukas), emperor of Thessalonica
- Manfred III of Saluzzo, Italian nobleman and knight
- Meir Abulafia (or Ramah), Castilian rabbi and writer
- Minamoto no Mitsuyuki, Japanese politician (b. 1163)
- Ralph de Neville, English archbishop and politician
- Robert of Strathearn, Scottish nobleman and knight
- Saionji Kintsune, Japanese poet and writer (b. 1171)
- Sophia of Saxony, German noblewoman and abbess
- Yelü Chucai, Chinese advisor and statesman (b. 1190)

1245

- January 27 – Ralph of Maidstone, bishop of Hereford
- January 28 – Giovanni Colonna, Italian cardinal (b. 1170)
- February 8 – John of la Rochelle, French theologian (b. 1200)
- February 15 – Baldwin de Redvers, English nobleman (b. 1217)
- March 22 – Roger I of Fézensaguet, French nobleman (b. 1190)
- July 22 – Kolbeinn ungi Arnórsson, Icelandic chieftain (b. 1208)
- August 19 – Ramon Berenguer IV, Spanish nobleman (b. 1198)
- August 21 – Alexander of Hales, English theologian (b. 1185)
- November 27 – Walter Marshal, English nobleman (b. 1209)
- December 4 – Christian of Oliva, bishop of Prussia (b. 1180)
- Adam of Harcarse, Scottish Cistercian priest and abbot
- Beatrice d'Este, queen consort of Hungary (b. 1215)
- Cletus Bél, Hungarian prelate, bishop and chancellor
- Diya al-Din al-Maqdisi, Syrian scholar and writer (b. 1173)
- Fujiwara no Tadataka, Japanese regent and monk (b. 1163)
- Guillaume le Vinier, French composer and poet (b. 1190)
- Ibn al-Salah, Syrian scholar, imam and writer (b. 1181)
- Isabel de Bolebec, English noblewoman and co-heiress
- Rusudan of Georgia, queen consort of Georgia (b. 1194)

1246

- February 25 – Dafydd ap Llywelyn, Welsh prince (b. 1212)
- April 15 – Peter González (Telmo), Castilian priest (b 1190)
- May 19 – Umiliana de' Cerchi, Italian noblewoman (b. 1219)
- June 4 – Isabella of Angoulême, queen consort of England
- June 15 – Frederick II, duke of Austria and Styria (b. 1211)
- June 16 – Lutgardis (or Lutgarde), Flemish nun (b. 1182)
- June 28 – Al-Mansur Ibrahim, Ayyubid governor and ruler
- September 20 – Michael of Chernigov, Kievan Grand Prince
- September 30 – Yaroslav II, Kievan Grand Prince (b. 1191)
- October 22 – Mieszko II (the Fat), duke of Kalisz-Wieluń
- November 3 – Robert de Bingham, bishop of Salisbury
- November 8 – Berengaria (the Great), queen of Castile
- Alice of Champagne, queen consort of Cyprus (b. 1193)
- Ednyfed Fychan, Welsh nobleman and knight (b. 1170)
- Elias of Dereham, English master stonemason designer
- Erard of Brienne-Ramerupt, French nobleman (b. 1170)
- Eva Marshal, Cambro-Norman noblewoman (b. 1203)
- Geoffrey II of Villehardouin, prince of Achaea (b. 1195)
- Henry Audley (or Aldithel), English nobleman (b. 1175)
- Hōjō Tsunetoki, Japanese nobleman and regent (b. 1224)
- Kaliman Asen I, ruler of the Bulgarian Empire (b. 1234)
- Kaykhusraw II, ruler of the Sultanate of Rum (b. 1221)
- Matteo Rosso Orsini, Italian nobleman and politician
- Muhammad Al-Makki, Arab ruler and explorer (b. 1145)
- Richard FitzRoy, illegitimate son of John (Lackland)
- Tello Téllez de Meneses, bishop of Palencia (b. 1170)
- Temüge (or Otgon), brother of Genghis Khan (b. 1168)
- Theodora Angelina, Byzantine noblewoman (b. 1190)
- Walter IV (the Great), French nobleman and knight
- Walter Stewart, Scottish politician and High Steward
- Wansong Xingxiu, Chinese Buddhist monk (b. 1166)

1247

- February 12 – Ermesinde, countess of Luxembourg (b. 1186)
- February 16 – Henry Raspe, landgrave of Thuringia (b. 1204)
- February 25 – Henry IV, duke of Limburg (House of Limburg)
- May 9 – Richard de Bures, French knight and Grand Master
- June 10 – Rodrigo Jiménez de Rada, Spanish bishop (b. 1170)
- July 8 – Mōri Suemitsu, Japanese nobleman and samurai (b. 1202)
- August 31 – Konrad I of Masovia, Polish nobleman (House of Piast)
- November 5 – Ogasawara Nagatsune, Japanese samurai (b. 1179)
- December 21 – Roger of Salisbury, bishop of Bath and Wells
- December 24 – Shōkū, Japanese Buddhist disciple (b. 1177)
- unknown date – Śārṅgadeva, Indian scholar, musicologist and writer (b. 1175)
- probable – William de Ferrers, 4th Earl of Derby, English nobleman and knight (b. 1168)

1248

- January 4 – Sancho II ("the Pious"), king of Portugal (b. 1209)
- January 18 – Fujiwara no Ritsushi, Japanese empress (b. 1192)
- February 1 – Henry II, Dutch nobleman and knight (b. 1207)
- February 9 – Al-Adil II, Ayyubid ruler of Egypt and Damascus
- February 18 – Taddeo da Suessa, Italian jurist and diplomat
- February 25 – Bolesław I of Masovia, Polish prince (b. 1208)
- March 27 – Maud Marshal, English noblewoman (b. 1192)
- April 9 – Hugh I of Châtillon, French nobleman and knight
- April 20 – Güyük Khan (or Kuyuk), Mongol emperor (b. 1206)
- June 19 – Otto III of Merania, French nobleman and knight
- August 7 – Giordano Forzatè, Italian religious leader (b. 1158)
- September 13 – Kunigunde, Bohemian queen consort (b. 1202)
- c. October 28 – Walter Mauclerk, English bishop, diplomat and Treasurer
- November/December – Richard Siward, English adventurer and knight banneret
- December 26 – Theobald Butler, Irish chief governor (b. 1224)
- Al-Qifti, Egyptian scholar, historian and biographer (b. 1172)
- Haraldr Óláfsson, Scottish ruler of the Kingdom of the Isles, drowned (b. 1223/4)
- Hermann von Buxhövden, Livonian prince-bishop (b. 1163)
- Ibn al-Baitar, Andalusian physician and scientist (b. 1197)
- John Blund, English archbishop and philosopher (b. 1175)
- Koga Michiteru, Japanese nobleman and poet (b. 1187)
- Richard Fishacre, English theologian and writer (b. 1200)
- Shams Tabrizi, Persian poet and philosopher (b. 1185)
- Subutai, Mongol general and military strategist (b. 1175)
- Yolande of Dreux, duchess consort of Burgundy (b. 1212)
- Probable date – John of Monmouth, Norman nobleman and knight (b. 1182)

1249

- January 15 – Archambaud IX, French nobleman
- March 9 – Siegfried III, archbishop of Mainz (b. 1194)
- April 16 – Contardo of Este, Italian nobleman (b. 1216)
- June 28 – Adolf I of the Mark, German nobleman
- July 6 – Alexander II, king of Scotland (b. 1198)
- July 19 – Jacopo Tiepolo, doge of Venice (b. 1169)
- August 31 – Rodrigo Díaz, Spanish prelate and bishop
- September 27 – Raymond VII, French nobleman (b. 1197)
- October 5 – Abu Zakariya Yahya, Hafsid ruler (b. 1203)
- November 22
  - As-Salih Ayyub, Ayyubid ruler of Egypt (b. 1205)
  - Geoffrey de Liberatione, Scottish cleric and bishop
- December 10 – Choe U, Korean military leader (b. 1166)
- December 18 – Conrad II of Reifenberg, German bishop
- Dōjonyūdō, Japanese nobleman and waka poet (b. 1196)
- Hugh X of Lusignan, French nobleman and knight (b. 1183)
- John I of Montfort, Breton nobleman and knight (b. 1228)
- Pietro della Vigna, Italian chancellor and diplomat (d. 1190)
- Robert I ("the Chaplain"), Scoto-Norman priest and bishop
- Song Ci, Chinese physician, judge and scientist (b. 1186)
- William of Auvergne, French bishop and writer (b. 1180)
- Wuzhun Shifan, Chinese monk and calligrapher (b. 1178)
