= 1244 =

1244 in various calendars
- Gregorian calendar: 1244; MCCXLIV
- Ab urbe condita: 1997
- Armenian calendar: 693; ԹՎ ՈՂԳ
- Assyrian calendar: 5994
- Balinese saka calendar: 1165–1166
- Bengali calendar: 650–651
- Berber calendar: 2194
- English Regnal year: 28 Hen. 3 – 29 Hen. 3
- Buddhist calendar: 1788
- Burmese calendar: 606
- Byzantine calendar: 6752–6753
- Chinese calendar: 癸卯年 (Water Rabbit); 3941 or 3734 — to — 甲辰年 (Wood Dragon); 3942 or 3735
- Coptic calendar: 960–961
- Discordian calendar: 2410
- Ethiopian calendar: 1236–1237
- Hebrew calendar: 5004–5005
- Hindu calendars
- Vikram Samvat: 1300–1301
- Shaka Samvat: 1165–1166
- Kali Yuga: 4344–4345
- Holocene calendar: 11244
- Igbo calendar: 244–245
- Iranian calendar: 622–623
- Islamic calendar: 641–642
- Japanese calendar: Kangen 2 (寛元２年)
- Javanese calendar: 1153–1154
- Julian calendar: 1244; MCCXLIV
- Korean calendar: 3577
- Minguo calendar: 668 before ROC 民前668年
- Nanakshahi calendar: −224
- Thai solar calendar: 1786–1787
- Tibetan calendar: ཆུ་མོ་ཡོས་ལོ་ (female Water-Hare); 1370 or 989 or 217 — to — ཤིང་ཕོ་འབྲུག་ལོ་ (male Wood-Dragon); 1371 or 990 or 218

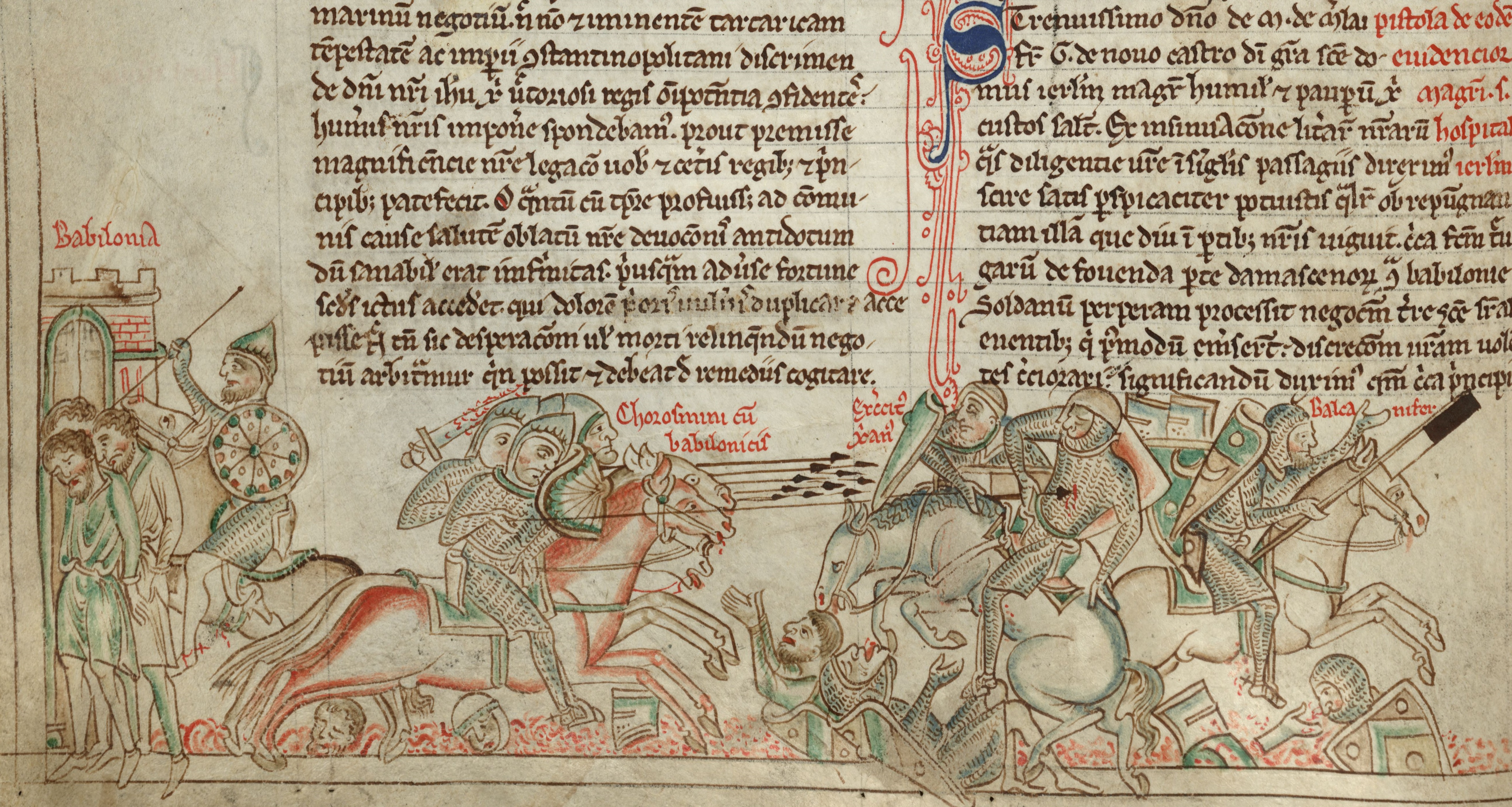
Battle of La Forbie by Matthew of Paris

Year 1244 (MCCXLIV) was a leap year starting on Friday of the Julian calendar.

== Events ==
=== By place ===
==== Europe ====
- March 16 – Siege of Montségur: French forces capture and destroy Château de Montségur in Languedoc, after a 9-month siege. Some 200 'heretics' (perfecti and credentes) are burnt in a bonfire, near the foot of the castle. This marks the final defeat of the Cathars (or Albigensians); the followers become scattered fugitives, meeting in forests and mountain wilds.
- March 26 – Treaty of Almizra: King James I (the Conqueror) and King Ferdinand III (the Saint) agree on the distribution of Muslim lands yet to be conquered. All lands south of a line, from the cities of Biar to Villajoyosa through Busot, are reserved for the Crown of Castile. This ends further Aragonese expansion on the Iberian Peninsula.
- December – King Louis IX (the Saint) falls desperately ill of a severe malarian infection. Near-death, he vows that if he recovers he will set out for a crusade. Louis' life is spared and as soon as his health permits him, he takes the cross and immediately begins preparations for the Seventh Crusade.

==== Levant ====
- June – Khwarazmian forces (some 10,000 men) invade Syrian territory, ravaging the land and burning the villages. As Damascus is too strong for a siege, they attack Galilee, past the town of Tiberias – which they capture. The Khwarazmians attack further southward through Nablus towards Jerusalem.
- July 15 – Siege of Jerusalem: Khwarazmian horsemen attack and sack the 'holy city' of Jerusalem. There is bloody fighting in the streets. The Khwarazmian force their way into the Armenian Quarter, where they decimate the Christian population, and drive out the Jews. The city is left in a state of ruin.
- August 23 – The Tower of David surrenders to the Khwarazmian forces. Some 6,000 Christian men, women and children march out of Jerusalem. As they move along the road toward Jaffa, they see crusader flags waving on the Walls of Jerusalem. Returning, some 2,000 of them are massacred.
- October 4 – The Crusaders assemble a force of some 1,000 cavalry and 6,000 men outside Acre, after hearing that Jerusalem is sacked by the Khwarazmians. They are joined by the Ayyubid forces (some 4,000 men) of Damascus and Homs – while Emir An-Nasir Dawud brings his army from Kerak.
- October 17 – Battle of La Forbie: A Crusader army (some 10,000 men) under Walter IV of Brienne and Ayyubid allies are defeated near Hiribya (or La Forbie) by Egyptian and Khwarazmian forces. The army is destroyed, with about 7,500 men killed. Walter and William of Chastelneuf are captured.

=== By topic ===
==== Religion ====
- June 7 – Pope Innocent IV is driven from Rome by imperial forces of Emperor Frederick II, and travels secretly in disguise to Sutri. Genoese galleys prepared by his relatives are waiting for him at the port of Civitavecchia to take him to Genoa.
- October 5 – Innocent IV flees to France and travels to Lyon, where he arrives on November 29. Although the city is nominally subject to the Holy Roman Empire, Innocent falls under the protection of Louis IX.
- December 27 – Innocent IV summons a general council to meet in Lyon (some 140 bishops eventually come) to attend what becomes later the First Council of Lyon.

== Births ==
- June 24 – Henry I of Hesse, German nobleman (d. 1308)
- June 25 – Ibn al-Fuwati, Arab historian and writer (d. 1323)
- Agnes Blannbekin, Austrian Beguine and mystic (d. 1315)
- Dai Biaoyuan, Chinese litterateur, poet and writer (d. 1310)
- Elizabeth the Cuman, queen consort of Hungary (d. 1290)
- Folquet de Lunel, French troubadour and writer (d. 1300)
- Guy de Montfort, English nobleman and knight (d. 1291)
- Heinrich II of Virneburg, archbishop of Cologne (d. 1332)
- Henry I (the Fat), king of Navarre (House of Blois) (d. 1274)
- Hong Dagu (or Charghu), Korean military leader (d. 1291)
- Ingeborg Eriksdotter, queen consort of Norway (d. 1287)
- John III of Prague, margrave of Brandenburg (d. 1268)
- Louis of France, French nobleman and regent (d. 1260)
- Margaret of Antioch, Outremer noblewoman (d. 1308)
- Otto III (or IV), German nobleman and knight (d. 1285)

== Deaths ==
- March 1 – Gruffud ap Llywelyn, Welsh nobleman (b. 1196)
- March 19 – Isnardo da Chiampo, Italian preacher and priest
- April 2 – Henrik Harpestræng, Danish physician and writer
- September 3 – Guala de Roniis, bishop of Brescia (b. 1180)
- October 24 – William Briwere, English bishop and diplomat
- November 18 – Ibn Abi'l-Dam, Syrian historian (b. 1187)
- December 5 – Joan, countess of Flanders and Hainaut
- Alexander de Stirling, Scottish nobleman and knight
- Baldwin III, Flemish nobleman and knight (b. 1198)
- Bouchard IV of Avesnes, French nobleman and knight
- Eleanor of Castile, queen consort of Aragon (b. 1200)
- James of Pecorara, Italian monk, cardinal and diplomat
- John Komnenos (Doukas), emperor of Thessalonica
- Manfred III of Saluzzo, Italian nobleman and knight
- Meir Abulafia (or Ramah), Castilian rabbi and writer
- Minamoto no Mitsuyuki, Japanese politician (b. 1163)
- Ralph de Neville, English archbishop and politician
- Robert of Strathearn, Scottish nobleman and knight
- Saionji Kintsune, Japanese poet and writer (b. 1171)
- Sophia of Saxony, German noblewoman and abbess
- Yelü Chucai, Chinese advisor and statesman (b. 1190)
