= 1180 =

1180 in various calendars
- Gregorian calendar: 1180; MCLXXX
- Ab urbe condita: 1933
- Armenian calendar: 629; ԹՎ ՈԻԹ
- Assyrian calendar: 5930
- Balinese saka calendar: 1101–1102
- Bengali calendar: 586–587
- Berber calendar: 2130
- English Regnal year: 26 Hen. 2 – 27 Hen. 2
- Buddhist calendar: 1724
- Burmese calendar: 542
- Byzantine calendar: 6688–6689
- Chinese calendar: 己亥年 (Earth Pig); 3877 or 3670 — to — 庚子年 (Metal Rat); 3878 or 3671
- Coptic calendar: 896–897
- Discordian calendar: 2346
- Ethiopian calendar: 1172–1173
- Hebrew calendar: 4940–4941
- Hindu calendars
- Vikram Samvat: 1236–1237
- Shaka Samvat: 1101–1102
- Kali Yuga: 4280–4281
- Holocene calendar: 11180
- Igbo calendar: 180–181
- Iranian calendar: 558–559
- Islamic calendar: 575–576
- Japanese calendar: Jishō 4 (治承４年)
- Javanese calendar: 1087–1088
- Julian calendar: 1180; MCLXXX
- Korean calendar: 3513
- Minguo calendar: 732 before ROC 民前732年
- Nanakshahi calendar: −288
- Seleucid era: 1491/1492 AG
- Thai solar calendar: 1722–1723
- Tibetan calendar: ས་མོ་ཕག་ལོ་ (female Earth-Boar); 1306 or 925 or 153 — to — ལྕགས་ཕོ་བྱི་བ་ལོ་ (male Iron-Rat); 1307 or 926 or 154

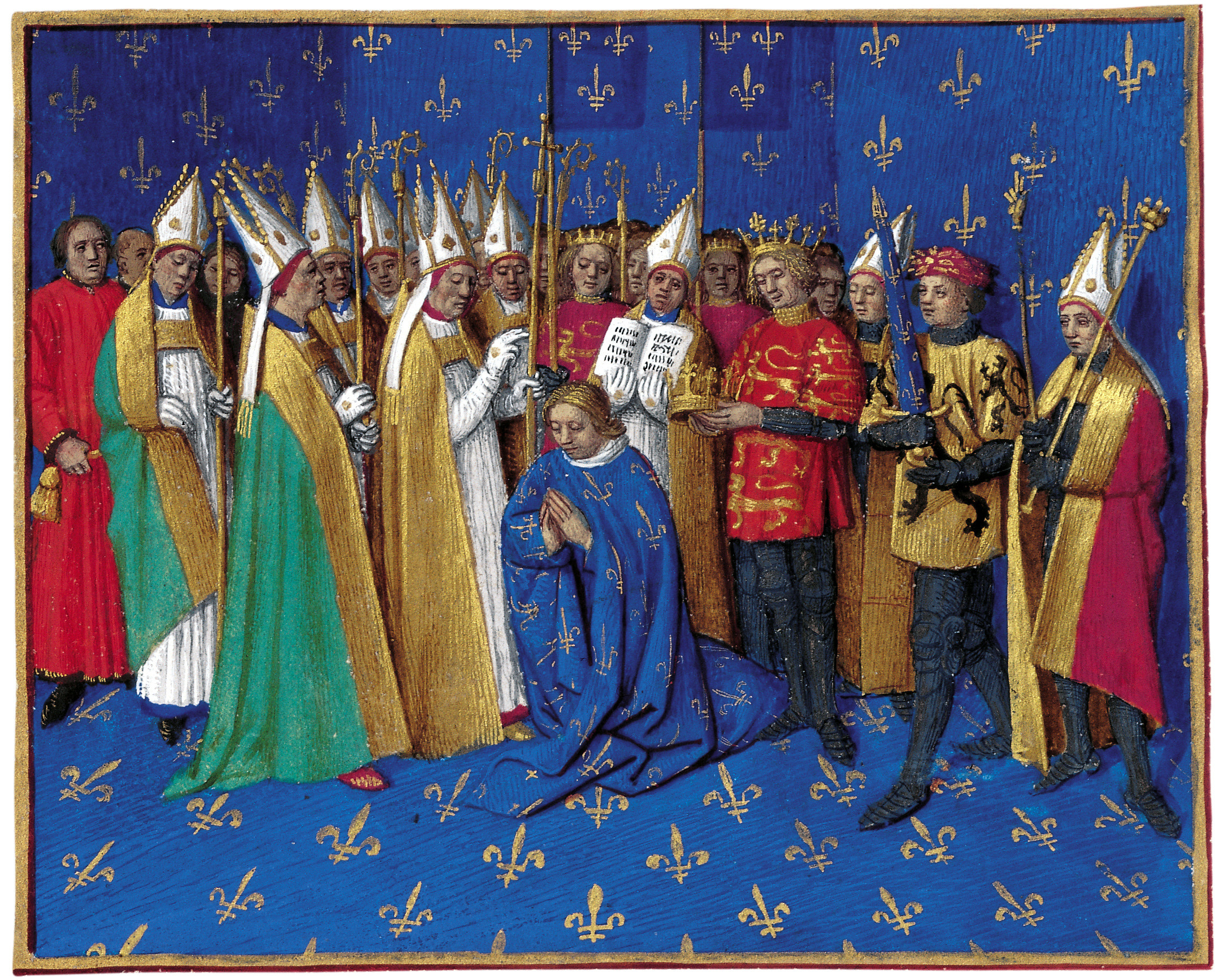
Coronation of Philip II (1165–1223)

Year 1180 (MCLXXX) was a leap year starting on Tuesday of the Julian calendar.

== Events ==
=== By place ===
==== Byzantine Empire ====
- September 24 – Emperor Manuel I Komnenos dies in Constantinople after a 37-year reign. He is succeeded by his 11-year-old son, Alexios II Komnenos, who will reign briefly as emperor of the Byzantine Empire under the regency of his mother, Maria of Antioch. Maria assumes power as regent (until 1183) and takes as her advisor and lover, Alexios Komnenos (protosebastos), a nephew of Manuel I, which causes scandal and unrest among the Byzantine populace.

==== Europe ====
- January 13 – Henry the Lion, Duke of Saxony and Bavaria, is stripped of his duchies and all his imperial fiefs at an Imperial Diet in Würzburg for violating the king's peace. On April 13, Emperor Frederick I Barbarossa issues the Gelnhausen Charter, formally dissolving Henry's former domains. A portion of Saxony is reorganized as the Duchy of Westphalia, while other territories are granted to his ally, Otto I the Redhead, Duke of Bavaria.
- September 18 – King Louis VII (called the Younger) dies in Paris after a 43-year reign. He is succeeded by his 15-year-old son, Philip II, who becomes sole ruler of France and reigns until 1223.
- Portuguese admiral Dom Fuas Roupinho defeats the Almohad fleet for the second time in two years.
- The assembly traditionally considered the first Sejm of the Kingdom of Poland is convened at Łęczyca (approximate date).

==== England ====
- The town of Portsmouth is founded by the Norman merchant Jean de Gisors, who establishes it as a strategic port to facilitate trade between England and France (approximate date).

==== Levant ====
- Summer – King Baldwin IV (known as "the Leper") sends envoys to Saladin proposing a peace treaty. Due to a severe drought, much of Syria is afflicted by famine, prompting Saladin to agree to a two-year truce. Although Raymond III of Tripoli initially denounces the agreement, he is forced to accept it following an Ayyubid naval raid on the port city of Tartus.
- Saladin intervenes in a conflict between the Zengids of Mosul and the Artuqids. He persuades the Seljuk Sultanate of Rum not to become involved and proceeds to raid Cilician Armenia.
- Baldwin IV arranges the marriage of his sister, Sibylla, to Guy of Lusignan, brother of the constable Amalric of Lusignan. Baldwin grants Guy the County of Jaffa and Ascalon as a fief.

==== Asia ====
- March 18 – Emperor Takakura is forced to abdicate by Taira no Kiyomori after a 12-year reign. He is succeeded by his two-year-old son, Emperor Antoku, who will reign until 1185. Kiyomori assumes control of the government, ruling as regent in the child emperor's name.
- Genpei War: Prince Mochihito launches a rebellion against the ruling Taira clan. In support of the uprising, Minamoto no Yorimasa issues a call to arms, appealing to several Buddhist monasteries—such as Enryaku-ji, Mii-dera, and others—that have been alienated by Kiyomori.
- June 20 – Battle of Uji: Prince Mochihito and Minamoto no Yorimasa take refuge in the Byōdō-in Temple. They appeal to warrior monks for assistance, but are ultimately defeated by Taira forces. Yorimasa commits suicide, and Mochihito is killed while fleeing.
- September 14 – Battle of Ishibashiyama: A Taira force of approximately 3,000 men, led by Ōba Kagechika, defeats Minamoto no Yoritomo near Mount Fuji (in present-day Odawara). Yoritomo narrowly escapes by sea and flees to Awa Province.
- November 9 – Battle of Fujigawa: Minamoto forces, numbering around 30,000 and commanded by Minamoto no Yoritomo, defeat a Taira army under Taira no Koremori near the Fuji River. The Taira forces retreat in disorder, though Koremori manages to escape.

=== By topic ===
==== Culture ====
- Alexander Neckam becomes a lecturer in Paris and begins writing De Natura Rerum, one of the earliest Western European works to mention chess (approximate date).

==== Demography ====
- Hangzhou, the capital of the Southern Song dynasty in China, becomes the largest city in the world, surpassing Fez in the Almohad Caliphate.

== Births ==
- August 6 – Go-Toba, emperor of Japan (d. 1239)
- Alfonso II (Berenguer), count of Provence (d. 1209)
- Berengaria (the Great), queen of Castile and León (d. 1246)
- Eric X (Knutsson), king of Sweden (approximate date)
- Fernán Gutiérrez de Castro, Spanish nobleman (d. 1223)
- Gilbert de Clare, English nobleman (approximate date)
- Guala de Roniis, Italian priest and bishop (d. 1244)
- Hawise of Chester, English noblewoman (d. 1143)
- Ibn Abi Tayyi, Syrian historian and poet (d. 1228)
- Kambar, Indian Hindu poet and writer (d. 1250)
- Paulus Hungarus, Hungarian theologian (d. 1241)
- Philip of Ibelin, Cypriot nobleman and regent (d. 1227)
- Raimbaut de Vaqueiras, French troubadour (d. 1207)
- Robert de Bingham, bishop of Salisbury (d. 1246)
- Robert of Burgate, English nobleman (d. 1220)
- Simon of Dammartin, French nobleman (d. 1239)

== Deaths ==
- January 23 – Eberhard I, count of Berg-Altena (b. 1140)
- January 29 – Soběslav II, duke of Bohemia (b. 1128)
- February 6 – Teresa Fernández de Traba, queen of León
- March 27 – Al-Mustadi, caliph of the Abbasid Caliphate (b. 1142)
- June 20
  - Minamoto no Yorimasa, Japanese military leader (b. 1106)
  - Mochihito, Japanese prince and son of Go-Shirakawa
- June 27 – Turan-Shah, Ayyubid emir (prince) of Damascus
- July 1 – Stephanie (the Unfortunate), Spanish noblewoman
- August 11 – William of Sens (or Guillaume), French architect
- September 18 – Louis VII (the Younger), king of France (b. 1120)
- September 24 – Manuel I (Komnenos), Byzantine emperor (b. 1118)
- October 6 – Amalric of Nesle, French prelate and Latin patriarch
- October 25 – John of Salisbury, English philosopher and bishop
- November 14 – Lorcán Ua Tuathail, Irish archbishop (b. 1128)
- Abraham ibn Daud, Spanish-Jewish philosopher (b. 1110)
- Abū Ṭāhir al-Silafī, Fatimid scholar and writer (b. 1079)
- John Tzetzes, Byzantine poet and grammarian (b. 1110)
- Joscelin of Louvain, Flemish nobleman (b. 1121)
- Raynerius of Split, Italian monk and archbishop
- Zhu Shuzhen, Chinese poet and writer (b. 1135)
