= Conrad II (disambiguation) =

Conrad II or Konrad II may refer to:

- Conrad II, Duke of Transjurane Burgundy (fl. 858–864, d. 876)
- Conrad II, Holy Roman Emperor (c. 990–1039)
- Conrad II, Duke of Carinthia (probably 1003–1039)
- Conrad II, Duke of Bavaria (1054–1055)
- Conrad II of Italy (1074–1101)
- Conrad II, Count of Luxembourg (died 1136)
- Konrad II, Count of Württemberg (died 1143)
- Conrad II of Dachau (died 1159)
- Conrad II of Znojmo (died 1161)
- Conrad II, Duke of Merania (died 1182)
- Conrad II of Bohemia (died 1191)
- Conrad II of Raabs (died 1191)
- Conrad II, Duke of Swabia (1191–1196)
- Conrad II, Margrave of Lusatia (died 1210)
- Conrad II of Salzwedel (died 1241)
- Conrad II (bishop of Hildesheim) (died 1249)
- Conrad II of Jerusalem (1228–1254)
- Konrad I, Duke of Głogów (died 1273), Konrad II of Silesia
- Konrad II of Masovia (died 1294)
- Conrad II of Teck (1235–1292)
- Conrad II the Hunchback (1252/65–1304)
- Conrad II of Freiburg (died 1350), Count of Freiburg
- Conrad II of Oldenburg (died 1401), Count of Oldenburg
- Konrad II the Gray (ca. 1340–1403)
