= 1186 =

1186 in various calendars
- Gregorian calendar: 1186; MCLXXXVI
- Ab urbe condita: 1939
- Armenian calendar: 635; ԹՎ ՈԼԵ
- Assyrian calendar: 5936
- Balinese saka calendar: 1107–1108
- Bengali calendar: 592–593
- Berber calendar: 2136
- English Regnal year: 32 Hen. 2 – 33 Hen. 2
- Buddhist calendar: 1730
- Burmese calendar: 548
- Byzantine calendar: 6694–6695
- Chinese calendar: 乙巳年 (Wood Snake); 3883 or 3676 — to — 丙午年 (Fire Horse); 3884 or 3677
- Coptic calendar: 902–903
- Discordian calendar: 2352
- Ethiopian calendar: 1178–1179
- Hebrew calendar: 4946–4947
- Hindu calendars
- Vikram Samvat: 1242–1243
- Shaka Samvat: 1107–1108
- Kali Yuga: 4286–4287
- Holocene calendar: 11186
- Igbo calendar: 186–187
- Iranian calendar: 564–565
- Islamic calendar: 581–582
- Japanese calendar: Bunji 2 (文治２年)
- Javanese calendar: 1093–1094
- Julian calendar: 1186; MCLXXXVI
- Korean calendar: 3519
- Minguo calendar: 726 before ROC 民前726年
- Nanakshahi calendar: −282
- Seleucid era: 1497/1498 AG
- Thai solar calendar: 1728–1729
- Tibetan calendar: ཤིང་མོ་སྦྲུལ་ལོ་ (female Wood-Snake); 1312 or 931 or 159 — to — མེ་ཕོ་རྟ་ལོ་ (male Fire-Horse); 1313 or 932 or 160

Year 1186 (MCLXXXVI) was a common year starting on Wednesday of the Julian calendar.

== Events ==
- January 27 – Constance of Sicily marries Henry (the future Henry VI, Holy Roman Emperor).
- John the Chanter becomes Bishop of Exeter.
- The Byzantine Empire recognizes the independence of Bulgaria and Serbia.
- Joscius becomes Archbishop of Tyre.
- Jayavarman VII, the king of Cambodia, founds the temple of Ta Prohm.
- After the death of the child-king Baldwin V, his mother succeeds him as Sibylla of Jerusalem, and appoints her disfavoured husband Guy de Lusignan king consort. This comes as a shock to Jerusalem's court, who had earlier forced the possible future Queen into promising that should she become so, she would not appoint him the title.
- The first nunnery is inaugurated in Iceland, the Kirkjubæjar Abbey.
- Caliph al-Nasir marries Princess Seljuki. Right after her betrothal to him, he brings her to live with him. He then sends an escort to bring her to Baghdad from Rum, consummates the marriage, and gives her priceless jewels and lavish gifts.

== Births ==
- May 18 – Konstantin of Rostov, Prince of Novgorod (d. 1218)
- November 7 – Ögedei Khan, third son and successor of Genghis Khan (d. 1241)
- date unknown or approximate
  - Checheyigen, second daughter of Genghis Khan (d. after 1253)
  - Queen Urraca of Portugal, wife of King Afonso II of Portugal (d. 1220)
  - Song Ci, Chinese physician and judge (d. 1249)
  - William III of Sicily (d. 1198)

== Deaths ==
- January 26 – Ismat ad-Din Khatun, wife of Saladin
- May 29 or June 23 or June 24 – Robert of Torigni
- June 1 – Minamoto no Yukiie, Japanese warlord
- August 19 – Geoffrey II, Duke of Brittany (b. 1158)
- August – Baldwin V of Jerusalem (b. 1177)
- September 29 – William of Tyre, Archbishop of Tyre (b. c. 1130)
- December 8 – Berthold IV, Duke of Zähringen (b.c 1125)
