= Robert of Burgate =

13th-century landowner, nobleman, and household knight

Robert of Burgate was a 13th-century landowner, nobleman, and household knight for John, King of England.

== Origins ==
Robert was born in about 1180, and was a minor knight who held two knighthood fiefs in Burgate, Suffolk. By 1205, the barony Honour of Eye was in the hands of the King John's half-brother William Longespée, 3rd Earl of Salisbury. That year, Robert and his squire William Talbot made a pledge of surety for the earl of two casks of wine. Robert was probably able to use his association with the Earl of Longsword as a stepping stone to the royal court.

== Career and family ==
In 1208, Robert acquired the Honour of Eye (presumably as an administrator) through his service to the royal household. Closely associated with the earl, he was frequently mentioned in documents. Robert was responsible for collecting the earl's monetary payment (known as a money fief) from the exchequer in 1210, and the earl was one of the men who vouched for Robert's ability to pay the 700 marks for his marriage to Gallena Dammartin. The king's half-brother, the Earl of Longsword's word carried weight; his decision to vouch for Robert implies that they were close.

By 1210, Robert helped the king pay imprests (petty cash) and wages for troops for the campaign in Ireland. Although he held a significant amount of land in Suffolk, he gained additional property there through his wife. Robert was also known to have had acquired several manors and estates for his service to the crown; during his career, he acquired the great house of Wascheth in Oxfordshire and the manor of Daventry.

Robert was the king's paymaster and commander of his sergeants in 1213, and was ordered to prepare for an expected French invasion. He was often employed to handle the king's financial matters. Robert was appointed castellan of Dover Castle from 1211 to 1213, although William Talbot may have been the de facto castellan.

Around 1215, he became part of a diplomatic mission to Otto of Brunswick. In 1216, Robert and fellow knights Engelram de Furnet and Gilbert de Sanes were given custody of Framlingham Castle (a confiscated rebel castle). He was ordered to return to the king's side, leaving the other two knights to manage the castle (presumably because Robert was one of the king's closest men). At some point in King John's reign, Robert was custodian of the archbishop of York and of the castle and Honour of Knaresborough during Brian de Lisle's brief estrangement from the king.

Robert married Gallena Dammartin Brewern, widow of John Brewer and heir of William de Dammartin, and they had three sons. He died in 1220, at age 40.
