= Isnardo da Chiampo =

Italian Roman Catholic priest (died 1244)

Blessed Isnardo da Chiampo O.P.
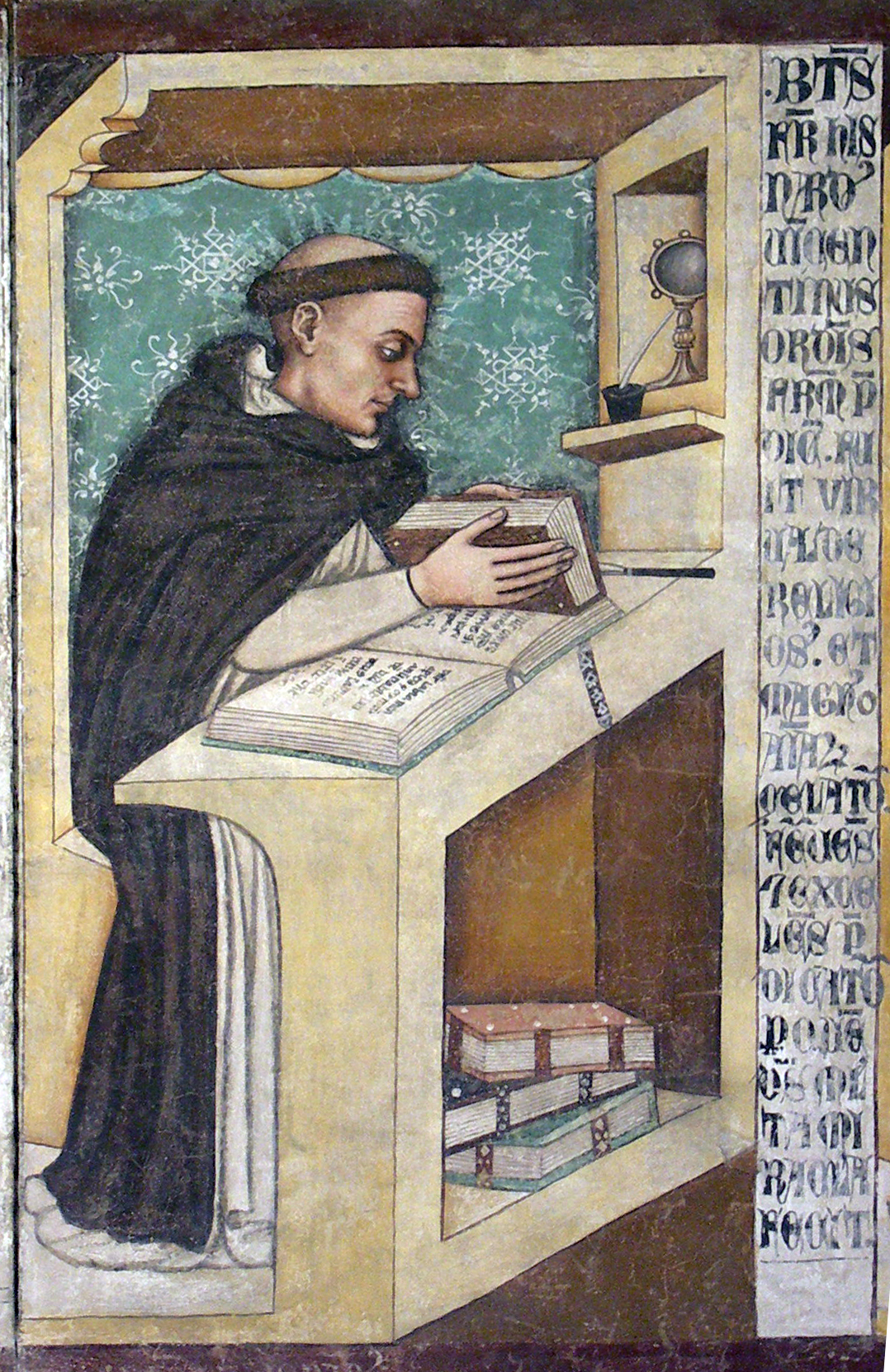
- Forty Illustrious Members of the Dominican Order

Priest
- Born: Chiampo, Vicenza, March of Verona
- Died: 19 March 1244; Pavia, Duchy of Milan
- Venerated in: Roman Catholic Church
- Beatified: 12 March 1919, Apostolic Palace, Kingdom of Italy by Pope Benedict XV
- Feast: 19 March; 22 March (Pavia)
- Attributes: Dominican habit
- Patronage: Chiampo

Isnardo da Chiampo, OP (d. 19 March 1244) was an Italian Catholic priest and professed member in the Order of Preachers.

He studied in Bologna (where Dominic of Osma himself received him into his order) and in Milan before preaching in northern Italian cities such as Brescia and Bergamo following his ordination. He settled in Pavia in 1231 where he founded a convent and would remain there preaching against heretics until his death over a decade later.

His reputation for holiness had been known throughout his life to the point it had extended into France; efforts to see him proclaimed a saint did not come to fruition until Pope Benedict XV beatified him on the account of his "cultus" (or longstanding veneration) on 12 March 1919.

== Life ==
Isnardo was born in Chiampo. It is said that he perhaps came from the noble Nardi house while others believe he was born to poor parents. It is also alleged that he might have belonged to the noble Isnardi house.

Isnardo entered the Order of Preachers around 1218. He received the order's habit in 1219 in Bologna from Dominic of Osma himself alongside his friend Guala de Roniis (who later became the Bishop of Brescia). Isnardo studied at the college in Bologna and was later sent to Milan in order to continue with his ecclesial studies. He spent a decade between Milan and Bologna and it is believed that he resided for most of that time at the San Eustorgio convent near Milan. He soon became a noted preacher and sought-after spiritual director following his ordination and his contemporaries lauded Isnardo for his pious and austere penances in addition to his staunch adherence to the Dominican Rule.

He founded in 1231 (at the invitation of Blessed Bishop Rodobaldo Cipolla) - and became the first prior for - the convent in Pavia that he titled Beata Vergine Maria di Nazareth in recognition of the profound devotion he had cultivated to the Blessed Mother. Isnardo preached against heretics who were spreading their beliefs throughout northern Italian cities and his increasing success in converting some resulted in his enemies resorting to ridiculing him and threatening them in their failed attempt to bring him to disrepute or to make him cease his preaching. He was noted for having been very overweight, to the point that his enemies mocked him for this while he went around travelling to preach. According to a hagiographic legend, one of his hearers mocked him for his corpulence, saying that it was impossible for him to believe in the sanctity of that friar, just as it was impossible for him to believe that a barrel could fly through the air by itself and break his leg. As soon as the words were out of his mouth, however, a barrel came flying through the air and fell on his leg, breaking it. It was often the case during his preaching that he would invoke the intercession of the Blessed Mother to protect the faithful. His reputation extended to France and canons from both Italian and French cities would ask him to preach in cities like Alessandria and Peschiera del Garda against the heretics; he also preached in Brescia where his friend was the bishop in addition to Bergamo and Sirmione. Isnardo also preached in Verona which was close to his hometown.

Isnardo died in his convent on 19 March 1244 knowing his end was growing closer over time; his remains lie in the Santi Gervasio e Protasio church in Pavia. Bishop Giuseppe Bertieri entrusted Isnardo's remains to that church in 1799 after putting them in public view for veneration prior to reburial.

== Beatification ==
His reputation for holiness had been noted throughout his lifetime and efforts to name him as a saint began not long following his death. But the cause to do this never gained significant traction which saw centuries elapse before notable progress was made. The Pavia diocese under Bishop Francesco Ciceri in 1907 made an official request to Pope Pius X to name him as a Blessed but the Congregation of Rites took over the investigation first.

The cause culminated on 12 March 1919 after Pope Benedict XV beatified him upon confirming that there existed a longstanding "cultus" (or popular veneration) attributed to the late friar.
