= 1286 =

1286 in various calendars
- Gregorian calendar: 1286; MCCLXXXVI
- Ab urbe condita: 2039
- Armenian calendar: 735; ԹՎ ՉԼԵ
- Assyrian calendar: 6036
- Balinese saka calendar: 1207–1208
- Bengali calendar: 692–693
- Berber calendar: 2236
- English Regnal year: 14 Edw. 1 – 15 Edw. 1
- Buddhist calendar: 1830
- Burmese calendar: 648
- Byzantine calendar: 6794–6795
- Chinese calendar: 乙酉年 (Wood Rooster); 3983 or 3776 — to — 丙戌年 (Fire Dog); 3984 or 3777
- Coptic calendar: 1002–1003
- Discordian calendar: 2452
- Ethiopian calendar: 1278–1279
- Hebrew calendar: 5046–5047
- Hindu calendars
- Vikram Samvat: 1342–1343
- Shaka Samvat: 1207–1208
- Kali Yuga: 4386–4387
- Holocene calendar: 11286
- Igbo calendar: 286–287
- Iranian calendar: 664–665
- Islamic calendar: 684–685
- Japanese calendar: Kōan 9 (弘安９年)
- Javanese calendar: 1196–1197
- Julian calendar: 1286; MCCLXXXVI
- Korean calendar: 3619
- Minguo calendar: 626 before ROC 民前626年
- Nanakshahi calendar: −182
- Thai solar calendar: 1828–1829
- Tibetan calendar: ཤིང་མོ་བྱ་ལོ་ (female Wood-Bird); 1412 or 1031 or 259 — to — མེ་ཕོ་ཁྱི་ལོ་ (male Fire-Dog); 1413 or 1032 or 260

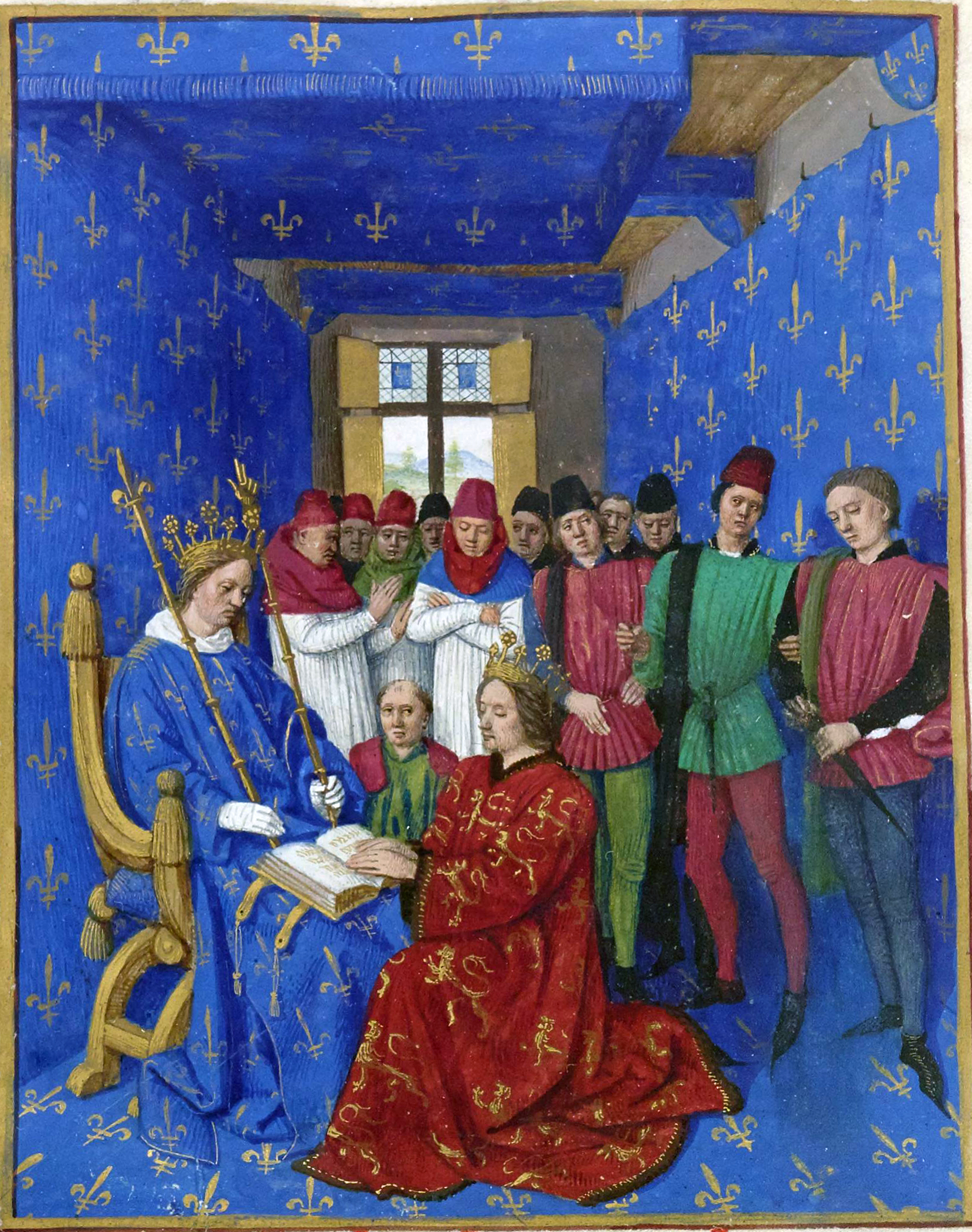
Edward I (kneeling) pays hommage to Philip IV as Edward is a vassal of him.

Year 1286 (MCCLXXXVI) was a common year starting on Tuesday of the Julian calendar.

== Events ==
=== By place ===
==== Europe ====
- January 6 – The 17-year-old Philip IV (the Fair) is crowned king of France at Reims. He settles the Aragonese conflict, and intensifies his predecessors' efforts to reform and rationalize the administration of the realm. Philip persists in reforms, which strengthen the monarchy's position in Europe. The gabelle – a tax on salt in the form of a state monopoly – will become immensely unpopular and grossly unequal, but persist until 1790.
- March 20 – Sultan Abu Yusuf Yaqub ibn Abd al-Haqq dies after a 28-year reign at Algeciras. He is succeeded by his son Abu Yaqub Yusuf an-Nasr, who becomes ruler of the Marinid Sultanate. Abu Yaqub makes a peace agreement with Muhammad II, Nasrid ruler of Granada, ceding all the towns previously occupied (except Algeciras and Tarifa). After confirming the peace with Castile on May 28, he leaves 3,000 men in the Peninsula.
- Old Prussians resettle in Samland and start an uprising against Teutonic rule (supported by the Principality of Rügen). The Prussians are defeated by the Teutonic Knights and forced to submit.
- The War of the Donkey is fought between the rival noble families of the Ghisi and the Sanudo, in the Duchy of the Archipelago in the Aegean Sea.
- The Guelph Republic of Siena allows exiled Ghibelline rebels back into the city.

==== England & Scotland ====
- March 19 – King Alexander III dies in a fall from his horse at Kinghorn in Fife, leaving Queen Yolande of Dreux's unborn child and the 3-year-old Margaret (Maid of Norway) as heirs to the throne. After Alexander's death, Scotland is governed by the nobility and clergy, known collectively as the Guardians of Scotland. This sets the stage for the First War of Scottish Independence.
- June – King Edward I (Longshanks) and Queen Eleanor of Castile travel to France. There they pay homage to Philip IV (the Fair) and attend to other matters. Edward travels around in the duchy of Gascony and orders the rebuilding of fortifications in the region (between 1286 and 1289).

==== Levant ====
- June 4 – The 15-year-old Henry II sails from Cyprus and lands in Acre, but is refused entry into the citadel. There, he stays for six weeks in the palace to negotiate an agreement to take over the city from the Angevins.
- August 15 – Henry II is crowned king of Jerusalem at Tyre. After the ceremony, he returns to Acre for the festivities. A few weeks later, Henry returns to Cyprus and appoints his uncle Philip of Ibelin as regent (bailiff).

==== Africa ====
- Abu Hafs Umar I, ruler of the Hafsid Sultanate, takes control of Béjaïa and becomes a rival of the main Hafsid entity based in Tunis.

==== Asia ====
- In the Lao kingdom of Muang Sua, King Panya Leng is overthrown in a coup d'état led by his son, Prince Panya Khamphong, which is likely to have been supported by the Mongol-led Yuan Dynasty in China.
- Kublai Khan makes plans for a final Mongol invasion of Japan, but aborts the preparations due to a lack of necessary resources.

=== By topic ===
==== Art and culture ====
- March 7 – The Catholicon, a religious Latin dictionary, is completed by John of Genoa.

== Births ==
- February 2 – Joan de Geneville, English noblewoman (d. 1356)
- March 8 – John III (the Good), English nobleman (d. 1341)
- June 30 – John de Warenne, English nobleman (d. 1347)
- September 4 – John de Mowbray, English nobleman (d. 1322)
- September 28 – Shōshi, Japanese empress consort (d. 1348)
- Alfonso de Castilla, Spanish nobleman and prince (d. 1291)
- Guy of Ibelin, Outremer nobleman and seneschal (d. 1308)
- Hōjō Mototoki, Japanese nobleman and regent (d. 1333)
- Hugh Despenser (the Younger), English nobleman (d. 1326)
- Ibn al-Akfani, Persian physician and encyclopedist (d. 1348)
- James Douglas, Scottish nobleman and general (d. 1330)
- John de Burgh, Irish nobleman and heir apparent (d. 1313)
- John Palaiologos, Byzantine prince and governor (d. 1307)
- Juana Núñez (Lady of Lara), Spanish noblewoman (d. 1351)
- Kalonymus ben Kalonymus, French-Jewish philosopher (d. 1328)
- Marco Cornaro, doge of Venice (House of Cornaro) (d. 1368)
- Odoric of Pordenone, Italian priest and missionary (d. 1331)
- William I (the Good), Dutch nobleman and knight (d. 1337)

== Deaths ==
- January 4 – Anna Komnene Doukaina, princess of Achaea
- January 5 – Zhenjin (or Chingkim), Mongol prince (b. 1243)
- February 17 – Luca Belludi, Italian friar and religious leader
- March 2 – Fujiwara no Ariko, Japanese empress (b. 1207)
- March 19 (or 18) – Alexander III, king of Scotland (b. 1241)
- March 20 – Abu Yusuf Yaqub ibn Abd al-Haqq, Marinid ruler
- April 20 – Buluqhan Khatun (or Bulugan), Mongol princess
- June 16 – Hugh de Balsham, English sub-prior and bishop
- July 5 (or 4) – Hartmann V, German nobleman and bishop
- July 30 – Bar Hebraeus, Syrian scholar and bishop (b. 1226)
- September 22 – Mugaku Sogen, Chinese adviser (b. 1226)
- October 3 – Fujiwara no Tameuji, Japanese poet (b. 1222)
- October 8 – John I (the Red), English nobleman and knight
- November 1 – Anchero Pantaléone, French cardinal (b. 1210)
- November 9 – Roger Northwode, English nobleman (b. 1230)
- November 22 – Eric V (Klipping), king of Denmark (b. 1249)
- December 15 – William de Warenne, English knight (b. 1256)
- Arlotto of Prato, Italian friar, Minister General and theologian
- Beatrice of Castile, daughter of Alfonso X (the Wise) (b. 1254)
- Bertram Morneweg, German merchant, traveler and councilor
- Ibn Sa'id al-Maghribi, Andalusian historian and writer (b. 1213)
- Jacob I (the Learned), Armenian cleric, catholicos and writer
- Pantaleone Giustinian, Latin cleric, papal legate and patriarch
- Pierre Coral, French monk, priest, abbot, historian and writer
- Reynold FitzPiers, English nobleman, High Sheriff and knight
- Sharaf al-Din Harun Juvayni (or Joveyni), Persian statesman
- Simon II of Clermont, French nobleman and regent (b. 1210)
- Sophia of Denmark (Eriksdotter), queen of Sweden (b. 1241)
- William of Moerbeke, Flemish philosopher and writer (b. 1215)
