= 1241 =

1241 in various calendars
- Gregorian calendar: 1241; MCCXLI
- Ab urbe condita: 1994
- Armenian calendar: 690; ԹՎ ՈՂ
- Assyrian calendar: 5991
- Balinese saka calendar: 1162–1163
- Bengali calendar: 647–648
- Berber calendar: 2191
- English Regnal year: 25 Hen. 3 – 26 Hen. 3
- Buddhist calendar: 1785
- Burmese calendar: 603
- Byzantine calendar: 6749–6750
- Chinese calendar: 庚子年 (Metal Rat); 3938 or 3731 — to — 辛丑年 (Metal Ox); 3939 or 3732
- Coptic calendar: 957–958
- Discordian calendar: 2407
- Ethiopian calendar: 1233–1234
- Hebrew calendar: 5001–5002
- Hindu calendars
- Vikram Samvat: 1297–1298
- Shaka Samvat: 1162–1163
- Kali Yuga: 4341–4342
- Holocene calendar: 11241
- Igbo calendar: 241–242
- Iranian calendar: 619–620
- Islamic calendar: 638–639
- Japanese calendar: Ninji 2 (仁治２年)
- Javanese calendar: 1150–1151
- Julian calendar: 1241; MCCXLI
- Korean calendar: 3574
- Minguo calendar: 671 before ROC 民前671年
- Nanakshahi calendar: −227
- Thai solar calendar: 1783–1784
- Tibetan calendar: ལྕགས་ཕོ་བྱི་བ་ལོ་ (male Iron-Rat); 1367 or 986 or 214 — to — ལྕགས་མོ་གླང་ལོ་ (female Iron-Ox); 1368 or 987 or 215

Year 1241 (MCCXLI) was a common year starting on Tuesday of the Julian calendar.

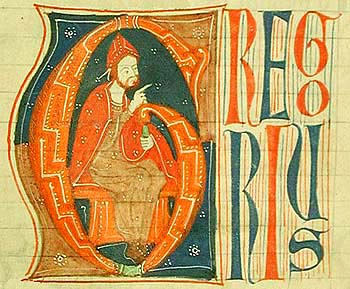
Pope Gregory IX

== Events ==
- March 18 – Battle of Chmielnik (Mongol invasion of Poland): The Mongols overwhelm the feudal Polish armies of Sandomierz and Kraków provinces, and plunder the abandoned city of Kraków.
- April 9 – Battle of Legnica: The Mongols, under the command of Baidar, Kadan and Orda Khan, defeat the feudal Polish nobility, including the Knights Templar.
- April 11 – Battle of Mohi: Batu Khan and Subutai defeat Béla IV of Hungary. The battle is the last major event in the Mongol Invasion of Europe.
- May – Battle of Giglio: an Imperial fleet defeats a Genoan fleet in the Tyrrhenian Sea.
- May 10 – Battle of Cameirge in Ulster: The Milesian Irish septs of the Ó Dónaills from Donegal, the Ó Néills from Armagh and the Ó Dochartaighs of Connacht defeat the last Tuatha Dé Danann sept, the Meic Lochlainn of Tír Eoghain and Inishowen under Domhnall mac Muirchertaigh Mac Lochlainn. From now on the Kings of Tír Eoghain will all be of the Ó Néill dynasty, Brian Ua Néill becoming sole ruler.
- Early northern summer – A succession crisis or other priorities results in the Mongols withdrawing behind their river barrier into Ukraine and the Russias, leaving Central Asian and far Eastern Europe peoples tributary to the Khanates, but leaving Poland and Hungary to begin recovery and reorganization.
- August 29 – After Henry III of England's invasion of Wales, the Treaty of Gwerneigron is signed by him and Dafydd ap Llywelyn, curbing the latter's authority and denying him royal title.
- September 23 – Snorri Sturluson, Icelandic saga writer, is murdered by Gissur Þorvaldsson, an emissary of King Haakon IV of Norway.
- December – Siege of Lahore (1241): The Mongols under Tair Bahadur besiege and sack the city of Lahore in the Delhi Sultanate.
- December 11 – Ögedei Khan dies after a drinking binge. His death halts the Mongol advance into Western Europe.
- Emperor Lizong of Song China accepts the Neo-Confucian teachings of the late Zhu Xi, including his commentary on the Four Books. This will have an impact upon the philosophical schools of surrounding countries as well, including Korea, Japan, and Vietnam.
- Livonian Crusade: The Estonian rebellion of 1237 is suppressed on Saaremaa Island, by the Livonian Order.
- The University of Valladolid is founded in Spain.

== Births ==
- September 4 – King Alexander III of Scotland (d. 1286)
- Eleanor of Castile, queen of Edward I of England (d. 1290)
- Sophia of Denmark, queen consort of Sweden (d. 1286)

== Deaths ==
- March 17 – Köten, Cuman chieftain
- March 28 – Valdemar II of Denmark (b. 1170)
- March 31 – Pousa, voivode of Transylvania
- April 9 – Duke Henry II of Poland
- April 11 (killed in the Battle of Mohi):
  - Andrew, son of Serafin, judge royal
  - Izsép Bő, Hungarian nobleman
  - Ugrin Csák (b. c. 1190)
  - Gregory (bishop of Győr)
  - Nicholas I Gutkeled, ban of Slavonia
  - James (bishop of Nyitra)
  - Dominic I Rátót, master of the treasury
  - Matthias Rátót, archbishop of Esztergom (b. c. 1206)
  - Raynald of Belleville, bishop of Transylvania
  - Denis Tomaj, palatine of Hungary
- June 24 – Ivan Asen II of Bulgaria
- August 10 – Eleanor, Fair Maid of Brittany (b. c. 1184), princess long gently imprisoned in England
- August 22 – Pope Gregory IX
- September 20 – Conrad II of Salzwedel, German nobleman and bishop
- September 23 – Snorri Sturluson, Icelandic historian, poet and politician (b. 1178)
- September 26 – Fujiwara no Teika, Japanese poet
- November 10 – Pope Celestine IV
- December 1 – Isabella of England, Holy Roman empress, spouse of Frederick II, Holy Roman Emperor (b. 1214)
- Bernardo di Quintavalle, Italian follower of St. Francis of Assisi
- Mary, Countess of Blois (b. 1200)
- Nicholas Szák, Hungarian nobleman
- Buzád Hahót, Hungarian nobleman and Christian martyr
- Coloman of Galicia, Hungarian royalty, Prince (then King) of Halych, Duke of Slavonia (b. 1208)
- Ögedei Khan, 2nd Khagan of the Mongol Empire and successor to Genghis Khan (b. c. 1185)
- Baba Ishak, charismatic Turkman preacher (b. c. 1239)
