= 1290 =

1290 in various calendars
- Gregorian calendar: 1290; MCCXC
- Ab urbe condita: 2043
- Armenian calendar: 739; ԹՎ ՉԼԹ
- Assyrian calendar: 6040
- Balinese saka calendar: 1211–1212
- Bengali calendar: 696–697
- Berber calendar: 2240
- English Regnal year: 18 Edw. 1 – 19 Edw. 1
- Buddhist calendar: 1834
- Burmese calendar: 652
- Byzantine calendar: 6798–6799
- Chinese calendar: 己丑年 (Earth Ox); 3987 or 3780 — to — 庚寅年 (Metal Tiger); 3988 or 3781
- Coptic calendar: 1006–1007
- Discordian calendar: 2456
- Ethiopian calendar: 1282–1283
- Hebrew calendar: 5050–5051
- Hindu calendars
- Vikram Samvat: 1346–1347
- Shaka Samvat: 1211–1212
- Kali Yuga: 4390–4391
- Holocene calendar: 11290
- Igbo calendar: 290–291
- Iranian calendar: 668–669
- Islamic calendar: 688–689
- Japanese calendar: Shōō 3 (正応３年)
- Javanese calendar: 1200–1201
- Julian calendar: 1290; MCCXC
- Korean calendar: 3623
- Minguo calendar: 622 before ROC 民前622年
- Nanakshahi calendar: −178
- Thai solar calendar: 1832–1833
- Tibetan calendar: ས་མོ་གླང་ལོ་ (female Earth-Ox); 1416 or 1035 or 263 — to — ལྕགས་ཕོ་སྟག་ལོ་ (male Iron-Tiger); 1417 or 1036 or 264

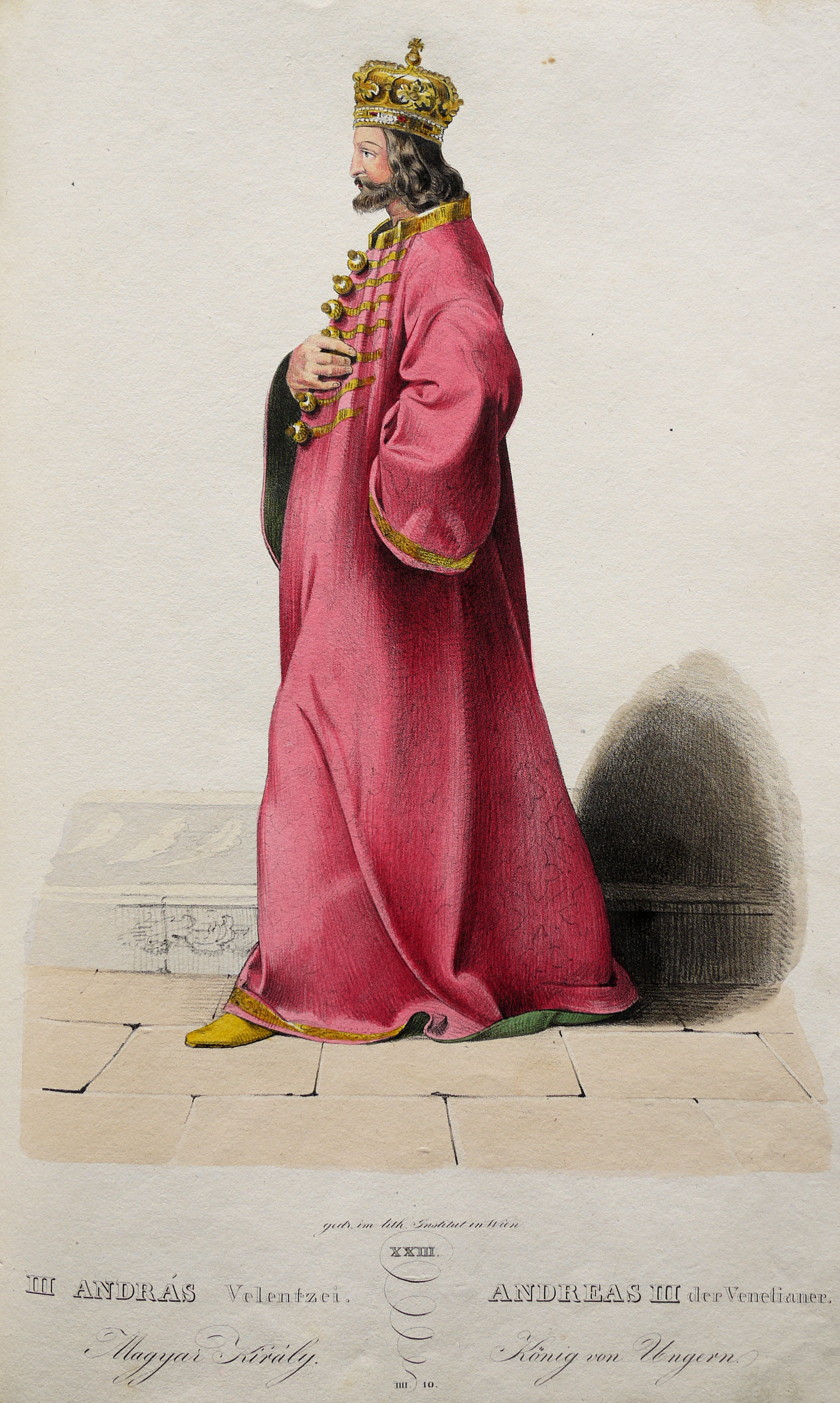
King Andrew III (r. 1290–1301)

Year 1290 (MCCXC) was a common year starting on Sunday of the Julian calendar.

== Events ==
=== By place ===
==== Europe ====
- July 10 – King Ladislaus IV of Hungary ("the Cuman") is assassinated at the castle of Körösszeg (modern Romania). He is succeeded by Andrew III ("the Venetian"), after an election by Hungarian nobles, who is crowned by Archbishop Lodomer as new ruler of Hungary and Croatia in Székesfehérvár on July 23.
- December 18 – King Magnus Birgersson of Sweden dies after a 15-year reign. He is succeeded by his 10-year-old son Birger Magnusson.

==== Britain ====
- July 18 – Edict of Expulsion: King Edward I of England ("Longshanks") orders all Jews (at this time probably numbering around 2,000) to leave the country by November 1 (All Saints' Day). The edict was decreed on Tisha B'Av on the Hebrew calendar, a day that commemorates many calamities. They are eventually allowed back in 1656.
- September – The 7-year-old Margaret, Maid of Norway, queen-designate and heir to the crown of Scotland, dies en route to the British Isles in Orkney, leading to thirteen competitors for the crown of Scotland, a succession crisis.
- November 28 – Eleanor of Castile, wife of Edward I, dies while traveling in the North. She has been suffering from illness for some time, and the cold and dampness of the winter months probably aggravate her condition.
- December – Edward I travels with the body of Queen Eleanor from Lincoln to London. Remembering his wife, Edward erects a series of crosses at each location that the body rests overnight. These are known as the twelve Eleanor crosses.
- Winter – The second of the Statutes of Mortmain passed during the reign of Edward I prevents land from passing into the possession of the Church.
- Quia Emptores, a statute passed by Edward I, puts an end to the practice of subinfeudations. The statute allows land to be sold according to royal approval, as long as the new owner answers directly to his lord or the king.

==== Levant ====
- June – Genoa concludes a new commercial treaty with the Mamluks; five galleys sent by King James II of Aragon ("the Just") join the Venetian Crusader fleet (some 20 ships) on its way to Acre. On board the fleet are Italian urban militias and mercenary forces under Seneschal Jean I de Grailly, who have fought for the Papal States in the so-called Italian Crusades.
- August – Italian Crusaders massacre Muslim merchants and peasants, and some local Christians in Acre. Some claim it began at a drunken party – others that a European husband found his wife making love to a Muslim. The barons and local knights try to rescue a few Muslims and take them to the safety of the castle, while some ringleaders are arrested.
- August 30 – Survivors and relatives of the massacre at Acre take bloodstained clothing to Sultan Qalawun ("the Victorious") in Cairo, who demands that the leaders of the riot be handed over for trial, but the nobles refuse to send them and Qalawun now obtains legal clearance from the religious authorities in Cairo to break the truce with Crusader states.
- October – Qalawun orders a general mobilization of the Mamluk forces. In a council, it is decided that a peace delegation be sent to Cairo under Guillaume de Beaujeu, Grand Master of the Knights Templar. However, Qalawun demands huge compensation for those killed in Acre, and sends a Syrian army to the coast of Palestine, near Caesarea.
- November 10 – Qalawun ("the Victorious") dies as the Egyptian Mamluk army sets out for Acre. He is succeeded by his eldest son Al-Ashraf Khalil as ruler of the Mamluk Sultanate. Khalil orders his allies and tributaries in Syria to prepare for a campaign next spring. Governors and castle commanders are ordered to assemble siege equipment and armor.

==== Asia ====
- June 13 – Shamsuddin Kayumars, Mamluk ruler of the Delhi Sultanate, is murdered and succeeded by Jalal-ud-din Khalji (or Firuz Shah I), founder of the Khalji dynasty, ending Mamluk rule and instigating the Khalji Revolution.
- September 27 – The 6.8 M_{s} Zhili earthquake affects the province of Zhili in China, with a maximum Mercalli intensity of IX (Violent), killing 7,270–100,000 people.

=== By topic ===
==== Art and Culture ====
- June 8 – Beatrice Portinari, muse of the Italian poet Dante Alighieri, dies in Florence. In his Divine Comedy (La Divina Commedia), he transforms his memory of Beatrice into an allegory of divine love.

==== Climate and Weather ====
- "Year without winter" – An exceptionally rare instance of uninterrupted transition, from autumn to the following spring, in England and the mainland of Western Europe.

==== Education ====
- March 1 – The University of Coimbra is founded in Lisbon by Denis I ("the Poet King"). He decrees that Portuguese is the official language of Portugal, replacing classical Latin in that capacity.

==== Literature ====
- The Dnyaneshwari is written in India. This holy book is a commentary on the Bhagvad Gita and is narrated by Dnyaneshwar.

== Births ==
- January 3 – Constance of Portugal, queen consort of Castile (d. 1313)
- January 6 – Otto Bodrugan, English landowner and politician (d. 1331)
- June 23 – Jakushitsu Genkō, Japanese Rinzai master and poet (d. 1367)
- August 4 – Leopold I, Duke of Austria ("the Glorious"), German nobleman (d. 1326)
- October 15 – Anne of Bohemia, queen consort of Bohemia (d. 1313)
- December 24 – Khwaju Kermani, Persian poet and mystic (d. 1349)
- Agnes Haakonsdatter, Norwegian noblewoman and princess (d. 1319)
- Andrea Pisano (or Pontedera), Italian sculptor and architect (d. 1348)
- Barlaam of Seminara, Italian cleric, scholar and theologian (d. 1348)
- Beatrice of Silesia, queen of Germany (House of Piast) (d. 1322)
- Buton Rinchen Drub, Tibetan Buddhist religious leader (d. 1364)
- Daichi Sokei, Japanese Buddhist monk, disciple and poet (d. 1366)
- Giovanni Visconti, Italian cardinal, archbishop and co-ruler (d. 1354)
- Guido Gonzaga, Italian nobleman and knight (condottiero) (d. 1369)
- Hugues Quiéret, French nobleman, admiral and advisor (d. 1340)
- Jacob van Artevelde, Flemish merchant and statesman (d. 1345)
- Jacopo Dondi dell'Orologio, Italian doctor and polymath (d. 1359)
- Johannes de Muris, French mathematician and astronomer (d. 1344)
- John Maltravers, English nobleman, knight and governor (d. 1364)
- John Parricida, German nobleman (House of Habsburg) (d. 1312)
- Jyotirishwar Thakur, Indian playwright, poet and writer (d. 1350)
- Ke Jiusi, Chinese landscape painter and calligrapher (d. 1343)
- Kitabatake Tomoyuki, Japanese nobleman and poet (d. 1332)
- Kujō Fusazane, Japanese nobleman, official and regent (d. 1327)
- Peter of Castile, Lord of Cameros, Spanish nobleman and prince (infante) (d. 1319)
- Pierre Bersuire (or Bercheure), French translator and encyclopaedist (d. 1362)
- Rabbenu Yerucham, French rabbi and scholar (posek) (d. 1350)
- Richard de Willoughby, English landowner and politician (d. 1362)
- Rudolf Hesso, Margrave of Baden-Baden, German nobleman (House of Zähringen) (d. 1335)
- Sesson Yūbai, Japanese Buddhist monk, priest and poet (d. 1347)
- Theodore I, Marquis of Montferrat ("Palaiologos"), Byzantine nobleman and writer (d. 1338)
- Willem van Duvenvoorde, Dutch nobleman and knight (d. 1353)

== Deaths ==
- January 28 – Dervorguilla of Galloway, Scottish noblewoman (b. 1210)
- February 3 – Henry XIII, Duke of Bavaria, German nobleman, co-ruler and knight (b. 1235)
- March 24 – John dal Bastone, Italian monk, priest and preacher (b. 1200)
- March 26 – John Kirkby, English bishop, vice-chancellor and statesman
- April 26 – Gaston VII, Viscount of Béarn ("Froissard"), French nobleman and knight (b. 1225)
- May 10 – Rudolf II, Duke of Austria, German nobleman (House of Habsburg) (b. 1270)
- June 8 – Beatrice Portinari, Italian muse of Dante (b. 1266)
- June 13 – Shamsuddin II, Mamluk ruler of the Delhi Sultanate (b. 1285)
- June 23 – Henryk IV Probus ("the Righteous"), High Duke of Poland (b. 1258)
- July 10 – Ladislaus IV ("the Cuman"), king of Hungary and Croatia (b. 1262)
- September 26 – Margaret, Maid of Norway, queen of Scotland (b. 1283)
- November 10 – Qalawun ("the Victorious"), Mamluk ruler of Egypt (b. 1222)
- November 28 – Eleanor of Castile, queen consort of England (b. 1241)
- December 18
  - Herman I, German nobleman (House of Henneberg) (b. 1224)
  - Magnus Birgersson, king of Sweden (b. 1240)
- December 21 – Gerhard I, Count of Holstein-Itzehoe, German nobleman, knight and regent (b. 1232)
- Adelaide, Countess of Auxerre, French noblewoman and ruler (suo jure) (b. 1251)
- Alice de Lusignan, Countess of Gloucester, French noblewoman (House of Lusignan) (b. 1236)
- Cecilia Cesarini (or Caecilia), Italian noblewoman and nun (b. 1203)
- Eison, Japanese Buddhist scholar-monk, disciple and priest (b. 1201)
- Elizabeth the Cuman, queen of Hungary (House of Arpad) (b. 1244)
- Fakhr al-Din Mustawfi, Persian finance minister, advisor and vizier
