= Siege of Lahore (1241) =

Siege during the Mongol invasions of India

- Part of the Mongol invasions of India
Date	21 – 22 December 1241 (Winter)
Location	Lahore, Delhi Sultanate (present-day Punjab region, Pakistan) 31°32′59″N 74°20′37″E
Result	Mongol victory: Malik Ikhtyaruddin Qaraqash fled before the city fell

Belligerents
Mongol Empire	Delhi Sultanate

Commanders and leaders
Tair Bahadur	Ikhtyaruddin Qaraqash; Dindar Muhammad †; Aqsanqar †

Casualties and losses
Unknown	Heavy
- Location of the siege on a map of modern Pakistan Lahore (South Asia)

The Siege of Lahore (Punjabi: لہور دا محاصرہ) took place on 22 December 1241, during the winter phase of the Mongol incursions into the Indian subcontinent. The siege took place in Lahore, a principal urban centre in present-day Pakistan, and involved forces of the Mongol Empire under the commanded of Tair Bahadur and the Delhi Sultanate, represented by Malik Ikhtyaruddin Qaraqash, the Sultanate's governor of Lahore.

Mongol involvement in the Punjab region began in 1221, following Genghis Khan's defeated of Jalal al-Din at the Battle of the Indus. Two tumens, totalling approximately 20,000 troops, were dispatched into the Punjab under the commanders Dorbei and Bala to continue the pursuit. The Mongol commander Bala followed Jalal ad-Din through the Lahore region, attacking the outlying province of Multan, and conducting raids in the surrounding areas of Lahore.

After 1235, a separate Mongol force invaded Kashmir, where a darughachi (administrative governor) was installed, and the region remained under Mongol suzerainty for several years. In the winter of 1241, Mongol forces again entered the Punjab and laid siege to Lahore, then under Delhi Sultanate control. The Mongol army employed siege engines to bombard the city's fortifications. Malik Qaraqash withdrew from Lahore prior to the main assault on 22 December 1241.

Following the capture of the city, Mongol forces killed a large number of inhabitants, enslaved others, and dismantled sections of the city walls. The Delhi Sultanate was unable to mount an effective response, owing to internal political instability and factional disputes. After sacking Lahore, the Mongol forces withdrew from the region.
