= Nichiken =

Japanese Buddhist monk (1243–1338)

- 日賢
- Title: 阿闍梨 (Acharya)

Personal life
- Born: 1243 Suruga Province
- Died: 1338 (aged 94–95)

Religious life
- Religion: Buddhism
- School: Nichiren Buddhism
- Monastic name: 淡路公 (Awaji-kō)

Senior posting
- Teacher: Nichiren

Awaji Nichiken (淡路日賢, 1243–1338) was a disciple of Nichiren who studied under Nichigen and founded Honjoji (本成寺) in Sanjō, Niigata in 1309. He was granted mandala 52 of the Nichiren Shonin Gohonzon Catalogue.

He is not to be confused with another Nichiken, born 1393, whose birth name was Daisuke Gakutō (学頭大輔).
