= Umm Assa'd bint Isam al-Himyari =

13th-century Arab Muslim female poet of Córdoba

- أم السعد بنت عصام الحميري
- Born: Cordova
- Died: 1243
- Writing career
- Pen name: Sa'duna

Umm Assa'd bint Isam al-Himyari (Arabic: أم السعد بنت عصام الحميري, died 1243) was a Muslim Arabic poet.

Umm Assa'd, also known as Sa'duna (Arabic: سعدونة), was from Cordova. Her poem 'I will kiss' has been translated into English, and is included in a modern bilingual anthology of classical poetry by Arab women.
