= Stepan Tverdislavich =

Posadnik of Novgorod (died 1243)

Stepan Tverdislavich (Russian: Степан Твердиславич) (died August 16, 1243), the son of Tverdislav, was a Novgorodian posadnik in 1230–43.

After 1220 Stepan merged into the Novgorodian political struggle. He showed himself as an adherent of the alliance with Vladimir-Suzdal princes, considering them helpful against Germans and Swedes. In 1230 Stepan arranged a coup to be elected posadnik. He managed to smooth the rivalry between the boyar factions, which facilitated Novgorodian victories over external enemies in 1234, 1240 and 1242.
