= Dai Biaoyuan =

Chinese litterateur

Dai Biaoyuan (Chinese: 戴表元; 1244–1310) was a Chinese litterateur of the early Yuan dynasty. He was able to write essays at seven, and his poems and essays were full of learned words. He obtained the jinshi degree during the late Southern Song period, then became a jiaoshou (professor, 教授) in Jiankang prefecture (建康府). In 1304, he was recommended as jiaoshou of Xinzhou (信州), but later resigned because of an illness.

Dai's poems showed his commiseration with the sufferings of the people, like his Song of Vine-gathering (采藤行). His other works gave expression to his yearnings of the vanquished Song dynasty.

== English translations ==
- Pgs. 15–20 in The Columbia Book of Later Chinese Poetry (1279-1911), by Jonathan Chaves, Columbia University Press (1986), ISBN 0-231-06148-X (note: his name is given in the Wade–Giles romanization as "Tai Piao-yuan".)
