= Treaty of Bordeaux (1243) =

1243 treaty between England and France

The Treaty of Bordeaux was a truce agreed to by King Henry III of England and King Louis IX of France on 27 April 1243, that ended the Saintonge War. The truce did not stop the on-going clashes between the two countries led to further tensions later.
