= Conrad II of Salzwedel =

- Died: 20 September 1241
- Noble family: Salzwedel
- Father: Frederick II of Salzwedel

Conrad II of Salzwedel (died 20 September 1241) was a German nobleman. He was a Roman Catholic priest and was bishop of Cammin as Conrad III from 1233 until his death.

== Life ==
Conrad II of Salzwedel was the son of the Vogt Frederick II of Salzwedel. He became a canon of Magdeburg in 1211. When Bishop Conrad II of Cammin died in 1233, Conrad II of Salzwedel was elected as his successor, at the instigation of his brother Jaczo I, Count of Gützkow. His election was due to the growing influence of Brandenburg in Pomerania. His election was confirmed by the Pope later that year, and he became bishop as Conrad III.

In the early years of his tenure, there was a border dispute between Pomerania and Mecklenburg about Circipania, when the Bishopric of Schwerin attempted to wrestle this territory away from the Bishopric of Cammin. Conrad III managed to retain Circipania, however, in the east he lost some territory to the Archbishopric of Gniezno. In 1240, he received Stargard from Duke Barnim I of Pomerania. In return, he invested Barnim I with the tithe over 1800 farms in the Uckermark, around Stargard and Pyrzyce.

Conrad died on 20 September 1241. After his death, there was an interregnum in Cammin, which lasted until 1244.

Conrad II of Salzwedel Salzwedel Died: 20 September 1241
Preceded by Conrad II	Bishop of Cammin; 1233-1241	Succeeded by William
