= Guala de Roniis =

Italian Catholic priest (1180–1244)

Blessed Bishop Guala de Roniis O.P.
- Bishop Emeritus of Brescia
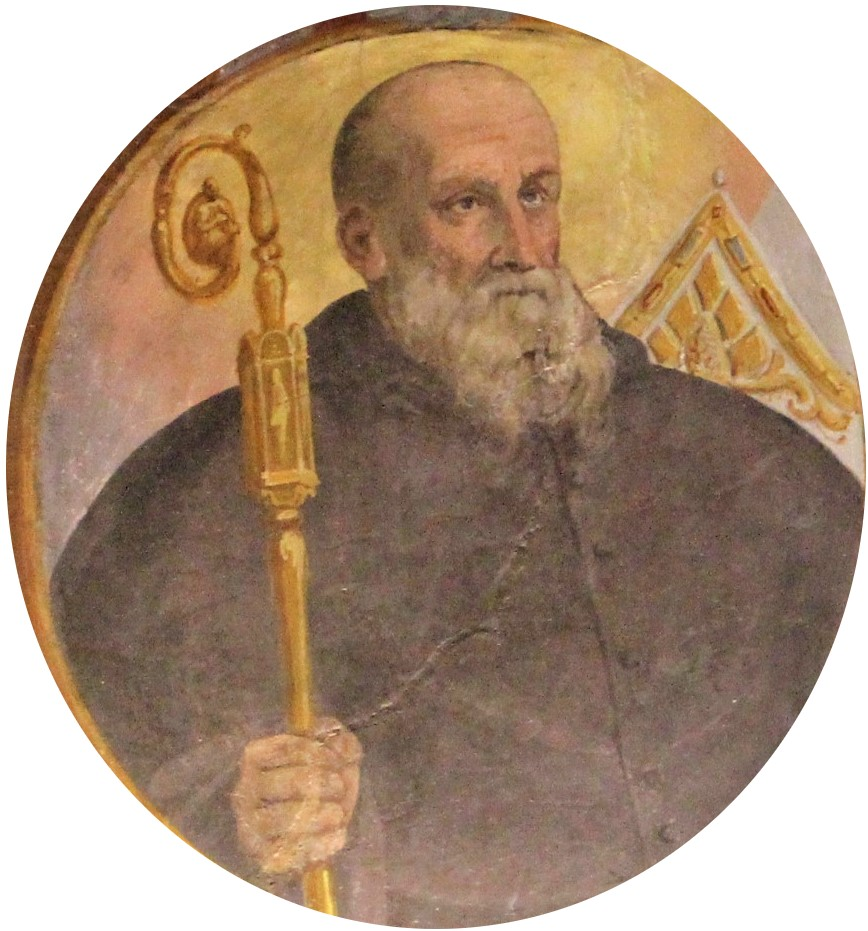
- Church: Roman Catholic Church
- Diocese: Brescia
- See: Brescia
- Appointed: 1229
- Term ended: 1239
- Predecessor: Alberto Razzati
- Successor: Elias Roberto

Orders
- Consecration: c. 1229
- Rank: Bishop

Personal details
- Born: Guala de Roniis; 1180 Bergamo, Commune of Milan
- Died: 3 September 1244 (aged 64) San Sepolcro d'Astino, Bergamo, Commune of Milan
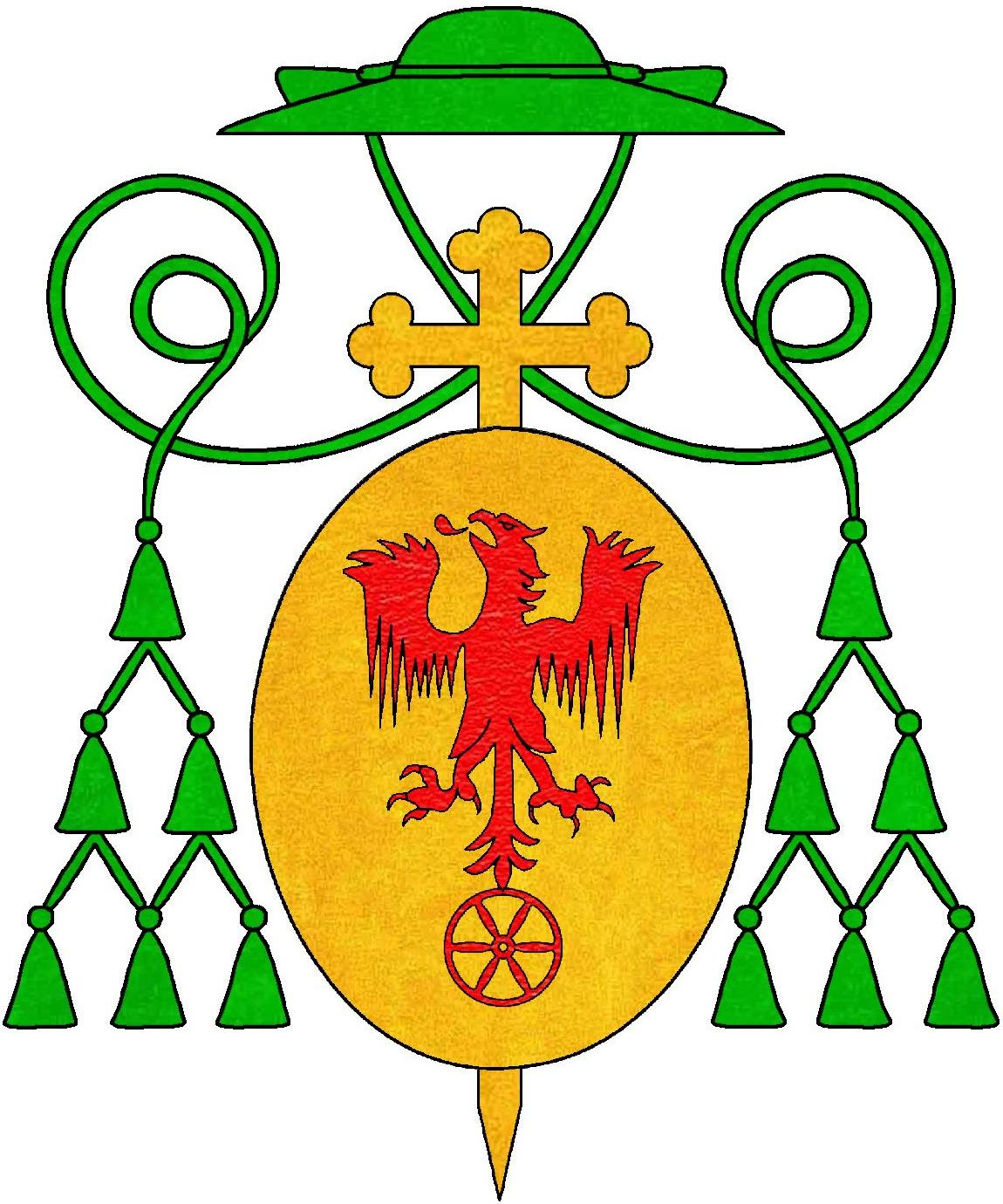
- Coat of arms

Sainthood
- Feast day: 3 September; 4 September (Ambrosian rite)
- Venerated in: Catholic Church
- Beatified: 1 October 1868; Saint Peter's Basilica, Papal States by Pope Pius IX
- Attributes: Episcopal attire; Dominican habit
- Patronage: Diocese of Brescia; Diplomats

Guala de Roniis (1180 – 3 September 1244) was an Italian catholic priest and a professed member of the Order of Preachers as one of Dominic of Osma's earliest disciples. De Roniis was born as a noble and was appointed as the Bishop of Brescia after Dominic's death though also served as a popular papal legate that earned him popular and papal support. He resigned from his episcopal see to dedicate the remainder of his life to peaceful solitude though his reputation for personal holiness prompted countless people to seek him out for his counsel.

The formal ratification to his local 'cultus' - or popular devotion to the late bishop - allowed for Pope Pius IX to confirm his beatification on 1 October 1868 while dispensing the requirement for miracles as cultus confirmation allows for.

== Life ==
Guala de Roniis was born in 1180, in the Bergamo province and belonged to a famed Roman house. His parents oversaw his initial education and his excellent progress caused his parents to entertain great hopes for his future while neglecting to entertain the thought that perhaps God had a surprise in store for their son and the course of his life.

He heard Dominic of Osma preach in 1219, and - like others - was so enchanted with Dominic's character that he was one of the first to seek him out for enrollment into his new Order of Preachers; he soon received the habit from Dominic himself and later received ordination as a priest. Dominic soon called the priest to Bologna in order to appoint him as one of four entrusted with the building of Saint Agnes' convent for Dominican nuns, but the project suffered a brief failure with the opposition of the parents of Diana degli Andalò. This slight setback caused him to return for a brief period to Bergamo. He served as one of the saint's first disciples and received the latter's appointment as the first prior of the order in Brescia where Dominic founded a convent for the town.

Both Theoderic of Apolda and Jordan of Saxony were his fellow contemporaries. De Roniis learnt of Dominic's death with tremendous grief in Brescia after seeing a vision. He had fallen asleep with his head against a church bell tower and saw a friar ascending a ladder into heaven where angels surrounded him - that friar was Dominic unbeknownst to him at the time. He was about to depart for Bologna when he learned that Dominic had died at the time of his vision.

The priorship of Saint Nicholas - now titled as Saint Dominic - in Bologna became vacant and the people there elected him to the position in 1226. But his tenure became difficult with tensions between Bologna and rival Mantua which prompted Pope Honorius III to appoint him as the papal nuncio to the two cities so that he might secure reconciliation between the warring towns; he managed to negotiate peace terms set for a decade. The new Pope Gregory IX then appointed him as the papal legate to Frederick II in order to induce him to keep his often broken promise to march on a crusade for the relief of the faithful in Jerusalem. On 20 July 1225, he oversaw the successful Treaty of San Germano in Cassino.

Brescia longed for his return and when the bishop of the diocese died the people pushed hard for the priest's appointment as the new bishop. De Roniis received his appointment in 1229 as the Bishop of Brescia from Gregory IX (he was reluctant to accept) and he received his episcopal consecration not long after this appointment was made public. A core objective of his episcopate was the temporal care of children. But the pontiff also made him an apostolic delegate to both Treviso and Padua when the two were at odds with each other - despite putting the new bishop far from his flock - and it was he who conducted successful peace negotiations. He resigned from his episcopal see in 1242 (after receiving papal approval to do so) due to civil unrest and then retreated to San Sepolcro d'Astino where, despite his retreat into peaceful solitude, people still flocked to see him in order to seek his wise counsel.

De Roniis died on 3 September 1244. His remains are now under the altar of Saint Martin in a Benedictine church.

== Beatification ==
The formal ratification of the local 'cultus' - or popular devotion - for the late bishop allowed for Pope Pius IX to issue formal confirmation of his beatification on 1 October 1868.
