= Gaelic warfare =

Warfare practiced by Gaelic peoples

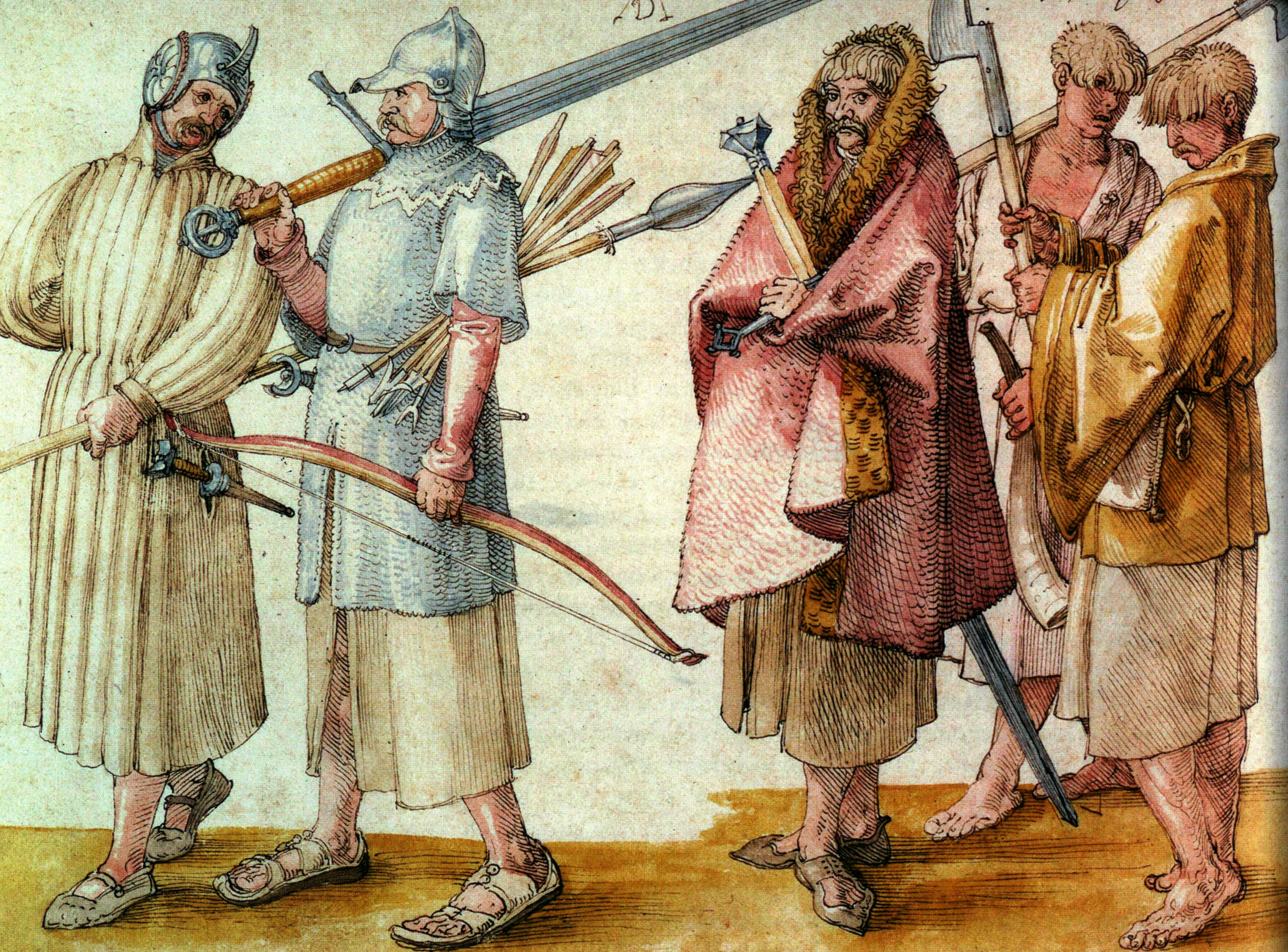
Irish gallowglass and kern. Drawing by Albrecht Dürer, 1521.

Gaelic warfare was the type of warfare practiced by the Gaelic peoples (the Irish, Scottish, and Manx) in the pre-modern period.

== Indigenous Gaelic warfare ==
=== Weaponry ===
Irish warfare was for centuries centered on the Ceithearn, or Kern in English (and so pronounced in Gaelic), light skirmishing infantry who harried the enemy with missiles before charging. John Dymmok, serving under Elizabeth I's lord-lieutenant of Ireland, described the kerns as:

"... A kind of footman, slightly armed with a sword, a target (round shield) of wood, or a bow and sheaf of arrows with barbed heads, or else three darts, which they cast with a wonderful facility and nearness..."

For centuries, the backbone of any Gaelic Irish army was these lightly armed foot soldiers. Ceithearn were usually armed with a spear (gae) or sword (claideamh), long dagger (scian), bow (bogha) and a set of javelins, or darts (gá-ín).

The use of armoured infantry in Gaelic Ireland from the 9th century on came as a counter to the mail-clad Vikings. The arrival of the heavily armoured Norse-Gaelic mercenary Gallowglasses in the early 13th century, was in response to the Norman invasion of Ireland and the Anglo-Normans use of heavily armoured Men-at-arms and Knights.

These adaptations and developments brought regular use of other weapons such as lances, poleaxes like the dane axe, lochaber axe, sparth axe and swords like the arming sword and two-handed swords similar to the Scottish Claymore. Many of the medieval swords found in Ireland today are unlikely to be of native manufacture given many of the pommels and cross-guard decoration is not of Gaelic origin.

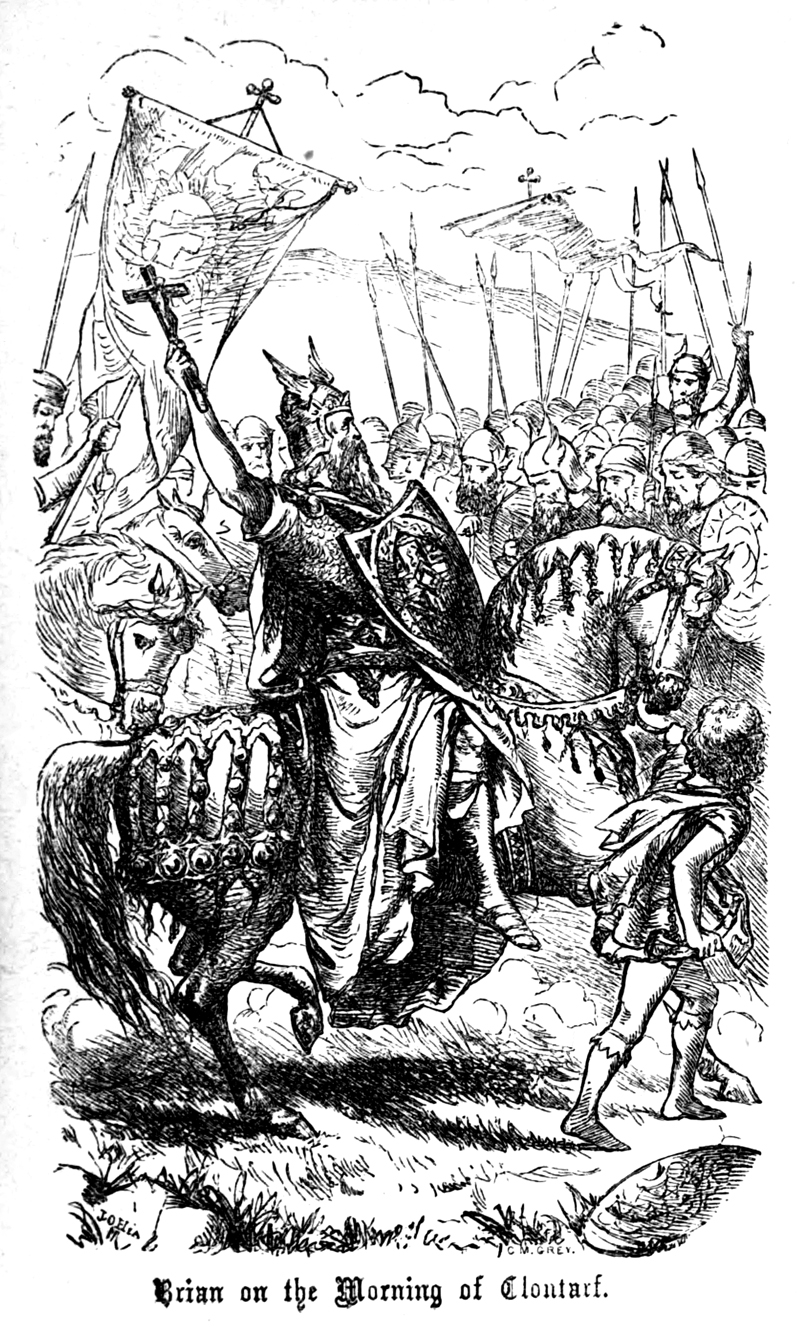
Brian Bóruma leading his army on the morning of the Battle of Clontarf.

By the time of Brian Bóruma and Máel Sechnaill, Irish kings were taking large armies on campaign over long distances and using naval forces in tandem with land forces. From the 11th century on, kings maintained small permanent fighting forces known as lucht tighe "troops of the household", who were often given houses and land on the king's mensal land. These were well-trained and equipped professional soldiers made up of infantry and cavalry.

Aside from Hobelars, who were highly mobile, lightly armoured, cavalry skirmishers and archers, used primarily for scouting and ambushes, the main Gaelic cavalry was usually made up of a king or chieftain and his clan. They usually rode without saddles but wore armour and iron helmets and wielded swords, skenes and long spears or lances. A fully outfitted medieval Irish army would have included light infantry, heavy infantry and mixed cavalry.

Gaelic Warfare was anything but stagnant and was adaptive and ever-changing. By the time of the Tudor reconquest of Ireland and the beginning of the end of the Gaelic era, the Irish had adopted continental "pike and shot" formations like those used by the continental armies of the Spanish, Swiss and Germans. With formations consisting of pikemen mixed with musketeers and swordsmen. Indeed, from 1593 to 1601, the Gaelic Irish fought with the most up-to-date methods of warfare, including full reliance on firearms and modern military tactics.

=== Gaelic raid culture ===
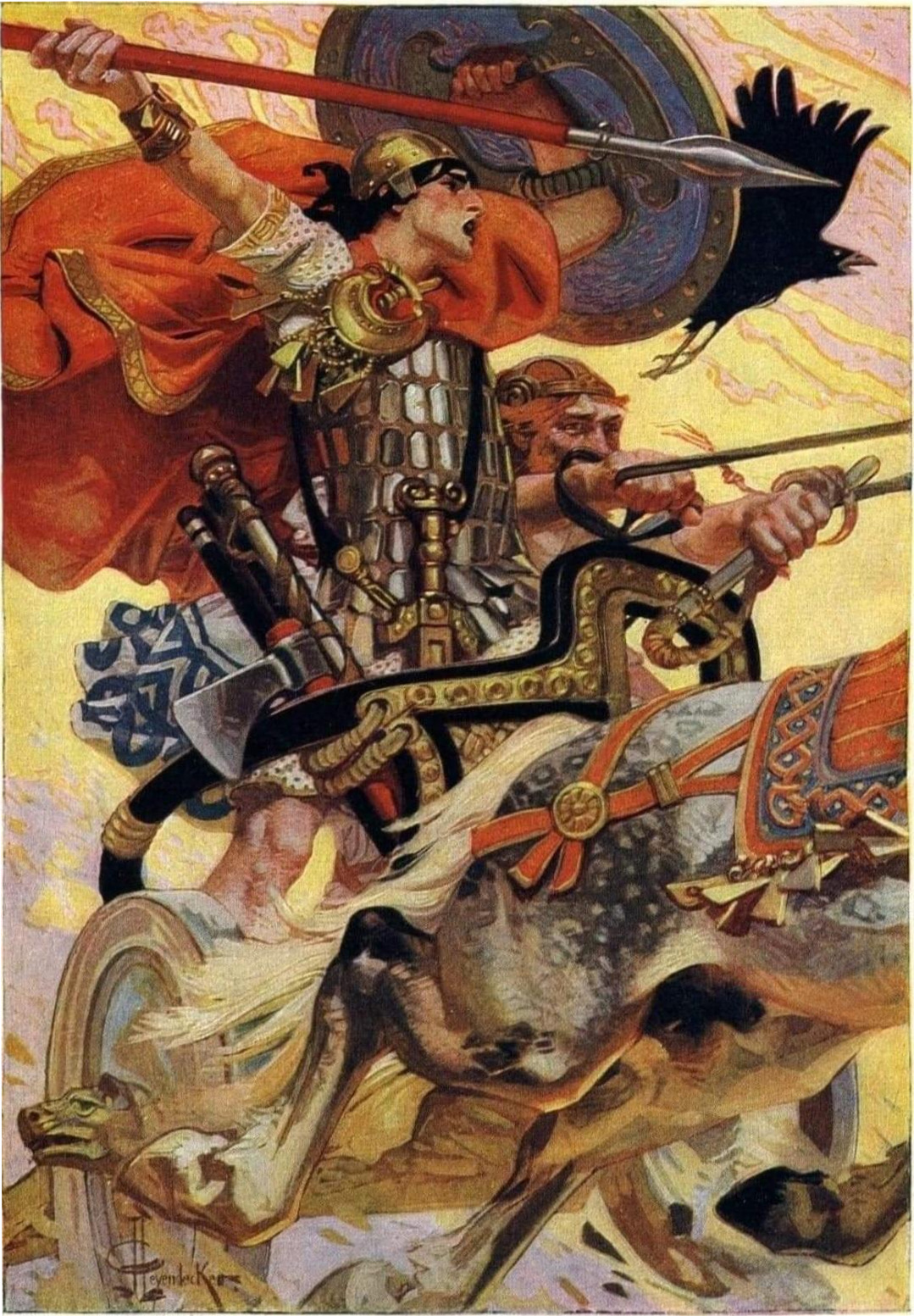
Cú Chulainn in Battle, illustration by J. C. Leyendecker in T. W. Rolleston's Myths & Legends of the Celtic Race, 1911. An artistic depiction of Iron Age Chariot warfare, though archaeological evidence of chariots have not been found in Ireland.

The Gaelic Irish preferred hit-and-run tactics and shock tactics like ambushes and raids (the crech), which involved catching the enemy unaware. One of the most common causes of conflict in Gaelic Ireland was cattle raiding. Cattle were the main form of wealth in Gaelic Ireland, as it was in many parts of Europe, as currency had not yet been introduced, and the aim of most wars was the capture of the enemy's cattle. If this worked, the raiders would then seize any valuables (mainly livestock) and potentially valuable hostages, burn the crops, and escape.

Indeed, cattle raiding was a social institution within Gaelic culture and newly crowned kings would carry out raids on traditional rivals upon coronation. The Gaelic term creach rígh, or "king's raid", was used to describe the event, implying it was a customary tradition.

The cattle raid was often called a Táin Bó and was an important aspect of Gaelic literature and culture, with the Táin Bó Cúailnge and Táin Bó Flidhais as important examples. Gaelic warfare was anything but static, as Gaelic soldiers frequently looted or bought the newest and most effective weaponry. Although hit-and-run raiding was the preferred Gaelic tactic in the Middle Ages, there were also pitched battles to settle larger disputes.

Particularly following the arrival of the Vikings from Lochlann, who brought their own style of raiding, warfare and settlements. Over time, these foreign newcomers established themselves, founding their own kingdom in Dublin, establishing a dynastic line and developing a distinct Norse-Gaelic culture of their own.

=== Armour ===
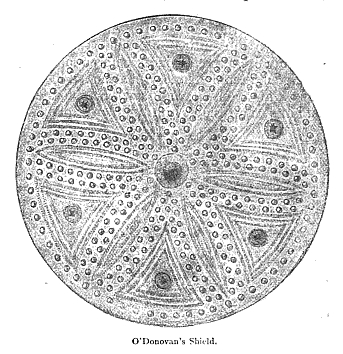
Irish round shield.

It's often stated that for the most part, the Gaelic Irish fought without armour, instead wearing saffron coloured belted tunics called léine (pronounced 'laynuh'), the plural being léinte (pronounced 'layntuh/laynchuh'). According to Gerald of Wales, who wrote propaganda (in the early 12th century), the Gaels preferred not to wear armour, as they deemed it burdensome to wear and one to be "brave and honourable" to fight without it. Armour was usually a simple affair: the poorest might have worn padded coats, the wealthier might have worn boiled leather armour called cuir bouilli, and the wealthiest might have had access to bronze chest plates, padded textile armour or maybe perhaps mail or scale armours (though they did exist in Ireland, they were quite rare). However, this appears to be all incorrect as the Irish did have heavily armoured knights, as mentioned in the Visio Tnugdali long before the gallowglass came to Ireland. Gallowglass mercenaries of the early 13th century have been depicted as having worn mail tunics and steel burgonet helmets but the overall majority of Gaelic warriors would have been protected only by a small shield. Gaelic shields were usually round, with a spindle-shaped boss, though later the regular iron boss models were introduced by the Anglo-Saxons, Vikings and Normans. A few shields were also oval in shape or square, but most of the native shields were small and round, like bucklers, to better enable agility and a quick escape.

=== Customs ===
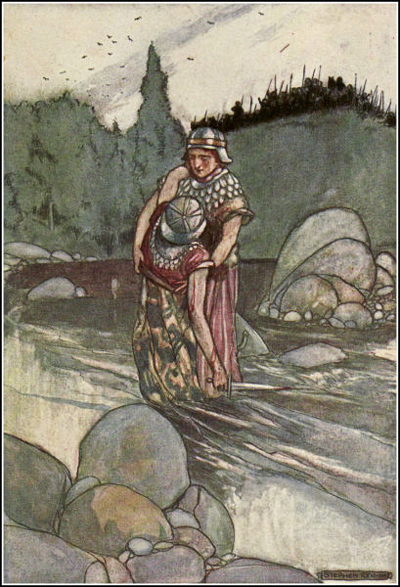
A depiction of Cú Chulainn slaying Ferdiad during champion warfare from the Ulster cycle of Irish mythology. Illustration by Stephen Reid from Eleanor Hull's The Boys' Cuchulain, 1904.

Clan warfare was an important aspect of life in Gaelic Ireland, especially before the Viking Age, when Vikings brought new forms of technology, culture, warfare and settlements to Ireland.

Before the Viking Age, there was a heavy importance placed on Gaelic clan wars and ritual combat. Another very important aspect of Gaelic ritual warfare at this time was single combat. In order to settle a dispute or merely to measure one's prowess, it was customary to challenge another individual warrior from the other army to ritual single combat to the death, while being cheered on by the opposing hosts.

Champion warfare was an important aspect of Irish mythology, literature, and culture, particularly in the Ulster cycle with Cú Chulainn and the Táin Bó Cúailnge, where the hero from Ulster defeats an entire army from Connacht one by one. Such single combats were common before a pitched battle, and for ritual purposes they tended to occur at river fords.

The spirit and traditions of single combat would live on and manifest themselves in other ways in Modern Gaelic cultures. In Scotland with events like Scottish Wrestling, the Highland Games and Scottish Martial Arts like the dueling of the 18th century, where the victor was determined by who made the first cut. However, this was not always observed, and at times the duel would continue to the death. In Ireland, the spirit of ritual combat has also manifested itself as single combat style sporting events and Irish martial arts such as Irish boxing (Dornálaíocht), Irish wrestling (Barróg), stick fighting (Bataireacht) and scuffling (Coiléar agus Uille).

=== Urban defense ===
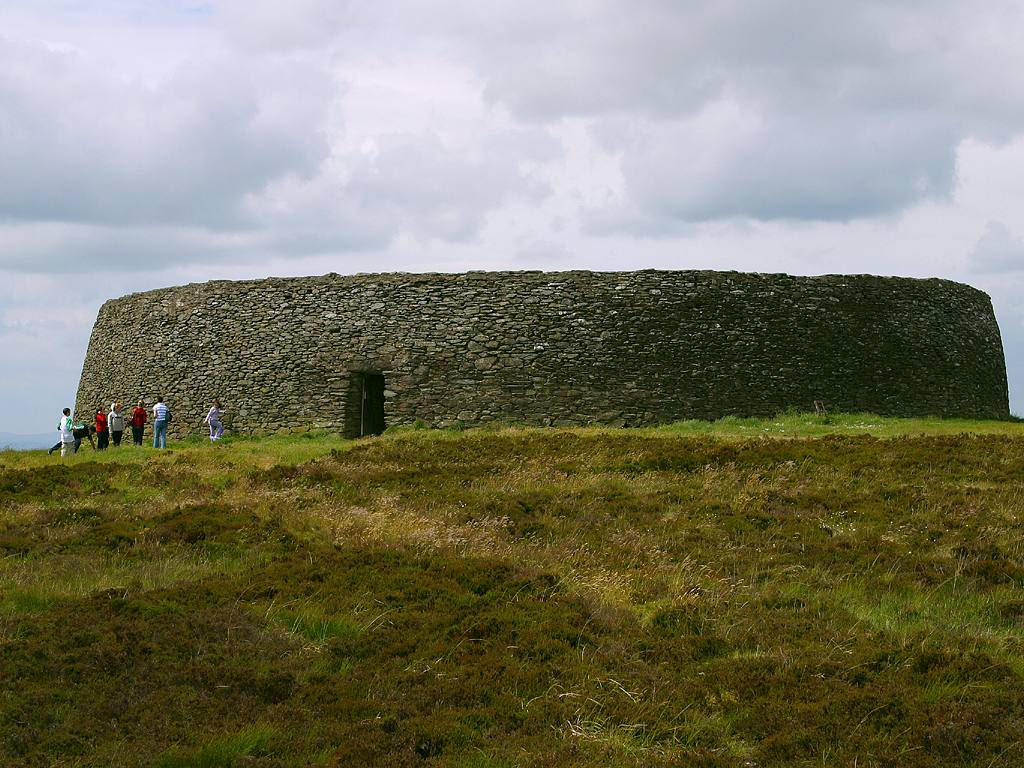
An example of a Gaelic Irish stone ringfort. Grianan of Aileach (see inside)

Many of the towns in Gaelic Ireland had some type of defense in the form of walls or ditches. For most of the Gaelic period, dwellings and buildings were circular with conical thatched roofs. Many towns and dwellings in Gaelic Ireland were often surrounded by a circular rampart called a "ringfort". There were very few nucleated settlements, but after the 5th century, some monasteries became the heart of small "monastic towns", many of the Irish round towers were built after this period.

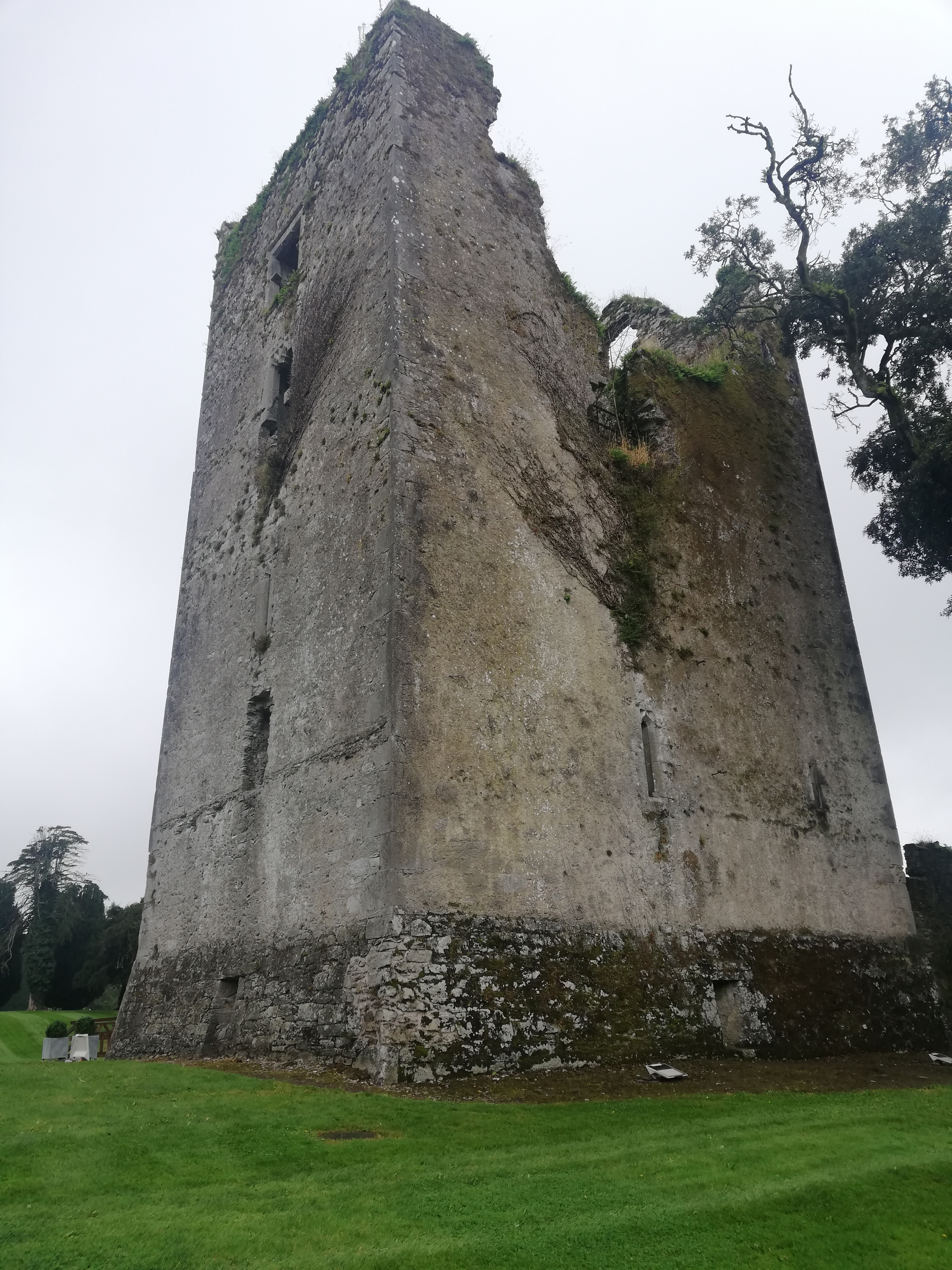
A tower house in Ireland. The Normans consolidated their presence throughout Ireland by building hundreds of castles and towers such as this.

Following the Norman invasion of Ireland, the Normans built motte-and-bailey castles in the areas they occupied, some of which were converted from ringforts. Within Gaelic Ireland, many of the areas conquered by Anglo-Normans often had defense walls due to the frontier type of lifestyle. Some had these walls built, assuming that the town had no adequate defense, using only a ditch. The masonry walls in some towns had not been completed due to the economics of the time. While many of the towns often constructed what look to be defensive walls, this can sometimes not be the case. Towns constructed walls and town gates at times as merely a symbol of lordly wealth, or as a physical expression of power; the defensive aspects of some of these walls and gates would become a secondary role.

By the 12th century, "some mottes, especially in frontier areas, had almost certainly been built by the Gaelic Irish in imitation" of the Normans. The Hiberno-Normans gradually replaced these wooden motte-and-baileys with stone castles and tower houses. Square and rectangle-shaped buildings gradually became more common, and by the 14th or 15th century, they had replaced round buildings completely.

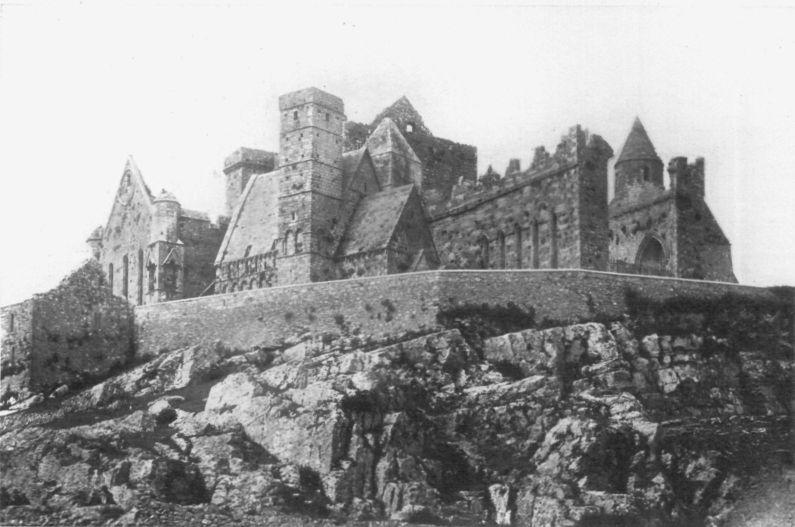
The Rock of Cashel, the citadel in which the defenders attempted to hold off the assault during the Sack of Cashel.

Starting in the late 16th century, an era of Siege warfare began in Ireland. During this period, urban defense came to the forefront of Gaelic warfare and became increasingly important. Following shocking atrocities at the Sack of Cashel and Oliver Cromwell’s siege and massacre at Drogheda. Gaelic Irish rebels, realizing that they could not expect or trust any quarter to be given upon surrender, began to improvise and set traps for armies besieging their towns.

At both the siege of Clonmel and siege of Charlemont, Irish rebel defenders were able to exact a heavy toll on English forces. During Clonmel, Cromwell's New Model Army and 8,000 men eventually took the town from its 2,000 Irish defenders, but not before suffering heavy losses of around 2,000 soldiers or a quarter of their total force, their largest ever loss in a single action. At Charlemont, a small force of less than 200 defenders and townsfolk was able to hold off the New Model Army for two months through heavy fighting after arming the entire town's populace, including women. In both engagements, the English, with overwhelming forces, surrounded the fortifications and created a breach in the defenses using cannon fire and then assaulted the breach. Both times, the town’s people and defenders set a trap within. At Clonmel, they built a coupure within the breach and lined it with artillery, muskets, and pikemen, thus creating a killing field just inside the walls. In both instances, Irish defenders were able to compel the superior English forces into granting surrender agreements with generous terms through heavy fighting and attrition to the besieging armies.

=== Tactics and organisation ===
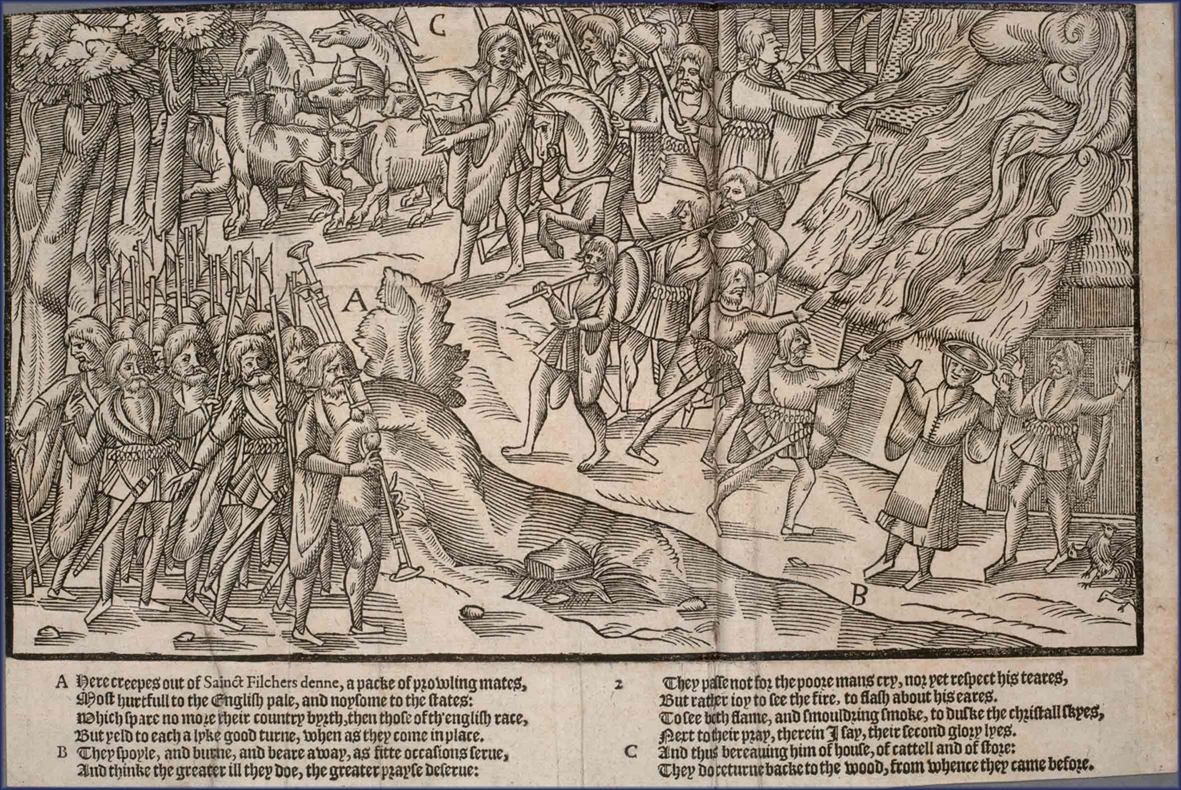
A raid depicted in The Image of Irelande (1581). Ceithearn or Kern made up the bulk of Gaelic armies, as levied light infantrymen. Note the Bagpiper leading the troops.

Initially Kern or ceithern were members of individual tribes, but later, when the Vikings and English came to Ireland, they introduced new systems of billeting soldiers, the kern became billeted soldiers and mercenaries who served the highest bidder. Because kern were equipped and trained as light skirmishers, they faced a severe disadvantage in pitched battle. In battle, the kern and lightly armed horsemen would charge the enemy line after intimidating them with shock tactics, war cries, horns and pipes.

If the kern failed to break an enemy line after the charge, they were liable to flee. If the enemy formation did not break under the kern's charge, then heavily armed and armoured Irish soldiers were moved forward and would advance from the rear lines and attack, these units were replaced in the late 13th century by the Gallowglass or Gallóglaigh, who at first were Norse-Gaelic mercenaries but by the 15th century most large túatha in Ireland had fostered and developed their own hereditary forces of Gallowglass. The primary function of Gaelic Heavy infantry was so lighter combatants such as Kern and Hobelars caught in thick fighting could strike, break free, re-group and tactically retreat behind the newly formed battle line if they needed to.

By the time of the Tudor reconquest of Ireland, the forces under Hugh O'Neill, Earl of Tyrone had adopted Continental pike-and-shot tactics. Indeed, from the 16th century on, the Gaelic Irish fought with the most up-to-date methods of warfare, including full reliance on firearms and modern tactics. Their formations consisted of a mix of Pikemen, musketeers and Gaelic swordsmen who began to be equipped and fight more like the continental units like the German Landsknecht or the Spanish Rodelero. They used these tactics to fight the invading English forces, however, these formations proved vulnerable without adequate cavalry support. Muskets and other Firearms were widely used in combination with traditional Gaelic shock and hit and run tactics, often in ambushes against enemy columns on the march.

=== Adaptations ===
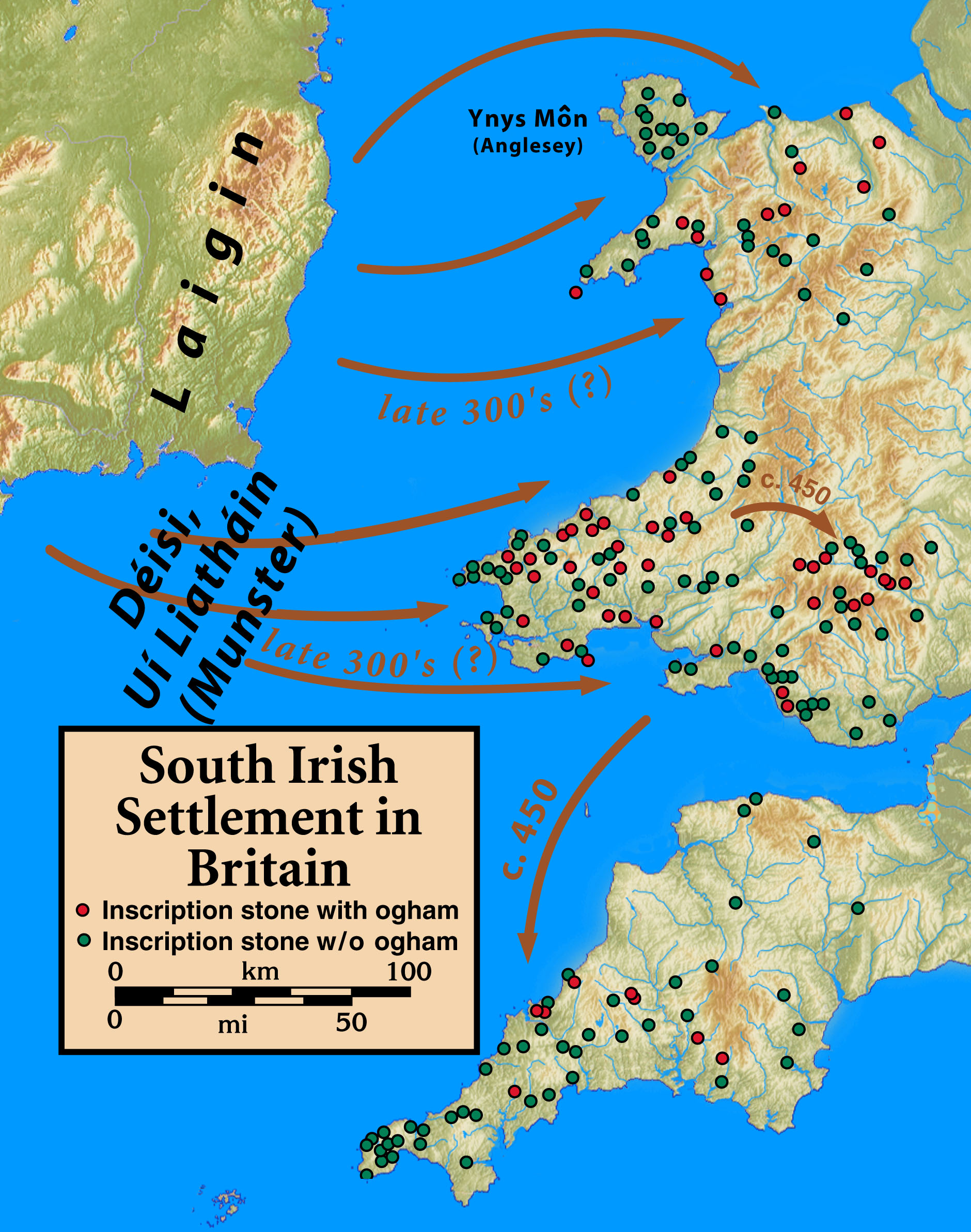
A map of the early Irish raids and colonies of Britain during and following Roman rule in Britain.

As time went on, the Gaels began intensifying their raids and colonies in Roman Britain (c. 200–500 AD). Naval forces were necessary for this, and, as a result, large numbers of small boats, called currachs, were employed. Gaelic forces were so frequently at sea (especially the Dál Riata Gaels), weaponry had to change. Javelins and slings became more uncommon, as they required too much space to launch, which the small currachs did not allow. Instead, more and more Gaels were armed with bows and arrows.

The Dál Riata, for example, after colonizing the west of Scotland and becoming a maritime power, became an army composed completely of archers. Slings also went out of use, replaced by both bows and a very effective naval weapon called the crann tabhaill, a kind of catapult.

Later, when the Gaels came into contact with the Vikings, they realized the need for heavier weaponry, so as to make hacking through the much larger Norse shields and heavy mail-coats possible.

Heavier hacking-swords and polearm weapons became more frequent, as did Iron helmets and mail-coats. Gaels began to regularly use the double-handed "Dane Axe", wielded by the Vikings. Irish and Scottish infantry troops fighting with the Claymore, axes and heavier armour, in addition to their own native darts and bows. These heavy troops became known as the Gallòglaigh (Gallowglass), or "foreign soldiers", and formed an important part of Gaelic armies in the future.

The coming of the Normans into Ireland and Britain several hundred years later also forced the Irish and Scots to use an increasingly large number of more heavily armoured warriors combined quick skirmisher cavalry in order to effectively deal with the mail-clad Normans.

During the Scottish Wars of Independence, the Scots had to develop a means to counter the Anglo-Norman English and their devastating combined use of heavy cavalry and the Longbow. Which had dominated almost every battlefield in Great Britain since Hastings.

The Scottish rebels Andrew de Moray, William Wallace and Scottish King Robert the Bruce can all be credited with the development of the Schiltron as a counter to the Normans and their early use of combined arms warfare. English Chroniclers of the era said of the warriors in the Schiltrons:

- "They were all on foot; picked men they were, enthusiastic, armed with keen axes, and other weapons, and with their shields closely locked in front of them, they formed an impenetrable phalanx ..."
- "They had axes at their sides and lances in their hands. They advanced like a thick-set hedge and such a phalanx could not easily be broken."

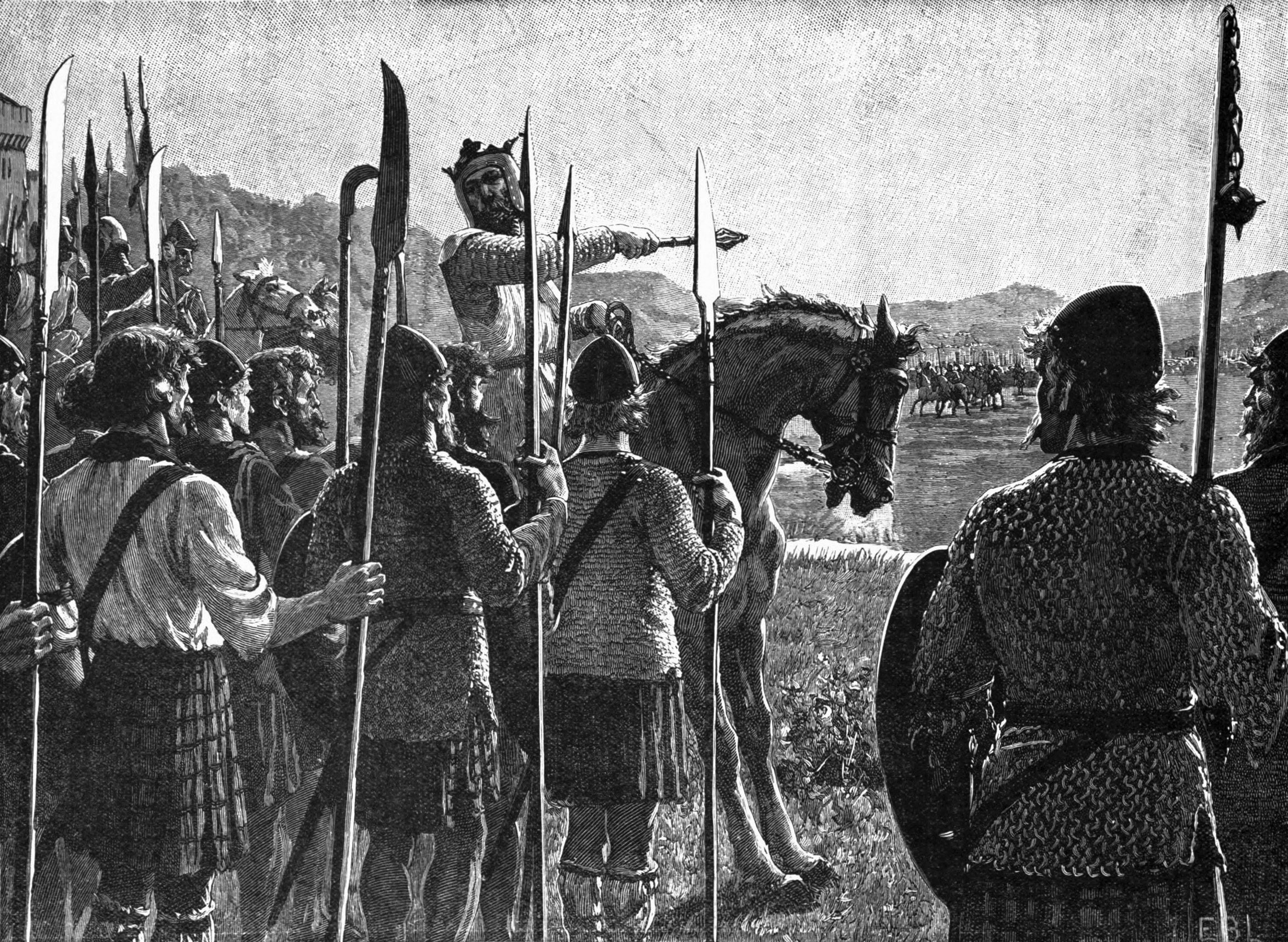
A depiction of Robert the Bruce directing his men on the field at the Battle of Bannockburn from Cassell's Illustrated History of England.

Andrew de Moray is credited with using the Schiltron early on in the campaign, but he died shortly after sustaining a mortal injury at the Battle of Stirling Bridge.

In early engagements, like when Schiltrons were used by William Wallace at the Battle of Falkirk, the immobile Phalanx-like formations proved vulnerable to the English Longbowmen without adequate cavalry support. But the Scots learned from this and by the time Edward II met the Scots at Bannockburn, Robert the Bruce had adapted the Schiltron and turned it into a more mobile offensive formation (much like the later Pike Square of continental fame). With these tight mobile formations and adequate cavalry support. The Scots were able to use this innovative adaptation to pin the English heavy horse against the Bannockburn on the second day of the Battle of Bannockburn and routed the army of Edward II of England paving the way for eventual Scottish Independence.

=== Standards and music ===
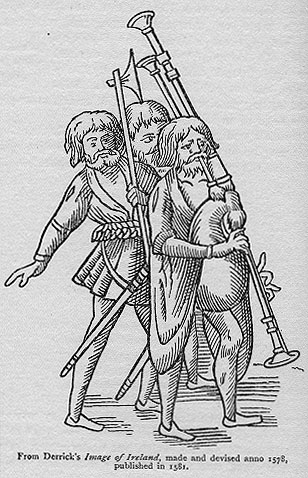
A Bagpiper as depicted in The Image of Irelande (1581).

Many Gaelic clans each had their own distinct cultures, symbols, heraldry, flags and battle standards. Wind instruments such as hollowed-out bull horns were often carried into battle by Chieftains or War leaders and used as a means to rally men into combat. Bagpipes eventually gained popularity among Gaelic clans and replaced other rallying instruments such as the blowing horn or carnyx, and it can be attributed to being used from as early as the 14th century. Most notably, the Great Irish Warpipes, which went on to be used by Gaelic mercenaries in European conflicts and eventually developed into ceremonial instruments. Bagpipes have since become an important symbol of Gaelic culture as a whole. With both the Uilleann pipes and the Great Highland Bagpipe playing important roles in the culture of their respective nations.

== Exported Gaelic warfare ==
=== Gallowglass ===
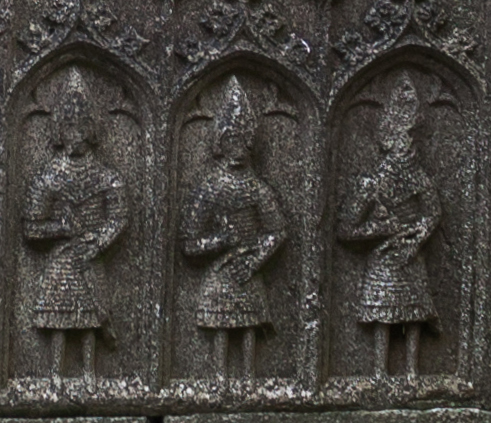
Fifteenth-century sculpted figures of Gallowglasses, as depicted upon the apparent effigy of Feidhlimidh Ó Conchobhair, King of Connacht and father of Áed na nGall, victor of the Battle of Connacht.

The most prolific Norse legacy in Gaelic warfare was the introduction of the Gallowglass, gallóglaigh (Irish) or gallòglaich (Scottish Gaelic), a kind of heavy infantry, shock troop and elite bodyguard for the Gaelic Nobility. Similar in function to the Housecarls of the English nobility or the Varangian Guard of Constantinople. The original Gallowglass were Norse–Gaelic mercenaries who came from the Hebrides and the Isles. They appeared in Ireland in the 13th century, following the Wars of Scottish Independence and the Bruce campaign but by the 15th century most large túatha had their own hereditary force of Gallowglass. They fought and trained in a combination of Gaelic and Norse techniques, and were highly valued; they were hired throughout the British Isles at different times, though most famously in Ireland.

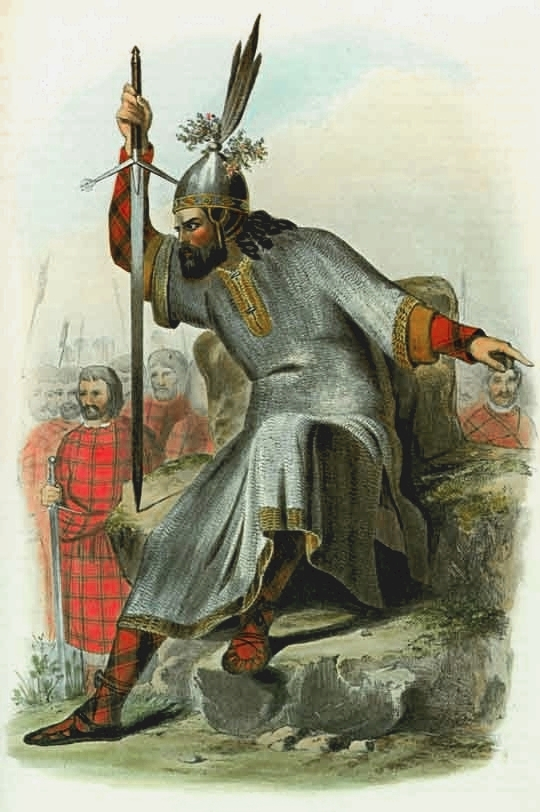
A Norse-Gaelic Chieftain from Clan MacDonald wearing Mail and wielding a Claymore as depicted by R.R. McIan

One of the first battles believed to have to included Gallowglass was the Battle of Connacht. As Áed na nGall Ó Conchobair, the King of Connacht who defeated the Anglo-Normans, was known to travel with a retinue of 160 Gallowglass that he received as a dowry. Gallowglass usually wore mail and iron helmets and wielded heavy weaponry such as the Dane axe, Sparth axes, Lochaber axes, Longswords, Claymores and sometimes spears or lances. These Gallóglaigh furnished the retreating Gaels with a "moving line of defense from which the horsemen could make short, sharp charges, and behind which they could retreat when pursued". Their heavy armour made them less nimble than kern, so they were sometimes placed at strategic spots along the line of retreat.

Gallowglasses were frequently hired and served as mercenaries in continental armies and units, such as the Dutch Blue Guards, Swiss Guard, the French Scottish Guard, and the forces of King Gustavus Adolphus of Sweden in his invasion of Livonia during the Thirty Years' War. Gallowglass later became a caste of warrior rather than an indicator of a Norse Gaelic origin, with Irish Gallowglass clans producing their own.

Despite the increased usage of firearms in Irish warfare following the 16th century, Gallowglass remained an integral part of Hugh Ó Neill's forces during the Nine Years' War. Following the combined Irish defeat at the Battle of Kinsale in 1601, the recruitment of the heavily armoured warriors finally waned.

=== Hobelars ===
Hobelars were a mounted, highly mobile skirmisher unit. Some were mounted archers, some were merely light cavalry. These Gaelic horsemen were utilitarian and could fill multiple roles on the battlefield, including as mobile skirmishing infantry used to outmaneuver enemy units or as skirmishing cavalry, used for quick and abrupt attacks.

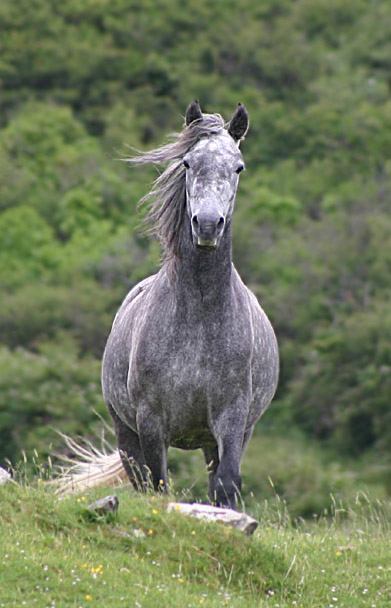
A Connemara pony, modern descendant of the Irish Hobby Horse, which was used for skirmishing and light cavalry.

Early Hobelars wore little armour, they typically rode on smaller, quicker, unarmoured hobby horses and ponies rather than the full-sized horses that Men-at-arms rode. Hobelars would typically dismount to fight, harry their opponents and then utilize their mounts as a quick getaway. As time went on, Hobelars began to be utilized for more and more cavalry tasks and functions.

During his conflicts with the English crown, Robert the Bruce deployed the hobby for his campaign of guerilla warfare and mounted raids to great success, covering 60 to 70 miles (100 to 110 km) a day. They were so successful that Edward I of England prevented Irish exports of hobbies to Scotland in order to gain an advantage in the conflict. Hobelars were highly proficient at scouting, patrolling and ambushing in areas typically unreachable by cavalry units such a mountainous areas, thick forests and boggy swamps. Within Ireland and Great Britain and beyond, the skirmisher cavalry were a well-known and highly valued as a light and mobile unit.

After the successful and effective deployment of these horsemen by both the English and Scottish during the Scottish Wars of Independence. Belligerents in continental conflicts also began to hire Irish and Scottish Gaels as mercenary troops for their armies. Both the English and French hired these Gaelic horsemen and both eventually duplicated the concept themselves. Hobelars were principally utilized in engagements during the Scottish Wars of Independence and Hundred Years' War. After time, the Hobelars slowly adapted from mounted skirmishers much like kern, into a more basic form of light cavalry. On the continent, from 1311 on, continental Hobelars became more and more armoured and less distinguishable from other cavalry units.

Auld Wat of Harden, both a famous and notorious Scottish Border reiver.

In Scotland, Hobelars served as the offensive arm of castle garrisons. Hobelars were utilized as raiders across the border by both the English and Scots, they can be viewed as early predecessors to the reivers and moss-troopers of the Scottish borderlands.

=== Later Weaponry ===
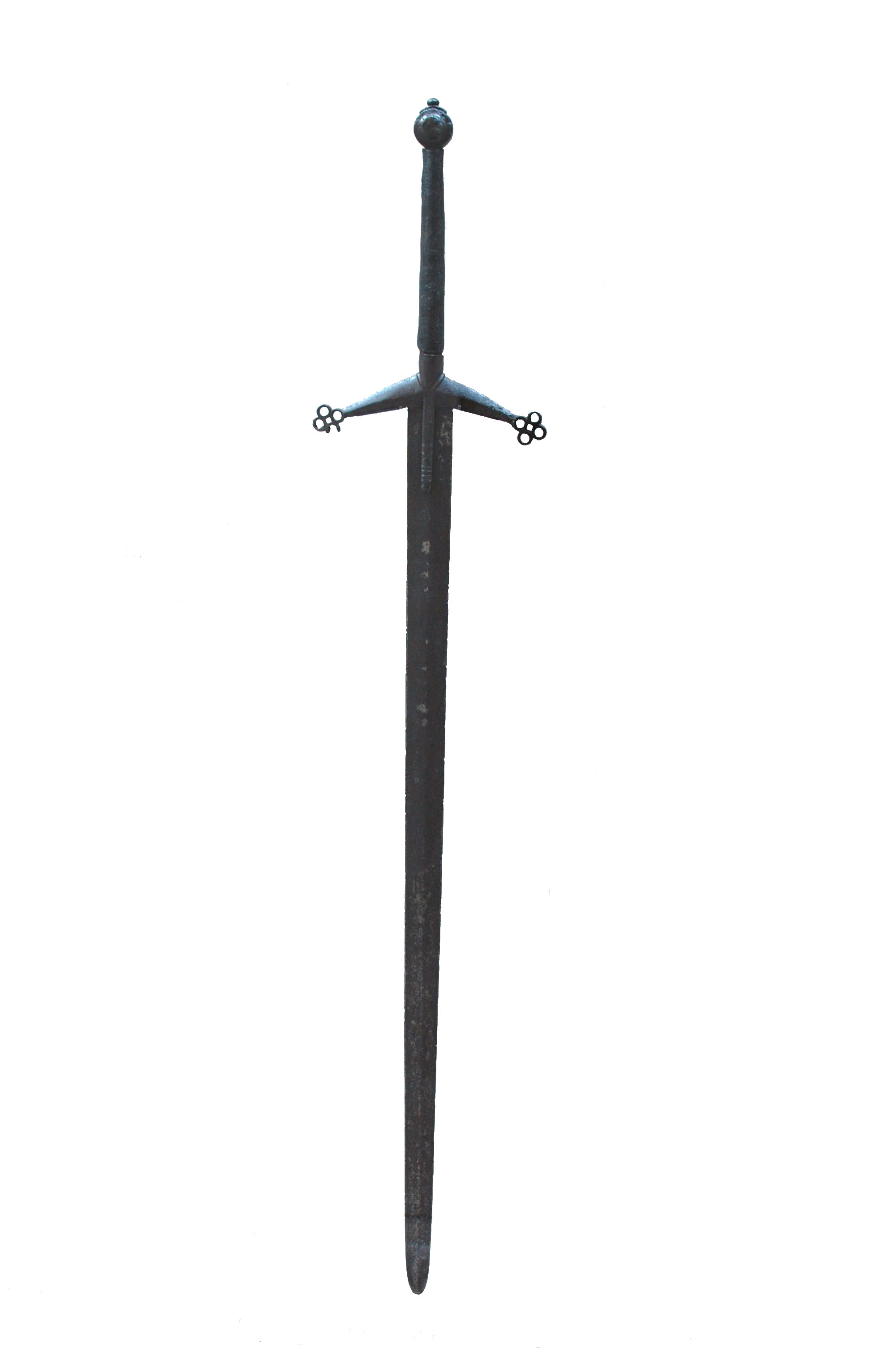
The Great Sword (Claideamh Mòr) or claymore was a two-handed sword favored by both Scottish Highlanders and the Gallowglass in Ireland.

During the Late Middle Ages and Renaissance period, weapon imports from Europe influenced Gaelic weapon design. Take, for example, the German Zweihänder sword, a long double-handed weapon used for quick, powerful cuts and thrusts. Irish swords were copied from these models, which had unique furnishings. Many, for example, often featured open rings on the pommel. On any locally designed Irish sword in the Middle Ages, this meant you could see the end of the tang go through the pommel and cap the end. These swords were often of very fine construction and quality. Scottish swords continued to use the more traditional "V" cross-guards that had been on pre-Norse Gaelic swords, culminating in such pieces as the now famous "claymore" design. This was an outgrowth of numerous earlier designs and has become a symbol of Scotland. The claymore was used together with the typical axes of the Gallowglass until the 18th century, but began to be replaced by pistols, muskets and basket-hilted swords, which were shorter versions of the claymore which were used with one hand in conjunction with a shield. These basket-hilted broadswords are still a symbol of Scotland to this day, as is the typical small round shield known as a "targe."

=== Redshanks ===
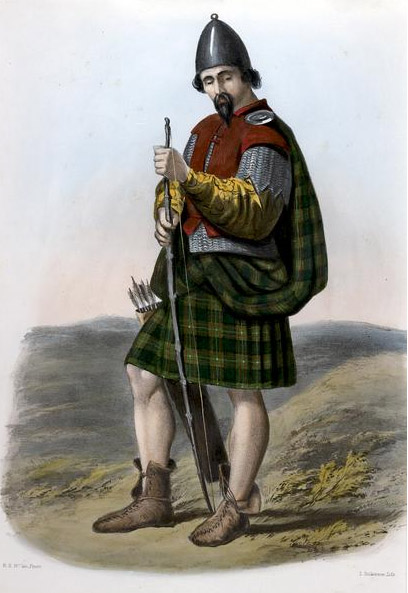
Highlanders, like the one depicted here by R.R. McIan were hired by Gaelic clans and nobility to fight the English crown in the Tudor conquest and Confederate Wars.

Redshank was a nickname for Scottish or Ulster mercenaries from the Highlands and Western Isles contracted to fight in Ireland; they were a prominent feature of Irish armies throughout the 16th century. They were called redshanks because, similarly to the Irish, they went dressed in plaids and waded bare-legged through rivers in the coldest weather. The term was not derogatory, however, as the English were in general impressed with the redshanks' qualities as soldiers.

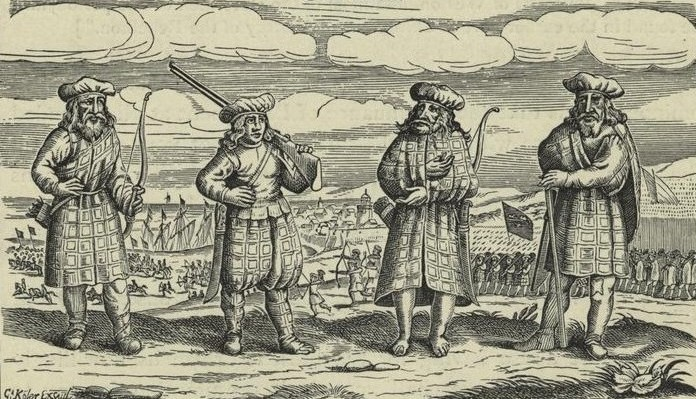
Scottish mercenaries known as Redshanks, were highly sought after. Shown here fighting in the Thirty Years War.

The redshanks were usually armed alike, principally with bows (the short bow of Scotland and Ireland, rather than the longbow of Wales and England) and, initially, two-handed weapons like claymores, battle axes or Lochaber axes. English observers reported that some Highlanders fighting in Ireland wore chain mail, long obsolete elsewhere.

Later in the period, they may have adopted the targe and single-handed broadsword, a style of weaponry originally fashionable in early 16th-century Spain from where its use could have spread to Ireland. Combined with the use of muskets, this could have influenced the development of what was later referred to as the "highland charge", a tactic of firing a single coordinated musket volley before closing at a run with sword and targe. Many Gaelic clan levies, called Caterans, would have remained relatively poorly armed.

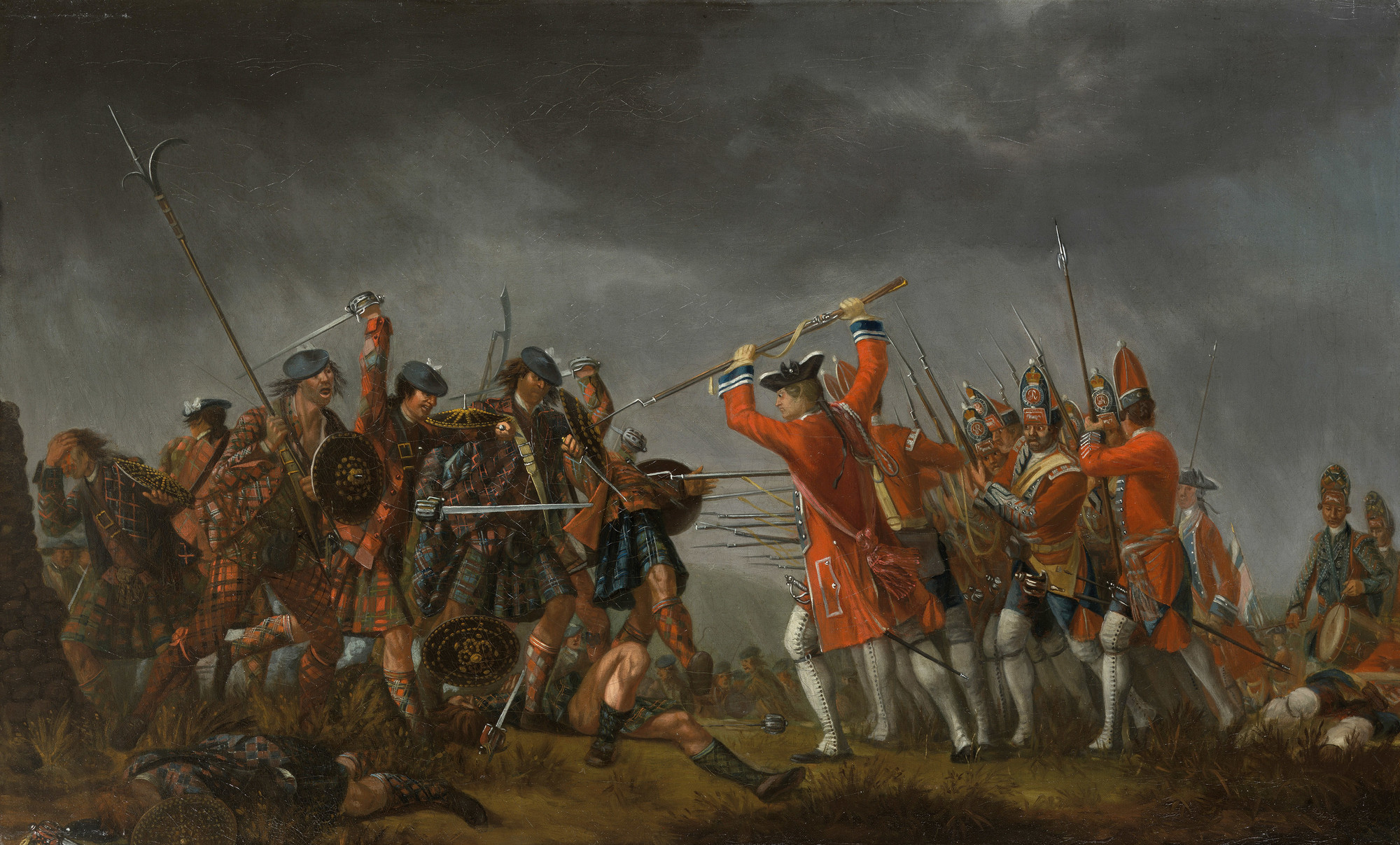
Scottish Highlanders conducting a Highland Charge at the Battle of Culloden in 1746.

By the mid-17th century, a large number of Scottish Highlanders, also often called "redshanks", fought in the Irish Confederate Wars, notably the clansmen serving under Alasdair Mac Colla, himself a member of a minor Hebridean branch of Clan Donald (a cadet family of Clan MacDonald of Dunnyveg). However, the Highlanders who fought at the Battle of Dungan's Hill and Battle of Knocknanuss were to be the last of the redshanks.

The subsequent Cromwellian conquest and Williamite War brought an end to Irish employment of Scottish Highland mercenaries through the destruction of their employers, the Gaelic nobility and by the pacification of the Scottish Gaels with the Statutes of Iona and the Highland clearances.

== List of Gaelic conflicts and battles ==
This is a list of battles or conflicts in which the Gaels had a leading or crucial role.

- 106 CE: Magh Line
- 157 CE: Battle of Tuath Amrois
- 195 CE: Battle of Maigh Mucruimhe
- 225 CE: Battle of Crinna
- 283 CE: Cath Gabhra
- 331 CE: Achaidh Leithdeircc
- 493 CE: Battle for the Body of St. Patrick
- 596 CE: Battle of Raith
- 561 CE: Battle of Cúl Dreimhne
- 603 CE: Battle of Degsastan
- 629 CE: Battle of Fid Eoin
- 637 CE: Battle of Moira
- 735 CE: Óengus campaigns against Dál Riata
- 736 CE: Battle of Cnoc Coirpi
- 741 CE: Battle of Druimm Cathmail
- 841 CE: MacAlpin's treason
- 795 CE: Early Viking raids in Ireland
- 868 CE: Battle of Cell Ua nDaigri
- 877 CE: Battle of Strangford Lough
- 908 CE: Battle of Ballaghmoon
- 915 CE: Battle of Confey
- 917 CE: Battle of Mag Femen
- 919 CE: Battle of Islandbridge
- 968 CE: Battle of Sulcoit
- 968 CE: Burning of Luimnech
- 977 CE: Battle of Cathair Cuan
- 978 CE: Battle of Belach Lechta
- 980 CE: Battle of Tara
- 999 CE: Battle of Glenmama
- 1014 CE: Battle of Clontarf
- 1130 CE: Battle of Stracathro
- 1132 CE: O'Brian's siege of Galway
- 1149 CE: O'Brian's second siege of Galway
- 1151 CE: Battle of Móin Mhór
- 1164 CE: Battle of Renfrew
- 1169 CE: Siege of Wexford
- 1171 CE: Siege of Dublin
- 1174 CE: Battle of Thurles
- 1185 CE: Prince John's Expedition
- 1230 CE: De Burgh's siege of Galway
- 1234 CE: Battle of the Curragh
- 1245 CE: Battle of Embo
- 1247 CE: Battle of Ballyshannon
- 1247 CE: Sack of Dun Gallimhe
- 1249 CE: First Battle of Athenry
- 1256 CE: Battle of Magh Slecht
- 1257 CE: Battle of Creadran Cille
- 1260 CE: Battle of Down
- 1261 CE: Battle of Callann
- 1262 CE: Battle of Tooreencormick
- 1263 CE: Battle of Largs
- 1270 CE: Battle of Connacht
- 1275 CE: Manx revolt
- 1275 CE: Battle of Ronaldsway
- 1294 CE: Battle of Red Ford
- 1296 CE: Sack of Berwick
- 1297 CE: Lanark
- 1297 CE: Raid on Scone
- 1297 CE: Battle of Stirling Bridge
- 1298 CE: Battle of Falkirk
- 1303 CE: Battle of Roslin
- 1304 CE: Battle of Happrew
- 1304 CE: Siege at Stirling Castle
- 1304 CE: Earnside
- 1306 CE: Battle of Dalrigh
- 1307 CE: Battle of Loch Ryan
- 1307 CE: Battle of Turnberry
- 1307 CE: Battle of Glen Trool
- 1307 CE: Battle of Loudoun Hill
- 1307 CE: Battle of Slioch
- 1308 CE: Battle of Barra
- 1308 CE: Harrying of Buchan
- 1308 CE: Battle of the River Dee
- 1308 CE: Battle of the Pass of Brander
- 1314 CE: Capture of Roxburgh
- 1314 CE: Battle of Bannockburn
- 1315 CE: Battle of Moiry Pass
- 1315 CE: Battle of Connor
- 1315 CE: Battle of Kells
- 1316 CE: Battle of Skerries
- 1316 CE: Second Battle of Athenry
- 1317 CE: Battle of Lough Raska
- 1318 CE: Battle of Dysert O'Dea
- 1318 CE: Battle of Faughart
- 1327 CE: Battle of Fiodh-an-Átha
- 1328 CE: Battle of Thomond
- 1329 CE: Braganstown massacre
- 1329 CE: Battle of Ardnocher
- 1337 CE: Battle of Drumlui
- 1370 CE: Battle of Invernahavon
- 1385 CE: Battle of Tochar Cruachain-Bri-Ele
- 1391 CE: Raid of Angus
- 1394 CE: Battle of Ros-Mhic-Thriúin
- 1396 CE: Battle of the North Inch
- 1399 CE: Battle of Tragh-Bhaile
- 1402 CE: Battle of Drumoak
- 1406 CE: Battle of Cluain Immorrais
- 1406 CE: Battle of Tuiteam Tarbhach
- 1411 CE: Battle of Dingwall
- 1411 CE: Battle of Harlaw
- 1426 CE: Battle of Harpsdale
- 1429 CE: Battle of Lochaber
- 1429 CE: Battle of Mamsha
- 1429 CE: Battle of Palm Sunday
- 1429 CE: Siege of Inverness
- 1430 CE: Battle of Drumnacoub
- 1431 CE: Battle of Inverlochy
- 1437 CE: Sandside Chase
- 1438 CE: Battle of Tannach
- 1439 CE: Battle of Craignaught Hill
- 1441 CE: Battle of Craig Cailloch
- 1445 CE: Battle of Arbroath
- 1452 CE: Battle of Bealach nam Broig
- 1452 CE: Battle of Brechin
- 1454 CE: Battle of Clachnaharry
- 1455 CE: Battle of Arkinholm
- 1470 CE: Battle of Corpach
- 1478 CE: Battle of Champions
- 1480 CE: Battle of Bloody Bay
- 1480 CE: Battle of Lagabraad
- 1480 CE: Battle of Skibo and Strathfleet
- 1485 CE: Battle of Blar Na Pairce
- 1486 CE: Battle of Tarbat
- 1487 CE: Battle of Aldy Charrish
- 1490 CE: Massacre of Monzievaird
- 1491 CE: Battle of Blar Na Pairce
- 1491 CE: Raid on Ross
- 1497 CE: Battle of Drumchatt
- 1499 CE: Battle of Daltullich
- 1501 CE: Dubh's Rebellion
- 1504 CE: Battle of Knockdoe
- 1504 CE: Cairnburgh Castle
- 1505 CE: Achnashellach
- 1513 CE: Battle of Glendale
- 1522 CE: Battle of Knockavoe
- 1534 CE: Kildare rebellion
- 1539 CE: Battle of Belahoe
- 1544 CE: Battle of the Shirts
- 1544 CE: Raids of Urquhart
- 1559 CE: Battle of Spancel Hill
- 1569 CE: First Desmond Rebellion
- 1565 CE: Battle of Glentaisie
- 1567 CE: Battle of Farsetmore
- 1570 CE: Battle of Bun Garbhain
- 1570 CE: Battle of Torran-Roy
- 1572 CE: Sack of Athenry
- 1574 CE: Clandeboye massacre
- 1575 CE: Rathlin Island massacre
- 1577 CE: Sack of Eigg
- 1577 CE: Massacre of Mullaghmast
- 1578 CE: Battle of the Spoiling Dyke
- 1579 CE: Second Desmond Rebellion
- 1580 CE: Battle of Glenmalure
- 1580 CE: Siege of Carrigafoyle Castle
- 1580 CE: Siege of Smerwick
- 1585 CE: Battle of the Western Isles
- 1590 CE: Battle of Doire Leathan
- 1590 CE: Battle of Clynetradwell
- 1593 CE: Battle of Belleek
- 1594 CE: Siege of Enniskillen
- 1594 CE: Battle of the Ford of the Biscuits
- 1594 CE: Battle of Glenlivet
- 1595 CE: Assault on the Blackwater Fort
- 1595 CE: Battle of Clontibret
- 1596 CE: O'Donnell's siege of Galway
- 1597 CE: Dublin gunpowder explosion
- 1597 CE: Battle of Carrickfergus
- 1598 CE: Battle of Traigh Ghruinneart
- 1598 CE: Battle of Benbigrie
- 1598 CE: Battle of the Yellow Ford
- 1599 CE: Battle of Deputy's Pass
- 1599 CE: Siege of Cahir Castle
- 1600 CE: Battle of Curlew Pass
- 1600 CE: Battle of Moyry Pass
- 1600 CE: Battle of Lifford
- 1601 CE: Battle of Carinish
- 1601 CE: Battle of Coire Na Creiche
- 1601 CE: Siege of Donegal
- 1601 CE: Siege of Kinsale
- 1601 CE: Battle of Castlehaven
- 1602 CE: Siege of Dunboy
- 1602 CE: Dursey massacre
- 1602 CE: Burning of Dungannon
- 1641 CE: Irish Rebellion of 1641
- 1641 CE: Portadown massacre
- 1641 CE: Siege of Drogheda
- 1641 CE: Battle of Julianstown
- 1642 CE: Battle of Kilrush
- 1642 CE: Rathlin Island massacre
- 1645 CE: Battle of the Braes of Strathdearn
- 1645 CE: Battle of Inverlochy
- 1646 CE: Battle of Benburb
- 1646 CE: Battle of Lagganmore
- 1646 CE: Dunoon massacre
- 1646 CE: Battle of Rhunahaorine Moss
- 1647 CE: Sack of Cashel
- 1647 CE: Battle of Dunaverty
- 1649 CE: Drogheda massacre
- 1650 CE: Siege of Clonmel
- 1650 CE: Siege of Charlemont
- 1655 CE: Stand-off at the Fords of Arkaig
- 1680 CE: Battle of Altimarlach
- 1688 CE: Battle of Mulroy
- 1692 CE: Massacre of Glencoe
- 1715 CE: Siege of Brahan
- 1715 CE: Battle of Sheriffmuir
- 1719 CE: Capture of Eilean Donan Castle
- 1719 CE: Battle of Glen Shiel
- 1721 CE: Battle of Glen Affric
- 1721 CE: Battle of Coille Bhan
- 1745 CE: Highbridge Skirmish
- 1745 CE: First siege of Ruthven Barracks
- 1745 CE: Battle of Prestonpans
- 1745 CE: Siege of Culloden House
- 1745 CE: First siege of Carlisle
- 1745 CE: Clifton Moor Skirmish
- 1745 CE: Second siege of Carlisle
- 1745 CE: First siege of Fort Augustus
- 1745 CE: Battle of Inverurie
- 1746 CE: Battle of Falkirk Muir
- 1746 CE: Siege of Stirling Castle
- 1746 CE: Second siege of Ruthven Barracks
- 1746 CE: Siege of Inverness
- 1746 CE: Second siege of Fort Augustus
- 1746 CE: Atholl raids
- 1746 CE: Siege of Blair Castle
- 1746 CE: Skirmish of Keith
- 1746 CE: Siege of Fort William
- 1746 CE: Battle of Dornoch
- 1746 CE: Skirmish of Tongue
- 1746 CE: Battle of Littleferry
- 1746 CE: Battle of Culloden

== See also ==
- Gaels
- Gaelic Ireland
- Celtic warfare
- Ceathairne (Cateran)
- Gallóglaigh (Gallowglass)
- Hobelar
- Fianna
- Redshank
- Military History
- Warfare in Medieval Scotland
