= 1247 in Ireland =

- Centuries: 11th; 12th; 13th; 14th; 15th
- Decades: 1220s; 1230s; 1240s; 1250s; 1260s
- See also: Other events of 1247; List of years in Ireland

Events from the year 1247 in Ireland.

== Incumbent ==
- Lord: Henry III

== Events ==
- The earliest known records of a settlement at Carrick-on-Suir are dated to 1247, when a charter of three fairs per year was awarded to Matthew Fitzgriffin, Anglo-Norman Lord of the Manor of Carrick.
- Battle between Anglo-Normans and Irish led to the Sack of Dun Gallimhe by Irish forces.
