= 1245 in Ireland =

- Centuries: 11th; 12th; 13th; 14th; 15th
- Decades: 1220s; 1230s; 1240s; 1250s; 1260s
- See also: Other events of 1245; List of years in Ireland

Events from the year 1245 in Ireland.

== Leadership ==
- Lord: Henry III

== Events ==
- An earthquake destroys the Cathedral of Down which was established by John de Courcy with generous endowments to the Benedictines from Chester in England in 1183.
- William Welwood becomes Lord Chancellor of Ireland.
- Maurice Fitzgerald, the Lord Chief Justice of Ireland, is generally credited with the establishment of the medieval European-style town and port of Sligo, building Sligo Castle in 1245.
