= 1243 in Ireland =

- Centuries: 11th; 12th; 13th; 14th; 15th
- Decades: 1220s; 1230s; 1240s; 1250s; 1260s
- See also: Other events of 1243; List of years in Ireland

Events from the year 1243 in Ireland.

== Incumbent ==
- Lord: Henry III

== Events ==
- Walter de Burgh, 1st Earl of Ulster succeeded his father as Lord of Connaught

== Deaths ==
- Maol Eoin Ó Crechain, Archdeacon of Tuam and Doctor of Sacred Theology
