= 1242 in Ireland =

- Centuries: 11th; 12th; 13th; 14th; 15th
- Decades: 1220s; 1230s; 1240s; 1250s; 1260s
- See also: Other events of 1242; List of years in Ireland

Events from the year 1242 in Ireland.

== Incumbent ==
- Lord: Henry III

== Deaths ==
- Richard Mor de Burgh (born c. 1194) was the eldest son of William de Burgh and founder of the towns of Ballinasloe, Loughrea and Galway.
- Hugh de Lacy, 1st Earl of Ulster
