= 1241 in Ireland =

- Centuries: 11th; 12th; 13th; 14th; 15th
- Decades: 1220s; 1230s; 1240s; 1250s; 1260s
- See also: Other events of 1241; List of years in Ireland

Events from the year 1241 in Ireland.

== Incumbent ==
- Lord: Henry III

== Events ==
- Battle of Cameirge in Ulster: the Ó Néills from Armagh, the Ó Dónaills from Donegal, and the Ó Dochartaighs of Connacht defeat the Meic Lochlainn of Tír Eoghain and Inishowen under Domhnall mac Muirchertaigh Mac Lochlainn. From now on the Kings of Tír Eoghain will all be of the Ó Néill dynasty, Brian Ua Néill becoming sole ruler.
- Dominican friary at Athenry founded by the de Bermingham family.
- Justice Henry of Bath is on a mission in Ireland.

== Deaths ==
- Walter de Lacy, Lord of Meath (born c.1172).
- Domhnall (Mór) Ó Domhnaill.
- Domhnall mac Muirchertaigh Mac Lochlainn, King of Tír Eoghain.
