= Pangayaw =

Pangayaw means to "raid" or "to sail to battle" in various Philippine languages. It can refer to:

- Mangayaw, naval raids and piracy conducted by the warrior class in various precolonial Philippine societies
- Penjajap, a type of long and narrow warship used for raiding by various Austronesian ethnic groups in the southern Philippines, Brunei, Sabah, and the Maluku Islands

== See also ==
- Viking raid warfare and tactics
