= 1248 in Ireland =

- Centuries: 11th; 12th; 13th; 14th; 15th
- Decades: 1220s; 1230s; 1240s; 1250s; 1260s
- See also: Other events of 1248; List of years in Ireland

Events from the year 1248 in Ireland.

== Incumbent ==
- Lord: Henry III

== Events ==
- King's Bench in Dublin is instituted (today contained within the Four Courts).
- Coleraine Castle is built.
- Goffraidh is inaugurated as "The O'Donnell", i.e. chief of the O'Donnell clan.
- Carrickfergus Abbey is founded by the Franciscan order.
- Jordan de Exeter, Sheriff of Connacht, deals with rebellion in the Clew Bay area (according to the Annals of Connacht).

== Deaths ==
- Walter de Burgo buried at Athassel Priory.
- Rory O'Cannon, the last chieftain of the O'Cannon clan is killed.
