= 1251 in Ireland =

- Centuries: 11th; 12th; 13th; 14th; 15th
- Decades: 1230s; 1240s; 1250s; 1260s; 1270s
- See also: Other events of 1251; List of years in Ireland

Events from the year 1251 in Ireland.

== Incumbent ==
- Lord: Henry III

== Events ==
- Saint Canice's Cathedral built in Kilkenny.
- Fínghin Mac Carthaigh becomes King of Desmond
