= 1250 in Ireland =

- Centuries: 11th; 12th; 13th; 14th; 15th
- Decades: 1230s; 1240s; 1250s; 1260s; 1270s
- See also: Other events of 1250; List of years in Ireland

Events from the year 1250 in Ireland.

== Incumbent ==
- Lord: Henry III

== Events ==
- Leap Castle in County Offaly, was built in by the O'Bannon family and was originally called "Leim ui Bhanain," or "Leap of the O'Bannons."
