= 1252 in Ireland =

- Centuries: 11th; 12th; 13th; 14th; 15th
- Decades: 1230s; 1240s; 1250s; 1260s; 1270s
- See also: Other events of 1252; List of years in Ireland

Events from the year 1252 in Ireland.

== Incumbent ==
- Lord: Henry III

== Events ==
- 8 August – by charter of Henry III of England, Maud de Lacy, Baroness Geneville and her husband Geoffrey de Geneville, 1st Baron Geneville, are granted rights in the lands in the eastern part of the Lordship of Meath surrounding Trim Castle which previously belonged to her grandfather, Walter de Lacy.
