= Alan of Beccles =

Alan of Beccles (c. 1195 – 1240) was official secretary to Bishops Pandulf and Thomas de Blundeville of Norwich between the years 1217 and 1236. He became archdeacon of Sudbury in 1225. After this he was at Paris, as he is mentioned as one of the English of note who left the University of Paris in 1229 on the dispersion of the students in consequence of the riots between them and the citizens. In 1239 he was appointed one of the arbitrators between Bishop Grosseteste and his chapter on the question of visitation. In 1240 he is mentioned as giving way to the demands of the legate Otho for money, in spite of his previous firmness, as Otho succeeded by dividing his opponents. He died suddenly in 1240, and Matthew Paris, while acknowledging his eminence in literature, regards his death as a judgment for the injuries his conduct had caused to St. Albans.
