= Sylvester of Assisi =

Servant of God Sylvester of Assisi OFM

Religious
- Born: c.1175 Assisi, Duchy of Spoleto, Holy Roman Empire
- Died: 6 March 1240 (aged approximately 65 years); Assisi, Umbria, Papal States
- Venerated in: Roman Catholic Church

The Servant of God Sylvester of Assisi, OFM (c. 1175 – 6 March 1240), was born in Assisi in the second half of the 12th century.

== Biography ==
He was a member of one of the noble families of the city, the son of Rosone di Monaldo, the brother of Favarone di Monaldo, who was the father of St. Clare of Assisi. He became one of the first followers of St. Francis of Assisi.

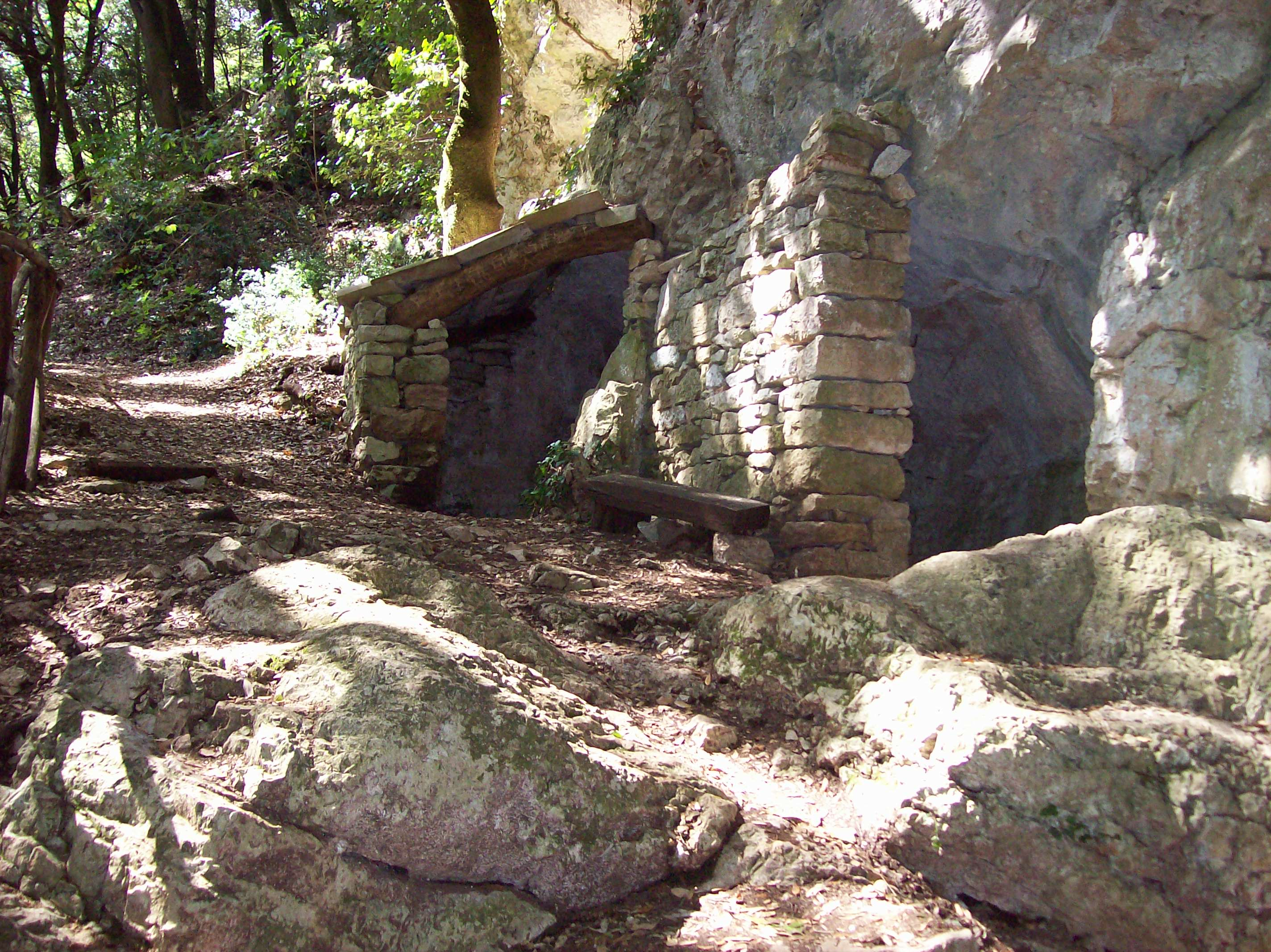
The cave at the Eremo delle Carceri, near Assisi, where Friar Sylvester spent long periods in solitary prayer

Sylvester was ordained a priest and became a canon of the Cathedral of San Rufino in Assisi. The story of his change of life is reported that, in 1209, he had initially sold some bricks to Francis, who, after his dramatic renunciation of his family, was on a campaign to repair the rural chapels around the city which had fallen into disrepair. He later saw Francis with Bernard of Quintavalle, a local nobleman determined to follow Francis and his way of life, who was in the middle of giving away his entire fortune to the poor. Falling prey to greed, Sylvester claimed that he had been paid too little for the bricks he had previously sold Francis and demanded a just compensation, which he was given.

Sylvester later came to regret this spirit of greed he found in himself, and he too renounced his position and joined Francis, becoming the first priest in the primitive fraternity. He was known in the Order for his strict observance of the life of poverty and contemplation. Together with his cousin, Clare, he later prayed for enlightenment to discern the will of God for Francis. He often accompanied Francis during his preaching tours. Once, in the city of Arezzo, it was claimed by the residents that Sylvester's preaching and prayers brought peace to the city, which was falling prey to hatred and violence amongst its citizens.

St. Bonaventure, in a special way, mentions the visions which Sylvester had concerning Francis. Sylvester died in Assisi in 1240. He is one of Francis' four original companions who are buried near his tomb in the Basilica of St. Francis in Assisi. The cause for his canonization was opened by the Friars Minor and has been accepted by the Holy See for further study.

== Sources ==
- 2 Cel 109; LegMaj III,5
- Fior 16
- Walsh, Michael. A New Dictionary of Saints (Liturgical Press, 2007) p. 567
