= Simone Ballachi =

Italian Roman Third Order Dominican

Blessed Simone Ballachi TOSD
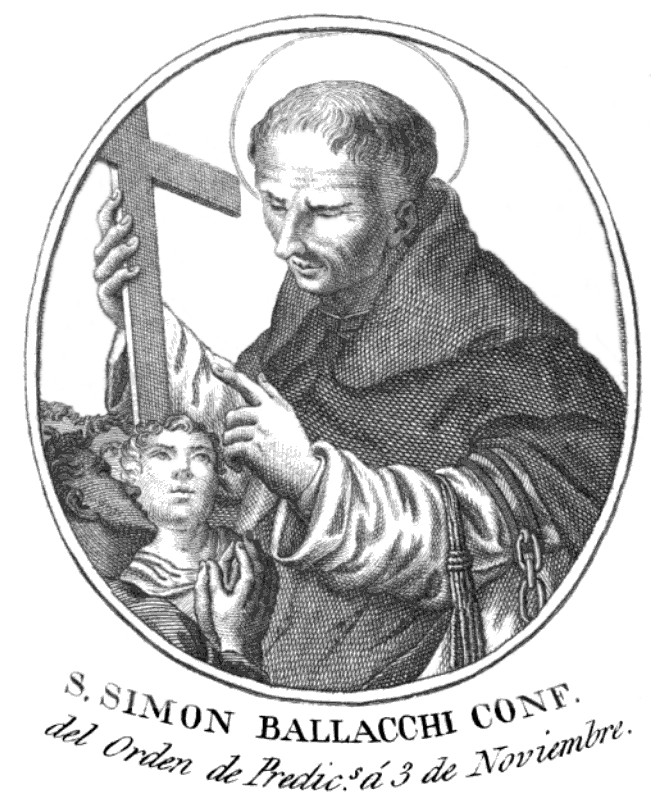
- Born: 1240; Santarcangelo di Romagna, Papal States
- Died: 5 November 1319 (aged 79); Rimini
- Venerated in: Roman Catholic Church
- Beatified: 14 March 1820, Saint Peter's Basilica by Pope Pius VII
- Feast: 3 November
- Attributes: Dominican habit, cross

Simone Ballachi (1240 – 5 November 1319) was an Italian member of the Third Order of Saint Dominic. Ballachi served as a former soldier in Rimini before renouncing that path in favor of the religious life where he became a gardener noted for his strict adherence to the rule of Saint Dominic.

Ballachi's popular devotion received approval from Pope Pius VII on 14 March 1820 which allowed for him to approve the friar's beatification.

== Life ==
Simone Ballachi was born in Rimini in 1240 to the nobleman Count Rodolfo Ballachi.

His noble household had close connections to the Roman Catholic Church since his two paternal uncles would serve as the Bishops of Rimini while a little brother of Ballachi's would become a priest. The uncles served one after the other as bishop and were Lorenzo (d. 1302) who was a member of the Order of Preachers and Federico (d. 1321). Ballachi received training as a soldier and was expected to take over his father's estates though against the latter's wishes he renounced this and joined the Third Order of Saint Dominic in 1267.

Ballachi served as the convent's gardener – despite having a limited knowledge of how best to care for a garden, but grew to love it almost as soon as he began working in the garden. He would sweep the convent each week. He became noted amongst the friars there for his simple life and for his strict adherence to the order's rule while becoming a renowned catechist for children. He also began to discipline himself with corporal penances for the conversion of sinners while for two decades wearing an iron chain as penance. For five entire Lenten seasons he fasted on bread and water alone and his fasting's weakened him to the point where his superiors had to intervene in order for him to sustain his health and not damage it.

He experienced several visions of the Devil but also received visions of the Blessed Virgin Mary. He also had visions of Dominic of Osma and Peter of Verona who would speak to him to console him in times of hardship. Some friars even reported seeing his cell glowing and heard angelic voices from his cell. One time a voice even said to him: "Fear not Simone for thou hast found favor before God". Ballachi also fostered a special devotion to Catherine of Alexandria and on one occasion she appeared to him and healed him when he was suffering from a severe headache. He became blind in 1297 and devoted the remainder of his life to solitude. Ballachi died on 5 November 1319.

== External links and additional sources ==
- Cheney, David M. "Diocese of Rimini". Catholic-Hierarchy.org. (for Chronology of Bishops) ^{[self-published]}
- Chow, Gabriel. "Diocese of Rimini (Italy)". GCatholic.org. (for Chronology of Bishops) ^{[self-published]}
- Saints SQPN
