= Battle of Thomond =

| Date | 14 July 1328 |
| Location | near Thurles, County Tipperary |
| Result | Thomond victory |

Belligerents
| Lord Thomond's forces | Earl of Ulster's forces |

Commanders and leaders
| Maurice FitzGerald; Brian O'Brien | William Burke; Murtaugh O'Brien |

Casualties and losses
| 80 | |

The Battle of Thomond (Irish: Áth an Urchair) was fought in Ireland on 14 July 1328 between the forces of William de Burgh and an army led by Brian Bán Ó Briain, Lord of Thomond. It was fought near Thurles in modern County Tipperary and featured powerful Gaelic and Anglo-Irish figures on both sides.

== Background ==
The Battle of Thomond was largely the culmination of power struggles in Northern Munster in the 1320s and in-fighting within both the Gaelic Irish and Hiberno-Norman dynasties. An ongoing conflict between Brian Bán Ó Briain and his cousin Muircheartach Ó Briain over the rulership of the Kingdom of Thomond had seen them fight on opposing sides at the Battle of Dysert O'Dea in 1318. A year earlier, Muirchertach's brother Diarmait had killed Brian Bán's brother Donnchad near Corcomroe Abbey, County Clare.

In 1322, Brian Bán attacked and burned the English fortress of Atthassol on the River Suir. This had been in response to increased encroachment on his lands in Thomond by English settlers in Connacht. In July 1326, Ó Briain further infuriated Norman Lords by attending a meeting in Kilkenny where it was alleged that he, James Butler, Richard FitzGerald, the Earl of Kildare, John de Bermingham, the Earl of Louth, and Richard de Ledrede, the Bishop of Ossory agreed to rebel against King Edward II, assume control of Ireland, and elect and crown Maurice Fitzgerald as King of Ireland. Fitzgerald was a rival of William de Burgh.

== The Battle ==
Im July 1328 de Burgh, under whose protection Atthassol fell, joined forces with Muirchertach and raised an allied force of Hiberno-Normans as well as some allied Gaelic families the O'Briens and McNamaras of East Clare, the Cullens of West Clare, and the O'Connors of Connacht, and marched into Thomond. In response, Brian Bán formed an army consisting of his own local allies including Maurice Fitzgerald. The battle resulted in a victory for Ó Briain and Fitzgerald, who lost only 80 men.

The Annals of the Four Masters records that in 1328, an army led by Murtough O'Brien and the Clann-Cuilein the Mac Namaras against Brian; but Murtough was defeated, and Conor O'Brien, Donnell of the Donnells, the son of Cumara Mac Namara, with many others, were slain.

== See also ==
- Burke Civil War, 1330s
