= Irish martial arts =

Boxing, wrestling, kick-fighting and stick-fighting

There are a number of traditional martial arts native to Ireland. The Irish language term for "martial arts" is ealaíona comhraic. Traditional styles include dornálaíocht (boxing), coraíocht (wrestling), speachóireacht (kicking), and bataireacht (stick-fighting).

== Boxing ==
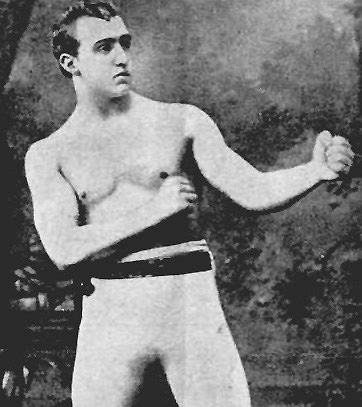
Charlie Mitchell demonstrating the traditional bare knuckle boxing stance.

Dornálaíocht is the Irish word for boxing, dorn meaning fist.

The style or stance used in dornálaíocht, a form of bare-knuckle boxing, is sometimes reflected in Irish caricatures such as that of the Notre Dame Leprechaun. The lead hand stays at a greater distance from the body than in modern boxing. The lead arm's shoulder stays tight against the jaw while the other arm is tucked tightly to the body, using its fist to guard the jaw. This is due to the bare-knuckle nature of the style. Without large boxing gloves, it is not recommended to tuck and cover up from a punch. Instead, the lead hand is used to block the incoming attack while side stepping and back stepping to create an angle or swaying the torso away from or towards the opponent. The more distantly placed lead hand is also used to more easily obtain a single collar clinch, so that another aspect of dornálaíocht can then be employed: dirty boxing. In Irish-American schools, dornálaíocht is sometimes referred to as "Irish Boxing", "Irish Scrapping" or "Scrapping".

Raidió Teilifís Éireann's Prime Time, which discusses Irish related social and political problems, had an hour-long documentary on the Irish Travellers and also their bare knuckle boxing heritage.

== Wrestling ==
Coraíocht is the Irish word for wrestling. Ireland has its own form of wrestling, notably collar and elbow wrestling. Coraíocht is also the name of a back hold style of wrestling practised in Ireland. Coraíocht can be practised with or without a jacket and features a wide array of trips, mares, takedowns, slams, pins, advancements, submissions, grapevines, and escapes. The most quoted "modern" way of describing the philosophy behind coraíocht is "use balance and speed to obtain position so that strength can then be applied to the leverage created". In Irish-American–based systems, coraíocht is sometimes referred to as "Irish Wrestling", "Celtic Wrestling", "Irish Scuffling", "Scuffling", and "Collar-and-Elbow".

Notable Irish wrestlers include Danno O'Mahony of County Cork (former world champion), Steve Casey of County Kerry (former world champion), and Con O'Kelly, who competed for Britain in the 1908 Summer Olympics. Irish-American wrestlers include John McMahon.

== Stick fighting ==
Bataireacht, an Irish term referring to stick fighting, is associated with the use of the shillelagh and other fighting sticks. The sticks used for Bataireacht are not of a standardised size, as there are various styles of Bataireacht, using various kinds of sticks. The most preferred of these kinds is a branch or walking stick.

By the 18th century, Bataireacht became increasingly associated with Irish gangs called "factions". Irish faction fights involved large groups of people who would engage in melees at county fairs, weddings, funerals, or other gatherings. Some historians, as summarised by James S. Donnelly Jr. (1983) in "Irish Peasants: Violence & Political Unrest, 1780") have suggested that faction fighting had class and political overtones.
