= Battle of Cluain Immorrais =

1406 battle in Ireland

Date	1406
Location	Ireland
Result	Offaly victory

Belligerents
Kingdom of Offaly	Normans

The Cluan Immorrais is a 15th-century Irish battle that pitted the Kingdom of Uí Failghe against the Galls of Meath. The battle was fought in 1406, and Uí Falighe was victorious.
