= Sack of Dun Gallimhe =

1247 battle

- Part of the Irish-English conflicts
Date	1247
Location	Galway
Result	Gaelic Irish victory

Belligerents
Kingdom of Connacht	Lordship of Ireland

The sack of Dun Gallimhe, also known as the sack of Galway Castle, took place in 1247 between the Irish of Connacht and English colonists, resulting in an Irish victory.
