= 1240 =

1240 in various calendars
- Gregorian calendar: 1240; MCCXL
- Ab urbe condita: 1993
- Armenian calendar: 689; ԹՎ ՈՁԹ
- Assyrian calendar: 5990
- Balinese saka calendar: 1161–1162
- Bengali calendar: 646–647
- Berber calendar: 2190
- English Regnal year: 24 Hen. 3 – 25 Hen. 3
- Buddhist calendar: 1784
- Burmese calendar: 602
- Byzantine calendar: 6748–6749
- Chinese calendar: 己亥年 (Earth Pig); 3937 or 3730 — to — 庚子年 (Metal Rat); 3938 or 3731
- Coptic calendar: 956–957
- Discordian calendar: 2406
- Ethiopian calendar: 1232–1233
- Hebrew calendar: 5000–5001
- Hindu calendars
- Vikram Samvat: 1296–1297
- Shaka Samvat: 1161–1162
- Kali Yuga: 4340–4341
- Holocene calendar: 11240
- Igbo calendar: 240–241
- Iranian calendar: 618–619
- Islamic calendar: 637–638
- Japanese calendar: En'ō 2 / Ninji 1 (仁治元年)
- Javanese calendar: 1149–1150
- Julian calendar: 1240; MCCXL
- Korean calendar: 3573
- Minguo calendar: 672 before ROC 民前672年
- Nanakshahi calendar: −228
- Thai solar calendar: 1782–1783
- Tibetan calendar: ས་མོ་ཕག་ལོ་ (female Earth-Boar); 1366 or 985 or 213 — to — ལྕགས་ཕོ་བྱི་བ་ལོ་ (male Iron-Rat); 1367 or 986 or 214

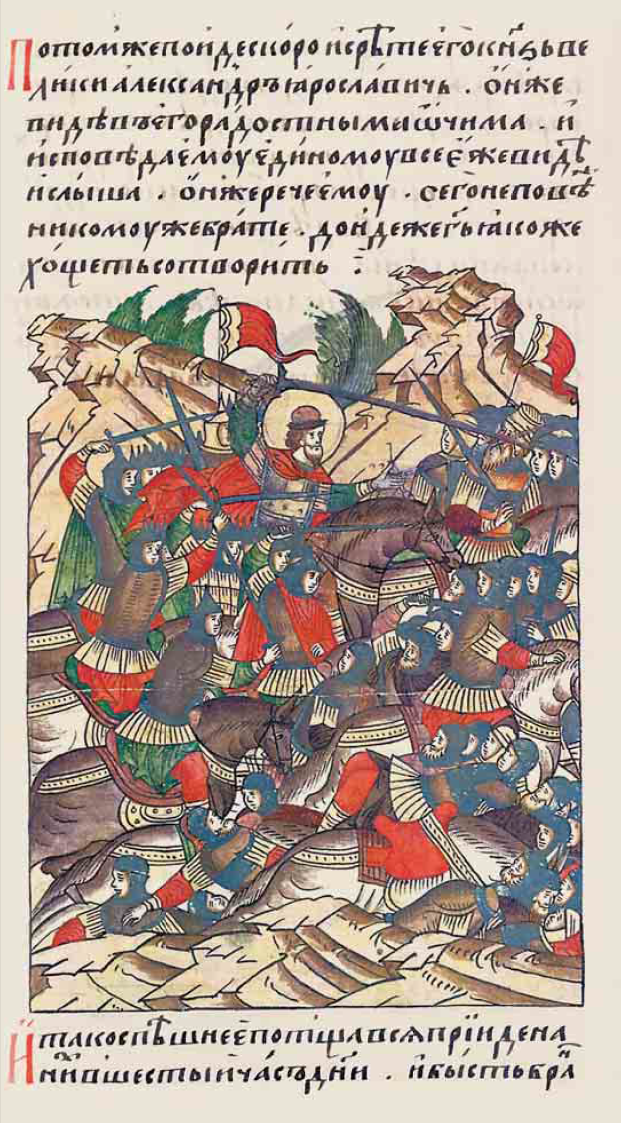
Depiction of the Battle of Neva (1240)

Year 1240 (MCCXL) was a leap year starting on Sunday of the Julian calendar.

== Events ==
=== By place ===
==== Europe ====
- May 24 – Duke Skule Bårdsson, claimant to the Norwegian throne, is defeated by King Haakon IV ("the Old") and his supporters. He seeks refuge in Elgeseter Priory in Trondheim, and Haakon burns down the monastery, in which Skule is burned alive. Haakon becomes the undisputed ruler; this ends the civil war era in Norway, after 110 years.
- July 15 – Battle of the Neva: A Swedish army under Bishop Thomas sails up the Gulf of Finland in their longboats. They proceed into the Neva River with the aim of seizing control over Lake Ladoga and from there, striking at the city of Novgorod. Prince Alexander rallies his druzhina comparable to the 'household' of western European countries, and decisively routs the Swedish forces, saving the Novgorod Republic from a full-scale enemy invasion from the North. As a result, Alexander wins his first military victory at the age of 19 and receives the title of 'Nevsky'.
- August – Siege of Faenza: Frederick II lays siege to the town of Faenza during the war of the Guelphs and Ghibellines. Meanwhile, Frederick makes an alliance with Pisa to support his campaign against the Papal States.
- September – 1240 Izborsk and Pskov campaign: An alliance of the Livonian Order, the Bishopric of Dorpat and the pretender-prince Yaroslav Vladimirovich of Pskov besiege and conquer the border fortress of Izborsk in the Pskov Land. After Pskovian defenders fail to retake the town, the allied forces advance to the capital Pskov itself, compelling it to surrender, resulting in the brief overthrow of the pro-Suzdalian faction that supports prince Alexander Nevsky.
- Winter
  - Alexander Nevsky quarrels with the nobles (boyars) and merchants of Novgorod, probably about peaceful trade with the westerners. He is banished, along with his mother, wife and his druzhina to take up residence in the region around Moscow, a minor town on the western border of the Grand Principality of Vladimir.
  - 1240–1241 Votia campaign begins when an alliance of the Livonian Order, the Bishopric of Ösel–Wiek and Estonians Chud march into Votia.
- Reconquista – King Sancho II of Portugal ("the Pious") conquers the city of Ayamonte from the Almoravids, securing the Portuguese position in Al-Andalus.

==== Africa ====
- Summer – As-Salih Ayyub becomes ruler of Egypt, after deposing his half-brother Al-Adil II. Meanwhile, other members of the Ayyubid dynasty are conspiring to depose him and replace him with his uncle, As-Salih Ismail. During his reign, As-Salih begins buying large numbers of Kipchak slaves, to form an elite core in the Egyptian army, known as Mamluks.

==== Levant ====
- October 10 – Richard of Cornwall, brother of King Henry III of England, arrives at Acre for a pilgrimage to Jerusalem. His pilgrimage has the approval of Emperor Frederick II, who is married to his younger sister, Isabella of England, and gives him the task to make arrangements with the Military Orders. On his arrival, Richard travels to Ascalon, where he is met by ambassadors from As-Salih Ayyub. As a negotiator, he is successful in the release of prisoners captured in the Battle at Gaza (1239), and he also assists with the building of the citadel in Ascalon.

==== Mongol Empire ====
- Winter – The Mongols under Batu Khan cross the frozen river Dnieper and lay siege to the city of Kiev. On December 6, the walls are rendered rubble by Chinese catapults and the Mongols pour into the city. Brutal hand-to-hand street fighting occurs, the Kievans are eventually forced to fall back to the central parts of the city. Many people take refuge in the Church of the Blessed Virgin. As scores of terrified Kievans climb onto the Church's upper balcony to shield themselves from Mongol arrows, their collective weight strains its infrastructure, causing the roof to collapse and crush countless citizens under its weight. Of a total population of 50,000, all but 2,000 are massacred.

=== By topic ===
==== Religion ====
- June 12 – The Disputation of Paris begins at the court of King Louis IX ("the Saint"), where four rabbis defend the Talmud against Nicholas Donin's accusations of blasphemy.
- Pope Gregory IX authorizes a Crusade against Novgorod, hoping that the Kievan Rus' will be too preoccupied dealing with the raiding Mongols to the east to defend.

== Births ==
- April – Simon de Montfort the Younger, English nobleman and knight (d. 1271)
- May 2 – Duzong (or Zhao Qi), Chinese emperor (d. 1274)
- September 29 – Margaret, queen consort of Scotland (d. 1275)
- Abraham Abulafia, Moorish Jewish philosopher (d. 1292)
- Afonso Mendes de Melo, Portuguese nobleman (d. 1280)
- Agostino Novello, Italian priest and prior general (d. 1309)
- Albert II, Margrave of Meissen ("the Degenerate"), German nobleman (d. 1314)
- Andrea dei Conti, Italian nobleman and priest (d. 1302)
- Balian of Ibelin, Cypriot nobleman and knight (d. 1302)
- Benedict XI, pope of the Catholic Church (d. 1304)
- Conrad of Lichtenberg, German bishop (d. 1299)
- Frederick III, German nobleman and knight (d. 1302)
- Giovanni Pelingotto, Italian hermit and monk (d. 1304)
- Simone Ballachi, Italian monk and friar (d. 1319)
- Approximate date
- Arnaldus de Villa Nova, Spanish physician (d. 1311)
- Beka I Jaqeli, Georgian prince (mtavari) (d. 1306)
- Conrad I, German nobleman and regent (d. 1304)
- Daumantas of Pskov, Lithuanian prince (d. 1299)
- Henry VI, count of Luxembourg and Arlon (d. 1288)
- Jean d'Eppe, French nobleman and knight (d. 1293)
- Magnus Ladulås (Birgersson), king of Sweden (d. 1290)
- Siger of Brabant, French philosopher (d. 1284)

== Deaths ==
- January 23 – Albert of Pisa, Italian Franciscan friar
- February 18 – Hōjō Tokifusa, Japanese nobleman and regent (b. 1175)
- February 24 – Egidia de Lacy, Lady of Connacht, Norman noblewoman
- March 6 – Sylvester of Assisi, Italian priest (b. 1175)
- April 11 – Llywelyn the Great, Welsh king of Gwynedd
- May 24 – Skule Bårdsson, Norwegian nobleman
- May 27 – William de Warenne, 5th Earl of Surrey, English nobleman
- after May 31 – Anastasia of Greater Poland, Polish noblewoman (b. 1164)
- June – Germanus II (Nauplius), patriarch of Constantinople
- July 22 – John de Lacy, 2nd Earl of Lincoln, English nobleman (b.1192)
- July 24 – Conrad of Thuringia, German Grand Master
- August 14 – Ludmilla of Bohemia, duchess of Bavaria
- August 31 – Raymond Nonnatus, Spanish cardinal
- October 13 – Malik Altunia, Indian governor and ruler
- November 16
  - Edmund of Abingdon, English archbishop (b. 1174)
  - Ibn Arabi, Andalusian philosopher and poet (b. 1165)
- December 6 – Constance, queen consort of Bohemia (b. 1180)
- Alan of Beccles, English clergyman and secretary (b. 1195)
- (or 1250?) Alexander of Villedieu, French teacher and poet (b. 1175)
- Conrad of Lichtenau, German nobleman and chronicler
- Fujiwara no Hideyoshi, Japanese waka poet (b. 1184)
- Guilhabert de Castres, French bishop and theologian
- Hartmann, Count of Württemberg, German nobleman and knight (b. 1160)
- John FitzRobert, English nobleman and knight (b. 1190)
- Tbeli Abuserisdze, Georgian scholar and writer (b. 1190)
- Thomas Moulton, English nobleman and knight
- Approximate date
- Infanta Branca, Lady of Guadalajara, Portuguese princess and nun (b. 1198)
- Caesarius of Heisterbach, German hagiographer (b. 1180)
