= 1246 =

1246 in various calendars
- Gregorian calendar: 1246; MCCXLVI
- Ab urbe condita: 1999
- Armenian calendar: 695; ԹՎ ՈՂԵ
- Assyrian calendar: 5996
- Balinese saka calendar: 1167–1168
- Bengali calendar: 652–653
- Berber calendar: 2196
- English Regnal year: 30 Hen. 3 – 31 Hen. 3
- Buddhist calendar: 1790
- Burmese calendar: 608
- Byzantine calendar: 6754–6755
- Chinese calendar: 乙巳年 (Wood Snake); 3943 or 3736 — to — 丙午年 (Fire Horse); 3944 or 3737
- Coptic calendar: 962–963
- Discordian calendar: 2412
- Ethiopian calendar: 1238–1239
- Hebrew calendar: 5006–5007
- Hindu calendars
- Vikram Samvat: 1302–1303
- Shaka Samvat: 1167–1168
- Kali Yuga: 4346–4347
- Holocene calendar: 11246
- Igbo calendar: 246–247
- Iranian calendar: 624–625
- Islamic calendar: 643–644
- Japanese calendar: Kangen 4 (寛元４年)
- Javanese calendar: 1155–1156
- Julian calendar: 1246; MCCXLVI
- Korean calendar: 3579
- Minguo calendar: 666 before ROC 民前666年
- Nanakshahi calendar: −222
- Thai solar calendar: 1788–1789
- Tibetan calendar: ཤིང་མོ་སྦྲུལ་ལོ་ (female Wood-Snake); 1372 or 991 or 219 — to — མེ་ཕོ་རྟ་ལོ་ (male Fire-Horse); 1373 or 992 or 220

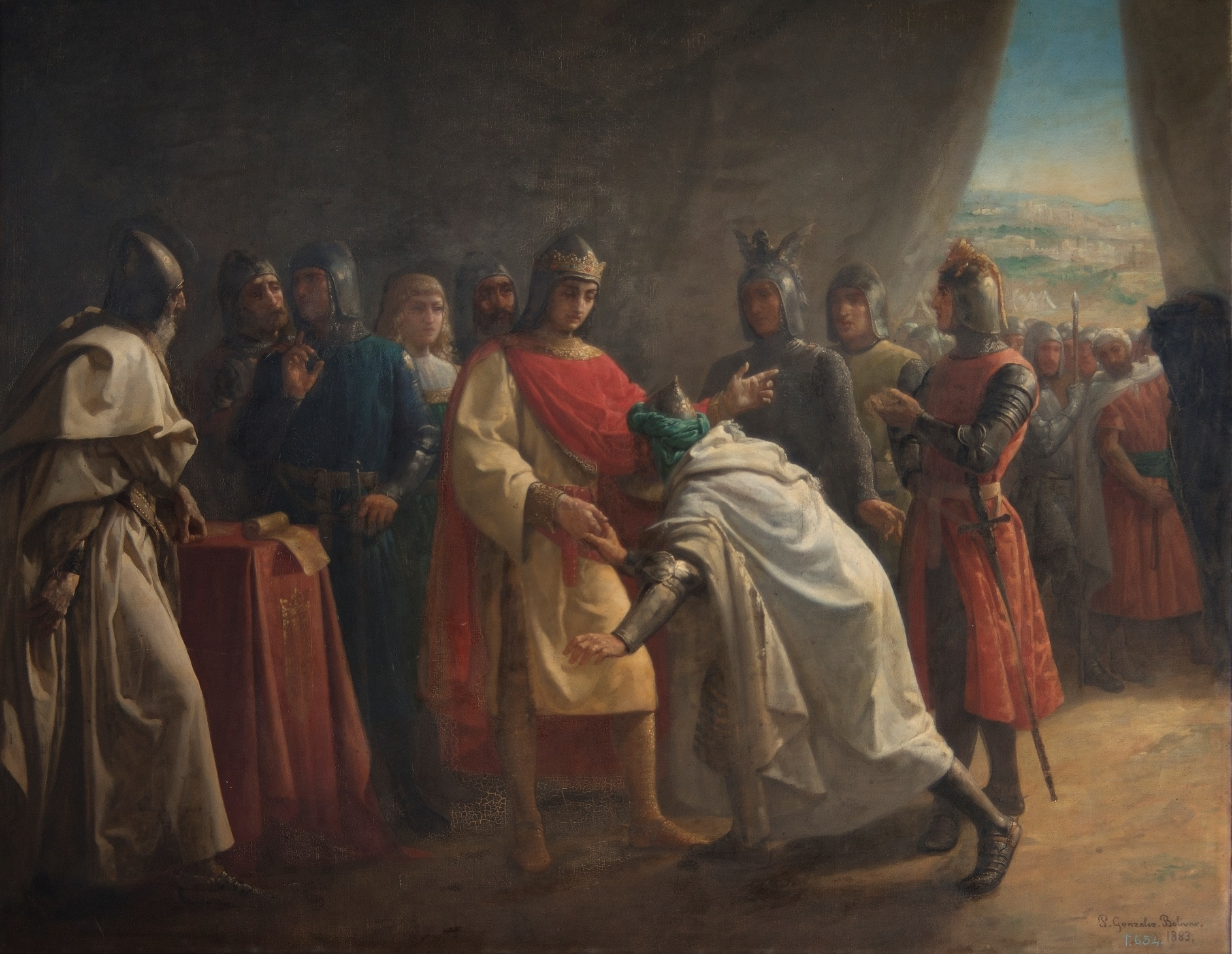
Sultan Muhammad I (right) submits to King Ferdinand III (the Saint) (1883)

Year 1246 (MCCXLVI) was a common year starting on Monday of the Julian calendar.

== Events ==
=== By place ===
==== Europe ====
- February 28 – Siege of Jaén: Castilian forces, led by King Ferdinand III (the Saint), manage to take the city of Jaén from the Andalucians. In a combined assault with the knights of the Order of Santiago, the city is handed over by Sultan Muhammad I, who accepts Ferdinand's overlordship in exchange for a 20-year truce. The Emirate of Granada becomes a vassal state of the Kingdom of Castile.
- May 22 – Henry Raspe is elected anti-king in Germany in opposition to Conrad IV of Germany and Conrad's father, the excommunicated emperor Frederick II.
- June 15 – Battle of the Leitha River: Hungarian forces, under King Béla IV, defeat Duke Frederick II (the Quarrelsome) at the banks of the Leitha River. Frederick is killed (leaving no male heirs); the House of Babenberg is dissolved. Emperor Frederick II places the fiefs of Austria and Styria under his rule. This ends the Austrian claims to the western counties of Hungary.
- November – Michael II Asen, ruler (tsar) of the Bulgarian Empire, succeeds his brother Kaliman I (possibly poisoned). He confirms the reconquest of Bulgarian territories against John III (Doukas Vatatzes), Byzantine ruler of the Empire of Nicaea.
- Frederick II suppresses a Sicilian revolt and deports the remaining Muslim inhabitants of Lucera (approximate date).

==== Mongol Empire ====
- August 24 – Güyük Khan, eldest son of Ögedei Khan, is enthroned as the 3rd Great Khan of the Mongol Empire (which is witnessed by a papal mission under Giovanni da Pian del Carpine) at Karakorum. Güyük reverses several edicts of his mother, Töregene Khatun, and orders Eljigidei, Mongol viceroy of Persia, to advance into Syria and prepare an attack on Baghdad.
- September 30 – Yaroslav II, father of Alexander Nevsky, is poisoned by Töregene Khatun, after he is summoned by Güyük Khan in Karakorum.

==== Levant ====
- Alice of Champagne, queen and regent of Jerusalem, dies after a 3-year reign. She is succeeded by her son, Henry I of Cyprus (the Fat), who appoints Balian III of Beirut as his bailli and confirms Philip of Montfort in the possession of Tyre.
- 2 October – Damascus falls to the Ayyubid vizier Mu'in al-Din Hasan ibn al-Shaykh after a siege of some four months.

==== Asia ====
- February 16 – Emperor Go-Saga abdicates the throne in favor of his 3-year-old son, Go-Fukakusa, who becomes the 89th Emperor of Japan.

=== By topic ===
==== Arts ====
- Robert Grosseteste translates Aristotle's Nicomachean Ethics from Greek into Latin, which marks the true start of the rediscovery of the philosopher by Medieval Europe.

==== Nature ====
- The perihelion of the Earth's orbit coincides with the December solstice.

==== Religion ====
- Beaulieu Abbey in England, founded earlier by King John, is dedicated in the presence of King Henry III, Queen Eleanor and 7-year-old Prince Edward.
- Katedralskolan in Uppsala is established beside Uppsala Cathedral as a seminary for the clergy (the founding year according to tradition).

== Births ==
- March 8 – Nikkō Shōnin, Japanese religious leader (d. 1333)
- March 24 – Henry Bate of Mechelen, Brabantian philosopher
- September 14 – John FitzAlan, English nobleman (d. 1272)
- Angelo da Furci, Italian priest, orator and theologian (d. 1327)
- Drakpa Odzer, Tibetan Imperial Preceptor (Dishi) (d. 1303)
- Enrique Enríquez (the Elder), Castilian nobleman (d. 1323)
- Hugh of Lincoln (Little Saint), English Jewish boy (d. 1255)
- Jutta of Denmark (or Judith), Danish princess and abbess
- Konoe Motohira, Japanese nobleman and regent (d. 1268)
- Nicholas of Tolentino, Italian monk, friar and mystic (d. 1305)
- Paolo Malatesta, Italian nobleman and diplomat (d. 1285)
- Riccobaldo of Ferrara, Italian chronicler and geographer
- Safi al-Din al-Hindi, Indian scholar and theologian (d. 1315)
- Takezaki Suenaga, Japanese retainer and samurai (d. 1314)
- Teodosije the Hilandarian, Serbian hagiographer (d. 1328)

== Deaths ==
- February 25 – Dafydd ap Llywelyn, Welsh prince (b. 1212)
- April 15 – Peter González (Telmo), Castilian priest (b 1190)
- May 19 – Umiliana de' Cerchi, Italian noblewoman (b. 1219)
- June 4 – Isabella of Angoulême, queen consort of England
- June 15 – Frederick II, duke of Austria and Styria (b. 1211)
- June 16 – Lutgardis (or Lutgarde), Flemish nun (b. 1182)
- June 28 – Al-Mansur Ibrahim, Ayyubid governor and ruler
- September 20 – Michael of Chernigov, Kievan Grand Prince
- September 30 – Yaroslav II, Kievan Grand Prince (b. 1191)
- October 22 – Mieszko II (the Fat), duke of Kalisz-Wieluń
- November 3 – Robert de Bingham, bishop of Salisbury
- November 8 – Berengaria (the Great), queen of Castile
- Alice of Champagne, queen consort of Cyprus (b. 1193)
- Ednyfed Fychan, Welsh nobleman and knight (b. 1170)
- Elias of Dereham, English master stonemason designer
- Erard of Brienne-Ramerupt, French nobleman (b. 1170)
- Eva Marshal, Cambro-Norman noblewoman (b. 1203)
- Geoffrey II of Villehardouin, prince of Achaea (b. 1195)
- Henry Audley (or Aldithel), English nobleman (b. 1175)
- Hōjō Tsunetoki, Japanese nobleman and regent (b. 1224)
- Kaliman Asen I, ruler of the Bulgarian Empire (b. 1234)
- Kaykhusraw II, ruler of the Sultanate of Rum (b. 1221)
- Matteo Rosso Orsini, Italian nobleman and politician
- Muhammad Al-Makki, Arab ruler and explorer (b. 1145)
- Richard FitzRoy, illegitimate son of John, King of England (Lackland)
- Tello Téllez de Meneses, bishop of Palencia (b. 1170)
- Temüge (or Otgon), brother of Genghis Khan (b. 1168)
- Theodora Angelina, Byzantine noblewoman (b. 1190)
- Walter IV (the Great), French nobleman and knight
- Walter Stewart, Scottish politician and High Steward
- Wansong Xingxiu, Chinese Buddhist monk (b. 1166)
