= 1190s =

Decade

The 1190s was a decade of the Julian calendar which began on January 1, 1190, and ended on December 31, 1199.

== Events ==
=== 1190 ===
==== By place ====
====== Byzantine Empire ======
- Spring – A German expeditionary force (some 15,000 men) led by Emperor Frederick I (Barbarossa) marches towards Constantinople, on the way to the Holy Land. Emperor Isaac II (Angelos), suspicious that Frederick is planning to conquer Constantinople, attempts to stop him by attacking the Crusaders. The German forces are too strong and they capture Adrianople. A peace treaty is signed by both Isaac and Frederick, that ensures the Germans are given supplies, and free passage through to Palestina.
- Isaac II starts a campaign against the Bulgarians, who claim their independence. After passing the Balkan Mountains, Isaac marches westward to besiege Tarnovo, the new Bulgarian capital. Meanwhile, the Byzantine fleet reaches the Danube River in order to block the way of Cuman reinforcements from the North. The defense of Tarnovo is led by Ivan Asen I, emperor (Tsar) of Bulgaria. After spreading rumors of the arrival of a Cuman army to relieve the city, Isaac orders to retreat to Stara Zagora.
- Battle of Tryavna: Byzantine forces under Isaac II are ambushed and defeated by the Bulgarians in a mountain pass, near Tryavna. In panic, the Byzantines break up and begin a disorganized retreat. Isaac barely escapes, his Varangian Guard has to cut a path through their own soldiers, enabling their emperor's flight from the rout. The Bulgarians capture the imperial treasure, including the golden helmet of Isaac, his crown, and the Imperial Cross which contains a wooden piece of the Holy Cross.

====== Third Crusade ======
- March – Frederick I leaves Adrianople to Gallipoli at the Dardanelles to embark, with the help of Byzantine transports, to cross into Asia Minor. On April 25, he enters territory of the Seljuk Sultanate of Rum under the rule of Sultan Kilij Arslan II. Although promised to let the German Crusaders pass peaceably through his domains, Kilij Arslan harasses Frederick's forces with hit-and-run attacks. On May 7, a Turkish army (some 10,000 men) is defeated at the Battle of Philomelion, by 2,000 Crusaders.
- March 25 – Conrad of Montferrat sails south with a Crusader fleet (some 50 ships) from Tyre. As Conrad's fleet approaches the harbour of Acre, an equally sized Muslim fleet sorties out to meet the Crusaders in open battle. Eventually, the Ayyubid fleet is blockaded (supported by Danish and Pisan ships) in the port. Acre is again cut off from reinforcements; the city's supplies are exhausted, and the Muslim garrison has to resort to eating their own beasts. In the event, troops are driven to cannibalism.
- April – After a long siege Muslim forces under Saladin capture Beaufort Castle from Reginald of Sidon who has offered to hand over the castle to Saladin on the condition that he has three months to remove his family to a place of safety. At the end of the three months, Saladin expects the castle to be handed over but finds that Reginald has used the time to strengthen the castle against a siege. He is imprisoned at Damascus – the castle's garrison finally surrenders in return for Reginald's release.
- May 5 – Siege of Acre: A Crusader force under King Guy of Lusignan attacks the city with three siege engines, but all are destroyed by the Muslim defenders with Greek fire, a highly flammable liquid. An Egyptian flotilla is able to avoid the Pisan fleet (some 50 ships) and resupply the city with new provisions. Saladin launches a massive eight-day attack on the Crusaders two weeks later. Meanwhile, in the Crusader camp the conditions are deteriorating by disease and famine, among the soldiers.
- May 18 – Battle of Iconium: German forces under Frederick I defeat the Seljuk army (40,000 men) in a pitched battle. They are routed, leaving the city at the mercy of the German Crusaders. Frederick does not pursue the Seljuks, because his forces have been weakened by food shortage for the previous weeks. His 23-year-old son, Frederick VI, takes Iconium (modern-day Konya) and proceeds to massacre the citizens. The Germans take booty amounting to 100,000 marks in the Turkish capital.
- June 10 – Frederick I drowns while crossing (or bathing in) the Göksu River near Selucia (modern-day Silifke) in Armenian Cilicia. The German Crusaders are demoralized and exhausted by the summer heat, Frederick VI takes over the command of his father, carrying with him the emperor's body preserved in a barrel of vinegar. Some of the German nobles decide to return home with their followers; Frederick continues with his army (some 5,000 men) and eventually reaches Antioch, on June 21.
- September 24 – A Crusader fleet attempts to destroy the Tower of Flies at Acre, which guards the city's harbour, by ramming vessels loaded with combustibles into it. At a critical moment, the ships collide with one another and are badly damaged. A specially built Pisan vessel resembling a floating castle and outfitted with mangonels, is set afire during a sortie from the harbour by a Muslim flotilla.
- November 24 – The 18-year-old Isabella I, half-sister of Sibylla, Queen of Jerusalem, marries Conrad of Montferrat at Acre making him de facto king of Jerusalem (as Conrad I). He has the support of her mother Maria Comnena and stepfather Balian of Ibelin, as well as Reginald of Sidon and other major nobles in the Crusader States.
- The Teutonic Order is founded at Acre by German knights of Lübeck and Bremen. The Order is formed to aid Christians on their pilgrimages to the Holy Land and to establish hospitals (approximate date).

====== Europe ======
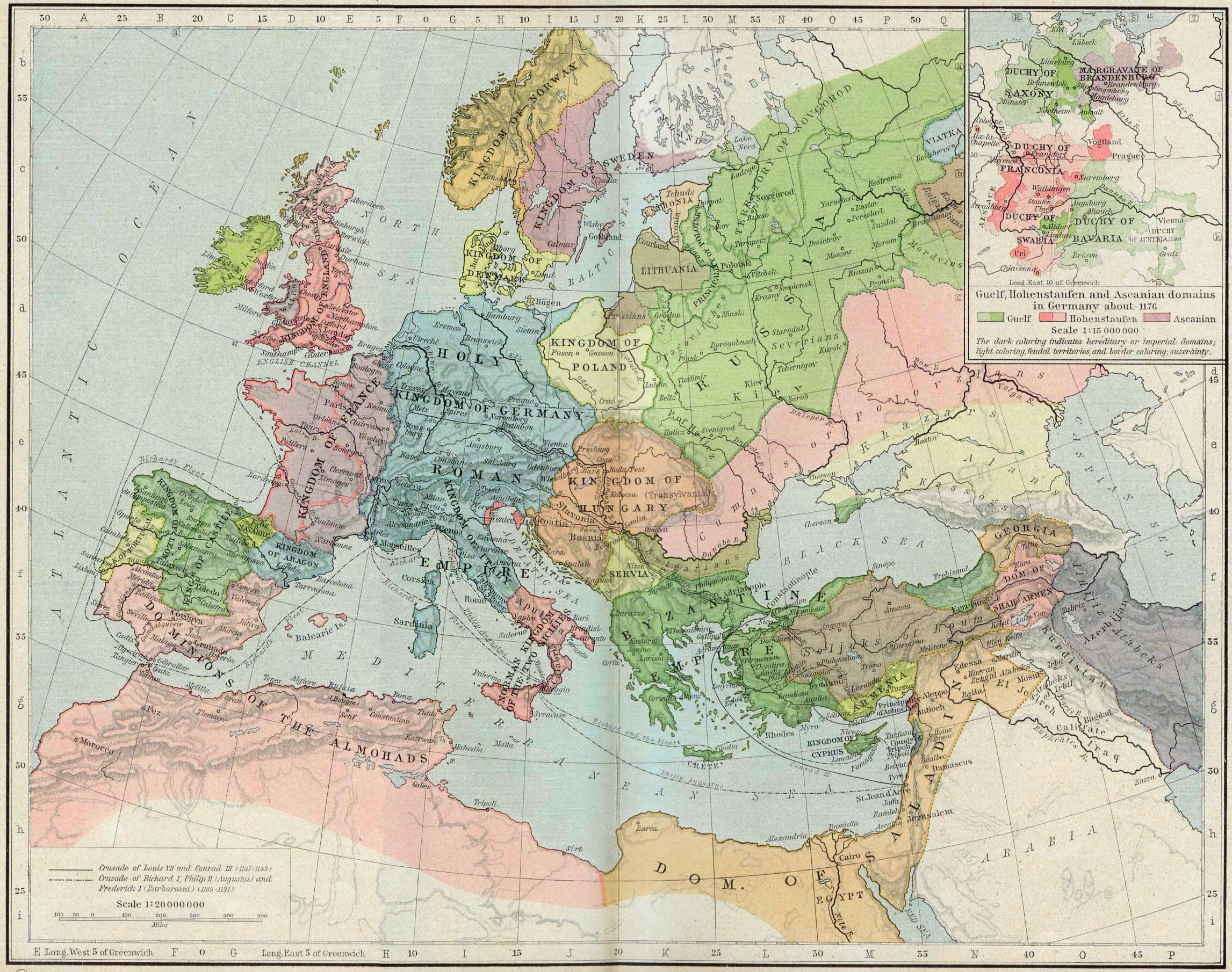
Europe in 1190

- July 4 – King Richard I (the Lion Heart) and Philip II (Augustus), meet at Vézelay and agree to divide the spoils of the Crusade equally between themselves. They march to the coast and then make their way across the Mediterranean, taking different routes. Richard travels with an expeditionary force (some 17,000 men) via Marseille and Philip travels with a smaller contingent (some 15,000 men) via Genoa. Richard has some 100 ships at his disposal, several of which are from Norman ports, others from Shoreham and Southampton.
- September – Richard I arrives in Sicily at the head of a Crusader army and demands the release of his sister Joan of England, queen of Sicily, who is held hostage by the usurper Tancred of Lecce. He also demands that Tancred fulfill the financial commitments made by the late King William II (the Good) to the Crusade. Tancred refuses the financial demand but he agrees to release Joan, on September 28.
- October 4 – Richard I captures Messina, after looting and burning the city he establishes his base there. Richard insists that his own banner be erected over the city, but this creates tension between Richard and Philip II, who has joined him with his forces. Tancred accepts a peace agreement, and pays Richard 20,000 ounces of gold. Friendly relations are restored, Richard agrees to split the gold with Philip.
- King Henry VI, eldest son of Frederick I, grants Henry I (the Brave) the title of Duke of Brabant. Henry tries to expand his power and soon quarrels with Count Baldwin V, duke of Hainaut.
- December – Richard I and Philip II stay in Sicily over the winter months waiting for the weather to improve before continuing their journey to the Holy Land.
- Siege of Silves – the Almohad caliph, Abu Yusuf Yaqub al-Mansur, fails to reconquer Silves, Portugal.

====== = England = ======
The English "feudal empire" of the Angevins in 1190

- London adopts the Cross of St. George, the red cross on a white background. The flag is also used by the fleet of Genoa, and allows the ships from London to use the flag for protection when they enter the Mediterranean on trading missions.
- March 16 – A massacre and mass-suicide of the Jews in York, results in the deaths of 150–500 Jews in Clifford's Tower.

==== By topic ====
====== Art and Science ======
- On the Harmony of Religions and Philosophy (ar. Kitab fasl al-maqal), by Averroes, is first published.
- Speculum Virginum, a German manuscript, is published (approximate date).

====== Education ======
- Emo of Friesland, a Frisian scholar and abbot, commences his study at what will become the University of Oxford.

====== Religion ======
- Cartmel Priory is founded by William Marshal, 1st Earl of Pembroke, in England.
- King Stefan Nemanja founds the Studenica Monastery in Serbia.

=== 1191 ===
==== By place ====
====== Byzantine Empire ======
- April 10 – King Richard I (the Lionheart) leaves Messina for Palestina, but a storm drives his fleet apart. Richard is forced to seek shelter at a Cretan port – from which he has a tempestuous passage to Rhodes, where he stays for ten days (from April 22 to May 1), recovering from his sea-sickness. After some searching, he discovers that the ship carrying his sister Joan of England and his new fiancée, Berengaria of Navarre, is anchored on the south coast of Cyprus, along with the wrecks of several other vessels, including Richard's treasure ship. The survivors of the wrecks have been taken prisoner by Isaac Komnenos, the self-styled emperor of Cyprus.
- May 8 – Richard I and his main fleet arrive in the Byzantine port of Limassol on Cyprus. He orders Isaac Komnenos to release the prisoners and his treasure. Isaac refuses, Richard embarks his forces, and takes Limassol. The Byzantine population and also the Latin merchants in their dislike of Isaac, show themselves friendly to the English invaders. Various leading Crusaders of the Holy Land arrive in Limassol, on May 11. Among them are King Guy of Lusignan of Jerusalem, Bohemond III of Antioch, Humphrey IV of Toron, and Leo I of Armenia. They declare their support for Richard in return that he supports them against their rival, Conrad of Montferrat.
- May 12 – Richard I marries the 19-year-old Berengaria of Navarre, daughter of King Sancho VI (the Wise), in the Chapel of St. George at Limassol. On the same day, she is crowned Queen of England, by John, bishop of Évreux in the presence of the archbishop of Bordeaux and many other clergy. After this, hearing that the daughter of Isaac Komnenos has taken refuge in Kyrenia Castle, Richard goes there with his army and receives her submission. On the orders of Richard, she is entrusted to the care of Joan and Berengaria. By the end of May, Richard, with his ships, sails around the island seizing all the Cypriot towns and ports on the coast.
- June 1 – A Crusader force led by Richard I defeats the Byzantine army near the village of Tremithus. Isaac Komnenos flees from the battlefield to Kantara. Richard captures Isaac's banner and hunts down the remnants of his army. At Nicosia Richard becomes ill; Guy of Lusignan in command of Richard's forces, marches on Kyrenia and captures it, taking the empress and her child prisoner. Isaac is taken before Richard (in chains of silver) and accepts an unconditional surrender. Richard places garrisons in the towns and castles, and appoints Richard de Camville as governor of Cyprus, jointly with Robert of Thornham.
- Autumn – Emperor Isaac II (Angelos) leads a punitive expedition against Grand Prince Stefan Nemanja. The Serbians are defeated at South Morava and retreat into the mountains. The Byzantine forces raid all lands around the bank of the river and burn down Stefan's court in Kuršumlija. Nemanja does not surrender and starts irregular warfare and Isaac negotiates a peace treaty. The Serbians are forced to give up a large part of their conquests, east of the Velika Morava, and recognize Byzantine rule. Isaac recognizes Nemanja as Grand Prince of Serbia.

====== Third Crusade ======
- February 13 – Muslim forces attack and succeed in breaking the siege lines around Acre. Though the Crusaders seal the breach, Saladin is able to replenish the garrison, by sending reinforcements. For the defenders, this is a temporary respite – and Saladin is having difficulty keeping his army together. Taqi al-Din, Saladin's nephew and one of his most effective commanders, fails to rejoin the siege. He divides his army for his own territorial ambitions in modern southeastern Turkey. Later in the spring, Taqi al-Din brings his forces to support the double-siege at Acre.
- April 20 – King Philip II (Augustus) arrives with a Genoese flotilla (six ships) filled with French nobles and his cousin Conrad of Montferrat at Acre. He begins the construction of seven immense stone-throwers – which are used to bombard the city, on May 30. One of the siege-machines is called by the French soldiers the "Evil Neighbour" and "God's Own Sling", and a grappling ladder is known as the "Cat". Meanwhile, the walls of Acre are pounded relentlessly. The Crusaders built earthworks, ramparts, and ditches to protect themselves against Muslim attacks.
- June 8 – Richard I arrives with 25 ships and a strong advanced guard at Acre. Upon reaching the city, he is greeted by Philip II and then sets up his camp. Richard becomes almost immediately seriously ill (called Arnaldia) and is confined to his tent. Nevertheless, he leaps into action and secretly initiates negotiations with Saladin. After having been refused a personal meeting, Richard sends a Moroccan prisoner to Saladin's camp as a sign of goodwill. Finally, Saladin accepts a three-day truce and allows his younger brother, Al-Adil, to negotiate with Richard.
- June 25 – The Crusader armies (now totaling some 25,000 men) who are deployed around Acre, implement a unified strategy of assault-based siege. Teams of sappers and, increasingly massive use of advanced and new stone-throwing catapults, brought by Philip II and Richard I, are used to hammer Acre's walls continuously with giant, accurately loosed stones. By late June, the assault is beginning to undermine the walls, which are tottering. Because of troop shortages and disease, the Muslim defenders can not any longer strengthen their walls.
- July 3 – The Crusaders change their strategy from battering the Acre fortifications to exploiting the breaches. After only the first day of these all-out attacks to seize the city, Saladin's governor sends a message stating he would surrender unless he is relieved. Both French sappers and English catapults manage to make significant breaches in the walls – but the assault is repulsed. Meanwhile, Richard I, still unable to walk due to illness, is carried on a regal stretcher near the front lines from where he picks off Muslim troops on the walls using his crossbow.
- July 12 – Siege of Acre: The Muslim garrison surrenders to Philip II, which includes an agreement to give up the 70 Muslim ships in the harbour without Saladin's consent, and by the time that he learned of this intention, the city has already capitulated. Conrad of Montferrat, who has negotiated the surrender, raises the banners of the Kingdom of Jerusalem, and of the Crusader leaders Philip II, Richard I, and Leopold V of Austria, on the city's walls and towers. The siege of Acre has taken nearly two years and has cost some 100,000 Christian casualties.
- July 31 – Philip II, accompanied by Conrad of Montferrat, departs to Tyre and returns to France. He leaves behind a French army (some 10,000 men) under the command of Hugh III, duke of Burgundy. Richard I is left in sole command of the Crusader forces in the Levant. Back in France, Philip schemes with Richard's brother, John of England, to dispossess Richard of his French lands while he is still away, but the intervention of John's mother, Queen Eleanor of Aquitaine, foils the plan. Meanwhile, Richard rebuilds and strengthens the walls of Acre.
- August 20 – Massacre of Ayyadieh: Richard I orders the execution of some 3,000 Muslim prisoners (captured after the siege of Acre), including women and children. The bound prisoners are mercilessly beheaded or cut down using swords and lances. A small group of Saladin's forces (located on Mount Tabor) tries to intervene in order to stop the massacre – but they are repelled. In response, Saladin executes all the Latin prisoners he himself has taken. In the Ayyubid Sultanate, Latin prisoners are tortured and murdered in reprisal for their infamy.
- August 22 – Richard I leads the Crusader forces (some 15,000 men) out of Acre and marches south along the coast, being closely supported by the Crusader fleet, carrying most of the supplies. Meanwhile, Saladin has given his son Al-Afdal orders to remain close to the Crusader rearguard under Hugh III, and strengthens the Muslim garrison both in Jerusalem and Ascalon with 20,000 men each. Richard advances at an unexpectedly slow pace and decides to make camp near Haifa – which Saladin has dismantled shortly before the fall of Acre.
- August 25–26 – Richard I leads a fast-moving advance-guard and establishes a strong position at the fortress near Merle before Saladin arrives. He then hurries back to support the rearguard, to regain contact with the Crusader forces. Richard reorganizes his marching column. The elite Templar and Hospitaller knights hold the van and rearguard, while Richard and a central mass of knights are screened on their landward left side by dense ranks of well-armoured infantry, whose panoply makes them almost immune to Muslim missile attacks.
- August 30 – Richard I advances in three divisions towards Caesarea, with the Crusader fleet accompanying him off-shore. The rearguard becomes engaged, and the French forces under Hugh III are nearly annihilated. Saladin has selected this part of the road for a major assault, but the Muslim attacks have little effect. The main effort to harass the Crusaders from a distance fails. Richard makes camp at the mouth of the Zarqa River, despite the intense heat, thirst, and the loss of many lives. Both armies rest and watch each other the rest of the day.
- September 2 – Richard I leads the Crusader army past Caesarea and is forced to turn inland, where he is separated from his supply ships. Saladin personally attacks the massed Crusader infantry, by bombarding them with arrows before charging their line with cavalry. During this brief but indecisive engagement, Richard is struck in the side by a crossbow bolt – though his armour absorbs much of the blow. By the end of the day, only 25 miles from Jaffa, Richard allows his men to rest (while recovering from his wounds) and re-assembles his forces.
- September 5 – Richard I dispatches envoys to request for peace talks and meets Al-Adil under a flag of truce. Saladin allows the Crusaders to forage in the Forrest of Arsuf. But Richard is in no mood for actual negotiations and demands nothing less than the cession of Palestina. Al-Adil at once breaks off the negotiations. Richard orders his forces to march quietly through the woods, and the Crusaders manage to reach the limits of the forest unhindered and unharmed. The Crusaders pitch their tents in the "Rochetaille" and rest for the night.
- September 7 – Battle of Arsuf: Richard I fights a pitched battle – while waiting for the ideal moment to mount a counterattack. However, the Hospitaller knights led by Garnier de Nablus break formation and launch a charge. Richard restores order in the turmoil and is forced to commit his entire army to support the attack. The Muslim forces flee in panic, but Saladin rallies them in time to defend his camp, and even to lead a counter-charge. By evening, Richard has defeated the Muslim forces, and Saladin retreats in good order to Ramallah.
- September 9–10 – Richard I and his Crusader forces march on to Jaffa and set about rebuilding its fortifications, which Saladin has destroyed by his scorched-earth policy. Mid-September, a large number of French nobles begin to resist – such as Hugh III. They argue about the refortification of Jaffa, instead of a direct strike inland on Jerusalem. Meanwhile, Saladin evacuates and demolishes most of the fortresses of southern Palestina.
- October 29 – Richard I marches with the Crusader forces onto the plains east of Jaffa and begins the slow, steady work of rebuilding a string of sites through which to advance on Jerusalem. During this period, the Third Crusade degenerates into a series of skirmishes. Richard uses diplomacy alongside military threats, hoping to bring Saladin to the point of submission before he has to make the siege of Jerusalem itself.
- December – Richard I and his Crusader forces occupy Latrun, while the advance-guard takes Bayt Nuba. He is warned by his nobles to take no further risks – due to winter conditions, and for being cut off if he presses on. Amongst those keenest on continuing are the French Crusaders under Hugh III. On December 25, Richard is now just 12 miles from Jerusalem.

====== Europe ======
- April 15 – Henry VI, son of the late Emperor Frederick I (Barbarossa), is crowned as Emperor of the Holy Roman Empire, together with his wife Constance by Pope Celestine III, on Easter Monday at Rome. Henry marches south and begins a campaign in Apulia. He besieges Naples, but encounters the resistance of Sicilian forces under Margaritus of Brindisi, who come to support the city's defense. Tusculum is destroyed by the rebel army of the Commune of Rome, on April 17.
- August – Margaritus of Brindisi defeats the Pisan fleet during the siege of Naples, and nearly destroys the late-arriving Genoese contingent. He keeps the harbour approaches open for supplies and reinforcements.
- Prince Yury Bogolyubsky leads a rebellion of disaffected Georgian nobleman against his ex-wife, Queen Tamara (the Great), but her forces win a two pitched battle at Tmogvi and Erusheti. Yury is captured, and Tamara allows him to withdraw to Constantinople.
- Henry VI is forced to raise the siege of Naples, due to an epidemic, and returns to Germany. Upon Henry's retreat, the Lombard cities that have surrendered to the Germans resubmit to Tancred of Lecce, king or usurper of Sicily. The populace of Salerno turn against Empress Constance during her visit to the city, and Margaritus of Brindisi delivers her to Tancred at Messina. Later, Constance is imprisoned at Castel dell'Ovo at Naples.
- The counties of Flanders and Hainaut (modern Belgium) are united under Count Baldwin VIII. Flanders, a feudal fiefdom of France, becomes an important, wealthy independent state of Western Europe.
- Siege of Silves – Almohad forces under Caliph Abu Yusuf Yaqub al-Mansur reconquer Silves in Portugal. In the same campaign, the Almohads take also Alcácer do Sal, while Palmela and Almada are sacked.
- Berthold V, duke of Zähringen, founds the city of Bern (modern Switzerland).
- King Canute VI leads a Danish Crusade to Finland.

====== England ======
- Spring – William de Longchamp, Chief Justiciar and regent, besieges Lincoln Castle accusing the castellan Gerard de Canville of corruption. In response, Prince John captures Nottingham and Tickhill castles from William. News of the dispute reaches Richard I, who sends Walter de Coutances, archbishop of Rouen, with orders to lead negotiations, for a peace between John and William.
- April – John and William de Longchamp meet at Winchester to discuss their differences. Several senior bishops are appointed as arbitrators. At the end of the meeting, both John and William agree to follow the recommendations. William is to return Lincoln Castle to Gerard de Canville and accepts limits to his powers. In return, John is to surrender Nottingham and Tickhill castles.
- September – Geoffrey, illegitimate son of the late King Henry II and half-brother to Richard I and John, lands secretly at Dover. He has been consecrated as the new archbishop of York while in Tours, and on his return is arrested by William de Longchamp. Citing the Winchester treaty, John seeks a meeting with William. Geoffrey is freed, William flees and heads to Dover Castle.
- October – William de Longchamp tries to hold the Tower of London against John's supporters for three days. He surrenders the Tower and escapes to continue his support for Richard I. On October 29, William is captured when disguised as a female merchant. John orders that he be expelled from the country.

====== Asia ======
- November 13 – Battle of Tarain: Sultan Muhammad of Ghor invades northern India, but is defeated by Rajput forces under Prithviraja III, ruler of Ajmer and Delhi. Prithviraj marches against the Ghurid army (some 100,000 men) with infantry, cavalry, and an elephant force. He repulses the Ghurid invasion near Taraori (some 70 miles of Delhi), Muhammad escapes the battlefield.
- The administration of the Taungoo region (modern Myanmar) is first recorded. King Narapatisithu appoints his son-in-law, Ananda Thuriya, as governor of Kanba Myint.
- King Jayavarman VII of the Khmer Empire sacks the capital of Champa (approximate date).

==== By topic ====
====== Religion ======
- March 20 – Pope Clement III dies at Rome after a pontificate of less than 3½ years. He is succeeded by the 85-year-old Celestine III as the 175th pope of the Catholic Church.
- The monks of Glastonbury Abbey dig up the remains of a large knight and a blonde woman, and announce they have discovered the tomb of King Arthur and Queen Guinevere.

=== 1192 ===
- January 7 – Venus occults Jupiter.
- April 28 – Conrad of Montferrat (Conrad I), King of Jerusalem, is assassinated in Tyre, only days after his title to the throne is confirmed by election. The killing is carried out by Hashshashin, later the basis of folk etymology for the English word "assassin."
- August 21 – Minamoto no Yoritomo is granted the title of shōgun, thereby officially establishing the first shogunate in the history of Japan.
- Margaritus of Brindisi becomes the first Count of Malta after capturing Constance, Holy Roman Empress in 1191.
- Second Battle of Tarain in India: The Ghurid forces of Mu'izz al-Din are victorious over Prithviraj Chauhan.
- The Lugouqiao (later the Marco Polo) Bridge is completed in Beijing.
- Constance, Holy Roman Empress is released by Tancred, King of Sicily under the pressure of Pope Celestine III in May, and returns to Germany in June.
- Prince Yaroslav Vladimirovich of Novgorod burns down Tartu and Otepää Castles, in Estonia.

=== 1193 ===
==== By place ====
====== Levant ======
- March 4 – Saladin (the Lion) dies of a fever at Damascus. The lands of the Ayyubid Dynasty of Syria and Egypt are split among his relatives. During his reign, he briefly unites the Muslim world, and drives the Crusaders out of Jerusalem to a narrow strip of coast. At the time of his death, Saladin has seventeen sons and one little daughter. Al-Afdal succeeds his father as ruler (emir) of Damascus, and inherits the headship of the Ayyubid family. His younger brother, the 22-year-old Al-Aziz, proclaims himself as independent sultan of Egypt. Al-Zahir receives Aleppo (with lands in northern Syria), and Turan-Shah receives Yemen. The other dominions and fiefs in the Oultrejordain (also called Lordship of Montréal) are divided between his sons and the two remaining brothers of Saladin.
- May – The Pisan colony at Tyre plots to seize the city, and hand it over to Guy of Lusignan – the ruler of Cyprus. King Henry I of Jerusalem arrests the ringleaders, and orders that the colony be reduced to only 30 people. The Pisans retaliate, by raiding the coastal villages between Tyre and Acre.

====== Europe ======
- February 14 – King Richard I (the Lionheart), previously imprisoned on his return from the Third Crusade by Leopold V (the Virtuous), duke of Austria is handed over to Emperor Henry VI, and moved to Trifels Castle.
- King Philip II (Augustus) marries Ingeborg of Denmark, daughter of King Valdemar I (the Great). After the marriage, Philip changes his mind, wishes to obtain a separation, and attempts to send her back to Denmark.
- King Tancred of Sicily arranges a marriage between his son Roger III and the 12-year-old Irene Angelina, daughter of the Byzantine emperor Isaac II (Angelos). Roger suddenly dies on December 24.

====== Asia ======
- Ghurid forces under Qutb al-Din Aibak capture Delhi. General Muhammad bin Bakhtiyar Khilji sacks and burns the ancient city of Nalanda, India's greatest Buddhist seat of learning, and the university of Vikramashila.

=== 1194 ===
==== By place ====
====== England ======
- February 4 – King Richard I of England ("the Lionheart") is ransomed for an amount of 150,000 marks (demanded by Emperor Henry VI), raised by his mother Eleanor of Aquitaine – who travels to Austria to gain his release. Henry will never receive the full amount he demanded.
- March – Richard returns to England, and remains for only a few weeks before returning to the Continent. He leaves the administration of England in the hands of Hubert Walter, archbishop of Canterbury, who accompanied Richard on the Third Crusade and led his army back to England. He levied the taxes to pay the king's ransom and put down a plot against Richard by his younger brother John.
- March 12–28 – Richard I besieges Nottingham Castle (occupied by supporters of John) – which falls after a siege of several days. Richard is aided by English troops under Ranulf de Blondeville and David of Scotland.
- April 17 – Richard I is crowned for the second time, at Winchester, to underline his rightful position as monarch. During the coronation, he wears a golden crown and is followed by notables from the Church and State.
- May – Richard I calls for a council in Nottingham to raise funds for an expedition to France. On May 12, he leaves for Normandy with a large fleet (some 300 ships), to reclaim lands lost to King Philip II of France ("Augustus").
- Ordinance of the Jewry: Beginning of strict records of financial transactions by Jews liable to taxation. The Exchequer of the Jews at Westminster regulates the taxes and the law-cases (also in Wales).

====== Europe ======
- Spring – Casimir II the Just, High Duke of Poland, organizes an expedition against the Baltic Yotvingians. The expedition ends with full success, and Casimir has a triumphant return in Kraków. On May 5, after a banquet, which is held to celebrate his return, Casimir dies unexpectedly (possibly poisoned). He is succeeded by his eldest surviving son Leszek the White, who has to face strong opposition from his uncle Mieszko III the Old.
- July 3 – Battle of Fréteval: English forces under Richard I defeat Philip II, and capture the French baggage train. It contains the royal archives – including a list of the treasure of the French kingdom (transported in a wagon behind the army). Philip withdraws across the River Epte, where the bridge collapses under the weight of the retreating army. Meanwhile, Richard sacks the town of Évreux, which is a possession of Philip's ally, John.
- November 20 – Emperor Henry VI enforces the inheritance claims by his wife, Constance I, against her illegitimate nephew, King Tancred of Lecce (who died on February 20). He takes Palermo (supported by the navy of Pisa and Genoa) and gains control of all of Sicily – ending Norman rule in Italy after 90 years.
- December 25 – Henry VI deposes the 8-year-old William III (son of Tancred de Lecce) and is crowned king of Sicily. The next day, Constance I, who stays in the town of Iesi, gives birth to Frederick II, the future emperor of the Holy Roman Empire.

====== Levant ======
- October – Leo I ("Lord of the Mountains"), ruler of Armenian Cilicia, invites Bohemond III of Antioch to Bagras, ostensibly to resolve their differences. Upon Bohemond's arrival, Leon captures him and his family, and takes them to the capital of Sis.

====== Seljuk Empire ======
- March 10 – Sultan Toghrul III is defeated and killed in battle with Ala ad-Din Tekish, near Rey in Persia – ending the Seljuq dynasty of Hamedan. The Seljuk Empire passes to the Khwarazmian dynasty.

====== China ======
- July 24 – Emperor Guangzong of Song (or Zhao Dun) is forced to abdicate the throne to his 25-year-old son Ningzong, who succeeds him as ruler of the Song dynasty. During his reign, he will be dominated by his prime-minister Han Tuozhou (or Han T'o-Chou).
- The Yellow River experiences a major course change, taking over the Huai River drainage system for the next 700 years.

====== Mesoamerica ======
- Hunac Ceel drives the Itza people out of Chichen Itza, forcing them to start the Itza Kingdom on Lake Petén Itzá (modern Guatemala).

==== By topic ====
====== Commerce ======
- May 2 – Richard I grants Portsmouth market-town status with a royal charter. He orders the construction of docks on The Solent – having seen that the harbour is a perfect base for trade and the English fleet.

====== Economy and society ======
- Hubert Walter, vice-regent in the absence of Richard I, institutes the office of coroner to keep records of crown pleas. He also presides over the feudal judgment of John and makes an inquiry into land tenure.

====== Religion ======
- May 15 – Michael the Syrian reconsecrates the Mor Bar Sauma Monastery, which he reconstructed after its destruction by a fire. The monastery stays a center of the Syriac Orthodox Church until the end of the thirteenth century.
- July 10 – A fire devastates Chartres Cathedral. Only the crypt, the towers, and the new facade survives. Funds are collected from nobles, as well as small donations from ordinary people, to start the rebuilding.
- The Carthusian monastery of Scala Dei is founded in the region of Montsant in Catalonia.

=== 1195 ===
- June 1 – Battle of Shamkor: Georgians defeat the Ildenizids of Azerbaijan.
- July 18 – Battle of Alarcos: Almohad ruler Abu Yusuf Ya'qub al-Mansur decisively defeats Castilian King Alfonso VIII.
- The Priory of St Mary's is founded in Bushmead.
- Alexius III Angelus overthrows Isaac II, and becomes Byzantine Emperor.

=== 1196 ===
==== By place ====
====== Byzantine Empire ======
- December – Emperor Alexios III Angelos is threatened by Emperor Henry VI, Holy Roman Emperor, who demands 5,000 pounds of gold or the Byzantines will face an invasion, this due to a convoluted system of dynastic claims of Henry gaining control of Alexios' daughter Irene Doukaina. The amount is negotiated down to 1,600 pounds of gold – with Alexios plundering the imperial tombs within the Church of the Holy Apostles – as well as levying a heavy and unpopular tax, known as the Alamanikon (or German Tax).

====== Europe ======
- Spring – Henry VI persuades a diet at Würzburg. He manages to convince the majority of the German nobles and clergy to recognize his 2-year-old son, Frederick II, as king of the Romans and heir to the imperial throne. However, Archbishop Adolf of Cologne thwarts the will of the diet and arouses the resistance of several Saxon and Thuringian nobles against Henry, who realizes that he is unable to establish a hereditary monarchy (his Erbreichsplan) in the Holy Roman Empire without resistance.
- April 23 – Béla III of Hungary dies after a 23-year reign in which he has supported the former Byzantine emperor Isaac II Angelos against the invading Bulgarians. Having made the Hungarian court one of the most brilliant in Europe and made his hereditary monarchy. Béla is succeeded by his 22-year-old son Emeric as ruler of Hungary, Croatia and Dalmatia (until 1204).
- April 25 – King Alfonso II of Aragon ("the Chaste") dies after a 32-year reign at Perpignan. He leaves a will that divides his realm (Aragon loses Provence) and is succeeded by his 21-year-old son Peter II (the Catholic).
- Battle of Serres: Bulgarian forces under Tsar Ivan Asen I defeat the Byzantine army near Serres. During the winter Ivan continues his campaign in Central Macedonia and captures many Byzantine fortresses.
- Ivan Asen I is stabbed to death by Ivanko, a Bulgarian boyar (aristocrat), who is accused of having an affair with Ivan's wife's sister. He is succeeded by his brother Kaloyan as co-ruler of the Bulgarian Empire.

====== England ======
- Spring – William Fitz Osbert, a rebel leader, leads an uprising of the poor against the rich in London. He gathers over 52,000 supporters, stocks of weapons are cached throughout the city by breaking into the houses of the rich. Finally, the riots are suppressed and William is hanged, drawn and quartered by orders of Hubert Walter, archbishop of Canterbury.
- England is struck by pestilence and a resulting famine.

====== Asia ======
- Ch'oe Ch'ung-hŏn, a Korean general, massacres his rivals and restores unity. After a coup d'état, he takes full power and becomes prime-minister of the Korean state Goryeo (until 1219).

=== 1197 ===
==== By place ====
====== Europe ======
- Spring – Emperor Henry VI travels to Italy to persuade Pope Celestine III to crown his infant son Frederick II, who has been elected "King of the Romans" at Frankfurt.
- King Richard I of England (the Lionheart) has Château Gaillard (Normandy) built on the Seine River as he fights to restore Angevin power in northern France (approximate date).
- Summer – Henry VI takes cruel measures to put down Jordan Lupin's insurrection in Sicily and southern Italy, which has been provoked by the oppression of his German officials.
- June/July – German crusaders launch a raid on Silves.
- September 28 – Henry VI dies of malaria at Messina (also possibly poisoned), while preparing an expedition against the Byzantine usurper Alexios III Angelos.
- Autumn – A German throne dispute begins upon the sudden death of Henry VI. Henry's brother, Philip of Swabia, takes over the family lands and claims his inheritance.
- Autumn – A brothers' quarrel breaks out between Emeric, King of Hungary and his younger brother Duke Andrew. After a brief skirmish, Emeric is forced to cede Croatia and Dalmatia to Andrew, who begins to administer the provinces as a de facto sovereign monarch.
- Winter – Duke Ottokar I forces his brother, Vladislaus III, to abandon Bohemia. Ottokar restores power and Vladislaus accepts the margravial title of Moravia.
- Saracen pirates, from the Balearic Islands, raid the city of Toulon in Provence, and the Benedictine monastery of Saint Honorat, on the Lérins Islands.
- Northern Crusades: Danish forces led by King Canute VI raid the area of present-day Estonia.
- Civil war era in Norway: conflict between king Sverre of Norway and the party of Bagler.

====== Wales ======
- April 28 – Rhys ap Gruffydd, a Welsh prince, dies and is succeeded by his eldest son Gruffydd ap Rhys II. With the help of Gwenwynwyn, his brother Maelgwn ap Rhys invades southern Wales.
- Summer – Gruffydd ap Rhys II is captured and handed over to Gwenwynwyn, who transfers him to the English. Gruffydd is imprisoned at Corfe Castle and Maelgwn ap Rhys claims the throne.

====== Levant ======
- September 10 – Henry II, Count of Champagne, king of Jerusalem, dies from falling out a first-floor window at his palace in Acre. His widow, Isabella I, becomes regent while the kingdom is thrown into consternation.
- September 22 – About 16,000 German crusaders reach Acre, starting the crusade of 1197. Emperor Henry VI, who planned to join the forces later on, was forced to stay behind in Sicily due to illness. On September 28 he dies at Messina. Meanwhile the crusaders manage to reconquer Sidon and Beirut but return to Germany after receiving the news of the emperor's death.

====== Asia ======
- Genghis Khan (or Temüjin), with help from the Keraites, defeats the Jurchens of the Jin dynasty. The Jin bestow Genghis' blood brother Toghrul with the honorable title of Ong Khan, and Genghis receives the lesser title of j'aut quri. During the winter, Toghrul returns and re-establishes himself as leader of the Keraites.

==== By topic ====
====== Religion ======
- Arbroath Abbey located in the Scottish town of Arbroath, is consecrated and dedicated to St. Thomas Becket.

=== 1198 ===
==== By place ====
====== Europe ======
- March 8 – Philip of Swabia, son of the late Emperor Frederick I, is elected "King of Germany" by his supporters at Mühlhausen in Thuringia. Archbishop Adolf of Cologne elects Otto of Brunswick, son of Henry the Lion, as Philip's rival. Otto IV is crowned as King of the Romans in Aachen by supporters of the House of Welf. Philip's coronation does not take place until September 8, at Mainz.
- May 17 – Frederick II, infant son of the late Emperor Henry VI, is crowned King of Sicily. His mother, Queen Constance I becomes regent, while she surrounds herself with local advisors. On November 27, Constance dies in the royal palace at Palermo. She is succeeded by the new pope, Innocent III, who becomes Frederick's guardian and mentor.

====== England ======
- John of England captures a party of 18 French knights and many men-at-arms, in the ongoing conflict against France. His brother, King Richard I (the Lionheart) introduces a new Great Seal – in an attempt to keep the war against France funded. The government proclaims that charters previously struck with the old seal are no longer valid and must be renewed with a fresh payment. The office of Lord Warden of the Stannaries is also introduced, to tax the produce of tin mines in Cornwall and Devon.
- September 27 – Battle of Gisors: Richard I defeats the French forces led by Philip II (Augustus) at Courcelles-lès-Gisors, in Picardy. Richard captures three castles on the border of the Vexin. The French troops, many of them mounted, crowd the bridge leading into Gisors Castle but it collapses beneath them. The French king is among those who plunge into the water in his armor. Many French knights drown, but Philip is pulled to safety.

====== Levant ======
- Spring – Amalric I, ruler of Cyprus, marries Princess Isabella I, daughter of the late King Amalric I. A few days later they are crowned as King and Queen of Jerusalem at Acre. On July 1, Amalric signs a truce with Al-Adil I, sultan of Egypt and Syria, securing the Crusader possessions from Acre to as far as Antioch.

====== Asia ======
- February 18 – Emperor Go-Toba (or Toba the Second) abdicates the throne in favor of his two-year-old son Tsuchimikado, after a 14-year reign.
- Emperor Ningzong of Song bans the practice of Neo-Confucianism.

==== By topic ====
====== Literature ======
- December 11 – Averroes (or Ibn Rushd), Arab polymath and physician, dies. He is the author of more than 100 books, for which he is known in the western world as The Commentator and Father of Rationalism.

====== Religion ======
- January 8 – Pope Celestine III dies at Rome, after a pontificate of nearly 7 years. He is succeeded by Innocent III, as the 176th pope of the Catholic Church. Shortly after he lays an interdict on Laon, in an attempt to create independent beliefs there. This will be followed by interdicts against France in 1199, and Normandy in 1203.
- Innocent III excommunicates Philip II for repudiating his marriage to Ingeborg of Denmark (see 1193), to whom he took an almost instant dislike, but public opinion forces Philip to effect a reconciliation with the pope.

=== 1199 ===
==== By place ====
====== Europe ======
- January 13 – A short-lived truce is declared, between the Kings Richard I (the Lionheart) and Philip II (Augustus). Two of Europe's most powerful rulers meet on the banks of the Seine River, while shouting terms to one another. With a peace secured, Richard is able to refocus on bringing internal order to the south of the Angevin Empire.
- March 26 – Richard I besieges the unarmed castle of Châlus-Chabrol, and is shot in the left shoulder with a crossbow, by the French boy Pierre Basile. The war between the kingdoms of England and France has become so brutal, that Hugh of Lincoln is warned that "nothing now is safe, neither the city to dwell in nor the highway for travel".
- April 6 – Richard I dies from gangrene, caused by his crossbow wound. His younger brother, John (Lackland), becomes King of England. Richard's jewels are left to his nephew, Otto IV, King of the Romans. Mercadier, a mercenary captain and Richard's second in command, has Pierre Basile flayed alive and hanged.
- Roman Mstislavich (the Great), Grand Prince of Vladimir-Volhynia, unites his realm with its westerly neighbor Galicia (after the death of Vladimir II). He makes the Kingdom of Galicia-Volhynia more powerful than Kiev.
- Summer – Philip II renews his war against England, supporting the rival claim to the English throne of John's 12-year-old nephew Arthur I, duke of Brittany.
- Summer – After uncovering a plot against him, Emeric, King of Hungary defeats his brother Duke Andrew in a battle, forcing him into exile in Austria. Thereafter, border clashes occurs between Hungary and Austria.

====== Britain ======
- May 26 – John returns to London and chooses people to help him to rule the kingdom. He appoints Archbishop Hubert Walter as his advisor and chancellor. Geoffrey Fitz Peter is chosen as Chief Justiciar and William (the Marshal) becomes Marshal of John's household. On May 27, John is crowned as king of England at Westminster Abbey.
- Summer – King William the Lion of Scotland supports John's claim to the English throne, in exchange for ownership of the northern territories (including Northumberland and Cumberland).

====== Africa ======
- January 23 – Caliph Abu Yusuf Yaqub al-Mansur dies at Marrakesh after a 15-year reign in which he has defeated the Castilian forces of King Alfonso VIII (the noble) (see 1195) and other Christian enemies in Al-Andalus. He is succeeded by his son Muhammad al-Nasir as ruler of the Almohad Caliphate (until 1213).

====== Japan ======
- February 9 – Minamoto no Yoritomo, Japanese shogun, dies at Kamakura after a 7-year reign in which he has established the Kamakura Shogunate (see 1192). He is succeeded by his 16-year-old son Minamoto no Yoriie, his grandfather Hōjō Tokimasa proclaims himself regent for Yoriie (until 1202).

==== By topic ====
====== Religion ======
- Summer – Pope Innocent III calls for a fourth Crusade at Rome. Due to the preaching of Fulk of Neuilly, an army is organized at a tournament held at Ecry-sur-Aisne by Theobald III, count of Champagne, on November 28.
- St. Laurence's Church, Ludlow, in England is rebuilt.

== Births ==
1190

- July 24 – Yelü Chucai, Chinese statesman (d. 1244)
- December 30 – Ibn Abi'l-Hadid, Arab scholar (d. 1258)
- Benedetto Sinigardi, Italian Franciscan friar (d. 1282)
- Gerhard II of Lippe, German archbishop (d. 1258)
- Heinrich I von Müllenark, German archbishop (d. 1238)
- Helvis of Cyprus, princess of Antioch (approximate date)
- Henry II of Bar, French nobleman and knight (d. 1239)
- Ida of Nivelles, Belgian Cistercian nun and mystic (d. 1231)
- John (the Old), French nobleman and knight (d. 1267)
- Klement of Ruszcza, Polish nobleman and knight (d. 1256)
- Luce de Gast, English nobleman (approximate date)
- Maria of Brabant, Holy Roman Empress (d. 1260)
- Peter González (or Pedro), Castilian priest (d. 1246)
- Pietro della Vigna, Italian jurist and diplomat (d. 1249)
- Richer of Senones, French monk and chronicler (d. 1266)
- Roger I of Fézensaguet, French nobleman (d. 1245)
- Sayf al-Din al-Bakharzi, Persian theologian (d. 1261)
- Sorghaghtani Beki, mother of Kublai Khan (d. 1252)
- Tbeli Abuserisdze, Georgian scholar and writer (d. 1240)
- Theodora Angelina, Byzantine noblewoman (d. 1246)
- Vincent of Beauvais, French encyclopedist (d. 1264)
- William Marshal, English nobleman and knight (d. 1231)
- William Perault, French preacher and writer (d. 1271)
- Władysław Odonic, duke of Greater Poland (d. 1239)
- Yuan Haowen, Chinese politician and poet (d. 1257)
- Zulema L'Astròloga, Moorish astronomer (approximate date)

1191

- February 8 – Yaroslav II, Grand Prince of Vladimir (d. 1246)
- Geoffrey de Mandeville, English nobleman (approximate date)
- George IV (or Lasha Giorgi), king of Georgia (d. 1223)
- Joanna of Hohenstaufen, countess of Burgundy (d. 1205)
- Mafalda of Castile, Spanish princess (infanta) (d. 1204)
- Richard Marshal, Norman nobleman and knight (d. 1234)
- Stephen Devereux, Norman nobleman (approximate date)
- Theobald I, German nobleman (House of Lorraine) (d. 1220)
- Tolui, Mongol general and son of Genghis Khan (d. 1232)
- Yan Yu, Chinese poetry theorist and writer (d. 1241)

1192

- September 17 – Minamoto no Sanetomo, Japanese shōgun (d. 1219)
- Queen Maria of Jerusalem (d. 1212)
- King Stefan Radoslav of Serbia (d. 1234)
- Saint Syed Jalaluddin Bukhari of Uch Sharif (d. 1291)

1193

- July 28 – Kujō Michiie, Japanese nobleman (d. 1252)
- Alice of Champagne, queen of Cyprus (d. 1246)
- Altheides, Cypriot philosopher and writer (d. 1262)
- Beatrice II, French countess palatine (d. 1231)
- Henri de Dreux, French archbishop (d. 1240)
- Frederick of Isenberg, German nobleman (d. 1226)
- Giovanni da Penna, Italian Franciscan priest (d. 1271)
- John III (Doukas Vatatzes), emperor of Nicaea (d. 1254)
- John Angelos (Good John), Byzantine prince (d. 1253)
- John Devereux, Norman nobleman (approximate date)
- Juliana of Liège, Belgian nun and mystic (d. 1258)
- Margaret of Scotland, English noblewoman (d. 1259)
- Sayyed ibn Tawus, Arab jurist and theologian (d. 1266)
- William de Ferrers, English nobleman (d. 1254)

1194

- April 25 – Ezzelino III, Italian nobleman and knight (d. 1259)
- July 16 – Clare of Assisi, Italian nun and saint (d. 1253)
- November 30 – Andrea Caccioli, Italian priest (d. 1254)
- December 26 – Frederick II, Holy Roman Emperor (d. 1250)
- Jacob Anatoli, French Jewish translator and writer (d. 1256)
- Jacopo Contarini, doge of Venice (House of Contarini) (d. 1280)
- Lý Huệ Tông, Vietnamese emperor (Lý dynasty) (d. 1226)
- Majd al-Din Taymiyyah, Seljuk judge and theologian (d. 1255)
- Margaret, marchioness of Namur (House of Vianden) (d. 1270)
- Maurice FitzGerald, Norman nobleman and justiciar (d. 1257)
- Moses ben Nahman, Spanish rabbi and philosopher (d. 1270)
- Otto I, Dutch nobleman and bishop (House of Gelre) (d. 1215)
- Richard Mór de Burgh, Norman nobleman (approximate date)
- Rusudan, queen of Georgia (House of Bagrationi) (d. 1245)
- Saionji Saneuji, Japanese nobleman and waka poet (d. 1269)

1195

- August 15 – Anthony of Padua, Portuguese preacher and saint (d. 1231)
- Princess Shōshi of Japan (d. 1211)
- Roger de Quincy, 2nd Earl of Winchester (d. 1265)

1196

- January 3 – Tsuchimikado, emperor of Japan (d. 1231)
- March 27 – Sviatoslav III, Kievan Grand Prince (d. 1252)
- Abul Hasan ash-Shadhili, Almohad scholar (d. 1258)
- Alberico II, Italian troubadour and statesman (d. 1260)
- Aurembiaix, Spanish countess (House of Urgell) (d. 1231)
- Prince Dōjonyūdō, Japanese nobleman and waka poet (d. 1249)
- Henry II the Pious, High Duke of Poland (d. 1241)
- Henry VI, Count Palatine of the Rhine ("the Younger"), German nobleman (d. 1214)
- Pedro Alfonso de León, Spanish nobleman (d. 1226)
- William II of Dampierre, French nobleman (d. 1231)

1197

- October 22 – Juntoku, emperor of Japan (d. 1242)
- Amadeus IV, count of Savoy (House of Savoy) (d. 1253)
- Dharmasvamin, Tibetan monk and pilgrim (d. 1264)
- Ibn al-Baitar, Moorish botanist and pharmacist (d. 1248)
- John de Braose (Tadody), English nobleman (or 1198)
- Naratheinga Uzana, Burmese prince and regent (d. 1235)
- Nicola Paglia, Italian priest and preacher (d. 1256)
- Nikephoros Blemmydes, Byzantine theologian (d. 1272)
- Oberto Pallavicino, Italian nobleman (signore) (d. 1269)
- Raymond VII, French nobleman and knight (d. 1249)
- Richard of Chichester, English bishop of Chichester (d. 1253)
- William de Braose, English nobleman (d. 1230)

1198

- May 4 – Kyaswa, ruler of the Pagan Empire (d. 1251)
- July 11 – Hōjō Shigetoki, Japanese samurai (d. 1261)
- August 24 – Alexander II, king of Scotland (d. 1249)
- September 25 – Ai Zong, Chinese emperor (d. 1234)
- Baldwin III, Flemish nobleman and knight (d. 1244)
- Beatrice of Savoy, countess of Provence (d. 1266)
- Beatrice of Swabia, Holy Roman Empress (d. 1212)
- Hugh I of Châtillon, French nobleman and knight (d. 1248)
- Branca of Portugal, Portuguese princess (d. 1240)
- Fujiwara no Tameie, Japanese waka poet (d. 1275)
- Humbert V de Beaujeu, French constable (d. 1250)
- Jalaluddin Surkh-Posh Bukhari, Arab missionary (d. 1292)
- John de Braose (Tadody), English nobleman (d. 1232)
- Konrad the Curly, Polish nobleman (approximate date)
- Koun Ejō, Japanese Sōtō Zen monk and priest (d. 1280)
- Marie of France, French princess and duchess (d. 1224)
- Minamoto no Ichiman, Japanese nobleman (d. 1203)
- Ordoño Álvarez, Spanish abbot and cardinal (d. 1285)
- Ramon Berenguer IV, Spanish nobleman (d. 1245)
- Siraj al-Din Urmavi, Ayyubid philosopher (d. 1283)
- Sybilla of Lusignan, queen of Lesser Armenia (d. 1230)

1199

- April 17 – Marie of Ponthieu, French noblewoman (d. 1250)
- Aisha Al-Manoubya, Almohad female Sufi mystic (d. 1267)
- Al-Mansur al-Hasan, Yemeni imam and politician (d. 1271)
- Bohemond V, prince of Antioch (House of Poitiers) (d. 1252)
- Ferdinand III (the Saint), king of Castile and León (d. 1252)
- Guttorm of Norway (Sigurdsson), king of Norway (d. 1204)
- Ibn al-Abbar, Andalusian biographer and historian (d. 1260)
- Isobel of Huntingdon, daughter of David of Scotland (d. 1252)
- Jalal al-Din Mangburni, Khwarezmid ruler (shah) (d. 1231)
- Joan of Constantinople, Flemish noblewoman (d. 1244)
- Sturla Sighvatsson, Icelandic chieftain (or goði) (d. 1238)
- Thomas II, Flemish nobleman (House of Savoy) (d. 1259)

== Deaths ==
1190

- February 18 – Otto II (the Rich), margrave of Meissen (b. 1125)
- March 15 – Isabella of Hainault, wife of Philip II (Augustus) (b. 1170)
- March 23 – Saigyō Hōshi, Japanese monk, poet and writer (b. 1118)
- June 10 – Frederick I (Barbarossa), Holy Roman Emperor (b. 1122)
- July 25 – Sibylla (or Sibylle), queen of Jerusalem (b. 1160)
- July 29 – Maud of Gloucester (or Matilda), English countess
- August 1 – Floris III, Dutch nobleman and knight (b. 1141)
- August 16 – Dedi III (the Fat), German nobleman (b. 1130)
- August 21 – Godfrey III, count of Louvain (House of Reginar)
- September 13 – Herman IV, German nobleman (b. 1135)
- September 20 – Adelog of Hildesheim, German bishop
- October 16 – Louis III (the Mild), German nobleman
- November 3 – Diepold of Berg, German bishop (b. 1140)
- November 19 – Baldwin of Forde, English archbishop
- November 21 – Děpolt II (or Diepold), German nobleman
- Bernard II de Balliol, Norman nobleman (approximate date)
- Chrétien de Troyes, French poet, trouvère and writer
- Geoffrey IV (the Younger), French nobleman and knight
- Judah ben Saul ibn Tibbon, Arab-Jewish translator (or 1191)
- Maria Komnene, queen of Hungary and Croatia (b. 1144)
- Ramon I de Montcada, Catalan nobleman (b. 1150)
- Ranulf de Glanvill, English Chief Justiciar and writer
- Robert de Beaumont (White-Hands), English nobleman
- Walkelin de Derby (de Ferrers), Norman nobleman
- Walter de Clifford (or FitzRichard), English nobleman

1191

- January 14 – Berno, German missionary and bishop
- January 20
  - Frederick VI, son of Frederick I (Barbarossa) (b. 1167)
  - Theobald V (the Good), French nobleman (b. 1130)
- February 8 – Erard II, French nobleman (House of Brienne)
- February 24 – John I, French nobleman (House of Alençon)
- March 20 – Clement III, pope of the Catholic Church (b. 1130)
- April 1 – Engelbert II, German nobleman (House of Gorizia)
- June 10 – Barisone II of Torres, Sardinian ruler of Logudoro
- June 29 – William le Vavasour, English nobleman (b. 1131)
- July 3 – Albéric Clément, Marshal of France (b. 1165)
- July 7 – Judith of Hohenstaufen, German noblewoman
- August 1 – Philip of Alsace, Flemish nobleman (b. 1143)
- August 5 – Rudolf of Zähringen, archbishop of Mainz
- August 13 – Philip I, archbishop of Cologne (b. 1130)
- September 7 – James of Avesnes, French nobleman
- September 9 – Conrad II, duke of Bohemia (b. 1136)
- September 10 – Ralph de Warneville, Norman bishop
- October 15 – Raoul I (the Red), French nobleman
- December 15 – Welf VI, margrave of Tuscany (b. 1115)
- December 26 – Reginald Fitz Jocelin, English bishop
- Adam de Senlis, French Benedictine monk and abbot
- Agnes of Loon, German duchess and regent (b. 1150)
- Galeran V de Beaumont, French nobleman and knight
- Geoffroy III de Pons, French nobleman and knight
- Hugh VI (the Clever), French nobleman and knight
- John I of Ponthieu, Norman nobleman and knight
- Maurice of Carnoet, French Cistercian abbot (b. 1117)
- Mór Ní Tuathail, queen of Leinster (approximate date)
- Richard de Camville, English nobleman and governor
- Rupert III, German nobleman (House of Nassau)
- Shun'e (or Tayū no Kimi), Japanese (waka) poet
- Sohrevardi, Persian scholar and philosopher (b. 1154)
- Walter Ophamil (or Offamil), Sicilian archbishop
- William V (the Old), Italian nobleman and knight
- William Fitzstephen, English cleric and administrator

1192

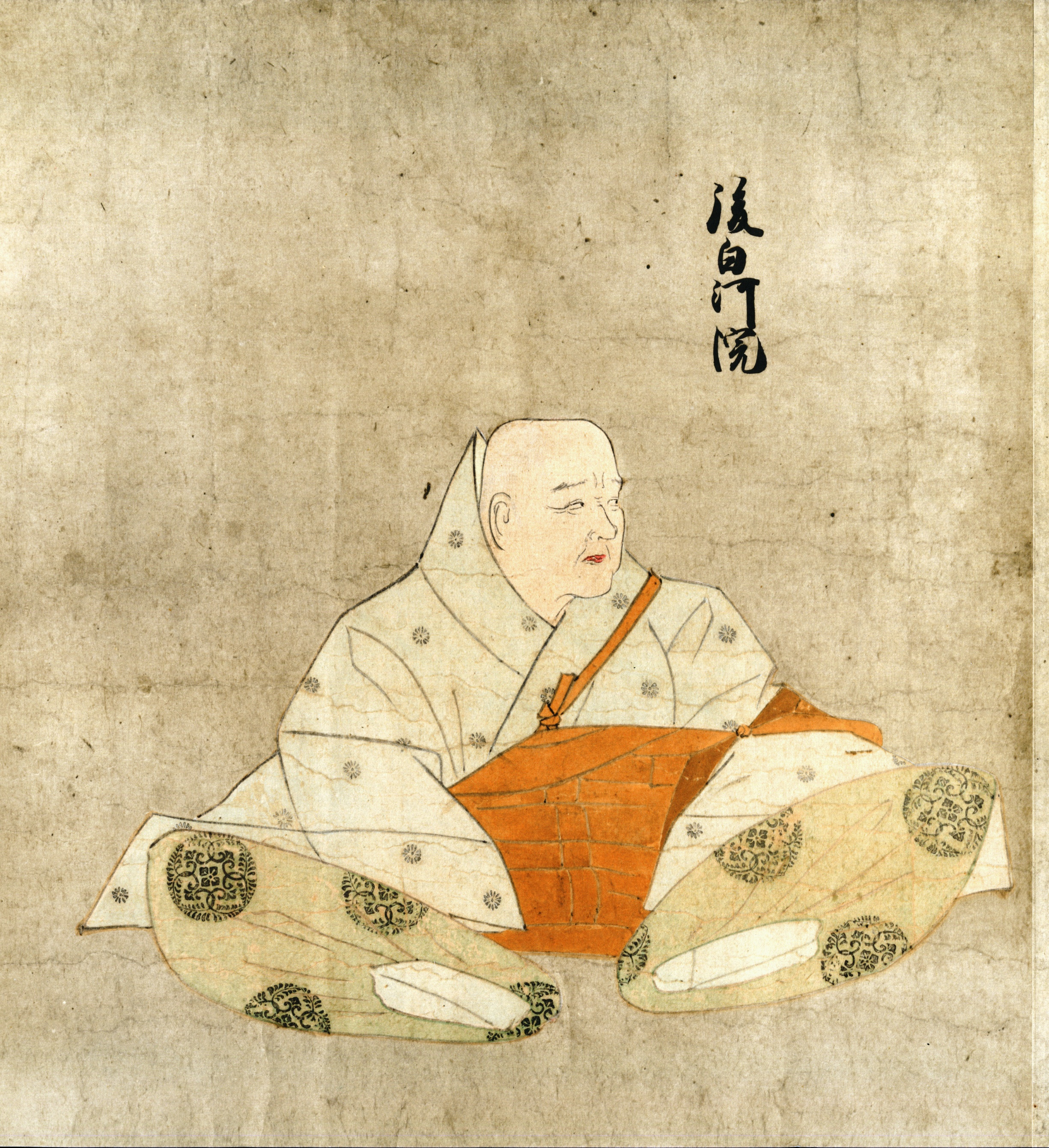
Emperor Go-Shirakawa

- April 26 – Emperor Go-Shirakawa of Japan (b. 1127)
- April 28 – Conrad of Montferrat, King of Jerusalem (b. mid-1140s)
- May 8 – Duke Ottokar IV, Duke of Styria (b. 1163)
- August 25 – Hugh III, Duke of Burgundy (b. 1142)
- Saint Margaret of England, English saint
- Ikhtiyar al-Din Hasan ibn Ghafras, vizier of the Sultanate of Rum
- Kilij Arslan II, Sultan of Rum
- Rashid ad-Din Sinan, the "Old Man of the Mountain", leader of the Hashashin sect (b. 1132/1135)
- Prithviraj Chauhan, King of the Chauhan Dynasty (b. 1177)

1193

- March 4 – Saladin (the Lion), sultan of Egypt and Syria (b. 1137)
- June 13 – Pedro de Artajona, Spanish nobleman and bishop
- June 27 – Robert FitzRalph, English archdeacon and bishop
- August 2 – Mieszko the Younger, duke of Kalisz (House of Piast)
- September 14 – Minamoto no Noriyori, Japanese general (b. 1150)
- September 23 – Robert IV, French nobleman and Grand Master
- December 23 – Thorlak Thorhallsson, Icelandic bishop (b. 1133)
- December 24 – Roger III, king of Sicily (House of Hauteville)
- Balian of Ibelin (the Younger), French nobleman and knight
- Derbforgaill ingen Maeleachlainn (or Derval), Irish princess
- Düsum Khyenpa, Tibetan spiritual leader (karmapa) (b. 1110)
- Fan Chengda, Chinese politician and geographer (b. 1126)
- Ren Zong, Chinese emperor of the Western Xia (b. 1124)
- Walter de Berkeley, Scottish nobleman (approximate date)

1194

- February 20 – Tancred of Lecce, king of Sicily (b. 1138)
- March 19 – Toghrul III, sultan of the Seljuk Empire
- April 3
  - Bård Guttormsson, Norwegian nobleman
  - Sigurd Magnusson, Norwegian nobleman
- April 20 – Odon of Poznań, duke of Greater Poland
- May 5 – Casimir II the Just, duke of Lesser Poland
- June 27 – Sancho VI ("the Wise"), king of Navarre (b. 1132)
- June 28 – Xiao Zong, Chinese emperor (Song dynasty) (b. 1127)
- July 18 – Guy of Lusignan, king of Jerusalem (b. 1150)
- July 27 – Sviatoslav III, Kievan Grand Prince (b. 1126)
- November 15 – Margaret I, countess of Flanders
- December 26 – Aubrey de Vere, 1st Earl of Oxford
- December 31 – Leopold V, duke of Austria (b. 1157)
- Basil Vatatzes, Byzantine governor and general

1195

- March 3 – Hugh de Puiset, bishop of Durham (b. c. 1125)
- August 6 – Henry the Lion, Duke of Saxony and Bavaria (b. 1129)
- October 13 – Gualdim Pais, Great Master of the Templars in Portugal (b. 1118)
- December 17 – Baldwin V, Count of Hainaut (b. 1150)
- Ascelina, French nun and mystic (b. 1121)

1196

- January 6 – Burchard du Puiset, Norman archdeacon
- April 23 – Béla III, king of Hungary and Croatia (b. 1148)
- April 25 – Alfonso II ("the Chaste"), king of Aragon (b. 1157)
- April 30 – Baldwin II van Holland, bishop of Utrecht
- July 12 – Maurice II de Craon, Norman nobleman
- August 14 – Henry IV ("the Blind"), count of Luxembourg
- August 15 – Conrad II, Duke of Swabia, German nobleman (b. 1172)
- September 11 – Maurice de Sully, bishop of Paris
- November 30 – Richard of Acerra, Norman nobleman
- Agnetha Ní Máelshechlainn, Irish abbess of Clonard
- Canute I (Eriksson), king of Sweden (approximate date)
- Dulcea of Worms, German Jewish businesswoman
- Ephraim of Bonn, German rabbi and writer (b. 1132)
- Eschiva of Ibelin, queen consort of Cyprus (b. 1160)
- Godfrey of Viterbo, Italian chronicler (approximate date)
- Hugh III of Rodez, French nobleman (House of Millau)
- Ibn Mada', Andalusian scholar and polymath (b. 1116)
- Isaac Komnenos Vatatzes, Byzantine aristocrat
- Ivan Asen I, ruler (tsar) of the Bulgarian Empire
- Jamal al-Din al-Ghaznawi, Arab jurist and theologian
- Roger fitzReinfrid, English sheriff and royal justice
- Taira no Kagekiyo, Japanese nobleman and samurai
- Vira Bahu I, ruler of the Kingdom of Polonnaruwa
- Vsevolod I Svyatoslavich ("the Fierce"), Kievan prince
- Wartislaw Swantibor ("the Younger"), Polish nobleman
- William Fitz Osbert, English politician and rebel leader
- William of Salisbury, English nobleman and high sheriff
- Yaish Ibn Yahya, Portuguese politician and advisor

1197

- April 23 – Davyd Rostislavich, Kievan Grand Prince (b. 1140)
- April 28 – Rhys ap Gruffydd, Welsh prince of Deheubarth
- June 1 – Gertrude of Bavaria, queen consort of Denmark
- July 9 – Rudolf of Wied, archbishop of Trier
- September 10 – Henry II, Count of Champagne (or Henry II), king of Jerusalem (b. 1166)
- September 18 – Margaret of France, Queen of England and Hungary, consort, daughter of Louis VII
- September 28 – Henry VI, Holy Roman Emperor (b. 1165)
- November 13 – Homobonus of Cremona, Italian merchant and saint
- December 12 – Wu (or Xiansheng), Chinese empress (b. 1115)
- Alix of France, French countess consort and regent (b. 1150)
- Bretislav III, bishop of Prague (House of Přemyslid) (b. 1137)
- Burhan al-Din al-Marghinani, Arab Hanafi jurist (b. 1135)
- Jamal al-Din al-Ghaznawi, Arab scholar and theologian
- Jón Loftsson, Icelandic chieftain and politician (b. 1124)
- Jordan Lupin, Italo-Norman nobleman and rebel leader
- Margaritus of Brindisi, Sicilian Grand Admiral (b. 1149)
- Owain Cyfeiliog (ap Gruffydd]]), Welsh prince (b. 1130)
- Peter II (or Theodor-Peter), ruler (tsar) of the Bulgaria
- Peter Cantor, French theologian and writer
- Ruadhri Ua Flaithbertaigh, Irish king of Iar Connacht
- Tughtakin ibn Ayyub, Ayyubid emir (prince) of Arabia
- Walter Devereux, Norman nobleman and knight (b. 1173)
- William de Longchamp, Norman nobleman and bishop

1198

- January 8 – Celestine III, pope of the Catholic Church (b. 1106)
- February 1 – Walram I (of Laurenburg), German nobleman
- March 11 – Marie of France, French princess and countess (b. 1145)
- April 16 – Frederick I (the Catholic), duke of Austria (b. 1175)
- July 7 – George II (Xiphilinos), patriarch of Constantinople
- July 24 – Berthold of Hanover, German apostle and bishop
- August 13 – Hellicha of Wittelsbach, duchess of Bohemia
- September 10 – Richard FitzNeal, bishop of London (b. 1130)
- November 27
  - Abraham ben David, French rabbi (b. 1125)
  - Constance I, queen regent of Sicily (b. 1154)
- November 29 – Al-Aziz Uthman, sultan of Egypt (b. 1171)
- December 2 – Ruaidrí Ua Conchobair, High King of Ireland
- December 11 – Averroes, Arab judge and physician (b. 1126)
- Abu Madyan, Andalusian mystic and Sufi master (b. 1126)
- Alix of France, French princess and countess (approximate date)
- Constantine II (de Martis), ruler of the Judicate of Logudoro
- Donatus of Ripacandida, Italian monk and saint (b. 1179)
- Dulce of Aragon (or Barcelona), queen of Portugal (b. 1160)
- Nerses of Lambron, Armenian archbishop and writer (b. 1153)
- Walter Fitz Robert, English nobleman and knight (b. 1124)
- William of Newburgh, English historian and writer (b. 1136)
- Yaroslav II Vsevolodovich, Kievan Grand Prince (b. 1139)

1199

- January 23 – Abu Yusuf Yaqub al-Mansur, Almohad caliph (b. 1160)
- February 9 – Minamoto no Yoritomo, Japanese shogun (b. 1147)
- February 13 – Stefan Nemanja, Serbian Grand Prince (b. 1113)
- March 17 – Jocelin of Glasgow (or Jocelyn), Scottish bishop
- April 5 – Ashikaga Yoshikane, Japanese samurai and monk
- April 6
  - Pierre Basile (or Bertran de Gurdun), French knight
  - Richard I (the Lionheart), king of England (b. 1157)
- July 10 – Hugh de Roxburgh (or Hugo), Scottish bishop
- August 20 – Matthew, Scottish churchman and bishop
- September 4 – Joan of England, queen of Sicily (b. 1165)
- October 9 – Bobo of San Teodoro, Italian cardinal-deacon
- November 6 – Hatim ibn Ibrahim, Yemeni religious leader
- November 25 – Albert III (the Rich), count of Habsburg
- December 25 – Helena of Hungary, duchess of Austria
- Alexios Komnenos, son of Andronikos I (Komnenos)
- Azalais of Toulouse (or Adelaide), French noblewoman
- Benedicta Ebbesdotter of Hvide, queen of Sweden (or 1200)
- Date Tomomune, Japanese nobleman and samurai (b. 1129)
- Michael the Syrian (the Great), Syriac patriarch (b. 1126)
- Raymond IV (or Raimund), count and regent of Tripoli
- Vladimir II Yaroslavich, Kievan prince (House of Rurik)
