= 1191 =

1191 in various calendars
- Gregorian calendar: 1191; MCXCI
- Ab urbe condita: 1944
- Armenian calendar: 640; ԹՎ ՈԽ
- Assyrian calendar: 5941
- Balinese saka calendar: 1112–1113
- Bengali calendar: 597–598
- Berber calendar: 2141
- English Regnal year: 2 Ric. 1 – 3 Ric. 1
- Buddhist calendar: 1735
- Burmese calendar: 553
- Byzantine calendar: 6699–6700
- Chinese calendar: 庚戌年 (Metal Dog); 3888 or 3681 — to — 辛亥年 (Metal Pig); 3889 or 3682
- Coptic calendar: 907–908
- Discordian calendar: 2357
- Ethiopian calendar: 1183–1184
- Hebrew calendar: 4951–4952
- Hindu calendars
- Vikram Samvat: 1247–1248
- Shaka Samvat: 1112–1113
- Kali Yuga: 4291–4292
- Holocene calendar: 11191
- Igbo calendar: 191–192
- Iranian calendar: 569–570
- Islamic calendar: 586–587
- Japanese calendar: Kenkyū 2 (建久２年)
- Javanese calendar: 1098–1099
- Julian calendar: 1191; MCXCI
- Korean calendar: 3524
- Minguo calendar: 721 before ROC 民前721年
- Nanakshahi calendar: −277
- Seleucid era: 1502/1503 AG
- Thai solar calendar: 1733–1734
- Tibetan calendar: ལྕགས་ཕོ་ཁྱི་ལོ་ (male Iron-Dog); 1317 or 936 or 164 — to — ལྕགས་མོ་ཕག་ལོ་ (female Iron-Boar); 1318 or 937 or 165

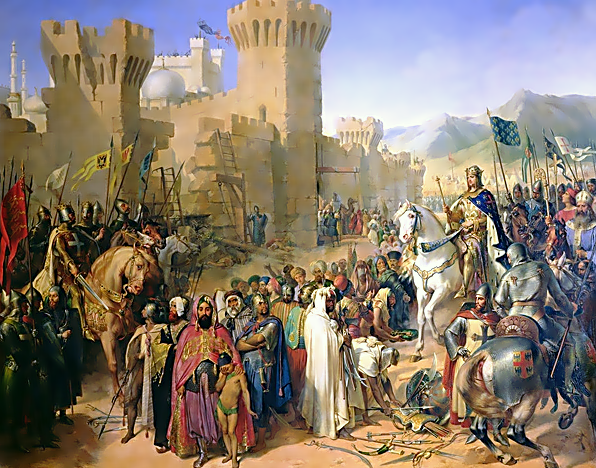
Acre surrenders to King Philip II (right).

Year 1191 (MCXCI) was a common year starting on Tuesday of the Julian calendar.

== Events ==
=== By place ===
==== Byzantine Empire ====
- April 10 – King Richard I (the Lionheart) leaves Messina for Palestina, but a storm drives his fleet apart. Richard is forced to seek shelter at a Cretan port – from which he has a tempestuous passage to Rhodes, where he stays for ten days (from April 22 to May 1), recovering from his sea-sickness. After some searching, he discovers that the ship carrying his sister Joan of England and his new fiancée, Berengaria of Navarre, is anchored on the south coast of Cyprus, along with the wrecks of several other vessels, including Richard's treasure ship. The survivors of the wrecks have been taken prisoner by Isaac Komnenos, the self-styled emperor of Cyprus.
- May 8 – Richard I and his main fleet arrive in the Byzantine port of Limassol on Cyprus. He orders Isaac Komnenos to release the prisoners and his treasure. Isaac refuses, Richard embarks his forces, and takes Limassol. The Byzantine population and also the Latin merchants in their dislike of Isaac, show themselves friendly to the English invaders. Various leading Crusaders of the Holy Land arrive in Limassol, on May 11. Among them are King Guy of Lusignan of Jerusalem, Bohemond III of Antioch, Humphrey IV of Toron, and Leo I of Armenia. They declare their support for Richard in return that he supports them against their rival, Conrad of Montferrat.
- May 12 – Richard I marries the 19-year-old Berengaria of Navarre, daughter of King Sancho VI (the Wise), in the Chapel of St. George at Limassol. On the same day, she is crowned Queen of England, by John, bishop of Évreux in the presence of the archbishop of Bordeaux and many other clergy. After this, hearing that the daughter of Isaac Komnenos has taken refuge in Kyrenia Castle, Richard goes there with his army and receives her submission. On the orders of Richard, she is entrusted to the care of Joan and Berengaria. By the end of May, Richard, with his ships, sails around the island seizing all the Cypriot towns and ports on the coast.
- June 1 – A Crusader force led by Richard I defeats the Byzantine army near the village of Tremithus. Isaac Komnenos flees from the battlefield to Kantara. Richard captures Isaac's banner and hunts down the remnants of his army. At Nicosia Richard becomes ill; Guy of Lusignan in command of Richard's forces, marches on Kyrenia and captures it, taking the empress and her child prisoner. Isaac is taken before Richard (in chains of silver) and accepts an unconditional surrender. Richard places garrisons in the towns and castles, and appoints Richard de Camville as governor of Cyprus, jointly with Robert of Thornham.
- Autumn – Emperor Isaac II (Angelos) leads a punitive expedition against Grand Prince Stefan Nemanja. The Serbians are defeated at South Morava and retreat into the mountains. The Byzantine forces raid all lands around the bank of the river and burn down Stefan's court in Kuršumlija. Nemanja does not surrender and starts irregular warfare and Isaac negotiates a peace treaty. The Serbians are forced to give up a large part of their conquests, east of the Velika Morava, and recognize Byzantine rule. Isaac recognizes Nemanja as Grand Prince of Serbia.

==== Third Crusade ====
- February 13 – Muslim forces attack and succeed in breaking the siege lines around Acre. Though the Crusaders seal the breach, Saladin is able to replenish the garrison, by sending reinforcements. For the defenders, this is a temporary respite – and Saladin is having difficulty keeping his army together. Taqi al-Din, Saladin's nephew and one of his most effective commanders, fails to rejoin the siege. He divides his army for his own territorial ambitions in modern southeastern Turkey. Later in the spring, Taqi al-Din brings his forces to support the double-siege at Acre.
- April 20 – King Philip II (Augustus) arrives with a Genoese flotilla (six ships) filled with French nobles and his cousin Conrad of Montferrat at Acre. He begins the construction of seven immense stone-throwers – which are used to bombard the city, on May 30. One of the siege-machines is called by the French soldiers the "Evil Neighbour" and "God's Own Sling", and a grappling ladder is known as the "Cat". Meanwhile, the walls of Acre are pounded relentlessly. The Crusaders built earthworks, ramparts, and ditches to protect themselves against Muslim attacks.
- June 8 – Richard I arrives with 25 ships and a strong advanced guard at Acre. Upon reaching the city, he is greeted by Philip II and then sets up his camp. Richard becomes almost immediately seriously ill (called Arnaldia) and is confined to his tent. Nevertheless, he leaps into action and secretly initiates negotiations with Saladin. After having been refused a personal meeting, Richard sends a Moroccan prisoner to Saladin's camp as a sign of goodwill. Finally, Saladin accepts a three-day truce and allows his younger brother, Al-Adil, to negotiate with Richard.
- June 25 – The Crusader armies (now totaling some 25,000 men) who are deployed around Acre, implement a unified strategy of assault-based siege. Teams of sappers and, increasingly massive use of advanced and new stone-throwing catapults, brought by Philip II and Richard I, are used to hammer Acre's walls continuously with giant, accurately loosed stones. By late June, the assault is beginning to undermine the walls, which are tottering. Because of troop shortages and disease, the Muslim defenders can not any longer strengthen their walls.
- July 3 – The Crusaders change their strategy from battering the Acre fortifications to exploiting the breaches. After only the first day of these all-out attacks to seize the city, Saladin's governor sends a message stating he would surrender unless he is relieved. Both French sappers and English catapults manage to make significant breaches in the walls – but the assault is repulsed. Meanwhile, Richard I, still unable to walk due to illness, is carried on a regal stretcher near the front lines from where he picks off Muslim troops on the walls using his crossbow.
- July 12 – Siege of Acre: The Muslim garrison surrenders to Philip II, which includes an agreement to give up the 70 Muslim ships in the harbour without Saladin's consent, and by the time that he learned of this intention, the city has already capitulated. Conrad of Montferrat, who has negotiated the surrender, raises the banners of the Kingdom of Jerusalem, and of the Crusader leaders Philip II, Richard I, and Leopold V of Austria, on the city's walls and towers. The siege of Acre has taken nearly two years and has cost some 100,000 Christian casualties.
- July 31 – Philip II, accompanied by Conrad of Montferrat, departs to Tyre and returns to France. He leaves behind a French army (some 10,000 men) under the command of Hugh III, duke of Burgundy. Richard I is left in sole command of the Crusader forces in the Levant. Back in France, Philip schemes with Richard's brother, Prince John, to dispossess Richard of his French lands while he is still away, but the intervention of John's mother, Queen Eleanor of Aquitaine, foils the plan. Meanwhile, Richard rebuilds and strengthens the walls of Acre.
- August 20 – Massacre of Ayyadieh: Richard I orders the execution of some 3,000 Muslim prisoners (captured after the siege of Acre), including women and children. The bound prisoners are mercilessly beheaded or cut down using swords and lances. A small group of Saladin's forces (located on Mount Tabor) tries to intervene in order to stop the massacre – but they are repelled. In response, Saladin executes all the Latin prisoners he himself has taken. In the Ayyubid Sultanate, Latin prisoners are tortured and murdered in reprisal for their infamy.
- August 22 – Richard I leads the Crusader forces (some 15,000 men) out of Acre and marches south along the coast, being closely supported by the Crusader fleet, carrying most of the supplies. Meanwhile, Saladin has given his son Al-Afdal orders to remain close to the Crusader rearguard under Hugh III, and strengthens the Muslim garrison both in Jerusalem and Ascalon with 20,000 men each. Richard advances at an unexpectedly slow pace and decides to make camp near Haifa – which Saladin has dismantled shortly before the fall of Acre.
- August 25–26 – Richard I leads a fast-moving advance-guard and establishes a strong position at the fortress near Merle before Saladin arrives. He then hurries back to support the rearguard, to regain contact with the Crusader forces. Richard reorganizes his marching column. The elite Templar and Hospitaller knights hold the van and rearguard, while Richard and a central mass of knights are screened on their landward left side by dense ranks of well-armoured infantry, whose panoply makes them almost immune to Muslim missile attacks.
- August 30 – Richard I advances in three divisions towards Caesarea, with the Crusader fleet accompanying him off-shore. The rearguard becomes engaged, and the French forces under Hugh III are nearly annihilated. Saladin has selected this part of the road for a major assault, but the Muslim attacks have little effect. The main effort to harass the Crusaders from a distance fails. Richard makes camp at the mouth of the Zarqa River, despite the intense heat, thirst, and the loss of many lives. Both armies rest and watch each other the rest of the day.
- September 2 – Richard I leads the Crusader army past Caesarea and is forced to turn inland, where he is separated from his supply ships. Saladin personally attacks the massed Crusader infantry, by bombarding them with arrows before charging their line with cavalry. During this brief but indecisive engagement, Richard is struck in the side by a crossbow bolt – though his armour absorbs much of the blow. By the end of the day, only 25 miles from Jaffa, Richard allows his men to rest (while recovering from his wounds) and re-assembles his forces.
- September 5 – Richard I dispatches envoys to request for peace talks and meets Al-Adil under a flag of truce. Saladin allows the Crusaders to forage in the Forrest of Arsuf. But Richard is in no mood for actual negotiations and demands nothing less than the cession of Palestina. Al-Adil at once breaks off the negotiations. Richard orders his forces to march quietly through the woods, and the Crusaders manage to reach the limits of the forest unhindered and unharmed. The Crusaders pitch their tents in the "Rochetaille" and rest for the night.
- September 7 – Battle of Arsuf: Richard I fights a pitched battle – while waiting for the ideal moment to mount a counterattack. However, the Hospitaller knights led by Garnier de Nablus break formation and launch a charge. Richard restores order in the turmoil and is forced to commit his entire army to support the attack. The Muslim forces flee in panic, but Saladin rallies them in time to defend his camp, and even to lead a counter-charge. By evening, Richard has defeated the Muslim forces, and Saladin retreats in good order to Ramallah.
- September 9–10 – Richard I and his Crusader forces march on to Jaffa and set about rebuilding its fortifications, which Saladin has destroyed by his scorched-earth policy. Mid-September, a large number of French nobles begin to resist – such as Hugh III. They argue about the refortification of Jaffa, instead of a direct strike inland on Jerusalem. Meanwhile, Saladin evacuates and demolishes most of the fortresses of southern Palestina.
- October 29 – Richard I marches with the Crusader forces onto the plains east of Jaffa and begins the slow, steady work of rebuilding a string of sites through which to advance on Jerusalem. During this period, the Third Crusade degenerates into a series of skirmishes. Richard uses diplomacy alongside military threats, hoping to bring Saladin to the point of submission before he has to make the siege of Jerusalem itself.
- December – Richard I and his Crusader forces occupy Latrun, while the advance-guard takes Bayt Nuba. He is warned by his nobles to take no further risks – due to winter conditions, and for being cut off if he presses on. Amongst those keenest on continuing are the French Crusaders under Hugh III. On December 25, Richard is now just 12 miles from Jerusalem.

==== Europe ====
- April 15 – Henry VI, son of the late Emperor Frederick I (Barbarossa), is crowned as Emperor of the Holy Roman Empire, together with his wife Constance by Pope Celestine III, on Easter Monday at Rome. Henry marches south and begins a campaign in Apulia. He besieges Naples, but encounters the resistance of Sicilian forces under Margaritus of Brindisi, who come to support the city's defense. Tusculum is destroyed by the rebel army of the Commune of Rome, on April 17.
- August – Margaritus of Brindisi defeats the Pisan fleet during the siege of Naples, and nearly destroys the late-arriving Genoese contingent. He keeps the harbour approaches open for supplies and reinforcements.
- Prince Yury Bogolyubsky leads a rebellion of disaffected Georgian nobleman against his ex-wife, Queen Tamara (the Great), but her forces win a two pitched battle at Tmogvi and Erusheti. Yury is captured, and Tamara allows him to withdraw to Constantinople.
- Henry VI is forced to raise the siege of Naples, due to an epidemic, and returns to Germany. Upon Henry's retreat, the Lombard cities that have surrendered to the Germans resubmit to Tancred of Lecce, king or usurper of Sicily. The populace of Salerno turn against Empress Constance during her visit to the city, and Margaritus of Brindisi delivers her to Tancred at Messina. Later, Constance is imprisoned at Castel dell'Ovo at Naples.
- The counties of Flanders and Hainaut (modern Belgium) are united under Count Baldwin VIII. Flanders, a feudal fiefdom of France, becomes an important, wealthy independent state of Western Europe.
- Siege of Silves – Almohad forces under Caliph Abu Yusuf Yaqub al-Mansur reconquer Silves in Portugal. In the same campaign, the Almohads take also Alcácer do Sal, while Palmela and Almada are sacked.
- Berthold V, duke of Zähringen, founds the city of Bern (modern Switzerland).
- King Canute VI leads a Danish Crusade to Finland.

==== England ====
- Spring – William de Longchamp, Chief Justiciar and regent, besieges Lincoln Castle accusing the castellan Gerard de Canville of corruption. In response, Prince John captures Nottingham and Tickhill castles from William. News of the dispute reaches Richard I, who sends Walter de Coutances, archbishop of Rouen, with orders to lead negotiations, for a peace between John and William.
- April – John and William de Longchamp meet at Winchester to discuss their differences. Several senior bishops are appointed as arbitrators. At the end of the meeting, both John and William agree to follow the recommendations. William is to return Lincoln Castle to Gerard de Canville and accepts limits to his powers. In return, John is to surrender Nottingham and Tickhill castles.
- September – Geoffrey, illegitimate son of the late King Henry II and half-brother to Richard I and John, lands secretly at Dover. He has been consecrated as the new archbishop of York while in Tours, and on his return is arrested by William de Longchamp. Citing the Winchester treaty, John seeks a meeting with William. Geoffrey is freed, William flees and heads to Dover Castle.
- October – William de Longchamp tries to hold the Tower of London against John's supporters for three days. He surrenders the Tower and escapes to continue his support for Richard I. On October 29, William is captured when disguised as a female merchant. John orders that he be expelled from the country.

==== Asia ====
- November 13 – Battle of Tarain: Sultan Muhammad of Ghor invades northern India, but is defeated by Rajput forces under Prithviraja III, ruler of Ajmer and Delhi. Prithviraj marches against the Ghurid army (some 100,000 men) with infantry, cavalry, and an elephant force. He repulses the Ghurid invasion near Taraori (some 70 miles of Delhi), Muhammad escapes the battlefield.
- The administration of the Taungoo region (modern Myanmar) is first recorded. King Narapatisithu appoints his son-in-law, Ananda Thuriya, as governor of Kanba Myint.
- King Jayavarman VII of the Khmer Empire sacks the capital of Champa (approximate date).

=== By topic ===
==== Religion ====
- March 20 – Pope Clement III dies at Rome after a pontificate of less than 3½ years. He is succeeded by the 85-year-old Celestine III as the 175th pope of the Catholic Church.
- The monks of Glastonbury Abbey dig up the remains of a large knight and a blonde woman, and announce they have discovered the tomb of King Arthur and Queen Guinevere.
- Sohrevardi,Persian philosopher and founder of the Iranian school of Illuminationism,was executed for heresy or starved to death according to some sources.He was executed on the order of al-Malik al-Zahir, son of Saladin.

== Births ==
- February 8 – Yaroslav II, Grand Prince of Vladimir (d. 1246)
- Geoffrey de Mandeville, English nobleman (approximate date)
- George IV (or Lasha Giorgi), king of Georgia (d. 1223)
- Joanna of Hohenstaufen, countess of Burgundy (d. 1205)
- Mafalda of Castile, Spanish princess (infanta) (d. 1204)
- Richard Marshal, Norman nobleman and knight (d. 1234)
- Stephen Devereux, Norman nobleman (approximate date)
- Theobald I, German nobleman (House of Lorraine) (d. 1220)
- Tolui, Mongol general and son of Genghis Khan (d. 1232)
- Yan Yu, Chinese poetry theorist and writer (d. 1241)

== Deaths ==
- January 14 – Berno, German missionary and bishop
- January 20
  - Frederick VI, son of Frederick I (Barbarossa) (b. 1167)
  - Theobald V (the Good), French nobleman (b. 1130)
- February 8 – Erard II, French nobleman (House of Brienne)
- February 24 – John I, French nobleman (House of Alençon)
- March 20 – Clement III, pope of the Catholic Church (b. 1130)
- April 1 – Engelbert II, German nobleman (House of Gorizia)
- June 10 – Barisone II of Torres, Sardinian ruler of Logudoro
- June 29 – William le Vavasour, English nobleman (b. 1131)
- July 3 – Albéric Clément, Marshal of France (b. 1165)
- July 7 – Judith of Hohenstaufen, German noblewoman
- August 1 – Philip of Alsace, Flemish nobleman (b. 1143)
- August 5 – Rudolf of Zähringen, archbishop of Mainz
- August 13 – Philip I, archbishop of Cologne (b. 1130)
- September 7 – James of Avesnes, French nobleman
- September 9 – Conrad II, duke of Bohemia (b. 1136)
- September 10 – Ralph de Warneville, Norman bishop
- October 15 – Raoul I (the Red), French nobleman
- December 15 – Welf VI, margrave of Tuscany (b. 1115)
- December 26 – Reginald Fitz Jocelin, English bishop
- Adam de Senlis, French Benedictine monk and abbot
- Agnes of Loon, German duchess and regent (b. 1150)
- Galeran V de Beaumont, French nobleman and knight
- Geoffroy III de Pons, French nobleman and knight
- Hugh VI (the Clever), French nobleman and knight
- John I of Ponthieu, Norman nobleman and knight
- Master Sibrand, founder of the Teutonic Knights
- Maurice of Carnoet, French Cistercian abbot (b. 1117)
- Mór Ní Tuathail, queen of Leinster (approximate date)
- Richard de Camville, English nobleman and governor
- Rupert III, German nobleman (House of Nassau)
- Shun'e (or Tayū no Kimi), Japanese (waka) poet
- Sohrevardi, Persian scholar and philosopher (b. 1154)
- Walter Ophamil (or Offamil), Sicilian archbishop
- William V (the Old), Italian nobleman and knight
- William Fitzstephen, English cleric and administrator

== In fiction ==
- The events of the Ubisoft video game Assassin's Creed take place this year.
- The Adventures of Robin Hood, 1938, Film, starring Errol Flynn and Olivia de Havilland. Claims to be set in this year.
