= 1197 =

1197 in various calendars
- Gregorian calendar: 1197; MCXCVII
- Ab urbe condita: 1950
- Armenian calendar: 646; ԹՎ ՈԽԶ
- Assyrian calendar: 5947
- Balinese saka calendar: 1118–1119
- Bengali calendar: 603–604
- Berber calendar: 2147
- English Regnal year: 8 Ric. 1 – 9 Ric. 1
- Buddhist calendar: 1741
- Burmese calendar: 559
- Byzantine calendar: 6705–6706
- Chinese calendar: 丙辰年 (Fire Dragon); 3894 or 3687 — to — 丁巳年 (Fire Snake); 3895 or 3688
- Coptic calendar: 913–914
- Discordian calendar: 2363
- Ethiopian calendar: 1189–1190
- Hebrew calendar: 4957–4958
- Hindu calendars
- Vikram Samvat: 1253–1254
- Shaka Samvat: 1118–1119
- Kali Yuga: 4297–4298
- Holocene calendar: 11197
- Igbo calendar: 197–198
- Iranian calendar: 575–576
- Islamic calendar: 593–594
- Japanese calendar: Kenkyū 8 (建久８年)
- Javanese calendar: 1104–1106
- Julian calendar: 1197; MCXCVII
- Korean calendar: 3530
- Minguo calendar: 715 before ROC 民前715年
- Nanakshahi calendar: −271
- Seleucid era: 1508/1509 AG
- Thai solar calendar: 1739–1740
- Tibetan calendar: མེ་ཕོ་འབྲུག་ལོ་ (male Fire-Dragon); 1323 or 942 or 170 — to — མེ་མོ་སྦྲུལ་ལོ་ (female Fire-Snake); 1324 or 943 or 171

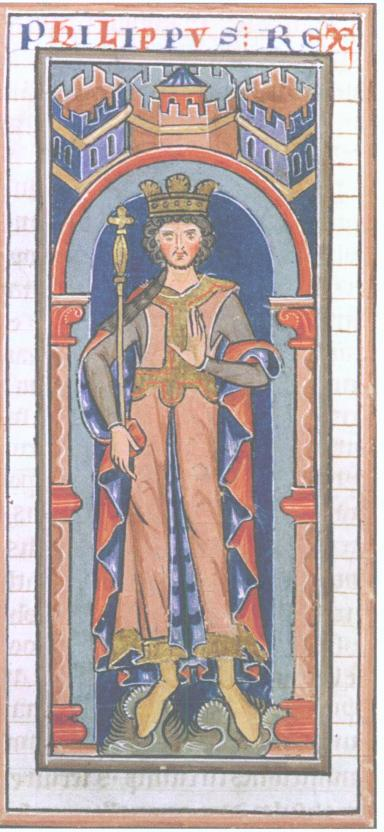
Portrait of Philip of Swabia (1177–1208)

Year 1197 (MCXCVII) was a common year starting on Wednesday of the Julian calendar.

== Events ==
=== By place ===
==== Europe ====
- Spring – Emperor Henry VI travels to Italy to persuade Pope Celestine III to crown his infant son Frederick II, who has been elected "King of the Romans" at Frankfurt.
- King Richard I of England (the Lionheart) has Château Gaillard (Normandy) built on the Seine River as he fights to restore Angevin power in northern France (approximate date).
- Summer – Henry VI takes cruel measures to put down Jordan Lupin's insurrection in Sicily and southern Italy, which has been provoked by the oppression of his German officials.
- June/July – German crusaders launch a raid on Silves.
- September 28 – Henry VI dies of malaria at Messina (also possibly poisoned), while preparing an expedition against the Byzantine usurper Alexios III Angelos.
- Autumn – A German throne dispute begins upon the sudden death of Henry VI. Henry's brother, Philip of Swabia, takes over the family lands and claims his inheritance.
- Autumn – A brothers' quarrel breaks out between Emeric, King of Hungary and his younger brother Duke Andrew. After a brief skirmish, Emeric is forced to cede Croatia and Dalmatia to Andrew, who begins to administer the provinces as a de facto sovereign monarch.
- Winter – Duke Ottokar I forces his brother, Vladislaus III, to abandon Bohemia. Ottokar restores power and Vladislaus accepts the margravial title of Moravia.
- Saracen pirates, from the Balearic Islands, raid the city of Toulon in Provence, and the Benedictine monastery of Saint Honorat, on the Lérins Islands.
- Northern Crusades: Danish forces led by King Canute VI raid the area of present-day Estonia.
- Civil war era in Norway: conflict between king Sverre of Norway and the party of Bagler.

==== Wales ====
- April 28 – Rhys ap Gruffydd, a Welsh prince, dies and is succeeded by his eldest son Gruffydd ap Rhys II. With the help of Gwenwynwyn, his brother Maelgwn ap Rhys invades southern Wales.
- Summer – Gruffydd ap Rhys II is captured and handed over to Gwenwynwyn, who transfers him to the English. Gruffydd is imprisoned at Corfe Castle and Maelgwn ap Rhys claims the throne.

==== Levant ====
- September 10 – Henry II, Count of Champagne, king of Jerusalem, dies from falling out a first-floor window at his palace in Acre. His widow, Isabella I, becomes regent while the kingdom is thrown into consternation.
- September 22 – About 16,000 German crusaders reach Acre, starting the crusade of 1197. Emperor Henry VI, who planned to join the forces later on, was forced to stay behind in Sicily due to illness. On September 28 he dies at Messina. Meanwhile, the crusaders manage to reconquer Sidon and Beirut but return to Germany after receiving the news of the emperor's death.

==== Asia ====
- Genghis Khan (or Temüjin), with help from the Keraites, defeats the Jurchens of the Jin dynasty. The Jin bestow Genghis' blood brother Toghrul with the honorable title of Ong Khan, and Genghis receives the lesser title of j'aut quri. During the winter, Toghrul returns and re-establishes himself as leader of the Keraites.

=== By topic ===
==== Religion ====
- Arbroath Abbey located in the Scottish town of Arbroath, is consecrated and dedicated to St. Thomas Becket.

== Births ==
- October 22 – Juntoku, emperor of Japan (d. 1242)
- Amadeus IV, count of Savoy (House of Savoy) (d. 1253)
- Dharmasvamin, Tibetan monk and pilgrim (d. 1264)
- Ibn al-Baitar, Moorish botanist and pharmacist (d. 1248)
- John de Braose (Tadody), English nobleman (or 1198)
- Naratheinga Uzana, Burmese prince and regent (d. 1235)
- Nicola Paglia, Italian priest and preacher (d. 1256)
- Nikephoros Blemmydes, Byzantine theologian (d. 1272)
- Oberto Pallavicino, Italian nobleman (signore) (d. 1269)
- Raymond VII, French nobleman and knight (d. 1249)
- Richard of Chichester, English bishop of Chichester (d. 1253)
- William de Braose, English nobleman (d. 1230)

== Deaths ==
- April 23 – Davyd Rostislavich, Kievan Grand Prince (b. 1140)
- April 28 – Rhys ap Gruffydd, Welsh prince of Deheubarth
- June 1 – Gertrude of Bavaria, queen consort of Denmark
- July 9 – Rudolf of Wied, archbishop of Trier
- September 10 – Henry II, Count of Champagne (or Henry II), king of Jerusalem (b. 1166)
- September 18 – Margaret of France, Queen of England and Hungary, consort, daughter of Louis VII
- September 28 – Henry VI, Holy Roman Emperor (b. 1165)
- November 13 – Homobonus of Cremona, Italian merchant and saint
- December 12 – Wu (or Xiansheng), Chinese empress (b. 1115)
- Alix of France, French countess consort and regent (b. 1150)
- Bretislav III, bishop of Prague (House of Přemyslid) (b. 1137)
- Burhan al-Din al-Marghinani, Arab Hanafi jurist (b. 1135)
- Jamal al-Din al-Ghaznawi, Arab scholar and theologian
- Jón Loftsson, Icelandic chieftain and politician (b. 1124)
- Jordan Lupin, Italo-Norman nobleman and rebel leader
- Margaritus of Brindisi, Sicilian Grand Admiral (b. 1149)
- Owain Cyfeiliog (ap Gruffydd), Welsh prince (b. 1130)
- Peter II (or Theodor-Peter), ruler (tsar) of the Bulgaria
- Peter Cantor, French theologian and writer
- Ruadhri Ua Flaithbertaigh, Irish king of Iar Connacht
- Tughtakin ibn Ayyub, Ayyubid emir (prince) of Arabia
- Walter Devereux, Norman nobleman and knight (b. 1173)
- William de Longchamp, Norman nobleman and bishop
