= Nyūdō shinnō =

Nyūdō shinnō (入道親王, lit. "ordination prince") is a title bestowed to imperial sons who left the court and took tonsure as Buddhist monks.

Ordination resulted in relinquishment of imperial status and devotion to the welfare of the imperial family through prayer and ritual service. Other names used to designate the same status include Nyūdō-no-miya (入道宮, lit. "Imperial ordination") and Ubasoku-no-miya (優婆塞宮, lit. "Imperial upāsaka").

This title was reserved for those who had already been declared imperial prince by imperial proclamation (親王宣下). By contrast, those declared prince after ordination held the title hosshinnō (法親王, lit. "Dharma prince").

== Examples ==
- Prince Dōjonyūdō
- Prince Kakujun Nyūdō

== See also ==
- Cloistered Emperor
