= 1193 =

1193 in various calendars
- Gregorian calendar: 1193; MCXCIII
- Ab urbe condita: 1946
- Armenian calendar: 642; ԹՎ ՈԽԲ
- Assyrian calendar: 5943
- Balinese saka calendar: 1114–1115
- Bengali calendar: 599–600
- Berber calendar: 2143
- English Regnal year: 4 Ric. 1 – 5 Ric. 1
- Buddhist calendar: 1737
- Burmese calendar: 555
- Byzantine calendar: 6701–6702
- Chinese calendar: 壬子年 (Water Rat); 3890 or 3683 — to — 癸丑年 (Water Ox); 3891 or 3684
- Coptic calendar: 909–910
- Discordian calendar: 2359
- Ethiopian calendar: 1185–1186
- Hebrew calendar: 4953–4954
- Hindu calendars
- Vikram Samvat: 1249–1250
- Shaka Samvat: 1114–1115
- Kali Yuga: 4293–4294
- Holocene calendar: 11193
- Igbo calendar: 193–194
- Iranian calendar: 571–572
- Islamic calendar: 588–590
- Japanese calendar: Kenkyū 4 (建久４年)
- Javanese calendar: 1100–1101
- Julian calendar: 1193; MCXCIII
- Korean calendar: 3526
- Minguo calendar: 719 before ROC 民前719年
- Nanakshahi calendar: −275
- Seleucid era: 1504/1505 AG
- Thai solar calendar: 1735–1736
- Tibetan calendar: ཆུ་ཕོ་བྱི་བ་ལོ་ (male Water-Rat); 1319 or 938 or 166 — to — ཆུ་མོ་གླང་ལོ་ (female Water-Ox); 1320 or 939 or 167

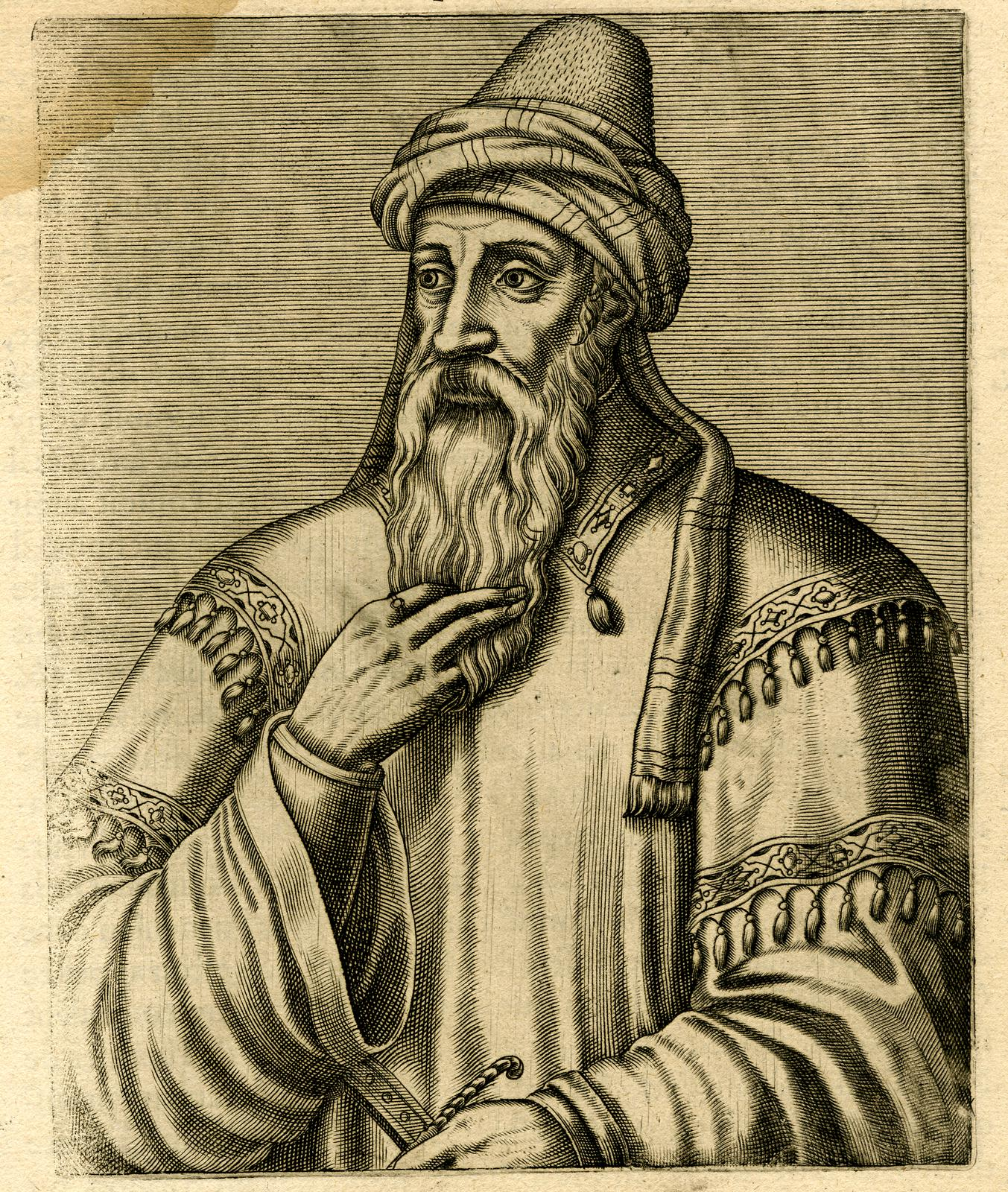
Saladin (the Lion) (1137–1193)

Year 1193 (MCXCIII) was a common year starting on Friday of the Julian calendar.

== Events ==
=== By place ===
==== Levant ====
- March 4 – Saladin (the Lion) dies of a fever at Damascus. The lands of the Ayyubid dynasty of Syria and Egypt are split among his relatives. During his reign, he briefly unites the Muslim world, and drives the Crusaders out of Jerusalem to a narrow strip of coast. At the time of his death, Saladin has seventeen sons and one little daughter. Al-Afdal succeeds his father as ruler (emir) of Damascus, and inherits the headship of the Ayyubid family. His younger brother, the 22-year-old Al-Aziz, proclaims himself as independent sultan of Egypt. Al-Zahir receives Aleppo (with lands in northern Syria), and Turan-Shah receives Yemen. The other dominions and fiefs in the Oultrejordain (also called Lordship of Montréal) are divided between his sons and the two remaining brothers of Saladin.
- May – The Pisan colony at Tyre plots to seize the city, and hand it over to Guy of Lusignan – the ruler of Cyprus. King Henry I of Jerusalem arrests the ringleaders, and orders that the colony be reduced to only 30 people. The Pisans retaliate, by raiding the coastal villages between Tyre and Acre.

==== Europe ====
- February 14 – King Richard I (the Lionheart), previously imprisoned on his return from the Third Crusade by Leopold V (the Virtuous), duke of Austria is handed over to Emperor Henry VI, and moved to Trifels Castle.
- King Philip II (Augustus) marries Ingeborg of Denmark, daughter of King Valdemar I (the Great). After the marriage, Philip changes his mind, wishes to obtain a separation, and attempts to send her back to Denmark.
- King Tancred of Sicily arranges a marriage between his son Roger III and the 12-year-old Irene Angelina, daughter of the Byzantine emperor Isaac II (Angelos). Roger suddenly dies on December 24.

==== Asia ====
- Ghurid forces under Qutb al-Din Aibak capture Delhi. General Muhammad bin Bakhtiyar Khilji sacks and burns the ancient city of Nalanda, India's greatest Buddhist seat of learning, and the university of Vikramashila.

== Births ==
- July 28 – Kujō Michiie, Japanese nobleman (d. 1252)
- Alice of Champagne, queen of Cyprus (d. 1246)
- Altheides, Cypriot philosopher and writer (d. 1262)
- Beatrice II, French countess palatine (d. 1231)
- Henri de Dreux, French archbishop (d. 1240)
- Frederick of Isenberg, German nobleman (d. 1226)
- Giovanni da Penna, Italian Franciscan priest (d. 1271)
- John III (Doukas Vatatzes), emperor of Nicaea (d. 1254)
- John Angelos (Good John), Byzantine prince (d. 1253)
- John Devereux, Norman nobleman (approximate date)
- Juliana of Liège, Belgian nun and mystic (d. 1258)
- Margaret of Scotland, English noblewoman (d. 1259)
- Sayyed Ibn Tawus, Arab jurist and theologian (d. 1266)
- William de Ferrers, English nobleman (d. 1254)

== Deaths ==
- March 4 – Saladin (the Lion), sultan of Egypt and Syria (b. 1137)
- June 13 – Pedro de Artajona, Spanish nobleman and bishop
- June 27 – Robert FitzRalph, English archdeacon and bishop
- August 2 – Mieszko the Younger, duke of Kalisz (House of Piast)
- September 14 – Minamoto no Noriyori, Japanese general (b. 1150)
- September 23 – Robert IV, French nobleman and Grand Master
- December 23 – Thorlak Thorhallsson, Icelandic bishop (b. 1133)
- December 24 – Roger III, king of Sicily (House of Hauteville)
- Balian of Ibelin (the Younger), French nobleman and knight
- Derbforgaill ingen Maeleachlainn (or Derval), Irish princess
- Düsum Khyenpa, Tibetan spiritual leader (karmapa) (b. 1110)
- Fan Chengda, Chinese politician and geographer (b. 1126)
- Ren Zong, Chinese emperor of the Western Xia (b. 1124)
- Walter de Berkeley, Scottish nobleman (approximate date)
