= 1256 =

1256 in various calendars
- Gregorian calendar: 1256; MCCLVI
- Ab urbe condita: 2009
- Armenian calendar: 705; ԹՎ ՉԵ
- Assyrian calendar: 6006
- Balinese saka calendar: 1177–1178
- Bengali calendar: 662–663
- Berber calendar: 2206
- English Regnal year: 40 Hen. 3 – 41 Hen. 3
- Buddhist calendar: 1800
- Burmese calendar: 618
- Byzantine calendar: 6764–6765
- Chinese calendar: 乙卯年 (Wood Rabbit); 3953 or 3746 — to — 丙辰年 (Fire Dragon); 3954 or 3747
- Coptic calendar: 972–973
- Discordian calendar: 2422
- Ethiopian calendar: 1248–1249
- Hebrew calendar: 5016–5017
- Hindu calendars
- Vikram Samvat: 1312–1313
- Shaka Samvat: 1177–1178
- Kali Yuga: 4356–4357
- Holocene calendar: 11256
- Igbo calendar: 256–257
- Iranian calendar: 634–635
- Islamic calendar: 653–654
- Japanese calendar: Kenchō 8 / Kōgen 1 (康元元年)
- Javanese calendar: 1165–1166
- Julian calendar: 1256; MCCLVI
- Korean calendar: 3589
- Minguo calendar: 656 before ROC 民前656年
- Nanakshahi calendar: −212
- Thai solar calendar: 1798–1799
- Tibetan calendar: ཤིང་མོ་ཡོས་ལོ་ (female Wood-Hare); 1382 or 1001 or 229 — to — མེ་ཕོ་འབྲུག་ལོ་ (male Fire-Dragon); 1383 or 1002 or 230

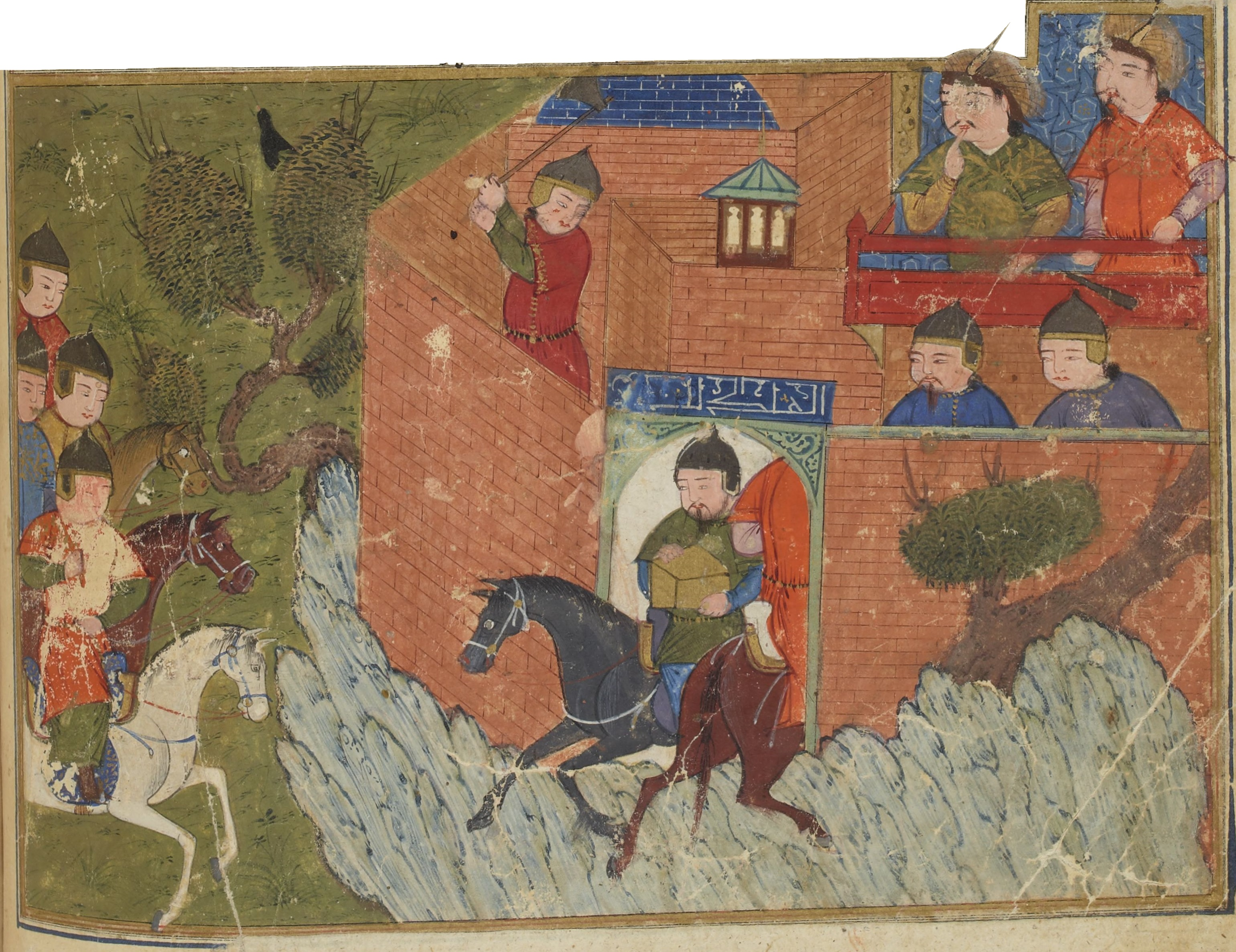
Hulagu Khan conquers Alamut Castle

Year 1256 (MCCLVI) was a leap year starting on Saturday of the Julian calendar.

== Events ==
=== By place ===
==== Mongol Empire ====
- Spring – Mongol forces (some 80,000 men), under Hulagu Khan, cross the Oxus River, and begin their campaign to destroy the remaining Muslim states in southwestern Asia – with the first objectives being the Nizari Ismaili strongholds and Baghdad, the capital of the Abbasid Caliphate. The roads across Turkestan and Persia are repaired, and bridges built. Carts are requisitioned to bring siege machines from China.
- October – Mongol forces led by Baiju Noyan (operating under Hulagu Khan's command) win a victory over Kaykaus II, Seljuk ruler of the Sultanate of Rum, and capture Anatolia. Kaykaus flees to the Byzantine court where he seeks refuge at Constantinople. The Empire of Trebizond fearing a potential punitive Mongol expedition, becomes a vassal state and is forced to pay a tribute tax every year in gold and silk.
- November 8–23 – Siege of Maymun-Diz: Mongol forces under Hulagu Khan successfully besiege the mountain castle of Maymun-Diz. Hulagu encircles the fortress and begins a bombardment for three days by mangonels from a nearby hilltop. On November 19, Nizari Isma'ili imam Rukn al-Din Khurshah surrenders, but a small part of the garrison refuses and fights a last stand, until they are killed after three days.
- December 15 – Mongol forces under Hulagu Khan capture and dismantle Alamut Castle (near the Masoudabad region) after the surrender of the Nizari Ismaili leaders. Hulagu founds the Ilkhanate dynasty of Persia, which becomes one of the four main divisions of the Mongol Empire. The Nizari Ismaili government is disestablished; some of them migrate to Afghanistan, Badakhshan and Sindh (modern Pakistan).

==== Europe ====
- War of the Euboeote Succession: Achaean forces under William II of Villehardouin attempt to gain control of the island of Euboea, which is resisted by the local Lombard barons (or "triarchs") with the aid of the Republic of Venice. William launches devastating raids in Euboea. Guy I de la Roche, the "Great Lord" of Athens and Thebes, enters the war against William, along with other barons of Central Greece.
- 30 July – The Venetian Marsilio Zorzi recaptures Curzola in Dalmatia, and re-establishes himself as Count of Curzola and Mèleda.

==== British Isles ====
- Prince Llywelyn ap Gruffudd invades the northern coastal areas of Wales that agreed to English rule in 1254. The Lord Edward, who has been given the areas to govern himself by his father, King Henry III of England, asks him for support but Henry refuses.
- The ancient Irish Kingdom of Breifne splits into East Breifne and West Breifne, after a war between the O'Reillys and the O'Rourkes.

==== Levant ====
- War of Saint Sabas: A dispute between Venice and Genoa arises about concerning land in Acre owned by Mar Saba but claimed by both Venice and Genoa – which leads to a Genoese attack of the monastery in the Venetian quarter. The Venetians are supported by Pisa and the Knights Templar, while the Genoese are joined by the Knights Hospitaller.

=== By topic ===
==== Natural Disaster ====
- June 30 – A large volcanic eruption in Harrat Rahat (near Medina) is associated with an Islamic prophecy.

==== Religion ====
- May 4 – Pope Alexander IV issues the papal bull Licet ecclesiae catholicae, constituting the Order of Saint Augustine at Lecceto Monastery.
- August 25 – In Bologna, slavery and serfdom are abolished; this event is recorded in the document called Liber Paradisus (or Heaven Book).

== Births ==
- January 6 – Gertrude the Great, German mystic (d. 1302)
- January 24 – Alonso Pérez de Guzmán, Spanish nobleman (d. 1309)
- February 9 – William de Warenne, English nobleman (d. 1286)
- March 21 – Henry I, Margrave of Brandenburg ("Lackland"), German nobleman (d. 1318)
- October 23 – Möngke Temür, Mongol ruler of Shiraz (d. 1282)
- Abu Hayyan al-Gharnati, Andalusian grammarian (d. 1344)
- Adolph VI, count of Holstein-Pinneberg-Schauenburg (d. 1315)
- Ahmad al-Suhrawardi, Persian calligrapher and musician (d. 1340)
- Al-Dimashqi, Syrian geographer, explorer and writer (d. 1327)
- Andrea Dotti, Italian nobleman, preacher and saint (d. 1315)
- Ibn al-Banna, Almohad scholar and mathematician (d. 1321)
- Jamal al-Din al-Mizzi, Syrian scholar and philologist (d. 1341)
- John Segrave, English nobleman and seneschal (d. 1325)
- Padishah Khatun, Mongol female ruler and writer (d. 1295)
- Robert, Count of Clermont, French prince and nobleman (d. 1317)
- Roger Mortimer, English nobleman and constable (d. 1326)

== Deaths ==
- January 4 – Bernhard von Spanheim, German nobleman
- January 18 – Maria of Brabant, duchess of Bavaria (b. 1226)
- January 28 – William II of Holland, king of Germany (b. 1227)
- February 9 – Alice de Lusigan, English noblewoman (b. 1224)
- February 16 – Nicola Paglia, Italian Dominican priest (b. 1197)
- April 12 – Margaret of Bourbon, queen consort of Navarre (b. 1217)
- April 23 – Sabrisho V, patriarch of the Church of the East
- May 1 – Mafalda of Portugal, abbess, previously queen consort of Castile
- May 6 – Peter Nolasco, French religious leader (b. 1189)
- May 12 – Matilda of Amboise, French noblewoman (b. 1200)
- May 28 – Guglielmo Fieschi, Italian deacon and cardinal
- June 13 – Tankei, Japanese Buddhist sculptor (b. 1173)
- September 1 – Kujō Yoritsune, Japanese shogun (b. 1218)
- September 21 – William of Kilkenny, English bishop of Ely
- October 14 – Kujō Yoritsugu, Japanese shogun (b. 1239)
- November 5 – Christina de Valognes, Scottish noblewoman
- Bertram de Criol (or Criel), English constable and diplomat
- Jacob Anatoli, French Jewish translator and writer (b. 1194)
- Johannes de Sacrobosco, English scholar and astronomer
- Klement of Ruszcza, Polish nobleman and knight (b. 1190)
- Najm al-Din Razi, Persian philosopher and writer (b. 1177)
- Pandulf of Anagni, Italian bishop and military commander
- Peter de Ramsay, Scottish nobleman, cleric and bishop
- Þórður kakali Sighvatsson, Icelandic chieftain (b. 1210)
- Rodrigo González Girón, Spanish nobleman and knight
- Sibt ibn al-Jawzi, Arab preacher and historian (b. 1185)
