= Isaac II =

Isaac II may refer to:

- Isaac II Angelos, Byzantine emperor (1185–1195, 1203–1204)
- Isaac II of Antioch (r. 1709–1723), Syriac Orthodox patriarch
- Isaac II of Optina (1865–1938), superior of Optina Monastery
- Isaac II Thuret (died 1706), clockmaker

== See also ==
- Isaac I
