= Prince Dōjonyūdō =

Prince Dōjonyūdō (道助入道親王, Dōjonyūdō shinnō, 1196-1249) was a waka poet and Japanese nobleman active in the early Kamakura period. He was a son of Emperor Go-Toba.

Prince Dōjonyūdō is designated as a member of the New Thirty-Six Immortals of Poetry (新三十六歌仙, Shinsanjūrokkasen).
