= Kantara, İskele =

Kantara
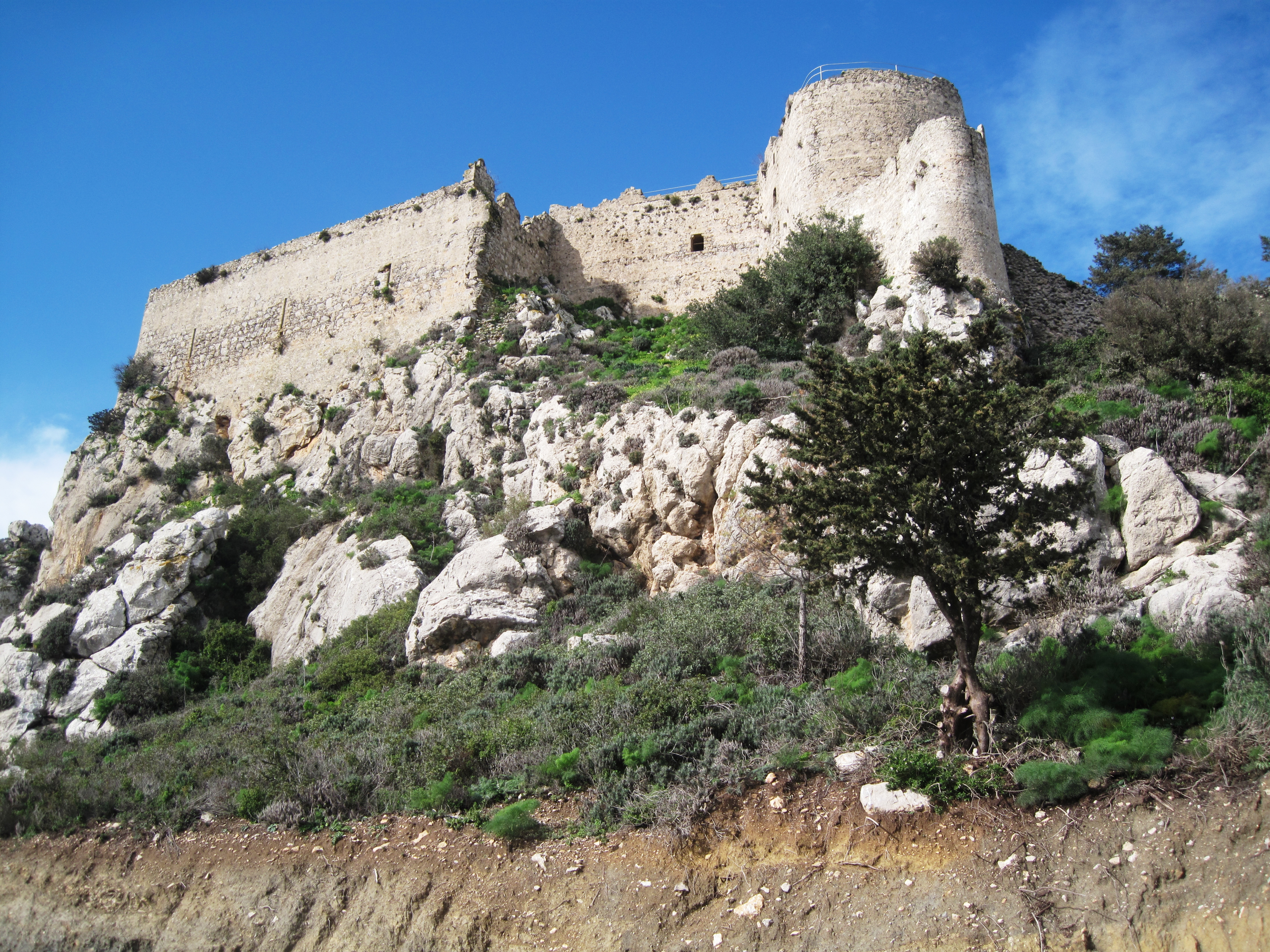
- Kantara castle

- Location within Cyprus
- Coordinates: 35°23′16″N 33°53′55″E
- Country (de jure): Cyprus
  - District: Famagusta District
- Country (de facto): Northern Cyprus
  - District: İskele District

Population (2011)
  - Total: 21
- Time zone: UTC+2 (EET)
  - Summer (DST): UTC+3 (EEST)

Kantara (Greek: Καντάρα) is a village in the Famagusta District of Cyprus, located south-west of Kantara Castle. It is under the de facto control of Northern Cyprus.
