= Giovanni da Penna =

Italian Roman Catholic priest

Blessed Giovanni da Penna O.F.M.

Priest
- Born: 1193; Penna San Giovanni, Fermo, Papal States
- Died: 3 April 1271 (aged 78); Recanati, Macerata, Papal States
- Venerated in: Roman Catholic Church
- Beatified: 20 December 1806, Saint Peter's Basilica, Papal States by Pope Pius VII
- Feast: 3 April
- Attributes: Franciscan habit

Giovanni da Penna (1193 - 3 April 1271) was an Italian Roman Catholic priest and a professed member of the Order of Friars Minor. He became a Franciscan in 1213 after hearing Fra Filippo - one of the disciples of Francis of Assisi - preach. He spent over two decades in France where he oversaw the establishment of Franciscan houses before returning to the Italian peninsula where he served his life in quiet cloistered retirement.

His beatification received the papal approval of Pope Pius VII on 20 December 1806 after the latter decreed that there existed an enduring and popular local 'cultus' - or devotion to the late priest - through the centuries.

== Life ==
Giovanni da Penna was born in 1193 in Penna San Giovanni.

He became a professed member of the Order of Friars Minor in 1213 in Recanati. Fra Filippo - sent to Penna San Giovanni at the behest of Francis of Assisi - came to preach in the church of Saint Stephen and so he attended this sermon and listened in astonishment while afterwards begging to be received into the order and vested in its habit. Fra Filippo told the hopeful that he would receive him into the order if he were to go to Recanati.

The now ordained priest attended the provincial chapter of the Franciscans in Recanati, and was sent to Languedoc in 1217 alongside other companions to spread the work of the order there. It was there that he desired his life would soon come to a close so that he could return to God and so he sat under a tree to reflect and beseeched the Lord to take him - but a voice responded that he still had much work to do on Earth. He founded several houses for the order in Provence in France during an apostolate that spanned over two decades. He returned to the Italian peninsula in 1242 after a messenger from the Father Provincial came to summon him back and he returned to live the bulk of three decades in cloistered retirement. In 1248 he settled civil unrest in his hometown after writing a pact that was used during negotiations.

He spent one full night until the next dawn in spiritual reflection until an angel appeared and foretold that the priest would soon die. He offered the priest a choice: to spend a day in Purgatory or to expiate his remaining sins through one full week of suffering - he chose the latter. Da Penna fell ill at once with a high fever and total pain including gout in his hands and feet. The devil also came to him in a vision with a list of all the sins he committed and said to him: "Because of these sins which thou hast committed in thought, word, and deed, thou art condemned to the depths of Hell". This depressed him to the point where he told this to his fellow friars who at once summoned the aged Matteo da Monte Robbiano - who was a confessor on occasion for da Penna and a close friend - who arrived not long before his death. Robbiano encouraged da Penna instead and comforted him and said it was a mere trick of Satan.

Da Penna died on 3 April 1271 after his week of suffering.

== Beatification ==
Da Penna's beatification received approval from Pope Pius VII on 20 December 1806 after the latter ratified that the priest did in fact have a local 'cultus' - otherwise known as popular veneration - that endured through the centuries.
