= Saint Margaret of England =

12th-century nun of English descent

- Born: Hungary
- Died: 1192; Abbey of Sauvebénite, Auvergne, France
- Venerated in: Cistercian Order
- Feast: 3 February
- Patronage: the dying

Saint Margaret of England OCist (died 1192) was born in Hungary to an Englishwoman who was related to Thomas Becket, the murdered Archbishop of Canterbury.

When she was grown, Margaret took her mother with her on a pilgrimage to Jerusalem, and they then settled in Bethlehem, where they lived austere lives of penance. Her mother died there in the Holy Land. After that Margaret made pilgrimages to the Virgin of Montserrat in Spain, and then to Our Lady of Le Puy in Le Puy-en-Velay, in the Auvergne region of France.

She then became a Cistercian nun at the Abbey of Sauvebénite near Le Puy, where she died. Miracles were reported at her tomb, and it became a pilgrimage site. Margaret's feast day is observed on 3 February.
