= Altheides =

Altheides (1193–1262) was a Cypriot philosopher, primarily known from sayings attributed to him in the works of others. Little is known about the wandering philosopher known as Altheides of Cyprus, and little of his work remains available to modern scholars.

His parents were Greek merchants living on the island under the rule of Guy of Lusignan. He was born a year before Guy's death, in 1193. At some point in his late teens he left the Kingdom of Cyprus as a seaman on a Moorish trading vessel. Altheides again turns up in historical records with the founding of his School of Philosophy in Jerusalem in 1226, under the rule of al-Kamil, the nephew of Saladin and ruler of Jerusalem. His school was never particularly successful, and dispersed shortly after al-Kamil's treaty of 1229 signing the city back over to the Crusaders. From this point very little is known. Scattered accounts and writings appear here and there in as varied locations as Spain, Morocco, Rome, and Egypt. Altheides died near his childhood home in Cyprus in 1262.

Altheides never wrote a serious philosophical work or treatise and is primarily known for his many wise sayings, primarily found in other works written in the early thirteenth century.
