= William le Vavasour =

Sir William le Vavasour of Hazlewood, (c. 1131 - 29 June 1191) was the 1st Lord of Hazlewood, a prominent judge, a powerful land owner in Yorkshire (Hazlewood Castle) and one of the witnesses to the Charters of Sawley Abbey. The family seat at Hazlewood Castle should not be confused with the hamlet of Hazlewood near Skipton - they are some 30 miles apart and are not connected. William was born in Yorkshire, England to a noble Norman family. His father Sir Mauger le Vavasour III was a prominent knight and his great-grandfather Sir Mauger le Vavasour was the door-keeper to William the Conqueror. William is the patriarch and founder of the Vavasour family.

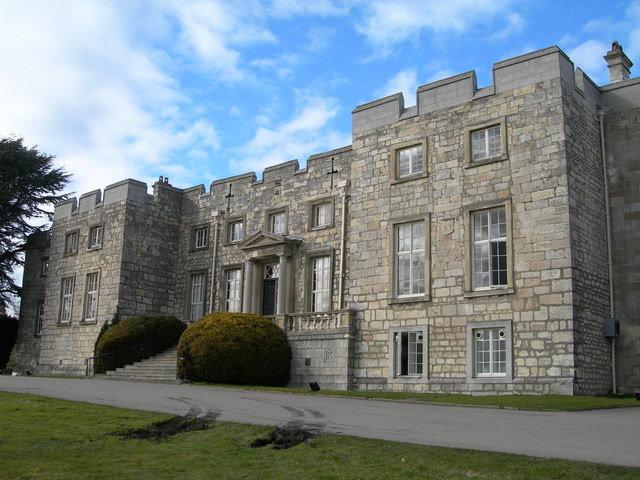
Hazlewood Castle, the historic seat of the Vavasour family.
