= Adam de Senlis =

Benedictine monk and abbot

Adam de Senlis (died 1191), also called Adam of Evesham, was a Benedictine monk who became abbot of Evesham Abbey.

Adam de Senlis was a monk of Notre Dame de la Charité-sur-Loire, Nièvre, afterwards joined to Cluny, and became prior of Bermondsey Abbey in 1157, and for that monastery he obtained important privileges in 1160 from Henry II. In 1161 he was made Abbot of Evesham Abbey, where he completed the cloister, finished St. Egwine's shrine, glazed many of the windows, and made an aqueduct. He obtained the right to use episcopal ornaments in 1163, Evesham being the first abbey which obtained the use of the mitre for its abbot. In 1162 he was one of the papal commissioners for delivering the pall to Archbishop Thomas. He died 12 November 1191.

According to John Leland, he was the author of:

1. Exhortatio ad Sacras Virgines Godestovensis Cœnobii
2. De miraculo Eucharistiæ ad Rainaldum
3. Epistolæ

== Notes ==
Catholic Church titles
| Preceded by Roger | Abbot of Evesham; 1061- | Succeeded by Walter |
