= Nicola Paglia =

Blessed Nicola Paglia O.P.
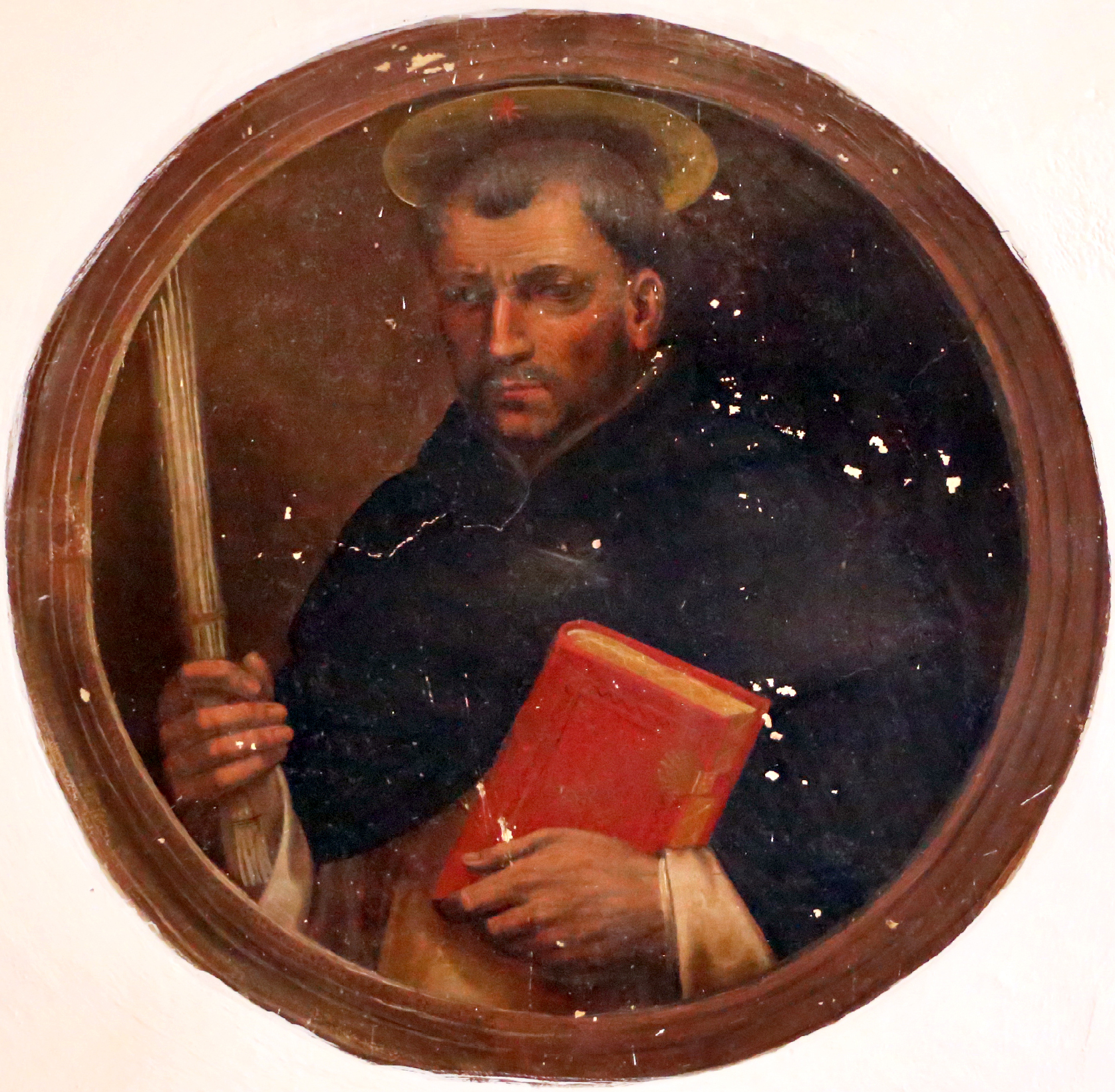
- Fresco by Niccolò Betti

Priest
- Born: 1197; Giovinazzo, Bari, Kingdom of Sicily
- Died: 16 February 1256 (aged 58); Perugia, Papal States
- Resting place: San Domenico, Perugia, Italy
- Venerated in: Roman Catholic Church
- Beatified: 26 March 1828, Saint Peter's Basilica, Papal States by Pope Leo XII
- Feast: 16 February
- Attributes: Dominican habit

Nicola Paglia, OP (1197 – 16 February 1256) was an Italian Catholic priest and member of the Order of Preachers. Paglia became a Dominican after hearing Saint Dominic preach in Bologna. Paglia exhibited exceptional pastoral zeal in his duties, which included serving as provincial of the Dominicans in Rome.

Paglia had popular devotion that endured in the centuries after his death and the confirmation of this devotion – or 'cultus' – allowed for Pope Leo XII to confirm the late priest's beatification on 26 March 1828.

== Life ==
Nicola Paglia was born in 1197 in Giovinazzo near Bari in Apulia to nobles. He was noted as being pious and studious in his childhood. In his childhood an angel appeared to him and ordered that he forever abstain from eating meat.

In 1217 he travelled to Bologna for the completion of his education where he heard Saint Dominic preach. Paglia was so moved by Dominic's sermon that as soon as Dominic exited the pulpit, he rushed over and asked him for immediate admission into the Order of Preachers. He later received his habit from Dominic himself. Paglia, during his novitiate, exhibited an exceptional determination to make great progress in his spiritual life towards God and was known to convert Jewish people to the Christian faith.

Paglia was later ordained as a priest and served two terms as provincial of the order's Roman province. He founded convents in Perugia, where he settled. Pope Gregory IX also commissioned him to visit several monasteries and to preach a crusade against the Saracens.

Near the end of his life, Paglia obtained permission to fade from his public and active pastoral career to prepare for his approaching death. Paglia died in Perugia at the beginning of 1256. He was interred there in the Church of San Domenico.

== Beatification ==
The confirmation of the late priest's local 'cultus' – or popular devotion – allowed for Pope Leo XII to approve of Paglia's beatification on 26 March 1828.
