= 1180s =

Decade

The 1180s was a decade of the Julian Calendar which began on January 1, 1180, and ended on December 31, 1189.

== Events ==
=== By place ===
==== Byzantine Empire ====
- September 24 – Emperor Manuel I Komnenos dies in Constantinople after a 37-year reign. He is succeeded by his 11-year-old son, Alexios II Komnenos, who will reign briefly as emperor of the Byzantine Empire under the regency of his mother, Maria of Antioch. Maria assumes power as regent (until 1183) and takes as her advisor and lover, Alexios Komnenos (protosebastos), a nephew of Manuel I, which causes scandal and unrest among the Byzantine populace.

==== Europe ====
- January 13 – Henry the Lion, Duke of Saxony and Bavaria, is stripped of his duchies and all his imperial fiefs at an Imperial Diet in Würzburg for violating the king's peace. On April 13, Emperor Frederick I Barbarossa issues the Gelnhausen Charter, formally dissolving Henry's former domains. A portion of Saxony is reorganized as the Duchy of Westphalia, while other territories are granted to his ally, Otto I the Redhead, Duke of Bavaria.
- September 18 – King Louis VII (called the Younger) dies in Paris after a 43-year reign. He is succeeded by his 15-year-old son, Philip II, who becomes sole ruler of France and reigns until 1223.
- Portuguese admiral Dom Fuas Roupinho defeats the Almohad fleet for the second time in two years.
- The assembly traditionally considered the first Sejm of the Kingdom of Poland is convened at Łęczyca (approximate date).

==== England ====
- The town of Portsmouth is founded by the Norman merchant Jean de Gisors, who establishes it as a strategic port to facilitate trade between England and France (approximate date).

==== Levant ====
- Summer – King Baldwin IV (known as "the Leper") sends envoys to Saladin proposing a peace treaty. Due to a severe drought, much of Syria is afflicted by famine, prompting Saladin to agree to a two-year truce. Although Raymond III of Tripoli initially denounces the agreement, he is forced to accept it following an Ayyubid naval raid on the port city of Tartus.
- Saladin intervenes in a conflict between the Zengids of Mosul and the Artuqids. He persuades the Seljuk sultanate of Rum not to become involved and proceeds to raid Cilician Armenia.
- Baldwin IV arranges the marriage of his sister, Sibylla, to Guy of Lusignan, brother of the constable Amalric of Lusignan. Baldwin grants Guy the County of Jaffa and Ascalon as a fief.

==== Asia ====
- March 18 – Emperor Takakura is forced to abdicate by Taira no Kiyomori after a 12-year reign. He is succeeded by his two-year-old son, Emperor Antoku, who will reign until 1185. Kiyomori assumes control of the government, ruling as regent in the child emperor's name.
- Genpei War: Prince Mochihito launches a rebellion against the ruling Taira clan. In support of the uprising, Minamoto no Yorimasa issues a call to arms, appealing to several Buddhist monasteries—such as Enryaku-ji, Mii-dera, and others—that have been alienated by Kiyomori.
- June 20 – Battle of Uji: Prince Mochihito and Minamoto no Yorimasa take refuge in the Byōdō-in Temple. They appeal to warrior monks for assistance, but are ultimately defeated by Taira forces. Yorimasa commits suicide, and Mochihito is killed while fleeing.
- September 14 – Battle of Ishibashiyama: A Taira force of approximately 3,000 men, led by Ōba Kagechika, defeats Minamoto no Yoritomo near Mount Fuji (in present-day Odawara). Yoritomo narrowly escapes by sea and flees to Awa Province.
- November 9 – Battle of Fujigawa: Minamoto forces, numbering around 30,000 and commanded by Minamoto no Yoritomo, defeat a Taira army under Taira no Koremori near the Fuji River. The Taira forces retreat in disorder, though Koremori manages to escape.

=== By topic ===
==== Culture ====
- Alexander Neckam becomes a lecturer in Paris and begins writing De Natura Rerum, one of the earliest Western European works to mention chess (approximate date).

==== Demography ====
- Hangzhou, the capital of the Southern Song dynasty in China, becomes the largest city in the world, surpassing Fez in the Almohad Caliphate.

=== Europe ===
- King Philip II (Augustus) annuls all loans made by Jews to Christians, and takes a percentage for himself. A year later, he confiscates all Jewish property and expels the Jews from Paris.
- Philip II begins a war against Philip of Alsace, count of Flanders, over the Vermandois. He claims the territory for his wife Isabella of Hainault as her dowry. Philip is unwilling to give it up.
- Henry the Lion, duke of Saxony, submits to Emperor Frederick I (Barbarossa) at an Imperial Diet in Erfurt. He is banished to England and retains only Brunswick among his former lands.
- King Béla III of Hungary and Croatia goes to war with Venice in an effort to recover Dalmatia. The city of Zadar (located on the Adriatic Sea) accepts Béla's suzerainty.
- After a series of defeats, the Almohad fleet under the admiral Ahmad al-Siqilli, crushes the Portuguese navy and reasserts its control over the Atlantic Ocean.
- The word Albigensians is first used by Geoffroy du Breuil of Vigeois, French abbot and chronicler, to describe the inhabitants of Albi in southern France.

==== Ireland ====
- King Henry II removes Hugh de Lacy, lord of Meath, from his position as procurator of Ireland, possibly because of his having married the daughter of High King Ruaidrí Ua Conchobair.

==== Levant ====
- Summer – Raynald of Châtillon, lord of Oultrejordain, raids Saladin's territory, reaching as far as Tabuk (modern Saudi Arabia) on the route between Damascus and Mecca. In November, Saladin sends an expedition under his nephew, Farrukh Shah, who invades Oultrejordain. Raynald of Châtillon is forced to withdraw home. Saladin complains to King Baldwin IV of Jerusalem (the Leper) for breaking the treaty (see 1180) and demands compensation.

==== Asia ====
- March 20 – Taira no Kiyomori, Japanese military leader and dictator, dies at Kyoto. He established the first samurai-dominated administrative government in Japan.
- Jayavarman VII defeats the Chams and assumes control over the Khmer Empire (modern Cambodia).
- The Yōwa era is marked by famine in Japan, during the period from July 1181 through May 1182.

=== By topic ===
==== Religion ====
- August 30 – Pope Alexander III dies after a 22-year pontificate at Rome. He is succeeded by the Tuscany-born Lucius III as the 171st pope of the Catholic Church.

==== Science ====
- January – William VIII of Montpellier frees the teaching of medicine from any monopoly in France, an origin of the University of Montpellier.
- Chinese and Japanese astronomers observe what has come to be understood as supernova SN 1181. One of only eight supernovae in the Milky Way observed in recorded history. It appears in the constellation Cassiopeia and is visible in the night sky for about 185 days. The radio source 3C58 was thought to be the remnant from this event, but opinion is shifting towards the recently discovered nebula Pa 30 (ref : Arxiv 2105.12384).

=== By place ===
==== Byzantine Empire ====
- April – Massacre of the Latins: The Eastern Orthodox inhabitants of Constantinople massacre the Venetian, Genoan, and other Latin officials and traders who rule as agents of Empress Maria of Antioch. She is the mother and regent of 12-year-old Emperor Alexios II.
- August – Andronikos Komnenos, a cousin of Maria's late husband, Emperor Manuel I (Komnenos), raises an army and enters the city, representing himself as the 'protector' of Alexios. He is proclaimed as co-emperor under the name Andronikos I, and has Maria imprisoned and later condemned to be strangled – forcing a signature from Alexios to put his mother to death.

==== Levant ====
- May 11 – Saladin leads an Egyptian expeditionary force from Cairo to Syria. In June, he arrives in Damascus and learns that his nephew Farrukh Shah has raided Galilee, and sacked the villages near Mount Tabor. On his way back, Farrukh Shah attacks the fortress of Habis Jaldak, carved out of the rock above the River Yarmuk. The garrison, Christian Syrians with no great wish to die for the Crusaders, promptly surrenders.
- July – August – Battle of Belvoir Castle: Saladin crosses into Palestine round the south of the Sea of Galilee. King Baldwin IV (the Leper) of Jerusalem marches with his army back from Oultrejordain and attacks Saladin's forces near Belvoir Castle (modern Israel). In a fierce battle, the Crusaders successfully repel Saladin's invasion. At the end of the day, each side retires, claiming the victory.
- August – Saladin sends an Egyptian fleet to blockade Beirut and leads his forces in the Bekaa Valley. The city is strongly fortified and Baldwin IV rushes with his army up from Galilee – only pausing to collect the ships that lay in the harbors of Acre and Tyre. Failing to take Beirut by assault before the Crusaders arrived, Saladin breaks off the siege and withdraws.
- September – Saladin invades the Jazira Region, ending the truce between him and the Zangids. After a feint attack on Aleppo, he crosses the Euphrates. The towns of the Jazira fall before him; the cities of Edessa, Saruj and Nisibin are captured in October. Saladin presses on to Mosul, and begins the siege of the city on November 10.
- November – Al-Nasir, caliph of the Abbasid Caliphate, is shocked by the war between fellow-Muslims and tries to negotiate a peace. Saladin, thwarted by the strong fortifications of Mosul, retreats to Sinjar. He marches to conquer Diarbekir, the richest and the greatest fortress of the Jazira Region (with the finest library in Islam).
- December – Baldwin IV raids through the Hauran and reaches Bosra, while Raymond III of Tripoli recaptures Habis Jaldak. A few days later, Baldwin sets out with a Crusader force to Damascus and encamps at Dareiya in the suburbs. He decides not to attack the city and retires laden with booty, to spend Christmas at Tyre.
- Winter – Raynald of Châtillon, lord of Oultrejordain, orders the building of five ships which are carried to the Gulf of Aqaba at the northern end of the Red Sea. Part of his fleet makes a raid along the coast, threatening the security of the holy cities on Pharaoh's Island (or Île de Graye).

==== Europe ====
- Spring – King Philip II (Augustus) confiscates all the lands and buildings of the Jews and expels them from Paris. The measures are profitable in the short-term – the ransoms alone bringing in 15,000 marks and enriching Christians at the expense of Jews. Ninety-nine Jews are burned alive in Brie-Comte-Robert.
- May 12 – King Valdemar I (the Great) dies after a 28-year reign in which he has gained independence from the Holy Roman Empire. He is succeeded by his 19-year-old son Canute VI, who becomes ruler of Denmark.
- Mieszko III (the Old), duke of Greater Poland, agrees with his son Odon of Poznań to divide the territories between them: Mieszko hold his western lands and Odon receives the eastern lands south of the River Obra.
- May – June – Béla III, king of Hungary, ravages the region of Belgrade and Barancs (modern-day Braničevo). Meanwhile, Serbia allies itself with Hungary to gain independence.
- September 14 – Legend of Nazaré: Dom Fuas Roupinho, alcalde of Porto de Mós, is inspired by a Marian miracle to erect the Sanctuary of Our Lady of Nazaré overlooking Nazaré, Portugal. Later this year while trying to enter the harbor of Ceuta by surprise to sink Muslim ships he is spotted and killed.
- A Sicilian attempt to dislodge the Moorish fleet from Mallorca fails.

==== England ====
- William Marshal, Norman knight and head of the household of Henry the Young King, is accused of having an affair with Henry's wife, Queen Margaret of France. Although contemporary chroniclers doubt the truth of these accusations. Henry starts the process to have his marriage annulled, William leaves the royal retinue, undergoing a period of self-imposed exile, and goes on a pilgrimage to Cologne.

==== Asia ====
- May – The Yōwa era, marked by famine, ends during the reign of Emperor Antoku in Japan.

=== By topic ===
==== Religion ====
- The Maronite Church reestablishes its affiliation with the Roman Catholic Church.

=== By area ===
==== Byzantine Empire ====
- Alexios II is compelled to condemn his own mother to death. In September, Andronikos Komenos is formally proclaimed Byzantine Emperor before the crowd on the terrace of the Church of Christ of the Chalke. By the end of the month, Andronikos orders Alexios' assassination; the young emperor is strangled in secret with a bow-string and his body thrown in the Bósporos.
- Andronikos I marries Alexios II's widow, the 11-year-old Agnes of France.
- November – Andronikos makes a treaty with Venice, in which he promises a yearly indemnity as compensation for Venetian losses, during the Massacre of the Latins.

==== Europe ====
- June 25 – The Peace of Constance is signed, between Frederick Barbarossa and the Lombard League, forming the legal basis for the autonomy of the Italian city republics.
- Joseph of Exeter writes the first account of a sport resembling cricket.

==== Asia ====
===== Japan =====
- Three-year-old Emperor Go-Toba ascends to the throne of Japan, after the forced abdication of his brother Emperor Antoku, during the Genpei War.
- August 14 – Taira no Munemori and the Taira clan take the young Emperor Antoku and the three sacred treasures, and flee to western Japan to escape pursuit by the Minamoto clan (traditional Japanese date: Twenty-fifth Day of the Seventh Month of the Second Year of Juei).
- November 17 – Battle of Mizushima: The Taira Clan defeats the Minamoto Clan.

===== Near East =====
- February – Raynald of Châtillon has at least five ships freighted over the Isthmus of Suez, which he then uses to pillage the shores of the Red Sea around Jeddah.
- William of Tyre is excommunicated by the newly appointed Heraclius of Jerusalem, firmly ending their struggle for power.
- The Siege of Kerak is waged between the Ayyubids and the Crusaders, in which regent Guy of Lusignan refuses to fight.
- Saladin conquers Syria and becomes sultan.

=== By place ===
==== Europe ====
- March 27 – Tamar I becomes queen regnant of Georgia on the death of her father and coregent George III. She remains sole ruler of Georgia (the first woman to hold this office) until her death in 1213.
- May 20 – Diet of Pentecost: Emperor Frederick Barbarossa, Holy Roman Emperor, organises a conference in Mainz. During the diet Frederick negotiates with Henry the Lion about an anti-French alliance with England.
- June 15 – Battle of Fimreite: King Sverre of Norway defeats and kills his rival, Magnus V (Erlingsson) near Fimreite. Sverre takes the throne and becomes sole ruler of Norway (until 1202).
- July 26 – Approximately 60 are killed in the Erfurt latrine disaster.
- Summer – Almohad forces reconquer the Alentejo (except for Évora), and besiege Lisbon on land and blockade the port with their navy. A Portuguese soldier manages to swim to the largest ship of the fleet and to sink it. This ship is so tall, it would have allowed the Muslims easily to reach the walls of the city. The next day, the Almohads have to retreat, though taking with them a number of civilian captives.
- Siege of Santarém: Almohad forces under Caliph Abu Yaqub Yusuf march towards Badajoz and besiege Santarém, which is defended by King Afonso I of Portugal ("the Conqueror"). Upon hearing of Abu Yusuf's attack, Ferdinand II of León marches his army to Santarém to support his father-in-law, Afonso. Abu Yusuf, in an attempt to break the siege, is wounded by a crossbow bolt and dies on July 29.
- October 29 – The 18-year-old Prince Henry, eldest surviving son of Frederick I, is engaged to Princess Constance, heiress to the Kingdom of Sicily, at Augsburg in the episcopal palace.
- The city of Abbeville receives its commercial charter by King Philip II of France.

==== England ====
- The first royal ordinance demanding that the Knights Templar and Hospitaller assist in the collection of taxes is promulgated.
- King Henry II of England encourages his youngest (and favorite) son John to seize Aquitaine from his brother Richard.
- May – A serious fire damages Glastonbury Abbey and destroys several buildings.

==== Africa ====
- May – Berber forces under Ali Banu Ghaniya seize the Almohad cities of Algiers, Béjaïa and Constantine by surprise. While he is away from his base in Mallorca, one of his brothers, Muhammad, takes control of the island and calls in the Almohads, who intend to capture Mallorca for themselves. Banu Ghaniya arrives just in time to defeat the Almohads and recapture the island.
- August 10 – Abu Yusuf Yaqub al-Mansur is proclaimed the new caliph of the Almohad Caliphate, after his father Abu Yaqub Yusuf is killed in Portugal.

==== Levant ====
- Saladin sends his nephew Izz al-Din Usama, governor (emir) of the iron-rich mountains near Beirut, to build Ajloun Castle, which controls the trade along the road between Damascus and Egypt.

==== Asia ====
- February 19 – Second Battle of Uji: Japanese forces under Minamoto no Yoshinaka are defeated by his cousins, Minamoto no Yoshitsune and Minamoto no Yoritomo, for the control of Japan.
- February 21 – Battle of Awazu: Minamoto no Yoshinaka is killed during a pursuit by his cousin's armies. He is joined by his foster brother Imai Kanehira, who commits suicide.
- March 20 – Battle of Ichi-no-Tani: Japanese forces under Minamoto no Noriyori defeat the Taira clan at Ikuta Shrine in the woods of Settsu Province during the Genpei War.

=== By topic ===
==== Religion ====
- The papal bull Ad Abolendam is issued against several European heretical groups: the Cathars, the Waldensians, the Patarines, Josephines and the Humiliati. It is created after a landmark meeting in Verona, between the Holy Roman Empire under Frederick I and the Catholic Church under Pope Lucius III.

=== By place ===
==== Byzantine Empire ====
- August – King William II of Sicily ("the Good") lands in Epirus with a Siculo-Norman expeditionary force of 200 ships and 80,000 men (including 5,000 knights) and marches as far as the Byzantine city of Thessaloniki, which he takes and pillages, massacring some 7,000 Greek citizens.
- September 11–12 – Isaac II Angelos leads a revolt in Constantinople and deposes Emperor Andronikos I Komnenos. Andronikos tries in vain to flee across Asia but is captured and killed by an angry mob. Isaac is proclaimed emperor, ending the Komnenos Dynasty.
- November 7 – Battle of Demetritzes: A reinforced Byzantine army under Alexios Branas decisively defeats William II, ending his invasion of the Byzantine Empire. Thessaloniki is recaptured, and the Normans are pushed back to Italy. Many Norman ships are lost to storms.
- Uprising of Asen and Peter: Peter and Ivan Asen lead a revolt of the Vlachs and Bulgars against the Byzantine Empire, eventually establishing the Second Bulgarian Empire.

==== Levant ====
- March 16 – The 23-year-old Baldwin IV of Jerusalem ("the Leper King") dies of leprosy after a 10-year reign. He is succeeded by his 8-year-old nephew, Baldwin V, as the sole ruler of Jerusalem under the regency of Count Raymond of Tripoli. The child-king becomes a pawn in the politics of the kingdom, between his mother Sibylla of Jerusalem (sister of Baldwin IV) and her younger half-sister Isabella I.
- Saladin agrees to a 4-year truce due to severe drought and famine which has struck Palestine. The treaty is signed by Count Raymond of Tripoli and important nobles from Jerusalem. Commerce is renewed between the Crusader States and their Muslim neighbors. A flow of corn from the east saves the Crusaders and the population from starvation.

==== British Isles ====
- April 25 – John's first expedition to Ireland: King Henry II of England knights his son and heir, the 18-year-old Prince John, newly created Lord of Ireland, and sends him to Ireland, accompanied by 300 knights and a team of administrators to enforce English control. Landing at Waterford, he treats the local Irish rulers with contempt, making fun of their unfashionable long beards. Also failing to make allies amongst the Anglo-Norman settlers, the English army is unable to subdue the Irish fighters in unfamiliar conditions and the expedition soon becomes a complete disaster. In December, John returns to England in defeat. Nonetheless, Henry gets him named 'King of Ireland' by Pope Urban III and procures a golden crown with peacock feathers.
- April 15 – 1185 East Midlands earthquake occurs. It is the first earthquake in England for which there are reliable reports indicating the damage, which includes destruction of Lincoln Cathedral.

==== Europe ====
- July – Treaty of Boves: King Philip II of France signs a treaty to ensure his authority over his vassals, with Amiénois, Artois and other places in northern France passing to him. Philip is given the nickname "Augustus" by the monk Rigord for augmenting French lands.
- August 15 – The cave monastery of Vardzia is consecrated by Queen Tamar I of Georgia. She marries Yury Bogolyubsky, Grand Prince of Novgorod.
- September – Henry the Lion, duke of Saxony, returns to Germany after being banished for three years by Frederick Barbarossa, Holy Roman Emperor.
- December 6 – King Afonso I of Portugal ("the Great") dies after a 36-year reign. He is succeeded by his son Sancho I ("the Populator") as ruler of Portugal.
- Igor Svyatoslavich's failed campaign against the Cumans, later immortalized in The Tale of Igor's Campaign, takes place this year.

==== Africa ====
- The Almohad forces under Caliph Yaqub al-Mansur reconquer Béjaïa and Algiers, that have been taken by the Banu Ghaniya, descendants of the Almoravids.

==== Asia ====
- March 22 – Battle of Yashima: Japanese forces (with some 140 ships, 1,000 cavalry and 30,000 horses) under Minamoto no Yoshitsune defeat the Taira clan just off Shikoku in the Seto Inland Sea.
- April 25 – Battle of Dan-no-Ura: The Japanese fleet (some 300 ships) led by Minamoto no Yoshitsune defeats the fleet of the Taira clan in the Shimonoseki Strait.
- December – Retired Emperor Go-Shirakawa grants Minamoto no Yoritomo the authority to form the first bakufu (shogunate) in Japan, ending the Genpei War.

=== By topic ===
==== Astronomy ====
- May 1 – The Solar eclipse of 1 May 1185, visible across Central America, Northern and Eastern Europe and Kazakhstan, occurs.

==== Markets ====
- Evidence is first uncovered that Henry II of England is using the safes of the Temple Church in London (consecrated February 10), under the guard of the Knights Templar, to store part of his treasure.

==== Religion ====
- November 25 – Pope Lucius III dies after a 4-year pontificate in exile at Verona. He is succeeded by Urban III as the 172nd pope of the Catholic Church (until 1187).

=== 1186 ===
- January 27 – Constance of Sicily marries Henry (the future Henry VI, Holy Roman Emperor).
- John the Chanter becomes Bishop of Exeter.
- The Byzantine Empire recognizes the independence of Bulgaria and Serbia.
- Joscius becomes Archbishop of Tyre.
- Jayavarman VII, the king of Cambodia, founds the temple of Ta Prohm.
- After the death of the child-king Baldwin V, his mother succeeds him as Sibylla of Jerusalem, and appoints her disfavoured husband Guy de Lusignan king consort. This comes as a shock to Jerusalem's court, who had earlier forced the possible future Queen into promising that should she become so, she would not appoint him the title.
- The first nunnery is inaugurated in Iceland, the Kirkjubæjar Abbey.

=== By place ===
==== Byzantine Empire ====
- Spring – Emperor Isaac II (Angelos) sends a Byzantine expeditionary force under Alexios Branas to suppress the Vlach-Bulgarian Rebellion – but Alexios revolts against Isaac and is proclaimed emperor in Andrianople. He musters troops and advances on Constantinople in an attempt to seize it. However, Alexios is unable to bypass the city defenses and is defeated by the imperial forces led by Conrad of Montferrat, the emperor's brother-in-law. On the battlefield, Alexios is beheaded by Conrad's supporting footsoldiers and the rebel army flees the field.
- Siege of Lovech: Byzantine forces under Isaac II besiege the fortress city of Lovech in north-central Bulgaria. After a three-month siege, Isaac is forced to accept a truce by recognizing the joint-rule of Peter II and Ivan Asen I as emperor's (or tsar) over the territory, leading to the creation of the Second Bulgarian Empire (until 1396).

==== Levant ====
- Spring – The Crusaders under Raynald of Châtillon attack a large Muslim caravan, including members of Saladin's family, journeying from Cairo. Raynald takes the merchants, and their families with all their possessions to his castle of Kerak. Saladin demands the release of the prisoners and compensation for their losses. This is refused by Raynald, who pays no attention to his order.
- March 13 – Saladin leaves Damascus with his Muslim forces, and sends letters to neighboring countries, asking for volunteers for a forthcoming jihad ("Holy War"). A week later his younger brother Al-Adil, governor of Egypt, leads his forces out of Cairo towards Syria. Meanwhile, Saladin leaves an army under his 18-year-old son Al-Afdal at Busra, to keep watch on the 'Pilgrim road'.
- April – King Guy of Lusignan summons his vassals and marches north to Nazareth, to reduce Galilee to submission.
- April 29 – A delegation under Balian of Ibelin is sent to Tiberias, to reconcile with Raymond III, prince of Galilee. After Easter, a second delegation (supported by the Knights Templar and Knights Hospitaller) is sent to Tripoli, but the situation remains unchanged.
- May 1 – Battle of Cresson: A Muslim reconnaissance force (some 7,000 men) under Muzaffar al-Din Gökböri, defeats a small Crusader army near Nazareth. Only Gerard de Ridefort, commander of the Crusaders, and a handful of knights escape death or capture. The Muslims scatter and kill the Christian foot-soldiers (some 400 men) before pillaging the countryside.
- June 26 – Saladin regroups his Muslim forces and marches towards the Jordan River. His army numbers around 30,000 men and is divided into three columns. The following day Saladin encamps on the Golan Heights, in a marshy area near Lake Tiberias. Raiding parties are sent across the Jordan to ravage Christian territory between Nazareth, Tiberias, and Mount Tabor.
- June 30 – Saladin sends a contingent to block Tiberias and challenges the Crusaders by moving his main camp closer to Saffuriya – some 10 km west of Lake Tiberias. On July 1, he sends scouts to monitor an alternative road on his northern flank that connects Saffuriya and Tiberias. The following day he attacks Tiberias with a part of his forces, including siege equipment.
- July 2–3 – Saladin besieges Tiberias. The defenders, and Countess Eschiva II (wife of Raymond III) retreat to the citadel and sends messengers urging Guy of Lusignan to send help. Meanwhile, Guy and Raymond hold a war council to debate what should be done. Persuaded by Gerard de Ridefort and Raynald of Châtillon, Guy orders to march to the rescue of Tiberias.

==== Egypt ====
- July 4 – Battle of Hattin: Egyptian army under Saladin defeats the Crusader army (some 20,000 men) under Guy of Lusignan at the Horns of Hattin. Guy is captured along with many nobles and knights, among them, Raynald of Châtillon. The latter is executed by Saladin himself. The Crusader States have no reserves to defend the castles and fortified settlements against Saladin's forces.
- July 14 – Conrad of Montferrat, an Italian nobleman, arrives in Tyre which ends the surrender negotiations with Saladin. He finds the remnants of the Crusader army (after the battle of Hattin) and makes the Tyrians swear loyalty to him. Reginald of Sidon and several other nobles give their support, Reginald goes to refortify his own castle of Beaufort on the Litani River.
- Summer – Egyptian troops led by Saladin begins a campaign that paves the way for further Muslim inroads into Christian territory. Al-Adil invades Palestine with the Egyptian army, and captures the strategic castle of Mirabel (Majdal Yaba). By mid-September, Saladin has captured the cities of Acre, Jaffa, Gaza and Ascalon (blockaded by the Egyptian fleet), along with some 50 Crusader castles.
- September 20–October 2 – Siege of Jerusalem: Egyptian army under Saladin captures Jerusalem, after the Crusaders led by Balian of Ibelin surrender the 'Holy City'. The take-over of the city is relatively peaceful; Saladin agrees to let the Muslims and Christians leave the city, taking with them their goods. Balian joins his wife Maria Komnene and family, in the County of Tripoli.

==== Europe ====
- Summer – Pillage of Sigtuna: A fleet of Karelians enters Lake Malar and ravages the coast. The marauders burn Sigtuna and kill Archbishop Johannes at Almarestäket in Sweden.
- Genoa takes Bonifacio (in Corsica) from Pisa. Pope Gregory VIII reconciles the differences between the states so that both may be used to expedite shipments to the Holy Land.

==== Britain ====
- November – Richard of Poitou, son of King Henry II, take the Cross to help capture Jerusalem from the Muslims. He empties his coffers for the mission and makes a deal with King William the Lion of Scotland, giving him full feudal autonomy in return for cash.

==== Africa ====
- Almohad forces under Caliph Abu Yusuf Yaqub al-Mansur reconquer the city of Gabès (modern Tunisia) from the Almoravid pretender, Ali Banu Ghaniya.

==== Asia ====
- November 9 – Retired-Emperor Gao Zong dies at the age of 80, having abdicated 58 years ago (see 1129) after a reign in which he reestablished the Southern Song dynasty (until 1279).

=== By topic ===
==== Economy ====
- Orio Mastropiero, doge of Venice, secures loans from the Venetian nobility to finance the siege of Zadar. Pledging the income from the Salt Office becomes a staple of the city's finance.

==== Religion ====
- October 20 – Pope Urban III dies after a 2½-year pontificate at Ferrara. He is succeeded by Gregory VIII as the 173rd pope of the Catholic Church.
- October – Josias, archbishop of Tyre, arrives in Rome and informs the Papal Court of the disaster of the Christian slaughter at Hattin by Saladin.
- October 29 – Gregory VIII issues the bull Audita tremendi, proposing the Third Crusade and negotiates with Emperor Frederick I (Barbarossa).
- December 17 – Gregory VIII dies after holding the papacy for only 57 days. He is succeeded by Clement III as the 174th pope of Rome.

=== By place ===
==== Europe ====
- January 22 – King Ferdinand II dies after returning from a pilgrimage to Santiago de Compostela. He is succeeded by his 16-year-old son Alfonso IX, who becomes ruler of León and Galicia. He convenes representatives of the nobility, clergy and towns at the Basilica of San Isidoro the Cortes of León. These Corteses are considered to be the first parliament in Europe.
- Spring – King Henry II and Philip II (Augustus) meet at Le Mans, with Archbishop Josias (or Joscius) in attendance. Both kings agree to peace terms, and to contribute to a joint Crusade. It is decided to raise a new tax to pay for the expedition. This tax, known as the Saladin Tithe, is imposed on the people of England and France to raise funds for the Third Crusade.
- March 27 – Emperor Frederick I (Barbarossa) holds a Diet at Mainz and takes the Cross, followed by his 21-year-old son, Frederick IV, and other German nobles. He sends a delegation to present an ultimatum to Saladin in Syria on May 26. With demands to withdraw his Muslim forces from Palestina and to return the True Cross to the Church of the Holy Sepulchre.
- November – Richard of Poitou, son of Henry II, allies himself with Philip II and pays him homage. He promises to concede his rights to both Normandy and Anjou. Henry is overpowered by Richard's supporters, who chase him from Le Mans to Angers. They force him to accept peace by conceding to all demands, including the recognition of Richard as his successor.
- The Cutting of the Elm: A meeting of Henry II and Philip II in the field at Gisors, in Normandy. It marks the Franco-Norman peace negotiations, following the Fall of Jerusalem (see 1187).

==== Levant ====
- Spring – Siege of Tyre: Muslim forces under Saladin withdraw from Tyre after a 1½-month siege. For the Crusaders, the city-port becomes a strategic rallying point for the Christian revival during the Third Crusade.
- May 14 – Saladin begins a campaign and marches north but finds Tripoli too strong to be besieged. He decides to take other Crusader fortifications and signs an 8-month truce with Prince Bohemond III of Antioch.
- May – Saladin besieges the Hospitaller fortress of Krak des Chevaliers, in Syria. Seeing that the castle is too well defended, instead he decides to march on the Castle of Margat, which he also fails to capture.
- July – Saladin marches through the Buqaia, and occupies Jabala and Lattakieh. From Lattakieh he turns inland and, after a few days of fierce fighting, takes Sahyun Castle (called Castle of Saladin) on July 29.
- September 4 – King Guy of Lusignan is released by Saladin after Ascalon is forced to surrender. Guy and his wife, Queen Sibylla of Jerusalem, seek refuge in Tyre, which is defended by Conrad of Montferrat.

==== England ====
- Spring – Henry II institutes legal reforms that give the Crown more control over the administration of justice. He orders Newgate Prison be built in London.
- Archdeacon Giraldus Cambrensis and Archbishop Baldwin of Forde travel through Wales, attempting to recruit men for the Third Crusade.

=== By place ===
==== Continental Europe ====
- May 11 – Emperor Frederick I (Barbarossa) sets out from Regensburg, at the head of a German expeditionary force (some 15,000 men, including 4,000 knights). He has ensured that his lands are safe while he is away on crusade and leaves his son Henry VI in charge of the country. After leaving Germany, Frederick's army is increased by a contingent of 2,000 men led by Prince Géza, younger brother of King Béla III of Hungary. On July 27, he arrives at Niš and is welcomed by Stefan Nemanja, Grand Prince of Serbia. In order to ease his passage, Frederick makes diplomatic contacts with Hungary, the Byzantine Empire and the Seljuk Sultanate of Rum.
- July 6 – King Henry II of England ("Curtmantle") dies at the Château de Chinon, near Tours, after doing homage to Philip II (Augustus), and surrendering the territories around Issoudun in the Centre-Val de Loire. He ends the hostilities against Philip, by agreeing to the peace terms and pays him 20,000 marks in tribute. Henry is succeeded by his son, Richard I ("the Lionheart"), as ruler of England and his remaining territories in France.
- August – Byzantine Emperor Isaac II Angelos denies any crusader access and begins to hinder the German forces who try to cross his frontier. Frederick I progresses with force, by capturing Philippopolis and defeats a Byzantine army (some 3,000 men) that attempts to recapture the city. The Germans are delayed for six months in Thrace.
- August 29 – Ban Kulin, Bosnian ruler, writes the Charter of Ban Kulin, which becomes a symbolic "birth certificate" of Bosnian language and statehood.
- Reconquista: King Sancho I of Portugal ("the Populator") turns his attention towards the Moorish small kingdoms (called taifas) and begins a campaign in the south of his kingdom. With the help of crusader forces he conquers the town of Silves. He orders the fortification of the city, builds a castle and styles himself "King of Silves".
- November 11 – King William II of Sicily ("the Good"), having made peace with Emperor Isaac II and abandoned Thessalonika and other conquests, dies childless at Palermo. The Sicilian nobles elect Tancred of Lecce (illegitimate son of Roger II) as the new ruler of Sicily, instead of Princess Constance and her husband Henry VI, to avoid German rule.
- Frederick I grants Hamburg the status of a free imperial city and tax-free access (or free-trade zone) up the Lower Elbe into the North Sea. He also grants the right to fish, to cut trees and the freedom of military service.

==== Britain ====
- August – William Marshal marries the 17-year-old Isabel de Clare (daughter of Richard de Clare). Through this marriage, he becomes 1st Earl of Pembroke, acquiring huge estates in England, Normandy, Wales and Ireland.
- September 3 – Richard I is crowned king of England in Westminster Abbey. During the coronation, a number of notable Jews are expelled from the banquet and rumours spread that Richard has ordered a massacre of the Jews. This causes an actual massacre of the Jews in London; among those killed is Jacob of Orléans, a respected French Jewish scholar.
- December 5 – King William I ("the Lion") of Scotland gives Richard I 10,000 marks to buy his kingdom's independence. This overturns the Treaty of Falaise which William had to sign when he was captured in 1174.
- December – Richard I sets sail with a crusader army from Dover Castle to France. To ensure he has the allegiance of his brother John, Richard approves of his marriage to their cousin Isabella of Gloucester.
- Winter – John awards land to Bertram de Verdun, a Norman nobleman, and grants Dundalk its charter with town privileges; it becomes a strategic Anglo-Norman stronghold in Ireland.

==== Levant ====
- May – Saladin has reconquered the Crusader Kingdom of Jerusalem except for Tyre. The castles of Montréal and Kerak are captured by Muslim forces. In the north, Saladin has regained the Principality of Antioch except for Antioch and the castle of Al-Qusayr in Syria.
- August 28 – Siege of Acre: King Guy of Lusignan moves from Tyre, where Conrad of Montferrat refuses to hand over the city. Guy and his crusader army (some 7,000 men, including 400 knights) besiege Acre. He makes camp outside, to wait for more reinforcements.
- September – Guy of Lusignan receives reinforcements of some 12,000 men from Denmark, Germany, England, France, and Flanders. He encircles Acre with a double line of fortified positions. On September 15, Saladin launches a failed attack on Guy's camp.
- October 4 – Guy of Lusignan leads the crusader forces to launch a full-on assault on Saladin's camp. With heavy casualties on both sides, neither force gains the upperhand. On October 26, Saladin moves his camp from Acre to Mount Carmel (modern Israel).
- October 30 – An Egyptian fleet (some 50 ships) breaks through the crusader blockade at Acre and reinforces the port-city with some 10,000 men, as well as food and weapons.
- December – An Egyptian fleet reopens communications with Acre. The rest of the winter passes without major incidents, but the supply situation is poor in the besieged city.

==== Asia ====
- February 18 – Emperor Xiaozong abdicates in favour of his son Guangzong as ruler of the Song dynasty. Xiaozong becomes a Taishang Huang ("Retired Emperor") and remains as the de facto ruler of China.

== Significant people ==
- Philip II, King of France (1165 - 1223)
- Saladin (c.1137 - 1193)
- Richard I, King of England (1157 - 1199)
- Baldwin IV, King of Jerusalem (1161 - 1185)
- Frederick Barbarossa (1122 - 1190)
- Raymond III of Tripoli (1140 - 1187)
- Raynald of Châtillon (1125 - 1187)
- Tamar, Queen of Georgia (c.1160 - 1213)
- Minamoto no Yoritomo (1147 - 1199)
- Isaac II Angelos (1156 - 1204)

== Births ==
1180

- August 6 – Go-Toba, emperor of Japan (d. 1239)
- Alfonso II (Berenguer), count of Provence (d. 1209)
- Berengaria (the Great), queen of Castile and León (d. 1246)
- Eric X (Knutsson), king of Sweden (approximate date)
- Fernán Gutiérrez de Castro, Spanish nobleman (d. 1223)
- Gilbert de Clare, English nobleman (approximate date)
- Guala de Roniis, Italian priest and bishop (d. 1244)
- Hawise of Chester, English noblewoman (d. 1143)
- Ibn Abi Tayyi, Syrian historian and poet (d. 1228)
- Kambar, Indian Hindu poet and writer (d. 1250)
- Paulus Hungarus, Hungarian theologian (d. 1241)
- Philip of Ibelin, Cypriot nobleman and regent (d. 1227)
- Raimbaut de Vaqueiras, French troubadour (d. 1207)
- Robert de Bingham, bishop of Salisbury (d. 1246)
- Robert of Burgate, English nobleman (d. 1220)
- Simon of Dammartin, French nobleman (d. 1239)

1181

- March 22 – Ibn al-Farid, Arab poet and writer (d. 1234)
- June 21 – Huijong, Korean ruler of Goryeo (d. 1237)
- Irene Angelina, queen of Germany and Sicily (d. 1208)
- Marino Morosini, doge of Venice (House of Morosini) (d. 1253)
- Mathilde of Angoulême, French noblewoman (d. 1233)
- Xian Zong, Chinese emperor of Western Xia (d. 1226)

1182

- September 11 – Minamoto no Yoriie, Japanese shogun (d. 1204)
- September 19 – Reginald de Braose, Norman nobleman (d. 1228)
- Alexios I (Megas Komnenos), emperor of Trebizond (d. 1222)
- Alexios IV (Angelos), Byzantine emperor (approximate date)
- Alice of Vergy, duchess and regent of Burgundy (d. 1251)
- Bouchard IV, French nobleman (House of Avesnes) (d. 1244)
- Eleanor of Aragon, Spanish princess and countess (d. 1226)
- Enguerrand III, French nobleman (House of Coucy) (d. 1242)
- Francis of Assisi, founder of the Franciscan Order (d. 1226)
- Fujiwara no Tomoie, Japanese nobleman and poet (d. 1258)
- Jochi, Mongol general and son of Genghis Khan
- Lutgardis (or Lutgarde), Flemish nun and saint (d. 1246)
- Maria of Montpellier, queen consort of Aragon (d. 1213)
- Sakya Pandita, Tibetan Buddhist leader (d. 1251)
- Verdiana, Italian noblewoman and saint (d. 1242)

1183

- Chagatai Khan, second son of Genghis Khan, Khan of the Chagatai Khanate (d. 1241 or 1242)
- Philippa of Armenia, empress consort of Nicaea

1184

- April 11 – William Longsword, lord of Lüneburg (d. 1213)
- Ahmad al-Tifashi, Almohad poet and anthologist (d. 1253)
- Eleanor, Fair Maid of Brittany, English countess (d. 1241)
- Fujiwara no Hideyoshi, Japanese nobleman (d. 1240)
- Guigues VI, count of Albon (House of Burgundy) (d. 1237)
- Jutta of Thuringia, margravine of Meissen (d. 1235)
- William of Modena, Italian bishop and diplomat (d. 1251)

1185

- April 23 – Afonso II ("the Fat"), king of Portugal (d. 1223)
- Alexander of Hales, English philosopher (d. 1245)
- Angelus of Jerusalem, Israeli priest and martyr (d. 1220)
- Dietrich V, German nobleman (approximate date)
- Engelbert II, archbishop of Cologne (approximate date)
- Fujiwara no Reishi, Japanese empress consort (d. 1243)
- Gerard III, count of Guelders and Zutphen (d. 1229)
- Gertrude of Merania, queen of Hungary (d. 1213)
- Inge II (Bårdsson), king of Norway (d. 1217)
- Michael of Chernigov, Kievan Grand Prince (d. 1246)
- Patrick II, Earl of Dunbar, Anglo-Scottish nobleman (d. 1249)
- Raymond Roger Trencavel, French nobleman (d. 1209)
- Robert III, count of Dreux and Braine (d. 1234)
- Shams Tabrizi, Persian poet and writer (d. 1248)
- Tancred of Siena, Italian missionary (d. 1241)

1186

- May 18 – Konstantin of Rostov, Prince of Novgorod (d. 1218)
- November 7 – Ögedei Khan, third son and successor of Genghis Khan (d. 1241)
- date unknown or approximate
  - Checheyigen, second daughter of Genghis Khan (d. after 1253)
  - Queen Urraca of Portugal, wife of King Afonso II of Portugal (d. 1220)
  - Song Ci, Chinese physician and judge (d. 1249)
  - William III of Sicily (d. 1198)

1187

- February 23 – Peter I (Pedro), count of Urgell (d. 1258)
- March 29 – Arthur I (or Arzhur), duke of Brittany (d. 1203)
- July 29 – Ibn Abi'l-Dam, Syrian historian and judge (d. 1244)
- September 5 – Louis VIII (the Lion), French king (d. 1226)
- Ela of Salisbury, 3rd countess of Salisbury (d. 1261)
- Gundisalvus of Amarante, Portuguese priest (d. 1259)
- Hassan III, ruler of the Nizari Ismaili State (d. 1221)
- Ibn 'Adlan, Ayyubid cryptologist and poet (d. 1268)
- Koga Michiteru, Japanese nobleman and poet (d. 1248)
- Liu Kezhuang, Chinese poet and literary critic (d. 1269)
- Peter I (Mauclerc), duke and regent of Brittany (d. 1250)
- Vladimir IV (Rurikovich), Kievan Grand Prince (d. 1239)

1188

- March 4 – Blanche of Castile, queen and regent of France (d. 1252)
- March 24 – Ferdinand (or Ferrand), count of Flanders (d. 1233)
- November 26 – Yuri II of Vladimir, Kievan Grand Prince (d. 1238)
- Albert IV (the Wise), German nobleman and knight (d. 1239)
- Matilda I, countess of Nevers, Auxerre and Tonnerre (d. 1257)
- Si Inthrathit, Thai founder of the Sukhothai Kingdom (d. 1270)

1189

- Al-Mansur Nasir al-Din Muhammad, Ayyubid sultan (d. 1217)
- Archambaud VIII ("the Great"), Bourbon nobleman (d. 1242)
- Ferdinand of Castile, Spanish prince (infante) (d. 1211)
- Pietro Pettinaio, Italian comb-maker and saint (d. 1289)
- Peter Nolasco, French religious leader (d. 1256)
- Skule Bårdsson, Norwegian nobleman (d. 1240)
- Sukaphaa, founder of the Ahom kingdom in Assam (d. 1268)

== Deaths ==
1180

- January 23 – Eberhard I, count of Berg-Altena (b. 1140)
- January 29 – Soběslav II, duke of Bohemia (b. 1128)
- February 6 – Teresa Fernández de Traba, queen of León
- March 27 – Al-Mustadi, caliph of the Abbasid Caliphate (b. 1142)
- June 20
  - Minamoto no Yorimasa, Japanese military leader (b. 1106)
  - Mochihito, Japanese prince and son of Go-Shirakawa
- June 27 – Turan-Shah, Ayyubid emir (prince) of Damascus
- July 1 – Stephanie (the Unfortunate), Spanish noblewoman
- August 11 – William of Sens (or Guillaume), French architect
- September 18 – Louis VII (the Younger), king of France (b. 1120)
- September 24 – Manuel I (Komnenos), Byzantine emperor (b. 1118)
- October 6 – Amalric of Nesle, French prelate and Latin patriarch
- October 25 – John of Salisbury, English philosopher and bishop
- November 14 – Lorcán Ua Tuathail, Irish archbishop (b. 1128)
- Abraham ibn Daud, Spanish-Jewish philosopher (b. 1110)
- Abū Ṭāhir al-Silafī, Fatimid scholar and writer (b. 1079)
- John Tzetzes, Byzantine poet and grammarian (b. 1110)
- Joscelin of Louvain, Flemish nobleman (b. 1121)
- Raynerius of Split, Italian monk and archbishop
- Zhu Shuzhen, Chinese poet and writer (b. 1135)

1181

- January 30 – Takakura, emperor of Japan (b. 1161)
- March 16 – Henry I (the Liberal), French nobleman (b. 1127)
- March 20 – Taira no Kiyomori, Japanese military leader (b. 1118)
- March 13 – Simon III de Montfort, French nobleman (b. 1117)
- April 1 – Ulrich II von Treven, patriarch of Aquileia
- April 5 – Ramon Berenguer III, count of Provence
- June 30 – Hugh de Kevelioc, English politician (b. 1147)
- August 30 – Alexander III, pope of the Catholic Church
- September 27 – Guichard of Pontigny, French archbishop
- October 4 – Herman II, German nobleman (House of Sponheim)
- October 23 – Adela of Meissen, queen consort of Denmark
- November 26 – Roger de Pont L'Évêque, Norman archbishop
- December 3 – Galgano Guidotti, Italian nobleman (b. 1148)
- Adam the Welshman, Welsh theologian and bishop (b. 1130)
- As-Salih Ismail al-Malik, Zangid ruler of Damascus (b. 1163)
- Lucas (or Luke), archbishop of Esztergom (b. 1120)
- Serlo of Wilton, English poet and writer (b. 1105)
- Zhang Shi, Chinese Confucian scholar (b. 1133)

1182

- January 13 – Agnes of Austria, queen of Hungary (b. 1154)
- May 12 – Valdemar I (the Great), king of Denmark (b. 1131)
- May 16 – John Komnenos Vatatzes, Byzantine general
- July – Maria Komnene, Byzantine princess (poisoned) (b. 1152)
- July – Renier of Montferrat (the Caesar John), Italian husband of Maria Komnene (poisoned) (b. 1162)
- July 25 – Maria I, countess of Boulogne (b. 1136)
- August 1 – Pietro da Pavia, Italian cardinal-bishop
- September 15 – Robert III, Italo-Norman nobleman
- October 6 – Richard Peche, bishop of Coventry
- Ahmed-Al-Kabeer, Arab preacher and teacher (b. 1119)
- Farrukh Shah, Ayyubid ruler and nephew of Saladin
- Fujiwara no Kiyoko, Japanese empress (b. 1122)
- Henry I, count of Guelders and Zutphen (b. 1117)
- Hugo Etherianus, Italian cardinal and adviser (b. 1115)
- Cyril of Turov (or Kirill), Russian bishop (b. 1130)
- Maria of Antioch, Byzantine empress (b. 1145)
- Sonam Tsemo, Tibetan Buddhist leader (b. 1142)
- Zhao Boju, Chinese landscape painter (b. 1120)

1183

- June 11 – Henry the Young King, son of Henry II of England (b. 1155)
- October – Alexios II Komnenos, Byzantine Emperor (b. 1167)
- November 23 – William Fitz Robert, 2nd Earl of Gloucester (b. 1116)
- Queen Gongye, Korean queen consort (b. 1109)

1184

- January 2 – Theodora Komnene, duchess of Austria
- January 13 – Gerard la Pucelle, English bishop (b. 1117)
- February 16 – Richard of Dover, English archbishop
- February 21
  - Imai Kanehira, Japanese military leader (b. 1152)
  - Minamoto no Yoshinaka, Japanese shogun (b. 1154)
- March 27 – George III, king of Georgia (House of Bagrationi)
- March 28 – Eckbert of Schönau (or Egbert), German Benedictine abbot
- June 15 – Magnus V (Erlingsson), king of Norway (b. 1156)
- July 29 – Abu Yaqub Yusuf, Almohad caliph (emir) (b. 1135)
- September 30 – Arnold of Torroja, Catalan Grand Master
- October 24 – Siegfried, prince-archbishop of Bremen (b. 1132)
- November 15
  - Beatrice I, Countess of Burgundy, Holy Roman Empress consort (b. 1143)
  - William de Beaumont, 3rd Earl of Warwick, English nobleman
- November 18 – Josceline de Bohon, English bishop (b. 1111)
- December 17 – Simon de Tosny, Norman-Scottish bishop
- December 29 – Aindréas of Caithness, Gaelic-Scottish monk and bishop
- Abu al-Bayan ibn al-Mudawwar, Jewish physician (b. 1101)
- Agnes of Antioch, queen consort of Hungary (approximate date)
- Grimaldo Canella, Italian nobleman (House of Grimaldi)
- Li Tao (or Renfu), Chinese historian and writer (b. 1115)
- Pedro Fernández de Castro (Grand Master of the Order of Santiago), Spanish nobleman (b. 1115)
- Sasaki Hideyoshi, Japanese nobleman and samurai (b. 1112)
- Taira no Atsumori, Japanese warrior and samurai (b. 1169)
- Taira no Koremori, Japanese nobleman (approximate date)
- Taira no Tadanori, Japanese warrior and general (b. 1144)
- William de Vesci, High Sheriff of Northumberland (b. 1125)

1185

- February 9 – Theodoric I, margrave of Lusatia (b. 1130)
- March 16 – Baldwin IV ("the Leper King"), king of Jerusalem (b. 1161)
- March 22 – Satō Tsugunobu, Japanese warrior (b. 1158)
- April 25 – Battle of Dan-no-Ura:
  - Antoku, child-emperor of Japan (b. 1178)
  - Taira no Tokiko, Japanese Buddhist nun (b. 1126)
  - Taira no Norimori, Japanese nobleman (b. 1128)
  - Taira no Noritsune, Japanese nobleman (b. 1160)
  - Taira no Tomomori, Japanese nobleman (b. 1152)
  - Taira no Tsunemori, Japanese nobleman (b. 1124)
- June 16 – Richeza of Poland, queen consort of Castile (b. 1140)
- May 30 – Constantine Makrodoukas, Byzantine nobleman
- June 19 – Taira no Munemori, Japanese samurai (b. 1147)
- July 18 – Stefan, archbishop of Uppsala (b. before 1143)
- September 11 – Stephen Hagiochristophorites, Byzantine official
- September 12 – Andronikos I Komnenos, Byzantine emperor, assassinated (b. 1118)
- September – John Komnenos (son of Andronikos I), Byzantine co-emperor, assassinated (b. 1159)
- November 25 – Lucius III, pope of the Catholic Church (b. 1097)
- December 6 – Afonso I ("the Great"), king of Portugal (b. 1109)
- Abd Allah al-Suhayli, Moorish scholar and writer (b. 1114)
- Bhāskara ("the Teacher"), Indian mathematician (b. 1114)
- Fernando Rodríguez de Castro, Spanish nobleman (b. 1125) (after August 16)
- Ibn Tufail, Arab-Andalusian polymath and writer (b. 1105)
- Máel Íosa Ua Dálaigh, Irish Ollamh Érenn (chief bard)
- Taira no Shigehira, Japanese general, executed (b. 1158)

1186

- January 26 – Ismat ad-Din Khatun, wife of Saladin
- May 29 or June 23 or June 24 – Robert of Torigni
- June 1 – Minamoto no Yukiie, Japanese warlord
- August 19 – Geoffrey II, Duke of Brittany (b. 1158)
- August – Baldwin V of Jerusalem (b. 1177)
- September 29 – William of Tyre, Archbishop of Tyre (b. c. 1130)
- December 8 – Berthold IV, Duke of Zähringen (b.c 1125)

1187

- February 18 – Gilbert Foliot, bishop of London (b. 1110)
- March 18 – Bogusław I, duke of Pomerania (b. 1130)
- May 1 – Roger de Moulins, French Grand Master
- May 6 – Ruben III (or Roupen), Armenian ruler (b. 1145)
- July 4 – Raynald of Châtillon, prince of Antioch (b. 1125)
- October 1 – Yaroslav Osmomysl, Galician prince (b. 1135)
- October 20 – Urban III, pope of the Catholic Church (b. 1120)
- November 9 – Gao Zong, Chinese emperor (b. 1107)
- November 10 – Guðrøðr Óláfsson, Norse king of Dublin
- November 30 – Fujiwara no Hidehira, Japanese nobleman
- December 17 – Gregory VIII, pope of the Catholic Church
- Abu-l-Hasan Ali ibn Ruburtayr, Catalan mercenary general
- Alexios Branas, Byzantine nobleman and usurper
- Clarembald of Arras, French theologian and writer
- Gerard of Cremona, Italian translator and writer (b. 1114)
- Guecellone II, Italian nobleman (House of Da Camino)
- Raymond III, crusader and count of Tripoli (b. 1140)
- Robert of St. Albans, English nobleman and knight
- Rodrigo Álvarez, Galician nobleman and crusader

1188

- January 22 – Ferdinand II, king of León and Galicia (b. 1137)
- January 26 – Eysteinn Erlendsson, Norwegian archbishop
- 1188 – Death of Seljuki Khatun
- October 11 – Robert I (the Great), count of Dreux (b. 1123)
- November 4 – Theobald of Ostia, French abbot and bishop
- November 17 – Usama ibn Munqidh, Arabian poet and knight (b. 1095)
- December 14 – Berthold I, margrave of Istria and Carniola
- December 22 – Richard of Ilchester, bishop of Winchester
- Aoife MacMurrough (or Eva), princess of Leinster (b. 1145)
- Guigo II, prior of the Grande Chatreuse
- Hugh the Chaplain, bishop of Cell Rigmonaid (St. Andrews)
- Roger de Mowbray, English nobleman and knight (b. 1120)

1189

- January 1 – Henry of Marcy, French cardinal-bishop (b. 1136)
- January 20 – Shizong (or Wulu), Chinese emperor (b. 1123)
- February 4 – Gilbert of Sempringham, English priest (b. 1085)
- March 4 – Humbert III ("the Blessed"), count of Savoy (b. 1136)
- March 25 – Frederick, duke of Bohemia (House of Přemyslid)
- c. April – Hugh de Cressy, Norman nobleman and constable
- June 15 – Minamoto no Yoshitsune, Japanese general (b. 1159)
- June 26 – Folmar of Karden, German archbishop (b. 1135)
- June 28 – Matilda of England, duchess of Saxony (b. 1156)
- July 6 – Henry II, king of England (b. 1133)
- July 20 – Muneko, Japanese princess and empress (b. 1126)
- August 20 or 21 – Geoffrey Ridel, English bishop and Lord Chancellor
- September 3 – Jacob of Orléans, French Jewish scholar
- c. September – Benedict of York, English banker and moneylender
- October 4
  - André of Brienne, French nobleman and knight (b. 1135)
  - Gerard de Ridefort, Flemish Grand Master (b. 1140)
- October 14 – Fujiwara no Yasuhira, Japanese nobleman (b. 1155)
- November 11 – William II ("the Good"), king of Sicily (b. 1153)
- November 14 – William de Mandeville, English nobleman
- Anvari, Persian astronomer, poet and writer (b. 1126)
- Benkei, Japanese warrior monk (sōhei) (b. 1155)
- Conchobar Maenmaige Ua Conchobair, Irish king (assassinated)
- Conon II (or Cono), count of Montaigu and Duras
- Elizabeth of Hungary, German duchess (b. 1145)
- Hugh de Paduinan, Scoto-Norman nobleman and Crusader (b. 1140)
- Richard de Morville, Scottish Lord High Constable
- Romano Bobone, Italian cardinal and papal legate
- William de Tracy, English nobleman and knight
