= 1189 =

1189 in various calendars
- Gregorian calendar: 1189; MCLXXXIX
- Ab urbe condita: 1942
- Armenian calendar: 638; ԹՎ ՈԼԸ
- Assyrian calendar: 5939
- Balinese saka calendar: 1110–1111
- Bengali calendar: 595–596
- Berber calendar: 2139
- English Regnal year: 35 Hen. 2 – 1 Ric. 1
- Buddhist calendar: 1733
- Burmese calendar: 551
- Byzantine calendar: 6697–6698
- Chinese calendar: 戊申年 (Earth Monkey); 3886 or 3679 — to — 己酉年 (Earth Rooster); 3887 or 3680
- Coptic calendar: 905–906
- Discordian calendar: 2355
- Ethiopian calendar: 1181–1182
- Hebrew calendar: 4949–4950
- Hindu calendars
- Vikram Samvat: 1245–1246
- Shaka Samvat: 1110–1111
- Kali Yuga: 4289–4290
- Holocene calendar: 11189
- Igbo calendar: 189–190
- Iranian calendar: 567–568
- Islamic calendar: 584–585
- Japanese calendar: Bunji 5 (文治５年)
- Javanese calendar: 1096–1097
- Julian calendar: 1189; MCLXXXIX
- Korean calendar: 3522
- Minguo calendar: 723 before ROC 民前723年
- Nanakshahi calendar: −279
- Seleucid era: 1500/1501 AG
- Thai solar calendar: 1731–1732
- Tibetan calendar: ས་ཕོ་སྤྲེ་ལོ་ (male Earth-Monkey); 1315 or 934 or 162 — to — ས་མོ་བྱ་ལོ་ (female Earth-Bird); 1316 or 935 or 163

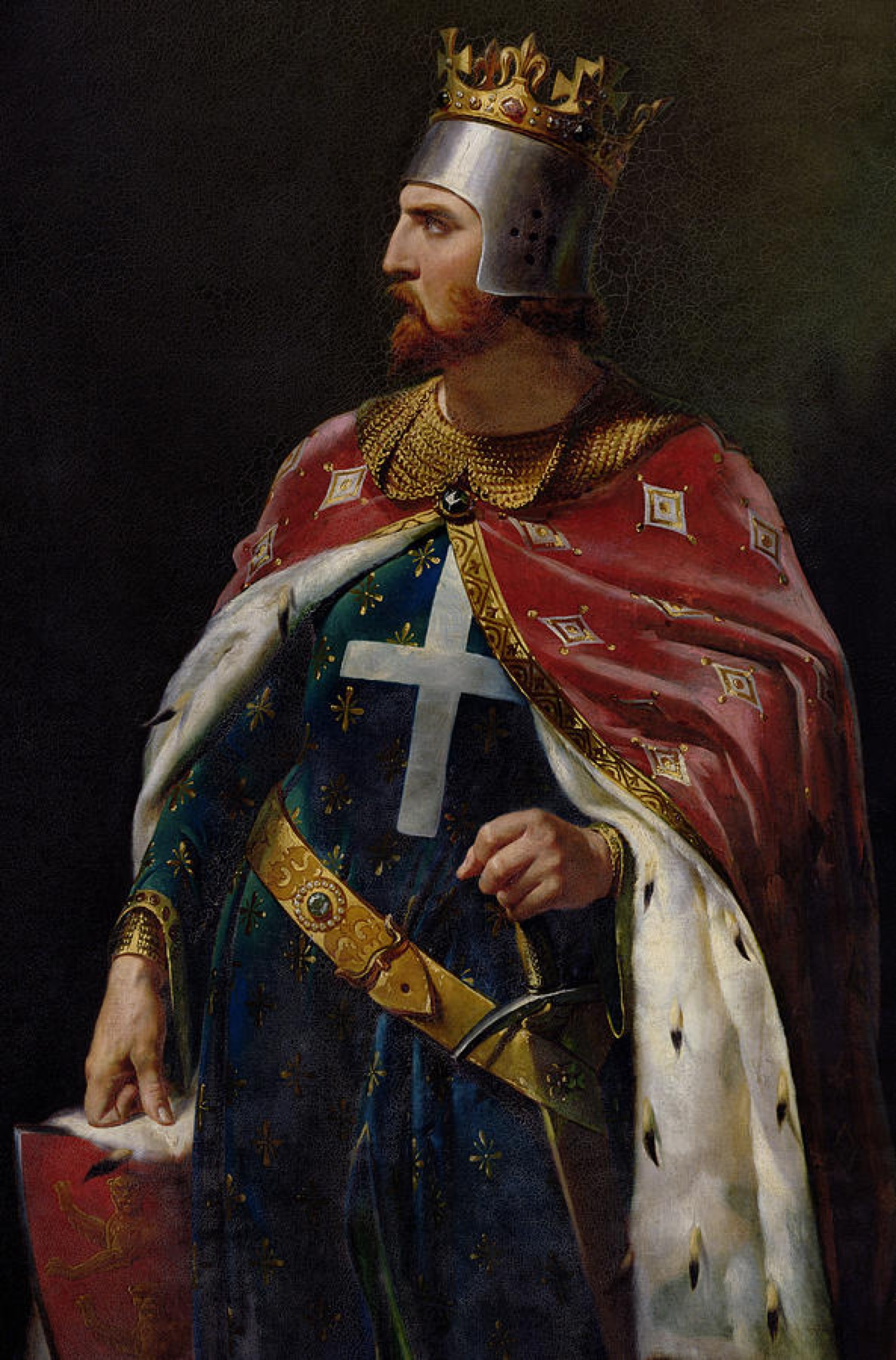
Richard I, King of England from 1189

Year 1189 (MCLXXXIX) was a common year starting on Sunday of the Julian calendar. In English law, 1189 – specifically the beginning of the reign of Richard I – is considered the end of time immemorial.

== Events ==
=== By place ===
==== Continental Europe ====
- May 11 – Emperor Frederick I (Barbarossa) sets out from Regensburg, at the head of a German expeditionary force (some 15,000 men, including 4,000 knights). He has ensured that his lands are safe while he is away on crusade and leaves his son Henry VI in charge of the country. After leaving Germany, Frederick's army is increased by a contingent of 2,000 men led by Prince Géza, younger brother of King Béla III of Hungary. On July 27, he arrives at Niš and is welcomed by Stefan Nemanja, Grand Prince of Serbia. In order to ease his passage, Frederick makes diplomatic contacts with Hungary, the Byzantine Empire and the Seljuk Sultanate of Rum.
- July 6 – King Henry II of England ("Curtmantle") dies at the Château de Chinon, near Tours, after doing homage to Philip II (Augustus), and surrendering the territories around Issoudun in the Centre-Val de Loire. He ends the hostilities against Philip, by agreeing to the peace terms and pays him 20,000 marks in tribute. Henry is succeeded by his son, Richard I ("the Lionheart"), as ruler of England and his remaining territories in France.
- August – Byzantine Emperor Isaac II Angelos denies any crusader access and begins to hinder the German forces who try to cross his frontier. Frederick I progresses with force, by capturing Philippopolis and defeats a Byzantine army (some 3,000 men) that attempts to recapture the city. The Germans are delayed for six months in Thrace.
- August 29 – Ban Kulin, Bosnian ruler, writes the Charter of Ban Kulin, which becomes a symbolic "birth certificate" of Bosnian language and statehood.
- September 3: King Sancho I of Portugal conquers the town of Silves. He orders the city's fortifications to be strengthened, constructs a castle, and assumes the title "King of Silves".
- November 11 – King William II of Sicily ("the Good"), having made peace with Emperor Isaac II and abandoned Thessalonika and other conquests, dies childless at Palermo. The Sicilian nobles elect Tancred of Lecce (illegitimate son of Roger II) as the new ruler of Sicily, instead of Princess Constance and her husband Henry VI, to avoid German rule.
- Frederick I grants Hamburg the status of a free imperial city and tax-free access (or free-trade zone) up the Lower Elbe into the North Sea. He also grants the right to fish, to cut trees and the freedom of military service.

==== Britain ====
- August – William Marshal marries the 17-year-old Isabel de Clare (daughter of Richard de Clare). Through this marriage, he becomes 1st Earl of Pembroke, acquiring huge estates in England, Normandy, Wales and Ireland.
- September 3 – Richard I is crowned king of England in Westminster Abbey. During the coronation, a number of notable Jews are expelled from the banquet and rumours spread that Richard has ordered a massacre of the Jews. This causes an actual massacre of the Jews in London; among those killed is Jacob of Orléans, a respected French Jewish scholar.
- December 5 – King William I ("the Lion") of Scotland gives Richard I 10,000 marks to buy his kingdom's independence. This overturns the Treaty of Falaise which William had to sign when he was captured in 1174.
- December – Richard I sets sail with a crusader army from Dover Castle to France. To ensure he has the allegiance of his brother John, Richard approves of his marriage to their cousin Isabella of Gloucester.
- Winter – John awards land to Bertram de Verdun, a Norman nobleman, and grants Dundalk its charter with town privileges; it becomes a strategic Anglo-Norman stronghold in Ireland.

==== Levant ====
- May – Saladin has reconquered the Crusader Kingdom of Jerusalem except for Tyre. The castles of Montréal and Kerak are captured by Muslim forces. In the north, Saladin has regained the Principality of Antioch except for Antioch and the castle of Al-Qusayr in Syria.
- August 28 – Siege of Acre: King Guy of Lusignan moves from Tyre, where Conrad of Montferrat refuses to hand over the city. Guy and his crusader army (some 7,000 men, including 400 knights) besiege Acre. He makes camp outside, to wait for more reinforcements.
- September – Guy of Lusignan receives reinforcements of some 12,000 men from Denmark, Germany, England, France, and Flanders. He encircles Acre with a double line of fortified positions. On September 15, Saladin launches a failed attack on Guy's camp.
- October 4 – Guy of Lusignan leads the crusader forces to launch a full-on assault on Saladin's camp. With heavy casualties on both sides, neither force gains the upperhand. On October 26, Saladin moves his camp from Acre to Mount Carmel (modern Israel).
- October 30 – An Egyptian fleet (some 50 ships) breaks through the crusader blockade at Acre and reinforces the port-city with some 10,000 men, as well as food and weapons.
- December – An Egyptian fleet reopens communications with Acre. The rest of the winter passes without major incidents, but the supply situation is poor in the besieged city.

==== Asia ====
- February 18 – Emperor Xiaozong abdicates in favour of his son Guangzong as ruler of the Song dynasty. Xiaozong becomes a Taishang Huang ("Retired Emperor") and remains as the de facto ruler of China.

== Births ==
- Al-Mansur Nasir al-Din Muhammad, Ayyubid sultan (d. 1217)
- Archambaud VIII ("the Great"), Bourbon nobleman (d. 1242)
- Ferdinand of Castile, Spanish prince (infante) (d. 1211)
- Pietro Pettinaio, Italian comb-maker and saint (d. 1289)
- Peter Nolasco, French religious leader (d. 1256)
- Skule Bårdsson, Norwegian nobleman (d. 1240)
- Sukaphaa, founder of the Ahom kingdom in Assam (d. 1268)

== Deaths ==
- January 1 – Henry of Marcy, French cardinal-bishop (b. 1136)
- January 20 – Shizong (or Wulu), Chinese emperor (b. 1123)
- February 4 – Gilbert of Sempringham, English priest (b. 1085)
- March 4 – Humbert III ("the Blessed"), count of Savoy (b. 1136)
- March 25 – Frederick, duke of Bohemia (House of Přemyslid)
- c. April – Hugh de Cressy, Norman nobleman and constable
- June 15 – Minamoto no Yoshitsune, Japanese general (b. 1159)
- June 26 – Folmar of Karden, German archbishop (b. 1135)
- June 28 – Matilda of England, duchess of Saxony (b. 1156)
- July 6 – Henry II, king of England (b. 1133)
- July 20 – Muneko, Japanese princess and empress (b. 1126)
- August 20 or 21 – Geoffrey Ridel, English bishop and Lord Chancellor
- September 3 – Jacob of Orléans, French Jewish scholar
- c. September – Benedict of York, English banker and moneylender
- October 4
  - André of Brienne, French nobleman and knight (b. 1135)
  - Gerard de Ridefort, Flemish Grand Master (b. 1140)
- October 14 – Fujiwara no Yasuhira, Japanese nobleman (b. 1155)
- November 11 – William II ("the Good"), king of Sicily (b. 1153)
- November 14 – William de Mandeville, English nobleman
- Anvari, Persian astronomer, poet and writer (b. 1126)
- Benkei, Japanese warrior monk (sōhei) (b. 1155)
- Conchobar Maenmaige Ua Conchobair, Irish king (assassinated)
- Conon II (or Cono), count of Montaigu and Duras
- Elizabeth of Hungary, German duchess (b. 1145)
- Hugh de Paduinan, Scoto-Norman nobleman and Crusader (b. 1140)
- Richard de Morville, Scottish Lord High Constable
- Romano Bobone, Italian cardinal and papal legate
- William de Tracy, English nobleman and knight
