= 1165 =

1165 in various calendars
- Gregorian calendar: 1165; MCLXV
- Ab urbe condita: 1918
- Armenian calendar: 614; ԹՎ ՈԺԴ
- Assyrian calendar: 5915
- Balinese saka calendar: 1086–1087
- Bengali calendar: 571–572
- Berber calendar: 2115
- English Regnal year: 11 Hen. 2 – 12 Hen. 2
- Buddhist calendar: 1709
- Burmese calendar: 527
- Byzantine calendar: 6673–6674
- Chinese calendar: 甲申年 (Wood Monkey); 3862 or 3655 — to — 乙酉年 (Wood Rooster); 3863 or 3656
- Coptic calendar: 881–882
- Discordian calendar: 2331
- Ethiopian calendar: 1157–1158
- Hebrew calendar: 4925–4926
- Hindu calendars
- Vikram Samvat: 1221–1222
- Shaka Samvat: 1086–1087
- Kali Yuga: 4265–4266
- Holocene calendar: 11165
- Igbo calendar: 165–166
- Iranian calendar: 543–544
- Islamic calendar: 560–561
- Japanese calendar: Chōkan 3 / Eiman 1 (永万元年)
- Javanese calendar: 1072–1073
- Julian calendar: 1165; MCLXV
- Korean calendar: 3498
- Minguo calendar: 747 before ROC 民前747年
- Nanakshahi calendar: −303
- Seleucid era: 1476/1477 AG
- Thai solar calendar: 1707–1708
- Tibetan calendar: ཤིང་ཕོ་སྤྲེ་ལོ་ (male Wood-Monkey); 1291 or 910 or 138 — to — ཤིང་མོ་བྱ་ལོ་ (female Wood-Bird); 1292 or 911 or 139

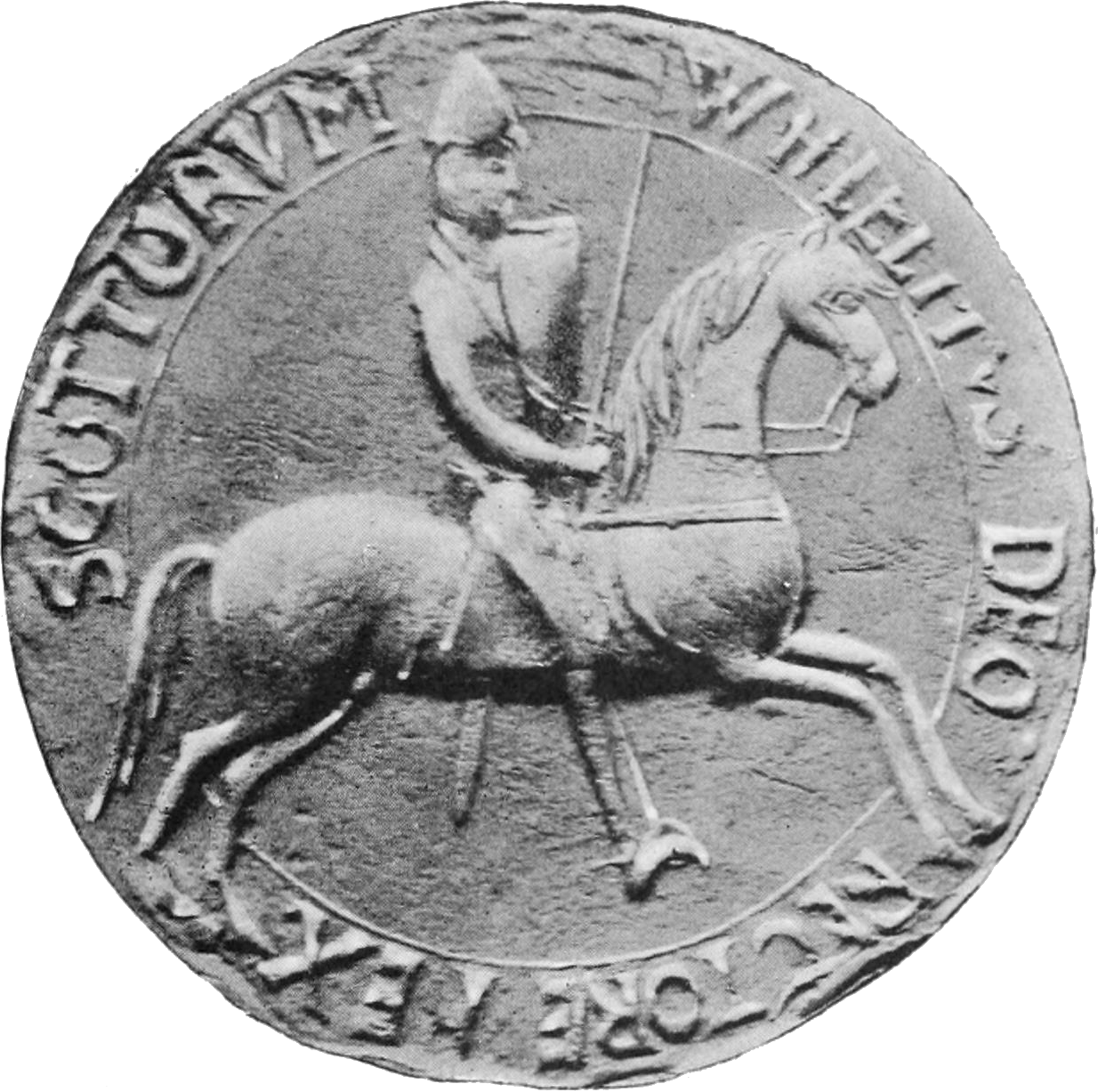
William the Lion, King of Scotland, 1165–1214

Year 1165 (MCLXV) was a common year starting on Friday of the Julian calendar.

== Events ==
=== By place ===
==== Byzantine Empire ====
- Spring – Byzantine Emperor Manuel I Komnenos makes an alliance with Venice against Holy Roman Emperor Frederick Barbarossa, who takes an oath at the Diet of Würzburg to support Antipope Paschal III against Pope Alexander III.
- Andronikos I Komnenos, a cousin of Manuel I, escapes from prison at Constantinople. After passing through many dangers, he reaches Kiev and seeks refuge at the court of Prince Yaroslav Osmomysl.

==== Europe ====
- October 15 – Battle of Fahs al-Jullab: Almohad forces defeat Ibn Mardanish, ruler of the Taifa of Murcia. His army is routed at a place called the "merchant field" near Alhama, in the valley of the Guadalentín.
- Reconquista – Gerald the Fearless, Portuguese warrior and adventurer, seizes the city of Évora by surprise. The same year (or soon after), he takes Cáceres, Trujillo, Montánchez, Moura, Monsaraz and Alconchel from the Almohads.
- Benjamin of Tudela, Spanish Jewish traveler, sets out on his journey from the northeast Iberian Peninsula (modern Spain), on a pilgrimage to the land of Israel and beyond.
- Otto II, Margrave of Meissen, grants Leipzig city and market privileges. The city is located at the crossways of the Via Regia and Via Imperii trade routes.

==== British Isles ====
- c. August – Battle of Crogen: Owain Gwynedd (Owain Fawr), ruler of the Kingdom of Gwynedd in north Wales, having formed an alliance with his nephew Rhys ap Gruffydd, prince of Deheubarth, to challenge English rule, defeats King Henry II of England and drives his army out of Wales.
- December 9 – King Malcolm IV of Scotland dies at Jedburgh after a 12-year reign and is succeeded by his brother William the Lion as ruler of Scotland (until 1214).
- Eleanor of Aquitaine, queen consort of England, spends most of the year in Anjou. Her husband, Henry II, begins an affair with "the Fair" Rosamund Clifford.

==== Asia ====
- January 30 – Closeted Emperor Go-Shirakawa holds an opening ceremony for the Sanjūsangen-dō, a temple built by Taira no Kiyomori in Japan.
- August 3 – Emperor Nijō of Japan abdicates the throne, dying soon after following a 7-year reign. He is succeeded by his 1-year-old son Rokujō as 79th emperor.
- In China the Jin dynasty ("Great Jin") and the Song dynasty make a lasting peace (until 1205).

=== By topic ===
==== Religion ====
- Eskil, Danish archbishop of Lund, appoints Fulco as the first Bishop of Estonia, marking the early beginning of the introduction of Christianity to the country. He will visit Estonia for the first time in 1169 or 1170.
- The construction of Liuhe Pagoda ("Six Harmonies Pagoda") in Hangzhou is completed in Song dynasty China.
- Approximate date – Hildegard of Bingen, German Benedictine abbess, founds Eibingen Abbey near Rüdesheim am Rhein.

== Births ==
- July 28 – Ibn Arabi, Andalusian philosopher (d. 1240)
- August 21 – Philip II, king of France (d. 1223)
- October – Joan of England, queen consort of Sicily (d. 1199)
- November – Henry VI, Holy Roman Emperor (d. 1197)
- Blacatz, French knight and troubadour (d. 1237)
- Jean de Montmirail, French nobleman and Cistercian monk (d. 1217)
- Philippe du Plessis, French Grand Master (d. 1209)
- Han (or Gogshu), Chinese empress (d. 1200)
- Lady Shizuka Gozen, Japanese court dancer (d. 1211)
- Theobald Walter, 1st Chief Butler of Ireland, Anglo-Norman High Sheriff (d. 1206)
- Approximate date
  - Albéric Clément, 1st Marshal of France (d. 1191)
  - Albert, German-born bishop of Riga (d. 1229)
  - Jean Bodel, French poet and writer (d. 1210)
  - Conrad III of Scharfenberg, German cleric and bishop (d. 1224)
  - Henry I ("the Brave"), duke of Brabant (d. 1235)
  - Henry the Bearded, High Duke of Poland (d. 1238)
  - Hermann von Salza, German nobleman, Grand Master of the Teutonic Knights (d. 1239)
  - Renaud I, Count of Dammartin (Reginald of Boulogne), French nobleman (d. 1227)
  - Ruben II (or Roupen), Armenian prince (d. 1170)
  - Waleran III (or Walram), duke of Limburg (d. 1226)
  - William the Breton, French chronicler (d. 1225)

== Deaths ==
- January 24 – William of Ypres, Flemish nobleman (b. 1090)
- February 7 – Stephen of Armenia, Armenian nobleman (b. 1111)
- March 27 – Awn al-Din ibn Hubayra, Abbasid vizier (b. 1105)
- April 11
  - Ibn al-Tilmidh, Arab physician and calligrapher (b. 1074)
  - Stephen IV, king of Hungary and Croatia (b. 1133)
- July 22 – John Marshal (or FitzGilbert), Marshal of England (b. 1105)
- September 5 – Nijō, emperor of Japan (b. 1143)
- December 9 – King Malcolm IV of Scotland (b. 1141)
- Adalgott of Disentis, German abbot and bishop
- Goswin of Anchin, Flemish Benedictine abbot (b. 1086)
- Gottfried of Admont, German Benedictine abbot
- Helias de Say (or Hellias), Anglo-Norman nobleman
- Muhammad al-Idrisi, Arab geographer (b. 1100)
- Rostislav Glebovich, Kievan prince of Minsk
- Sibylla of Anjou, countess consort of Flanders (b. 1112)
