= 1166 =

1166 in various calendars
- Gregorian calendar: 1166; MCLXVI
- Ab urbe condita: 1919
- Armenian calendar: 615; ԹՎ ՈԺԵ
- Assyrian calendar: 5916
- Balinese saka calendar: 1087–1088
- Bengali calendar: 572–573
- Berber calendar: 2116
- English Regnal year: 12 Hen. 2 – 13 Hen. 2
- Buddhist calendar: 1710
- Burmese calendar: 528
- Byzantine calendar: 6674–6675
- Chinese calendar: 乙酉年 (Wood Rooster); 3863 or 3656 — to — 丙戌年 (Fire Dog); 3864 or 3657
- Coptic calendar: 882–883
- Discordian calendar: 2332
- Ethiopian calendar: 1158–1159
- Hebrew calendar: 4926–4927
- Hindu calendars
- Vikram Samvat: 1222–1223
- Shaka Samvat: 1087–1088
- Kali Yuga: 4266–4267
- Holocene calendar: 11166
- Igbo calendar: 166–167
- Iranian calendar: 544–545
- Islamic calendar: 561–562
- Japanese calendar: Eiman 2 / Nin'an 1 (仁安元年)
- Javanese calendar: 1073–1074
- Julian calendar: 1166; MCLXVI
- Korean calendar: 3499
- Minguo calendar: 746 before ROC 民前746年
- Nanakshahi calendar: −302
- Seleucid era: 1477/1478 AG
- Thai solar calendar: 1708–1709
- Tibetan calendar: ཤིང་མོ་བྱ་ལོ་ (female Wood-Bird); 1292 or 911 or 139 — to — མེ་ཕོ་ཁྱི་ལོ་ (male Fire-Dog); 1293 or 912 or 140

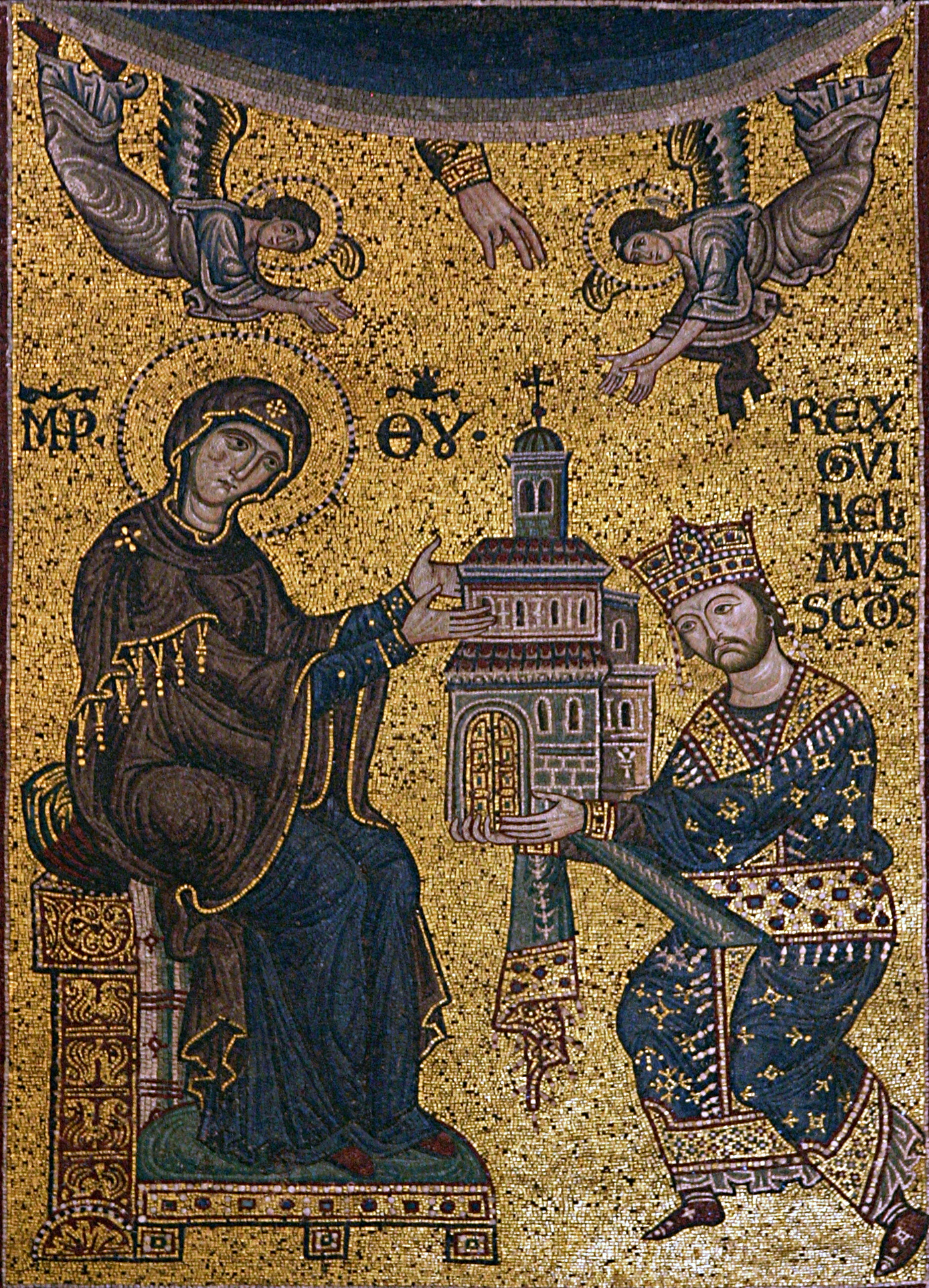
King William II of Sicily (who succeeds to the throne age 12 this year) offering the Monreale Cathedral to the Virgin Mary.

Year 1166 (MCLXVI) was a common year starting on Saturday of the Julian calendar.

== Events ==
=== By place ===
==== Byzantine Empire ====
- Byzantine Emperor Manuel I Komnenos asks Venice to help pay the costs of defending Sicily, whose Norman rulers have had good relations with Venice. Doge Vitale II Michiel refuses to pay the requested subsidy. Manuel begins to cultivate relationships with the main commercial rivals of Venice: Genoa and Pisa. He grants them their own trade quarters in Constantinople, very near the Venetian settlements.

==== Europe ====
- May 7 – King William I ("the Wicked") of Sicily dies at Palermo after a 12-year reign. He is succeeded by his 12-year-old son William II ("the Good"), whose mother, Margaret of Navarre, will be regent until he comes of age.
- July 5 – The town of Bad Kleinkirchheim (in modern Austria) is first mentioned, in an ecclesiastical document, in which Archbishop Conrad II of Salzburg confirms the donation of a chapel, nearby Millstatt Abbey.
- Autumn – Holy Roman Emperor Frederick Barbarossa begins his fourth Italian campaign, hoping to secure the claim of Antipope Paschal III in Rome and the coronation of his wife Beatrice I, Countess of Burgundy, as Holy Roman Empress.
- Mieszko III the Old proclaims a Prussian crusade against the pagans and pressures the collaboration of Frederick I. He leaves Greater Poland in the hands of his younger brother Casimir II the Just.
- Henry the Lion, duke of Saxony, has the Brunswick Lion created at Dankwarderode Castle in Braunschweig (modern Germany). (Mentioned by Albert of Stade, a German abbot and chronicler, as the year of origin.)

==== British Isles ====
- Summer – Henry II of England invades and conquers Brittany to punish the local Breton barons. He grants the territory to his 7-year-old son Geoffrey.
- Henry II enacts the Assize of Clarendon, reforming English law, influential in the development of jury trial in common law countries worldwide.
- Cartae Baronum ("Charters of the Barons"), a survey commissioned by the English Treasury requiring each baron to declare how many knights he had enfeoffed.
- Muirchertach Mac Lochlainn, High King of Ireland, is killed. He is succeeded by Ruaidrí Ua Conchobair, king of Connacht, who defeats Diarmaid mac Murchadha (or Dermot, another ruler in eastern Ireland) in battle. Diarmaid is exiled and goes to Normandy and the court of King Henry II of England to ask for assistance in retaking his kingdom. Henry gives him permission to find a willing army from either England or Wales. Richard de Clare, 2nd Earl of Pembroke ("Strongbow") and his half-brothers Robert FitzStephen and Maurice FitzGerald, Lord of Lanstephan, agree to help Diarmaid mac Murchadha in return for Diarmaid's daughter's hand in marriage.
- Anglo-Norman soldier William Marshal is knighted while on campaign in Normandy; he will be described as "the greatest knight that ever lived".

== Births ==
- February 24 – Al-Mansur Abdallah, Zaidi imam (d. 1217)
- July 29 – Henry II, Count of Champagne (Henry I, King of Jerusalem) (d. 1197)
- December 24 – John, king of England (d. 1216)
- Abu al-Abbas al-Nabati, Andalusian Moorish pharmacist (d. 1239)
- Arnold of Altena, German nobleman (d. 1209)
- Ch'oe U, Korean general and dictator (d. 1249)
- Judah ben Isaac Messer Leon, French rabbi (b. 1224)
- Odo III (or Eudes), duke of Burgundy (d. 1218)
- Shunten (Shunten-Ō), Ryukyu ruler of Okinawa (d. 1237)
- Wansong Xingxiu, Chinese Buddhist monk (d. 1246)
- Approximate date
  - Alan IV ("the Young"), viscount of Rohan, Morbihan (d. 1205)
  - Humphrey IV, lord of Toron
  - Philip d'Aubigny, Anglo-Norman knight and courtier (d. 1236)
  - William de Warenne, 5th Earl of Surrey, English nobleman (d. 1240)

== Deaths ==
- February 21 – Abdul Qadir Gilani, Persian preacher (b. 1078)
- April 9 – Waleran de Beaumont, English nobleman (b. 1104)
- May 7 – William I ("the wicked"), king of Sicily (b. 1120)
- May 12 – Gunhilda of Dunbar, Scottish Noblewoman (b. 1120)
- August 23 – Konoe Motozane, Japanese nobleman (b. 1143)
- October 12 – Henry I, duke of Wiślica
- Ahmad Yasawi, Turkic Sufi religious leader (b. 1093)
- Athanasius VII bar Qatra, Syrian patriarch of Antioch
- Fujiwara no Motozane, Japanese waka poet (b. 1143)
- Gillamaire Ua Conallta, Irish poet and Chief Ollam
- Grigor III Pahlavuni, Armenian catholicos of Cilicia (b. 1093)
- Muirchertach Mac Lochlainn, High King of Ireland
- Rosalia, Norman-Sicilian noblewoman, hermit and saint (b. 1130)
