= Eiryaku =

Period of Japanese history (1160–1161 CE)

Eiryaku (永暦) was a Japanese era name (年号, nengō; lit. "year name") after Heiji and before Ōhō. This period spanned the years from January 1160 through September 1161. The reigning emperor was Nijō-tennō (二条天皇).

== Change of era ==
- February 9, 1160 Eiryaku gannen (永暦元年): The new era name was created to mark an event or a number of events. The previous era ended and a new one commenced in Heiji 2, on the 10th day of the 1st month.

== Events of the Eiryaku era ==
- 1160 (Eiryaku 1): Minamoto no Yoshitomo (1123–1160), was killed in a campaign to overthrow the imperial chancellor, Taira no Kiyomori. Yoshitomo's wife, Tokiwa Gozen was compelled to flee Kyoto with her three sons.

== Notes ==
Preceded by Heiji	Era or nengō Eiryaku; 1160–1161	Succeeded by Ōhō
