= Hōgen =

In Japanese, Hōgen may refer to several words. Among them:

- Hōgen (era) (保元, 1156–1159), an era in Japan
- Hōgen rebellion, a short civil war in 1156
- dialect (方言) — for example: "eigo no hōgen" (English dialect)

== See also ==
- Hogen - the Cornish word for pasty
- Japanese dialects
