= 1159 =

1159 in various calendars
- Gregorian calendar: 1159; MCLIX
- Ab urbe condita: 1912
- Armenian calendar: 608; ԹՎ ՈԸ
- Assyrian calendar: 5909
- Balinese saka calendar: 1080–1081
- Bengali calendar: 565–566
- Berber calendar: 2109
- English Regnal year: 5 Hen. 2 – 6 Hen. 2
- Buddhist calendar: 1703
- Burmese calendar: 521
- Byzantine calendar: 6667–6668
- Chinese calendar: 戊寅年 (Earth Tiger); 3856 or 3649 — to — 己卯年 (Earth Rabbit); 3857 or 3650
- Coptic calendar: 875–876
- Discordian calendar: 2325
- Ethiopian calendar: 1151–1152
- Hebrew calendar: 4919–4920
- Hindu calendars
- Vikram Samvat: 1215–1216
- Shaka Samvat: 1080–1081
- Kali Yuga: 4259–4260
- Holocene calendar: 11159
- Igbo calendar: 159–160
- Iranian calendar: 537–538
- Islamic calendar: 553–554
- Japanese calendar: Hōgen 4 / Heiji 1 (平治元年)
- Javanese calendar: 1065–1066
- Julian calendar: 1159; MCLIX
- Korean calendar: 3492
- Minguo calendar: 753 before ROC 民前753年
- Nanakshahi calendar: −309
- Seleucid era: 1470/1471 AG
- Thai solar calendar: 1701–1702
- Tibetan calendar: ས་ཕོ་སྟག་ལོ་ (male Earth-Tiger); 1285 or 904 or 132 — to — ས་མོ་ཡོས་ལོ་ (female Earth-Hare); 1286 or 905 or 133

Year 1159 (MCLIX) was a common year starting on Thursday of the Julian calendar.

== Events ==
- September 7 – Pope Alexander III succeeds Pope Adrian IV, as the 170th pope.
- Taira no Kiyomori leaves Kyōto on a personal pilgrimage, giving Fujiwara no Nobuyori and his Minamoto allies the perfect chance to stage an uprising.
- Tunis is reconquered from the Normans, by the Almohad caliphs.
- (Approximate date): Churchman Richard FitzNeal is appointed Lord High Treasurer in England, in charge of Henry II of England's Exchequer, an office he will hold for almost 40 years.

== Births ==
- Minamoto no Yoshitsune, Japanese general (d. 1189)

== Deaths ==
- May 30 – Wladislaus II, the Exile of Poland (b. 1105)
- August 29 – Bertha of Sulzbach, Byzantine Empress (b. 1110s)
- September 1 – Pope Adrian IV (b. c. 1100)
- October 11 – William of Blois, Count of Boulogne and Earl of Surrey (b. c. 1137)
- Count Joscelin II of Edessa
