= Peter of Siena =

Peter of Siena may refer to:

- Peter of Siena (died 1289)
- Peter of Siena (died 1321)
