= Kyūju =

Period of Japanese history (1154–1156 CE)

Kyūju (久寿) was a Japanese era name (年号, nengō, lit. "year name") after Ninpei and before Hōgen. This period spanned the years from October 1154 through April 1156. The reigning emperors were Konoe-tennō (近衛天皇) and Emperor Go-Shirakawa-tennō (後白河天皇).

== Change of era ==
- February 14, 1154 Kyūju gannen (久寿元年): The new era name was created to mark an event or a number of events. The previous era ended and a new one commenced in Ninpei 4, on the 28th day of the 10th month of 1154.

== Events of the Kyūju era ==
- 1154 (Kyūju 1, 5th month ): The udaijin Minamoto Masasada retired from public life to become a priest at age 61. He died several years later.
- 1154 (Kyūju 1, 8th month): Fujiwara Saneyoshi, Grand General of the Right, was elevated to the role of Grand General of the Left; and the former dainagon Fujiwara Kanenaga (aged 17) was elevated to take on the newly vacated role of Grand General of the Right.
- August 22, 1155 (Kyūju 2, 23rd day of the 7th month): Emperor Konoe died at the age of 17 years without leaving any heirs.
- August 23, 1155 (Kyūju 2, 24th day of the 7th month): In the 14th year of Konoe-tennō's reign (近衛天皇14年), the emperor died; and despite an ensuring dispute over who should follow her as sovereign, contemporary scholars then construed that the succession (senso) was received by a younger brother, the 14th son of former-Emperor Toba. Shortly thereafter, Emperor Go-Shirakawa is said to have acceded to the throne (sokui).

== Notes ==
Preceded by Ninpei	Era or nengō Kyūju; 1154–1156	Succeeded by Hōgen
