= Chōkan =

Period of Japanese history (1163–1165 CE)

Chōkan (長寛) was a Japanese era name (年号, nengō; lit. "year name") after Ōhō and before Eiman. This period spanned the years from March 1163 through June 1165. The reigning emperors were Nijō-tennō (二条天皇) and Emperor Rokujō-tennō (六条天皇).

== Change of era ==
- February 5, 1163 Chōkan gannen (長寛元年): The new era name was created to mark an event or series of events. The previous era ended and a new one commenced in Ōhō 3, on the 29th day of the 3rd month.

== Events of the Chōkan era ==
- 1163 (Chōkan 1, 1st month): Taira no Shigemori (1138–1179) was promoted to the second rank of the 3rd class in the court hierarchy.
- 1163 (Chōkan 2, 2nd month): A large congregation of Buddhist priests came together at the Tōdai-ji and Kōfuku-ji temples to recite prayers for the prosperity of the Imperial Family.
- September 14, 1164 (Chōkan 2, on the 26th day of the 8th month): The former-Emperor Sutoku died at the age of 46.

== Notes ==
Preceded by Ōhō	Era or nengō Chōkan; 1163–1165	Succeeded by Eiman
