= Ōhō =

Period of Japanese history (1161–1163 CE)

Ōhō (応保) was a Japanese era name (年号, nengō, lit. "year name") after Eiryaku and before Chōkan. This period spanned the years from September 1161 through March 1163. The reigning emperor was Nijō-tennō (二条天皇).

== Change of era ==
- January 28, 1161 Ōhō gannen (長寛元年): The new era name was created to mark an event or a number of events. The previous era ended and a new one commenced in Eiryaku 2, on the 4th day of the 9th month of 1161.

== Events of the Ōhō era ==
- 1161 (Ōhō 1, 2nd month): The emperor visited Kasuga Shrine and other shrines which were situated just outside the boundaries of the capital city.
- July 31, 1162 (Ōhō 2, 18th day of the 6th month): Fujiwara no Tadazane died.

== Notes ==
Preceded by Eiryaku	Era or nengō Ōhō; 1161–1163	Succeeded by Chōkan
