= Robert of St. Albans =

Templar knight who converted to Islam

- Born: 1150s/60s Kingdom of England
- Died: 1187; Near Jerusalem, Ayyubid Sultanate
- Military career
- Allegiance: Knights Templar (before 1185); Ayyubid dynasty (1185–1187)
- Branch: Saladin's Army
- Conflicts: Crusades; Battle of Hattin; Siege of Jerusalem

Robert of St Albans (Note: Also known as Ralph of Dunstable and Robert of Dunstable.) (Latin: Robertus de Saneto Albano; died 1187) was an English Templar Knight who converted to Islam from Christianity in 1185. In 1187, he led an army for Saladin against the Crusaders during the Battle of Hattin as well as the reconquest of Jerusalem, which was at the time under the control of the Franks.

Robert married the niece of Saladin. In 1187, Robert fought for Saladin against the Crusaders during the Battle of Hattin and the Siege of Jerusalem. Robert died the same year outside of Jerusalem. It was stated that: “He devastated the country around Nablus and was killed outside Jerusalem in 1187.”

According to Roger of Howden, Robert promised to deliver Saladin the city of Jerusalem, married his niece, became a Prince and was made a leader of Saladin's army. However, the historian Helen J. Nicholson calls into question the validity of Howden's account, stating that it "reads like a fairy tale".

== See also ==
- List of converts to Islam
