= Guichard of Pontigny =

French archbishop

Guichard, also known under the name of Guichard of Pontigny (died in Lyon on 27 September 1181) was a French churchman, Archbishop of Lyon from 1165.

== Biography ==
Born in the early twelfth century, he became a Cistercian monk and abbot of Pontigny in 1137. It welcomes Thomas Becket in 1164. King Louis VII of France and Pope Alexander III dictate as Archbishop of Lyon in 1165 against Dreux de Beauvoir (near Frederick Barbarossa), after two years of struggle.

In 1167, he passed a preliminary agreement with the Count Guy II of Forez canceling the provisions of Frederick Barbarossa, restoring his rights to the count of the city of Lyon and bringing peace to the region. The count gave thereafter all its rights over Lyon and the Lyonnais to the archbishop by the permutation of 1173, confirmed by a bull of Pope Alexander III the following year.

He undertook the construction of the new cathedral of Lyon and construction of large cloister. He also encouraged the restoration of the abbey of Saint-Pierre-Les-Nonnains.

He urged the Count of Forez to compensate the abbey Ainay for the destruction it had caused its dependencies during conflict.
