= Nin'an =

Period of Japanese history (1166–1169 CE)

Nin'an (仁安), also known as Ninnan, was a Japanese era name (年号, nengō, lit. "year name") after Eiman and before Kaō. This period spanned the years from August 1166 through April 1169. The reigning emperors were Rokujō-tennō (六条天皇) and Takakura-tennō (高倉天皇).

== Change of era ==
- February 3, 1166 Nin'an gannen (仁安元年): The new era name was created to mark an event or series of events. The previous era ended and a new one commenced in Eiman 2, on the 27th day of the 8th month of 1166.

== Events of the Nin'an era ==
- 1168 (Nin'an 3, 2nd month ): Rokujō was deposed at age 5, and he received the title Daijō-daijin tennō.
- March 30, 1168 (Nin'an 3, 19th day of the 2nd month): In the 3rd year of Rokujō-tennō's reign (六条天皇3年), the emperor was deposed by his grandfather, and the succession (senso) was received by his cousin, the third son of the retired-Emperor Go-Shirakawa. Sometime thereafter, Emperor Takakura is said to have acceded to the throne (sokui), and he is proclaimed emperor.
- April 29, 1168 (Nin'an 3, 20th day of the 3rd month): Takakura succeeds Rokujo on the Chrysanthemum Throne.

Preceded by Eiman	Era or nengō Nin'an; 1166–1169	Succeeded by Kaō
