= Heiji =

Period of Japanese history (1159–1160 CE)

Heiji (平治) was a Japanese era name (年号, nengō; lit. "year name") after Hōgen and before Eiryaku. This period lasted from April 1159 until January 1160. The reigning emperor was Emperor Nijō-tennō (二条天皇).

== Change of era ==
- January 21, 1159 Heiji gannen (平治元年): The new era name was created to mark an event or series of events. The previous era ended and a new one commenced in Hōgen 4, on the 20th day of the 4th month of 1159.

== Events of the Heiji era ==
- January 23, 1159 (Heiji 1, the 3rd day of the 1st month ): The emperor visited his father.
- January 19–May 5, 1159 (Heiji 1, 9th-26th day of the 12th month): The "Heiji Rebellion", also known as the "Heiji Insurrection" or the "Heiji War."

== Notes ==
Preceded by Hōgen	Era or nengō Heiji; 1159–1160	Succeeded by Eiryaku
