= Emperor Nijō =

Emperor of Japan from 1158 to 1165

Emperor Nijō 二条天皇
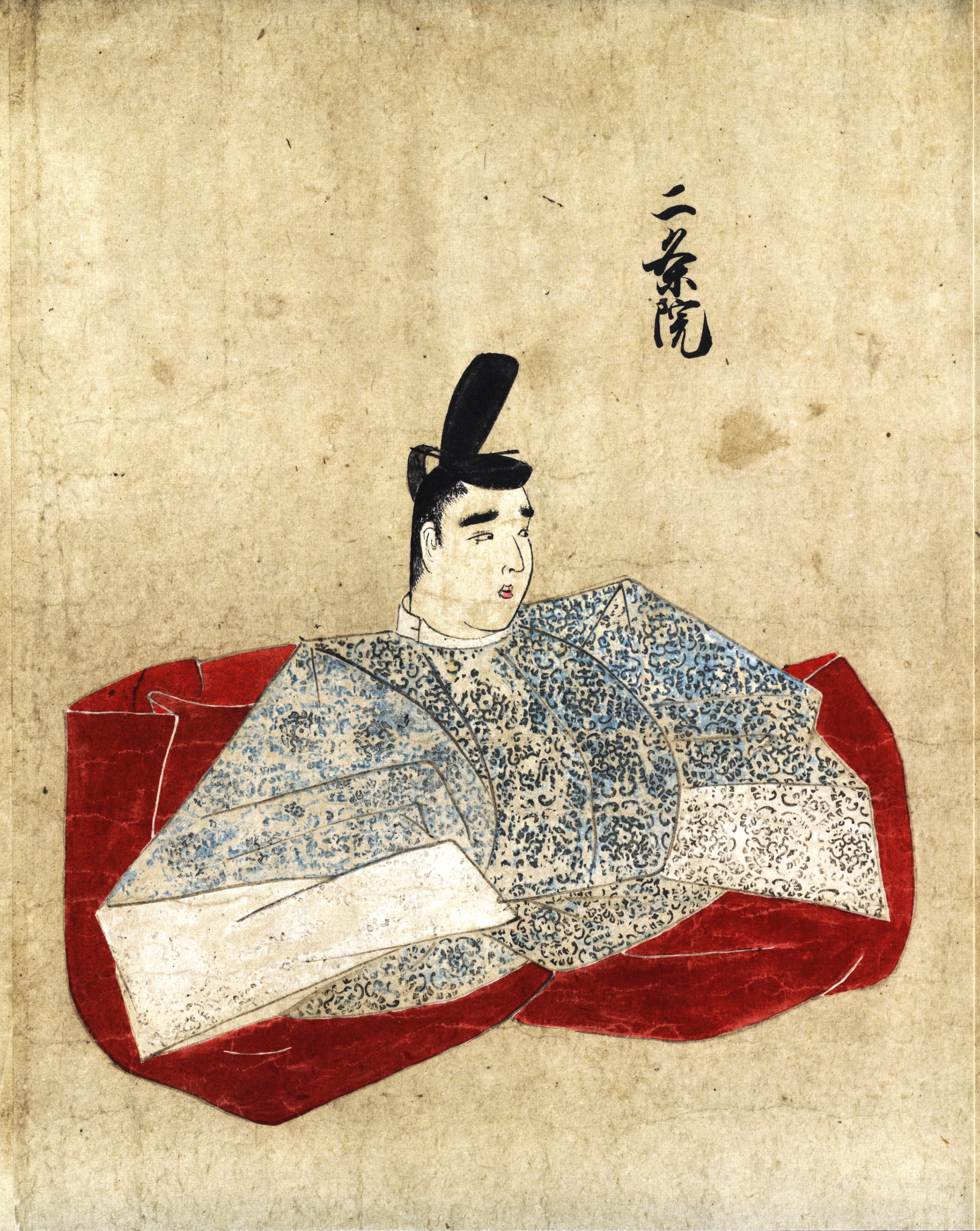
- Portrait from the Tenshi Sekkan Miei

Emperor of Japan
- Reign: September 5, 1158 – August 3, 1165
- Enthronement: January 11, 1159
- Predecessor: Go-Shirakawa
- Successor: Rokujō
- Born: July 31, 1143
- Died: September 5, 1165 (aged 22)
- Burial: Kōryū-ji no Misasagi (香隆寺陵) (Kyoto)
- Spouse: Yoshiko; Fujiwara no Ikushi
- Issue: Emperor Rokujō
Posthumous name
- Tsuigō: Emperor Nijō (二条院 or 二条天皇)
- House: Imperial House of Japan
- Father: Emperor Go-Shirakawa
- Mother: Minamoto Atsushiko

Emperor Nijō (二条天皇, Nijō-tennō; July 31, 1143 – September 5, 1165) was the 78th emperor of Japan, according to the traditional order of succession. His reign spanned the years from 1158 through 1165.

== Genealogy ==
Before his ascension to the Chrysanthemum Throne, his personal name (his imina) was Morihito-shinnō (守仁親王).

He was the eldest son of Emperor Go-Shirakawa. He was the father of Emperor Rokujō.

- Empress: Imperial Princess Yoshiko (姝子内親王) later Takamatsu-in (高松院), Emperor Toba’s daughter.
- Empress: Fujiwara no Ikushi (藤原育子), Fujiwara no Tadamichi’s daughter
- Tai-Kōtaigō: Fujiwara Masuko (藤原多子) Later Grand Empress Dowager Omiya, Tokudaiji Kin'yoshi's daughter.
- Toku-no-Kimi (督の君), Minamoto Tadafusa’s daughter also Fujiwara no Narichika’s Wife
- Kasuga-dono (春日殿), Nakahara Moromoto’s daughter
  - First Daughter: Imperial Princess Yoshiko (僐子内親王; 1159-1171)
- Umeryo-kimi (右馬助), Minamoto Mitsunari’s daughter
  - First Son: Imperial Prince Priest Son'e (尊恵法親王; 1164-1192)
- Ōkura-daisuke (大蔵大輔)
  - Second Son: Imperial Prince Nobuhito (順仁親王) become Emperor Rokujo
- Minamoto Tadafusa’s daughter
  - Third Son: Shine (真恵)

== Events of Nijō's life ==
Nijō was proclaimed as heir to Emperor Go-Shirakawa.

- Hōgen 1, 2nd day of the 7th month (1156): Cloistered Emperor Toba-in died at age 54.
- Hōgen 1, 10th–29th days of the 7th month (1156): The Hōgen Rebellion, also known as the Hōgen Insurrection or the Hōgen War.
- Hōgen 4, on the 11th day of the 8th month (1158): In the third year of Go-Shirakawa-tennō's reign (後白河天皇二十五年), the emperor abdicated; and the succession (‘‘senso’’) was received by his eldest son. Shortly thereafter, Emperor Nijō is said to have acceded to the throne (‘‘sokui’’).

After Nijō was formally enthroned, the management of all affairs continued to rest entirely in the hands of the retired emperor, Go-Shirakawa.

- Heiji 1, 9th–26th day of the 12th month (1159): The Heiji Rebellion, also known as the Heiji Insurrection or the Heiji War.
- Chōkan 2, on the 26th day of the 8th month (1164):The former-Emperor Sutoku died at the age of 46.
- Eiman 1 (1165): The infant son of Emperor Nijō was named heir apparent and therefore Crown Prince, and would soon after become Emperor Rokujō.
- Eiman 1, on the 25th day of the 6th month (1165): In the seventh year of Nijō-tennō's reign (桓武天皇七年), the emperor fell so very ill that he abdicated; and the succession (‘‘senso’’) was received by his son. Shortly thereafter, Emperor Rokujō is said to have acceded to the throne (‘‘sokui’’).
- Eiman 1, 27th–28th day of the 7th month (1165): The former Emperor Nijō died at age 22.

=== Kugyō ===
Kugyō (公卿) is a collective term for the very few most powerful men attached to the court of the Emperor of Japan in pre-Meiji eras.

In general, this elite group included only three to four men at a time. These were hereditary courtiers whose experience and background would have brought them to the pinnacle of a life's career. During Nijō's reign, this apex of the Daijō-kan included:

- Kampaku, Konoe Motozane, 1143–1166.
- Sadaijin, Konoe Motozane.
- Udaijin
- Nadaijin
- Dainagon

== Eras of Nijō's reign ==
The years of Nijō's reign are more specifically identified by more than one era name or nengō.

- Hōgen (1156–1159)
- Heiji (1159–1160)
- Eiryaku (1160–1161)
- Ōhō (1161–1163)
- Chōkan (1163–1165)
- Eiman (1165–1166)

== Ancestry ==
Ancestors of Emperor Nijō

16. Emperor Shirakawa (1053-1130)
8. Emperor Horikawa (1079-1107)
17. Fujiwara no Kenshi (1057-1084)
4. Emperor Toba (1103-1156)
18. Fujiwara no Sanesue (1035-1092)
9. Fujiwara no Ishi (1076-1103)
19. Fujiwara no Mutsuko
2. Emperor Go-Shirakawa (1127-1192)
20. Fujiwara no Sanesue (1035-1092)
10. Fujiwara no Kinzane (1053-1107)
21. Fujiwara no Mutsuko
5. Fujiwara no Tamako (1101-1145)
22. Fujiwara no Takakata (1014-1079)
11. Fujiwara no Mitsuko (1060-1121)
1. Emperor Nijō
24. Fujiwara no Yorimichi (992-1074)
12. Fujiwara no Morozane (1042-1101)
25. Fujiwara no Gishi
6. Fujiwara no Tsunezane (1068-1131)
26. Fujiwara no Motosada (b. 1020)
13. Fujiwara
3. Minamoto no Yoshiko (1116-1143)
14. Fujiwara no Kinzane (1053-1107)
7. Fujiwara no Kimiko (b. 1087?)
15. Fujiwara no Mitsuko (1060-1121)

== See also ==
- Emperor of Japan
- List of Emperors of Japan
- Imperial cult
- Emperor Go-Nijō

== Notes ==
Japanese Imperial kamon — a stylized chrysanthemum blossom

Regnal titles
Preceded by Emperor Go-Shirakawa	Emperor of Japan: Nijō; 1158–1165	Succeeded by Emperor Rokujō
