= Romano Bobone (12th century) =

Romano Bobone (died 1189 in Rome) was an Italian cardinal.

== Life ==
His year and place of birth are unknown, but this is presumed to be Rome, where his family was already well-represented in the Roman Curia. He and cardinal Soffredo were made papal legates to Philip II of France and Henry II of England, negotiating a two-year truce between them.

On 21 March 1188, pope Clement III made him cardinal deacon of San Giorgio in Velabro.

According to Aubery, he was transferred to the church of Porto. But it seems that Father Federigo da S. Pietro, a Discalced Augustinian, confuses Bobone Romano with Andrea Bobone of Porto, cardinal deacon of Sant'Anastasia al Palatino and Porto-Santa Rufina (died 1190).

== See also ==
- Catholic Church in Italy
