= Eiman =

Period of Japanese history (1165–1166 CE)

Eiman (永万) was a Japanese era name (年号, nengō; lit. "year name") after Chōkan and before Nin'an. This period spanned the years from June 1165 through August 1166. The reigning emperor was Emperor Rokujō-tennō (六条天皇).

== Change of era ==
- February 13, 1165 Eiman gannen (永万元年): The new era name was created to mark an event or series of events. The previous era ended and a new one commenced in Chōkan 3, on the 5th day of the 6th month in the year 1165.

== Events of the Eiman era ==
- 1165 (Eiman 1): The infant son of Emperor Nijō was named heir apparent; and this Crown Prince will soon become Emperor Rokujō.
- August 3, 1165 (Eiman 1, 25th day of the 6th month): In the 7th year of Emperor Nijō's reign (二条天皇7年), the emperor fell so very ill that he abdicated, and the succession (senso) was received by his son. Shortly thereafter, Emperor Rokujō is said to have acceded to the throne (sokui).
- September 4, 1165 (Eiman 1, 27th day of the 7th month): The former-Emperor Nijō died at age 22.

== Notes ==
Preceded by Chōkan	Era or nengō Eiman; 1165–1166	Succeeded by Nin'an
