= Benedict of York =

English moneylender

Benedict of York (died 1189) was a moneylender and a leading member of the 12th-century Jewish community in York, England. Benedict was considered the second-greatest moneylender in York after Josce of York. Benedict acquired several lands as a result of his activities, and debts to him were still being honoured a decade after his death.

Benedict attended the coronation of King Richard I along with Josce of York and was forcibly baptised as "William" during the subsequent attacks on the Jewry of London at Richard's coronation. Benedict was severely wounded in the attack and accepted a Christian baptism from a monk from York, Prior William of St. Mary's Abbey. Benedict recanted his Christian faith the next day when summoned before King Richard. The Archbishop of Canterbury, Baldwin of Forde, said of Benedict's recantation that "...if he will not be a Christian, let him be the devil's man". Benedict later appealed to King Richard to allow him to return to his Jewish faith, though this was against canon law.

He died in Northampton soon after his forced baptism. The chronicler Roger of Hoveden said that Benedict was buried in neither the Jewish nor Christian cemetery in Northampton following his death as a result of his recantation. Benedict's house at Spen Lane was described by William of Newbury as like "unto a royal palace in size and strength". Benedict's children and his widow were burned alive in his house during the Easter York riot in 1190.
