= Jacob of Orléans =

12th-century Jewish scholar

Jacob of Orléans (died 3 September 1189) was a noted Jewish scholar. Jacob was a tosafist in Orléans, France, who studied under Rabbenu Tam. He remained in Orléans until at least 1171, leaving at a later date to go to London, most likely to become a teacher. Jacob was killed during the antisemitic riots that swept through London during the coronation of King Richard I.
