= Fujiwara no Motozane =

Japanese poet and nobleman (1143–1166)

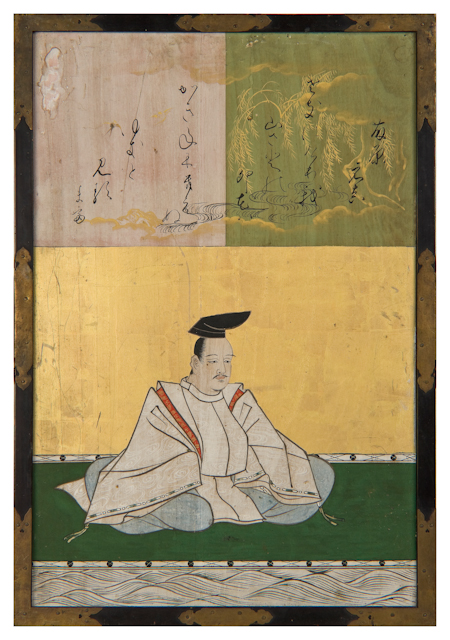
Fujiwara no Motozane by Kanō Yasunobu, 1648

Fujiwara no Motozane (藤原 元真 1143–1166) was a middle Heian period waka poet and Japanese nobleman. He is designated as a member of the Thirty-six Poetry Immortals.

Motozane's poems are included in several imperial poetry anthologies, including the Shin Kokin Wakashū. A personal poetry collection known as the Motozane-shū also remains.
