= Emperor Rokujō =

Emperor of Japan from 1165 to 1168

Emperor Rokujō 六条天皇
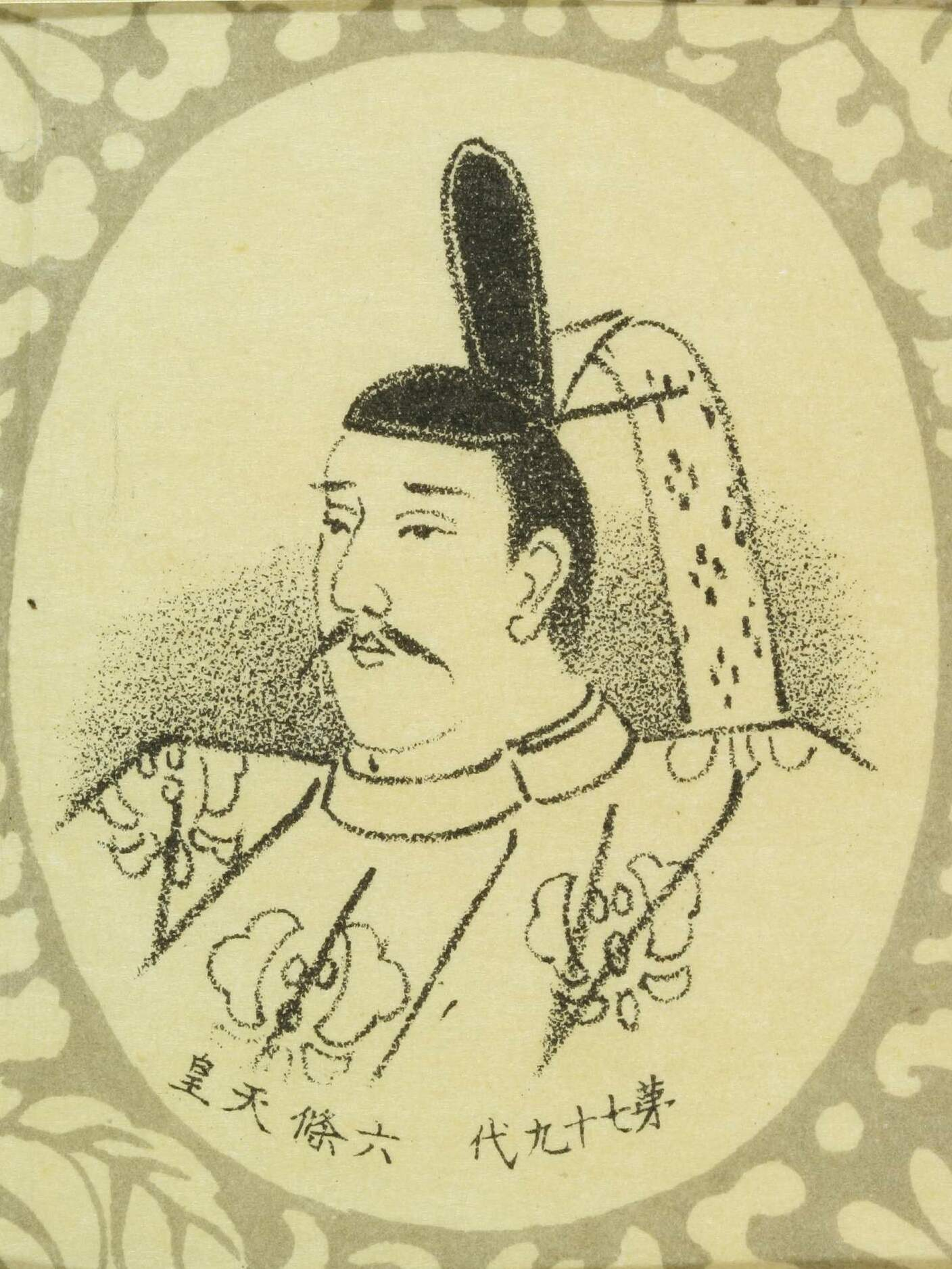
- Imaginary portrait by Kōtarō Miyake, c. 1894

Emperor of Japan
- Reign: August 3, 1165 – April 9, 1168
- Enthronement: September 4, 1165
- Predecessor: Nijō
- Successor: Takakura
- Born: December 28, 1164
- Died: August 23, 1176 (aged 11); Higashiyama-tei mansion (東山第)
- Burial: Seikan-ji no Misasagi (清閑寺陵) (Kyoto)
Posthumous name
- Tsuigō: Emperor Rokujō (六条院 or 六条天皇)
- House: Imperial House of Japan
- Father: Emperor Nijō

Emperor Rokujō (六条天皇, Rokujō-tennō; December 28, 1164 – August 23, 1176) was the 79th emperor of Japan, according to the traditional order of succession. His reign spanned the years from 1165 through 1168.

== Genealogy ==
Before his ascension to the Chrysanthemum Throne, his personal name (his imina) was Nobuhito-shinnō (順仁). He was as Yoshihito- or Toshihito-shinnō.

He was the son of Emperor Nijō. He left no children.

== Events of Rokujō's life ==
He was made Crown Prince before his first birthday, and was enthroned at the age of 8 months.

- 1165 (Eiman 1): The infant son of Emperor Nijō was named heir apparent (and this Crown Prince will soon become Emperor Rokujō.
- 1165 (Eiman 1, 25th day of the 6th month): In the 7th year of Nijō-tennō's reign (二条天皇七年), the emperor fell so very ill that he abdicated; and the succession (senso) was received by his son. Shortly thereafter, Emperor Rokujō is said to have acceded to the throne (sokui).
- 1165 (Eiman 1, 27th–28th day of the 7th month): The former- Emperor Nijō died at age 22.

He was pressured by the Taira clan to abdicate in favor of his uncle, who became Emperor Takakura.

- 1168 (Nin'an 3, 19th day of the 2nd month): In the 3rd year of Rokujō-tennō's reign (六条天皇三年), the emperor was deposed by his grandfather, and the succession (‘‘senso’’) was received by his uncle, the seventh son of the retired-Emperor Go-Shirakawa.
- 1168 (Nin'an 3, 19th day of the 2nd month): Emperor Takakura is said to have acceded to the throne (‘‘sokui’’), and he is proclaimed emperor.
- 1168 (Nin'an 3, 20th day of the 3rd month): Takakura succeeds Rokujo on the Chrysanthemum Throne.

Rokujō died of dysentery at the age of eleven. Because of his youth, he had neither consorts nor children. Government affairs were run by his grandfather, Retired Emperor Go-Shirakawa as cloistered emperor. His imperial mausoleum is designated as Seikanji no misasagi (清閑寺陵), located in Higashiyama-ku, Kyoto.

=== Kugyō ===
Kugyō (公卿) is a collective term for the very few most powerful men attached to the court of the Emperor of Japan in pre-Meiji eras.

In general, this elite group included only three to four men at a time. These were hereditary courtiers whose experience and background would have brought them to the pinnacle of a life's career. During Rokujō's reign, this apex of the Daijō-kan included:

- Sesshō, Konoe Motozane, 1143–1166.
- Sesshō, Matsu Motofusa, 1144–1230.
- Daijō-daijin, Fujiwara Koremichi 1093–1165.
- Daijō-daijin, Taira Kiyomori, 1118–1181.
- Sadaijin, Matsu Motofusa.
- Sadaijin, Ōinomikado Tsunemune, 1119–1189.
- Udaijin, Kujō Kanezane, 1149–1207.
- Nadaijin, Fujiwara Tadamasa.
- Dainagon

== Eras of Emperor Rokujō's reign ==
The years of Rokujō's reign are more specifically identified by more than one era name or nengō.

- Eiman (1165–1166)
- Nin'an (1166–1169)

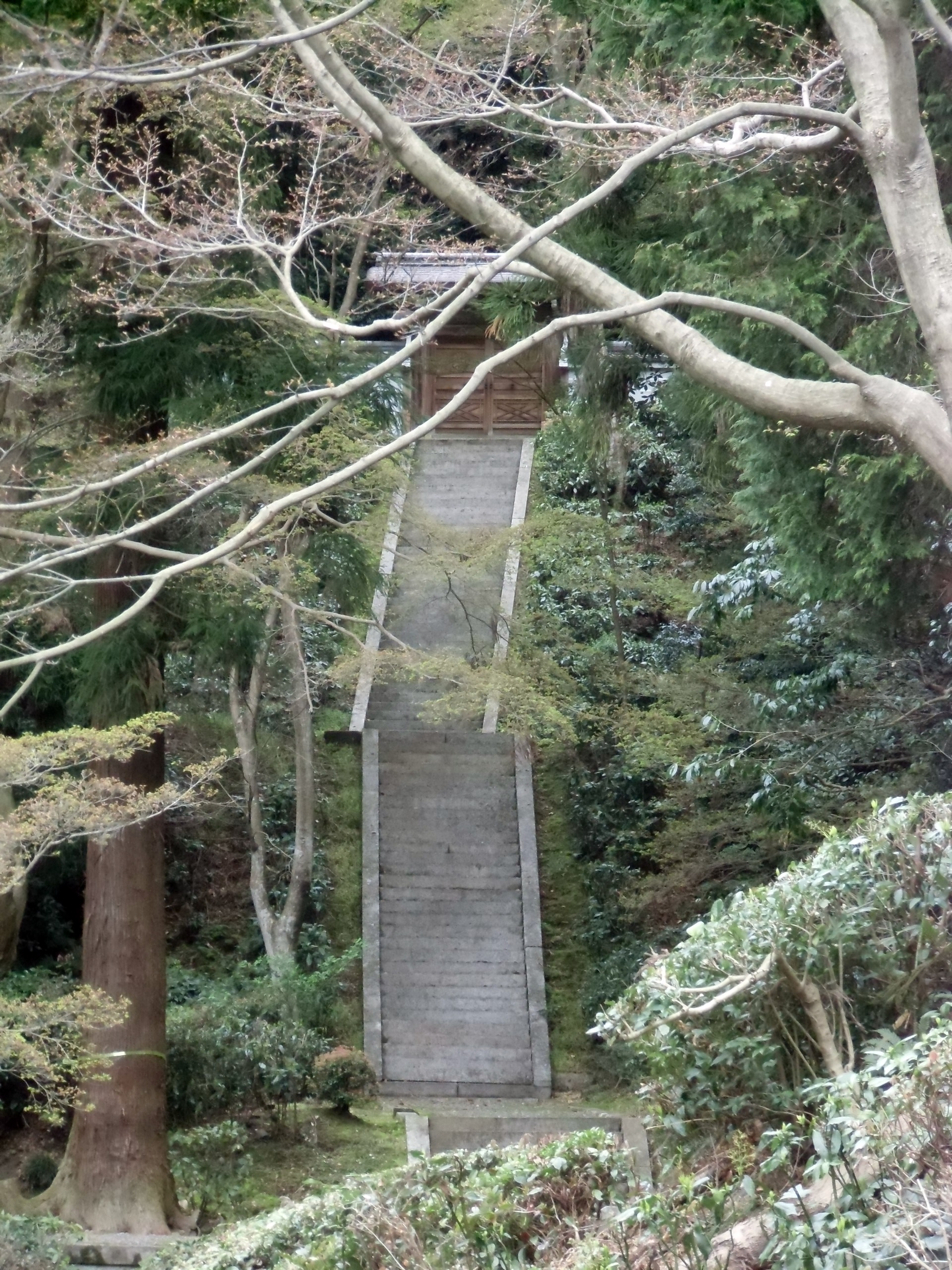
Tombs of Emperor Rokujo.

== Ancestry ==
Ancestors of Emperor Rokujō

8. Emperor Toba (1103-1156)
4. Emperor Go-Shirakawa (1127-1192)
9. Fujiwara no Tamako (1101-1145)
2. Emperor Nijō (1143-1165)
10. Fujiwara no Tsunezane (1068-1131)
5. Minamoto no Yoshiko (1116-1143)
11. Fujiwara no Kimiko (b. 1087?)
1. Emperor Rokujō
3. Ōkura-daisuke

== See also ==
- Emperor of Japan
- List of Emperors of Japan
- Imperial cult

== Notes ==
Japanese Imperial kamon — a stylized chrysanthemum blossom

Regnal titles
Preceded by Emperor Nijō	Emperor of Japan: Rokujō; 1165–1168	Succeeded by Emperor Takakura
