= Hōgen (era) =

Period of Japanese history (1156–1159 CE)

Hōgen (保元) was a Japanese era name (年号, nengō; lit. "year name") after Kyūju and before Heiji. This period spanned the years from April 1156 through April 1159. The reigning emperors were Emperor Go-Shirakawa-tennō (後白河天皇) and Emperor Nijō-tennō (二条天皇).

== Change of era ==
- January 24, 1156 Hōgen gannen (保元元年): The new era name was created to mark an event or series of events. The previous era ended and a new one commenced in Kyūju 3, on the 24th day of the 4th month of 1156.

== Events of the Hōgen era ==
- July 20, 1156 (Hōgen 1, 2nd day of the 7th month): Cloistered Emperor Toba-in died at age 54.
- July 28–August 16, 1156 (Hōgen 1, 10th-29th days of the 7th month): The Hōgen Rebellion, also known as the Hōgen Insurrection or the Hōgen War.
- 1156 (Hōgen 1, 9th month): The naidaijin Fujiwara Saneyoshi was named sadaijin. The dainagon Fujiwara Koremichi became naidaijin. After the war, tranquility was restored throughout the empire; and the emperor himself was in charge of the government. A special building was constructed in Kyoto, where—as in the days of Emperor Go-Sanjo, requests and complaints were received and examined.
- 1157 (Hōgen 2, 8th month): Sanjō Saneyuki was dismissed from his position as daijō-daijin; and in the same month, the sadaijin Saneyoshi died. The udaijin Fujiwara no Munesuke was made daijō-daijin. The naidaijin Koremichi was made sadaijin. Fujiwara no Moresane, who was the 15-year-old son of son of kampaku Fujiwara no Tadamichi, became udaijin. The dainagon Sanjō Kinori, who was the son of Saneyuki, obtained the position of naidaijin.
- 1157 (Hōgen 2, 10th month): The foundations are laid for a grand audience hall (dairi) in the palace. There had not been such a structure within the palace compound since the time of Emperor Shirakawa.
- August 6, 1158 (Hōgen 3, 11th day of the 8th month): In the 3rd year of Go-Shirakawa's reign (後白河天皇25年), the emperor abdicated; and the succession (senso) was received by his eldest son.
- 1158 (Hōgen 4, 8th month): Emperor Nijō is said to have acceded to the throne (sokui).

== Notes ==
Preceded by Kyūju	Era or nengō Hōgen; 1156–1159	Succeeded by Heiji
