= Pietro Pettinaio =

Blessed Pietro Pettinaio TOSF
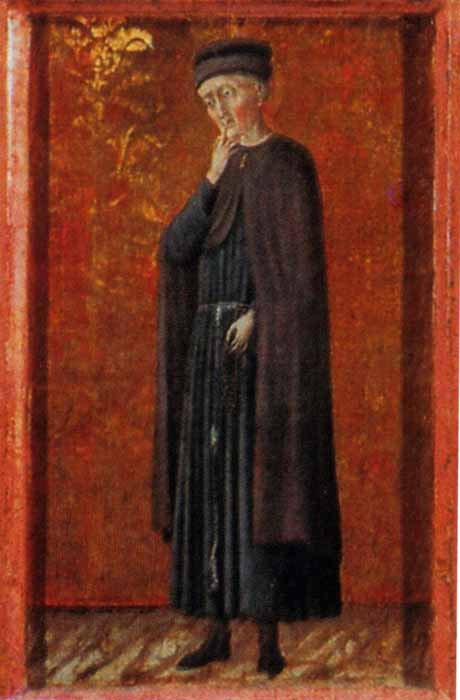
- Portrait c. 1445.
- Born: c. 1189; Campi, Republic of Florence (Castelnuovo Berardenga)
- Died: 4 December 1289 (aged 100); Siena, Republic of Siena
- Venerated in: Roman Catholic Church
- Beatified: 18 August 1802, Saint Peter's Basilica, Papal States by Pope Pius VII
- Feast: 4 December
- Attributes: Comb, finger on the lips for silence, Franciscan habit

Pietro Pettinaio (c. 1189 - 4 December 1289) was an Italian member of the Third Order of Saint Francis who worked as a comb-maker. He was well known both for his trade and for his decision to remain in silence while living among the Franciscans. He became known for his charisma and for his care of both the poor and the ill and was honored as a saint during his lifetime by the people of Siena.

He was beatified on 18 August 1802 after Pope Pius VII confirmed his veneration in Siena and in the surrounding cities.

== Life ==
Pietro Pettinaio was born around 1189 in Campi, a village of Castelnuovo Berardenga near Siena and moved with his parents to Siena at some point during his childhood.

He married but remained childless during his marriage and in order to provide for his new wife he worked as a comb-maker. He purchased a house in which vines flourished so as to make wine. Pettinaio later lost his wife and he lived alone in Siena while being able to devote more time to his trade.

Pettinaio became a member of the Third Order of Saint Francis after serving as a nurse in a Franciscan-run hospital - Santa Maria della Scala - while continuing in his profession. He lived a simple life, giving excess wealth to the Franciscans and he spent his evenings in meditation and devoting such nights to God. He moved from his home (after selling it to the poor) to a cell among the Franciscans and there considered himself far too talkative, so worked towards living amongst them in silence. He undertook several pilgrimages to religious sites including Assisi, where Saint Francis of Assisi worked and lived.

During his lifetime he was hailed as a miracle worker and was considered to be a great saint. He became a sought after advisor to priests as well as to the people of Siena and was considered charismatic. He was so well-regarded to the point where in 1282 he was granted the chance to choose five prisoners to be pardoned. He saw as an advisor the Dominican orator Ambrose Sansedoni.

Pettinaio died on 4 December 1289 at an advanced age and was buried at the Franciscan church in Siena. His grave soon became a pilgrimage site and the scene of miracles. A shrine was built over his grave in 1326 and an annual local feast in his honor was established in 1329. The shrine was lost to fire in 1655 and remaining relics were preserved when the Poor Clare nuns took them into their care. The poet Dante Alighieri included Pettinaio in his work (Divina Commedia) in Purgatorio, Canto XIII.128, where he mentions the efficacy of his prayers.

== Beatification ==
The people adored Pettinaio as a saint and a patron and so established a local annual feast honoring him in 1329. It later led to calls for official recognition of sainthood and led to Pope Pius VII proclaiming his "cultus" acting as formal beatification on 18 August 1802.
