= Grade I listed buildings in Cambridge =

There are 67 Grade I listed buildings in Cambridge, England. In the United Kingdom, a listed building is a building or structure of special historical or architectural importance. These buildings are legally protected from demolition, as well as from any extensions or alterations that would adversely affect the building's character or destroy historic features. Listed buildings in England are divided into three categories—Grade II buildings are buildings of special interest; Grade II* buildings are Grade II buildings of particular interest; and Grade I buildings, which are those of "exceptional" interest. Only around two per cent of listed buildings are given Grade I status.

Cambridge is a university town located in East Anglia, England. It is home to the University of Cambridge, founded in 1209, and many of the listed buildings are part of the university or its constituent colleges.

St Bene't's Church is the oldest surviving building in the city, dating back to the 11th century. The oldest secular building is the School of Pythagoras, built around 1200 and now a part of St John's college. Both of these are Grade I listed.

== List ==
Name	Location	Type	Completed (Note: The date given is the date used by Historic England as significant for the initial building or that of an important part in the structure's description.)	Date designated	Grid ref. (Note: The grid reference is based on the British national grid reference system, sometimes known as OSGB36, used by the Ordnance Survey.) Geo-coordinates	Entry number (Note: The "List Entry Number" is a unique number assigned to each listed building and scheduled monument by Historic England.)	Image
All Saints Church	Jesus Lane	Parish church	1863–64	27 January 2011	TL 45177 58791; 52°12′30″N 0°07′24″E	1126204	All Saints Church More images
Chapel of St Mary Magdalene/Stourbridge Chapel/Leper Chapel	Newmarket Road	Chapel	Mid-12th century	26 April 1950	TL 47163 59483; 52°12′50″N 0°09′09″E	1126144	Chapel of St Mary Magdalene/Stourbridge Chapel/Leper Chapel More images
Chesterton Tower	Chapel Street, Chesterton	House	Mid-14th century	2 November 1972	TL 46294 59804; 52°13′01″N 0°08′24″E	1331829	Chesterton Tower More images
Christ's College Bathing Pool, including the busts of Cudworth, Milton and Saunderson and stone vase in Memory of Joseph Mede	Christ's College	Bath house	Before 1688	26 April 1950	TL 45229 58644; 52°12′25″N 0°07′26″E	1125548	Christ's College Bathing Pool, including the busts of Cudworth, Milton and Saunderson and stone vase in Memory of Joseph Mede
Christ's College, Fellows Building	Christ's College	College lodgings	1640–42	26 April 1950	TL 45179 58531; 52°12′21″N 0°07′23″E	1320286	Christ's College, Fellows Building More images
Christ's College, the buildings surrounding Entrance Court, with the south-east range of Second Court	Christ's College	Gate	16th century	26 April 1950	TL 45099 58461; 52°12′19″N 0°07′19″E	1332166	Christ's College, the buildings surrounding Entrance Court, with the south-east range of Second Court More images
Church of Our Lady and the English Martyrs	Hills Road/Lensfield Road	Roman Catholic church	1887–90	26 April 1950 (upgraded to Grade I 8 November 2022)	TL4549257744; 52°11′55″N 0°07′39″E	1349061	Church of Our Lady and the English Martyrs More images
Church of St Andrew	High Street, Cherry Hinton	Church	Late 12th century	26 April 1950	TL 48971 57096; 52°11′31″N 0°10′41″E	1126191	Church of St Andrew More images
Church of St Andrew	Church Street, Chesterton	Church	14th century	2 November 1972	TL 46279 59623; 52°12′55″N 0°08′23″E	1112541	Church of St Andrew More images
Church of St Bene't	Bene't Street/Free School Lane	Church	Early 11th century	2 November 1972	TL 44855 58278; 52°12′13″N 0°07′06″E	1126252	Church of St Bene't More images
Church of St Botolph	Trumpington Street/Botolph Lane	Church	14th century	26 April 1950	TL 44843 58142; 52°12′09″N 0°07′05″E	1331905	Church of St Botolph More images
Church of St Mary and St Michael	Grantchester Road, Trumpington	Church	Late 12th/early 13th century	26 April 1950	TL 44282 54951; 52°10′26″N 0°06′31″E	1081526	Church of St Mary and St Michael More images
Church of St Mary the Great	Market Hill	Church	Early 14th century	2 November 1972	TL 44846 58460; 52°12′19″N 0°07′06″E	1126084	Church of St Mary the Great More images
Church of St Michael	Trinity Street	Parish hall	Change of Use	26 April 1950	TL 44848 58534; 52°12′22″N 0°07′06″E	1126061	Church of St Michael More images
Church of the Holy Sepulchre (The Round Church)	Bridge Street/Round Church Street	Church	First half of 12th century	26 April 1950	TL 44883 58807; 52°12′30″N 0°07′08″E	1126260	Church of the Holy Sepulchre (The Round Church) More images
Clare College, Clare Bridge	Clare College	Bridge	1640	26 April 1950	TL 44557 58413; 52°12′18″N 0°06′50″E	1125549	Clare College, Clare Bridge More images
Clare College, gates and railings to Trinity Hall Lane	Clare College	Gate	1714	26 April 1950	TL 44691 58430; 52°12′18″N 0°06′58″E	1125550	Clare College, gates and railings to Trinity Hall Lane More images
Clare College gateway on west side of Clare Bridge with flanking railings and gates to College Garden	Clare College	Gate	1714	26 April 1950	TL 44543 58411; 52°12′18″N 0°06′50″E	1125551	Clare College gateway on west side of Clare Bridge with flanking railings and gates to College Garden More images
Clare College, the buildings surrounding the Fore and Principal Courts	Clare College	University college	1638–41	26 April 1950	TL 44665 58427; 52°12′18″N 0°06′56″E	1320280	Clare College, the buildings surrounding the Fore and Principal Courts More images
Corpus Christi College, the buildings surrounding the Old and New Courts including the Master's Lodge	Corpus Christi College	University college	1352–76	26 April 1950	TL 44852 58220; 52°12′11″N 0°07′06″E	1125553	Corpus Christi College, the buildings surrounding the Old and New Courts including the Master's Lodge More images
Downing College, the east and west ranges, including the Hall, the Master's Lodge and the East and West Lodges	Downing College	University college	Founded 1800	26 April 1950	TL 45204 57907; 52°12′01″N 0°07′24″E	1125517	Downing College, the east and west ranges, including the Hall, the Master's Lodge and the East and West Lodges More images
Emmanuel College, buildings surrounding Front and New Courts and the Brick Building	Emmanuel College	Gate	1775	26 April 1950	TL 45235 58308; 52°12′14″N 0°07′26″E	1332193	Emmanuel College, buildings surrounding Front and New Courts and the Brick Building More images
Fitzwilliam Museum	Trumpington Street	Museum	1837–47	26 April 1950	TL 44946 57882; 52°12′00″N 0°07′10″E	1126276	Fitzwilliam Museum More images
Fence along street frontage of the main block of the Fitzwilliam Museum	Trumpington Street	Balustrade	1841–42	2 November 1972	TL 44964 57907; 52°12′01″N 0°07′11″E	1126277	Fence along street frontage of the main block of the Fitzwilliam Museum More images
Gonville and Caius College, the buildings surrounding Gonville Court and Caius Court including the Hall, Chapel, Master's Lodge and Gate of Virtue, but excluding the Gate of Honour	Gonville and Caius College	University college	1567	26 April 1950	TL 44763 58534; 52°12′22″N 0°07′01″E	1320425	Gonville and Caius College, the buildings surrounding Gonville Court and Caius Court including the Hall, Chapel, Master's Lodge and Gate of Virtue, but excluding the Gate of Honour More images
Gonville and Caius College, the Gate of Honour and Flanking Walls	Gonville and Caius College	Gate	1575	26 April 1950	TL 44759 58494; 52°12′20″N 0°07′01″E	1125526	Gonville and Caius College, the Gate of Honour and Flanking Walls More images
Gonville and Caius College, the Gate of Humility	Gonville and Caius College	Gate	1565	26 April 1950	TL 44740 58500; 52°12′21″N 0°07′00″E	1125527	Gonville and Caius College, the Gate of Humility More images
Jesus College, North Range of Outer Court	Jesus College	University college	1638–40	26 April 1950	TL 45180 58933; 52°12′34″N 0°07′24″E	1139049	Jesus College, North Range of Outer Court More images
Jesus College, the buildings surrounding Cloister and Outer Courts, and the east range of Pump Court (excluding the North Range of Outer Court)	Jesus College	Kitchen	c.1500	26 April 1950	TL 45202 58890; 52°12′33″N 0°07′25″E	1125529	Jesus College, the buildings surrounding Cloister and Outer Courts, and the east range of Pump Court (excluding the North Range of Outer Court) More images
King's College Chapel	King's College	College chapel	Founded 1440	26 April 1950	TL 44728 58395; 52°12′17″N 0°06′59″E	1139003	King's College Chapel More images
King's College, Fellows' Building/Gibbs' Building	King's College	College lodgings	1724–31	26 April 1950	TL 44692 58333; 52°12′15″N 0°06′57″E	1125533	King's College, Fellows' Building/Gibbs' Building More images
King's College, King's Bridge	King's College	Bridge	1818	26 April 1950	TL 44567 58278; 52°12′14″N 0°06′51″E	1125535	King's College, King's Bridge More images
King's College, screens and entrance gateway on King's Parade	King's College	Gate	1824	26 April 1950	TL 44780 58346; 52°12′16″N 0°07′02″E	1125532	King's College, screens and entrance gateway on King's Parade More images
King's College, south range of First Court, including the Library and the former Provost's Lodge	King's College	College lodgings	1824–28	26 April 1950	TL 44743 58287; 52°12′14″N 0°07′00″E	1139452	King's College, south range of First Court, including the Library and the former Provost's Lodge More images
Little Trinity	16 Jesus Lane	House	c.1725	26 April 1950	TL 44980 58837; 52°12′31″N 0°07′13″E	1331853	Little Trinity More images
Garden walls, railings and gates of Number 16 (Little Trinity)	16 Jesus Lane	Gate	Early 18th century	26 April 1950	TL 44984 58814; 52°12′31″N 0°07′14″E	1099109	Garden walls, railings and gates of Number 16 (Little Trinity)
Magdalene College, Pepys Building	Magdalene College	Library	1670–1703	2 November 1972	TL 44734 59055; 52°12′39″N 0°07′01″E	1332183	Magdalene College, Pepys Building More images
Magdalene College, the buildings surrounding First Court	Magdalene College	University college	Completed 1575	26 April 1950	TL 44682 58992; 52°12′37″N 0°06′58″E	1125500	Magdalene College, the buildings surrounding First Court More images
5, Market Hill	Market Hill	House	Late 17th century	26 April 1950	TL 44937 58471; 52°12′19″N 0°07′11″E	1331862	5, Market Hill More images
Pembroke College, the buildings surrounding Old Court (except the Chapel and Cloister) and Ivy Court	Pembroke College	University college	14th century	26 April 1950	TL 44862 58069; 52°12′07″N 0°07′06″E	1087104	Pembroke College, the buildings surrounding Old Court (except the Chapel and Cloister) and Ivy Court More images
Pembroke College, the Chapel with Hitcham's Cloister	Pembroke College	University college	1663–65	26 April 1950	TL 44892 58042; 52°12′06″N 0°07′07″E	1125509	Pembroke College, the Chapel with Hitcham's Cloister More images
Peterhouse, entrance screen to First Court	Peterhouse	Gate	1751	2 November 1972	TL 44900 57982; 52°12′04″N 0°07′08″E	1125514	Peterhouse, entrance screen to First Court More images
Peterhouse, the buildings surrounding First Court, Old Court and Gisborne Court	Peterhouse	Kitchen	c.1460	26 April 1950	TL 44833 57943; 52°12′03″N 0°07′04″E	1087054	Peterhouse, the buildings surrounding First Court, Old Court and Gisborne Court More images
Peterhouse, the Master's Lodge	Peterhouse	College lodgings	1702	26 April 1950	TL 44933 58002; 52°12′04″N 0°07′10″E	1087070	Peterhouse, the Master's Lodge More images
Peterhouse, gates and piers of the Master's Lodge	Peterhouse	Gate	1702	2 November 1972	TL 44911 57989; 52°12′04″N 0°07′08″E	1332192	Peterhouse, gates and piers of the Master's Lodge More images
Queens' College, the buildings surrounding Front Court, Cloister Court, Pump Court and Walnut Tree Court	Queens' College	University college	1449	26 April 1950	TL 44715 58145; 52°12′09″N 0°06′58″E	1087041	Queens' College, the buildings surrounding Front Court, Cloister Court, Pump Court and Walnut Tree Court More images
School of Pythagoras	Northampton Street/St John's College	First-floor hall house	Late 12th or early 13th century	26 April 1950	TL 44498 58944; 52°12′35″N 0°06′48″E	1126114	School of Pythagoras More images
Sidney Sussex College, the buildings surrounding Hall Court and Chapel Court	Sidney Sussex College	University college	16th and 17th centuries	26 April 1950	TL 44988 58679; 52°12′26″N 0°07′14″E	1106237	Sidney Sussex College, the buildings surrounding Hall Court and Chapel Court More images
St Catharine's College, the buildings surrounding Principal Court	St Catharine's College	University college	1687	26 April 1950	TL 44726 58183; 52°12′10″N 0°06′59″E	1125480	St Catharine's College, the buildings surrounding Principal Court More images
St Catharine's College, the railings, piers, gateway and screen wall on the east side of Principal Court	St Catharine's College	Gate	c.1780	26 April 1950	TL 44786 58198; 52°12′11″N 0°07′02″E	1332213	St Catharine's College, the railings, piers, gateway and screen wall on the east side of Principal Court More images
St John's College, Old Bridge (also known as Kitchen Bridge or Wren Bridge)	St John's College	Bridge	1709–12	26 April 1950	TL 44659 58756; 52°12′29″N 0°06′56″E	1125486	St John's College, Old Bridge (also known as Kitchen Bridge or Wren Bridge) More images
St John's College, gateway and piers adjoining the Old Bridge	St John's College	Gate	1712	26 April 1950	TL 44670 58753; 52°12′29″N 0°06′57″E	1125489	St John's College, gateway and piers adjoining the Old Bridge More images
St John's College, gateway to kitchen yard to east of Old Bridge	St John's College	Gate	1711–12	26 April 1950	TL 44689 58747; 52°12′29″N 0°06′58″E	1125488	St John's College, gateway to kitchen yard to east of Old Bridge More images
St John's College, gateway to St John's Street to south of the college buildings	St John's College	Gate	Early 16th century	26 April 1950	TL 44801 58700; 52°12′27″N 0°07′04″E	1332179	St John's College, gateway to St John's Street to south of the college buildings More images
St John's College, New Bridge (Bridge of Sighs)	St John's College	Bridge	1827	26 April 1950	TL 44666 58797; 52°12′30″N 0°06′57″E	1326664	St John's College, New Bridge (Bridge of Sighs) More images
St John's College, New Court	St John's College	University college	1826–31	26 April 1950	TL 44614 58836; 52°12′32″N 0°06′54″E	1332178	St John's College, New Court More images
St John's College, the buildings surrounding the First, Second and Third Courts	St John's College	Kitchen	Adapted 19th century	26 April 1950	TL 44761 58752; 52°12′29″N 0°07′02″E	1332216	St John's College, the buildings surrounding the First, Second and Third Courts More images
The Cockerell Building (formerly Squire Law Library)	Gonville and Caius College	Library	1837–40	26 April 1950	TL 44730 58480; 52°12′20″N 0°07′00″E	1121518	The Cockerell Building (formerly Squire Law Library) More images
The Law School and University Offices	The Old Schools	University	1754–58	26 April 1950	TL 44730 58432; 52°12′18″N 0°07′00″E	1126279	The Law School and University Offices More images
Senate House	The Old Schools	House	1722–30	26 April 1950	TL 44786 58482; 52°12′20″N 0°07′03″E	1322818	Senate House More images
Railings and gates round the Senate House	The Old Schools	Gate	Earlier	26 April 1950	TL 44809 58467; 52°12′19″N 0°07′04″E	1126280	Railings and gates round the Senate House More images
Trinity College, Bishop's Hostel	Trinity College	Hostel	1669–71	26 April 1950	TL 44698 58556; 52°12′22″N 0°06′58″E	1125498	Trinity College, Bishop's Hostel More images
Trinity College, Field Gates to Queen's Road	Trinity College	Gate	Erected in 1773, but of unknown earlier date	26 April 1950	TL 44414 58607; 52°12′24″N 0°06′43″E	1126266	Trinity College, Field Gates to Queen's Road More images
Trinity College, fountain in Great Court	Trinity College	Fountain	1602	26 April 1950	TL 44746 58636; 52°12′25″N 0°07′01″E	1331803	Trinity College, fountain in Great Court More images
Trinity College, Trinity Bridge	Trinity College	Bridge	1765	26 April 1950	TL 44542 58597; 52°12′24″N 0°06′50″E	1331804	Trinity College, Trinity Bridge More images
Trinity College, the buildings surrounding Great Court, Nevile's Court and New Court, and including King's Hostel	Trinity College	University college	1605	26 April 1950	TL 44696 58629; 52°12′25″N 0°06′58″E	1106371	Trinity College, the buildings surrounding Great Court, Nevile's Court and New Court, and including King's Hostel More images
Trinity Hall, the buildings surrounding Front Court, with the west range of South Court, the Master's Lodge and the Library	Trinity Hall	University college	Second half of 14th century	26 April 1950	TL 44658 58498; 52°12′21″N 0°06′56″E	1331807	Trinity Hall, the buildings surrounding Front Court, with the west range of South Court, the Master's Lodge and the Library More images

== See also ==
- Grade II* listed buildings in Cambridge
