= Thomas Gallus =

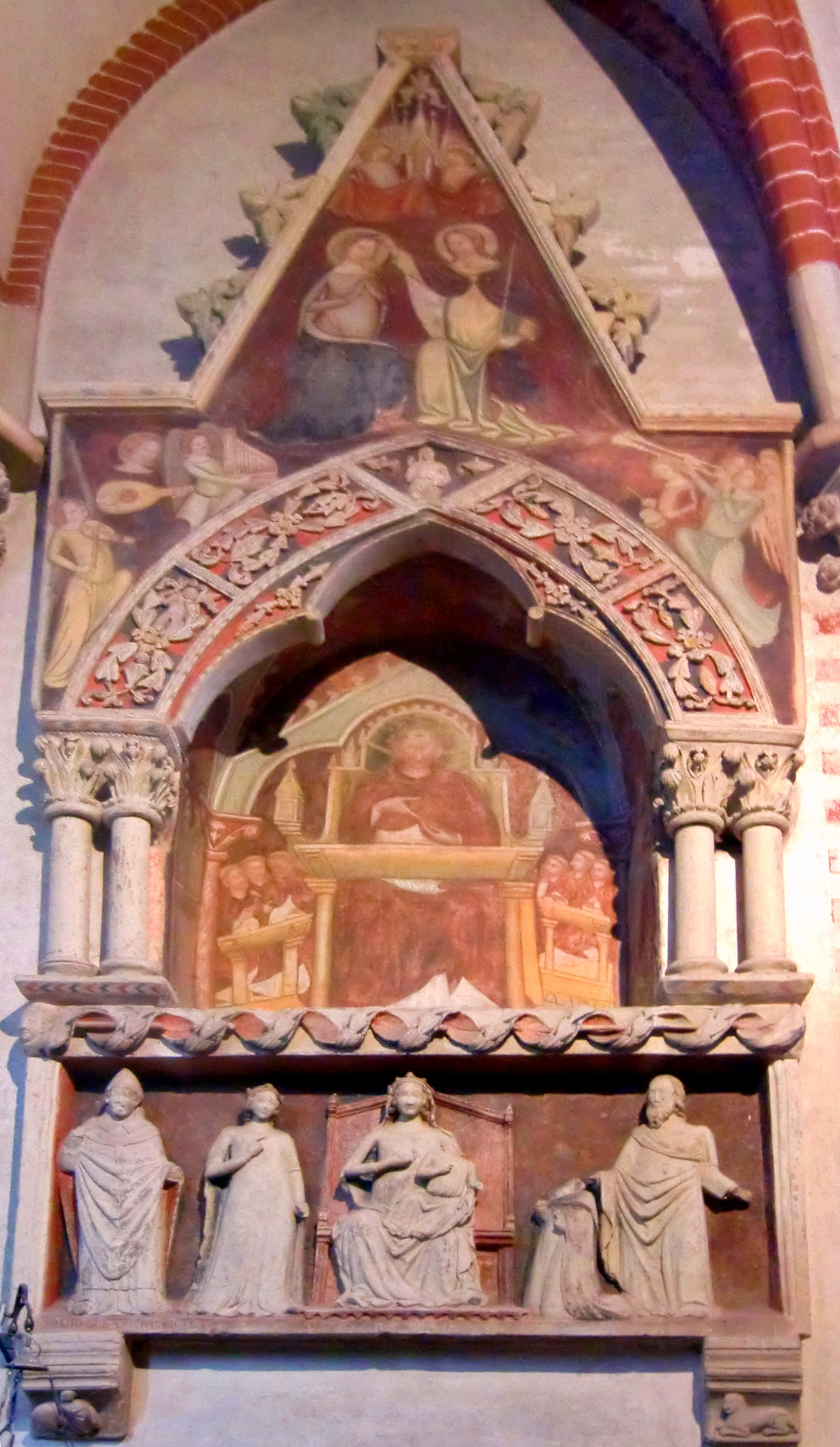
Tomb of Thomas Gallus in the Basilica of Sant'Andrea at Vercelli.

Thomas Gallus of Vercelli (c.1200 – 1246), sometimes in early twentieth century texts called Thomas of St Victor, Thomas of Vercelli or Thomas Vercellensis, was a French theologian, a member of the School of St Victor. He is known for his commentaries on Pseudo-Dionysius and his ideas on affective theology. His elaborate mystical schemata influenced Bonaventure and The Cloud of Unknowing.

== Life ==
Born sometime in the late twelfth century (his country of origin is disputed), Thomas Gallus departed from Paris, where he lectured in the university, and went to Vercelli in the north of Italy, along with three companions, to establish a new monastery there. By 1224/25, he was appointed abbot. This monastery was set up under the initiative of Cardinal Guala Bicchieri, once a papal legate to England and France. Moreover, Bicchieri was a native of Vercelli and wished to establish a monastery and hospital in his home town.

As abbot, Thomas devoted himself not just to the daily administrative tasks of the monastery, but also to composing various commentaries and expositions of the Bible and the writings of the Pseudo-Dionysius. He enjoyed a close relationship with the nascent Franciscan order; indeed, the Franciscans transferred their studium generale from Padua to Vercelli around 1228. He was personally acquainted with St Anthony of Padua. Gallus also knew Robert Grosseteste whom he may have met in 1238 when visiting England to secure a benefice associated with the church of St. Andrew's in Chesterton. Gallus and Grosseteste seem to have exchanged some writings through the agency of Grosseteste's associate, the Franciscan Adam Marsh. When war broke out between the Guelphs of Vercelli and the Ghibellines of the neighbouring town of Ivrea, Gallus was compelled to flee Vercelli in 1243 and take refuge in Ivrea after many grave accusations were made against him by the papal supporters. Some records however suggest that he did manage to return to Vercelli before his death in 1246.

A funerary monument to Gallus can be seen today in the Church of Sant’Andrea in Vercelli.

== Thought ==
Gallus wrote extensively between about 1218 and his death.

Thomas Gallus's interpretation of pseudo-Dionysius has in recent years been presented as one of two traditions of interpretation of Dionysius that emerged in the thirteenth century, with a 'speculative Dionysianism' developed by the Dominican Albert the Great, and an 'affective Dionysianism' first given systematic formulation in Gallus's interpretation of pseudo-Dionysius, but with great influence on later vernacular mystical writing. Specifically, this refers to the fact that in the contemporary debate on the relation between love and knowledge in mystical consciousness, Gallus held that affectivity tends to exclude (rather than simply subsume) human knowledge in the highest stages of the mystical itinerary.

== Works on Pseudo-Dionysius ==
- 1224: Glose super angelica ierarchia (Glosses on the Angelic Hierarchy).
- Before 1233: glosses on all four of Dionysius' works and two of the ten letters, made using the Latin translation of Dionysius by John Sarrazin. This included a commentary on the Mystical Theology typically known as the Exposition, Expositio or Exposicio.
- 1238: The Extractio, a translation and simplifying paraphrase of Pseudo-Dionysius's four treatises and his Letter to Titus. This was made using the translations of Dionysius made by Eriugena and John Sarrazin, intended to make them comprehensible to a wider audience.
- 1241-1244: The Explanatio (or Explanacio) of the works of Pseudo-Dionysius, Gallus's magnum opus. This is a full commentary on the whole Dionysian corpus, containing abundant references to the Scriptures, as well as cross-references to other passages in the Dionysian corpus.
- 1244-46: Spectacula contemplationis, a treatise on contemplation.
- 1244-46(?): Qualiter vita prelatorum conformari debet vite angelice (How the Life of Prelates Ought to Conform to the Angelic Life), a sermon which aims to encourage ecclesiastical characters to adopt the characteristics and functions of the nine orders of angels as a role model for their ministry.
- Super mentem exsultemus: a poetic sequence on the angels, possibly written by Gallus; at the very least, Gallus wrote a (lost) commentary on this sequence (date unknown).

== Biblical commentaries ==
Gallus's commentaries on Scripture include:

- Biblical Concordance, which Gallus calls Concordantie nostre (date unknown).
- 1218: Commentary on Isaiah (Vidi Dominum sedentem), or more probably on only a portion of Isaiah. Only a fragment of this commentary survives.
- ca. 1224: First Commentary on the Song of Songs, now lost.
- 1237/38: Second Commentary on the Song of Songs, covering Song 1.1-5.8.
- 1243: Third Commentary on the Song of Songs, a more extensive gloss on the entire Song.
- Sermon on Pentecost (Iam advenerat dies tertius), now lost.

== Modern editions ==
- James McEvoy (ed.), Mystical Theology: The Glosses by Thomas Gallus and the Commentary of Robert Grosseteste on «De Mystica Theologia» (Dallas Medieval Texts and Translations 3). Louvain and Paris: Peeters, 2003. ISBN 978-90-429-1310-3. It has however been argued that the Glosses attributed to Thomas Gallus in this volume are in fact not authentic writings by Gallus: see D. Lawell, 'Thomas Gallus's Method as Dionysian Commentator: A Study of the Glose super Angelica Ierarchia (1224), with Considerations on the Expositio librorum beati Dionysii', Archives d'histoire doctrinale et littéraire du Moyen Âge 76 (2009) 89-117.
- Denys Turner, Eros and Allegory: Medieval Exegesis of the Song of Songs, (Kalamazoo: Cistercian Publications, 1995), pp317–339 contains a partial translation of the Second Commentary on the Song of Songs.
- Thomas Gallus, Commentaires du Cantique des Cantiques, ed. Jeanne Barbet. Texte critique avec introduction, notes et tables (Paris: Vrin, 1967).
- D. Lawell, "Qualiter vita prelatorum conformari debet vite angelice: A Sermon (1244-1246?) Attributed to Thomas Gallus", Recherches de Théologie et Philosophie médiévales 75.2 (2008), 303–336.
- D. Lawell, "Spectacula contemplationis (1244-1246): A Treatise by Thomas Gallus", Recherches de Théologie et Philosophie médiévales 76.2 (2009), 249–285.
- D. Lawell (ed.): Thomas Gallus, Explanatio in libros Dionysii, Corpus Christianorum Continuatio Mediaevalis, vol. 223 (Turnhout: Brepols, 2011).
- D. Lawell (ed.): Thomas Gallus, Glose super angelica ierarchia. Accedunt indices ad Thomae Galli Opera, Corpus Christianorum Continuatio Mediaevalis, vol. 223A (Turnhout: Brepols, 2011).
- D. Lawell, Commentaries on the Angelic Hierarchy, Corpus Christianorum in Translation, 40 (Turnhout: Brepols, 2022).
- D. Lawell (ed.): Ps. Thomas Gallus, Three Writings on Mystical Theology: Exposition of the Mystical Theology, Commentary on the Canticle of Canticles, On the Seven Steps of Contemplation, Brepols Library of Christian Sources, 11 (Turnhout: Brepols, 2024).
