= Chesterton Tower =

Grade I listed building in Cambridge, United Kingdom

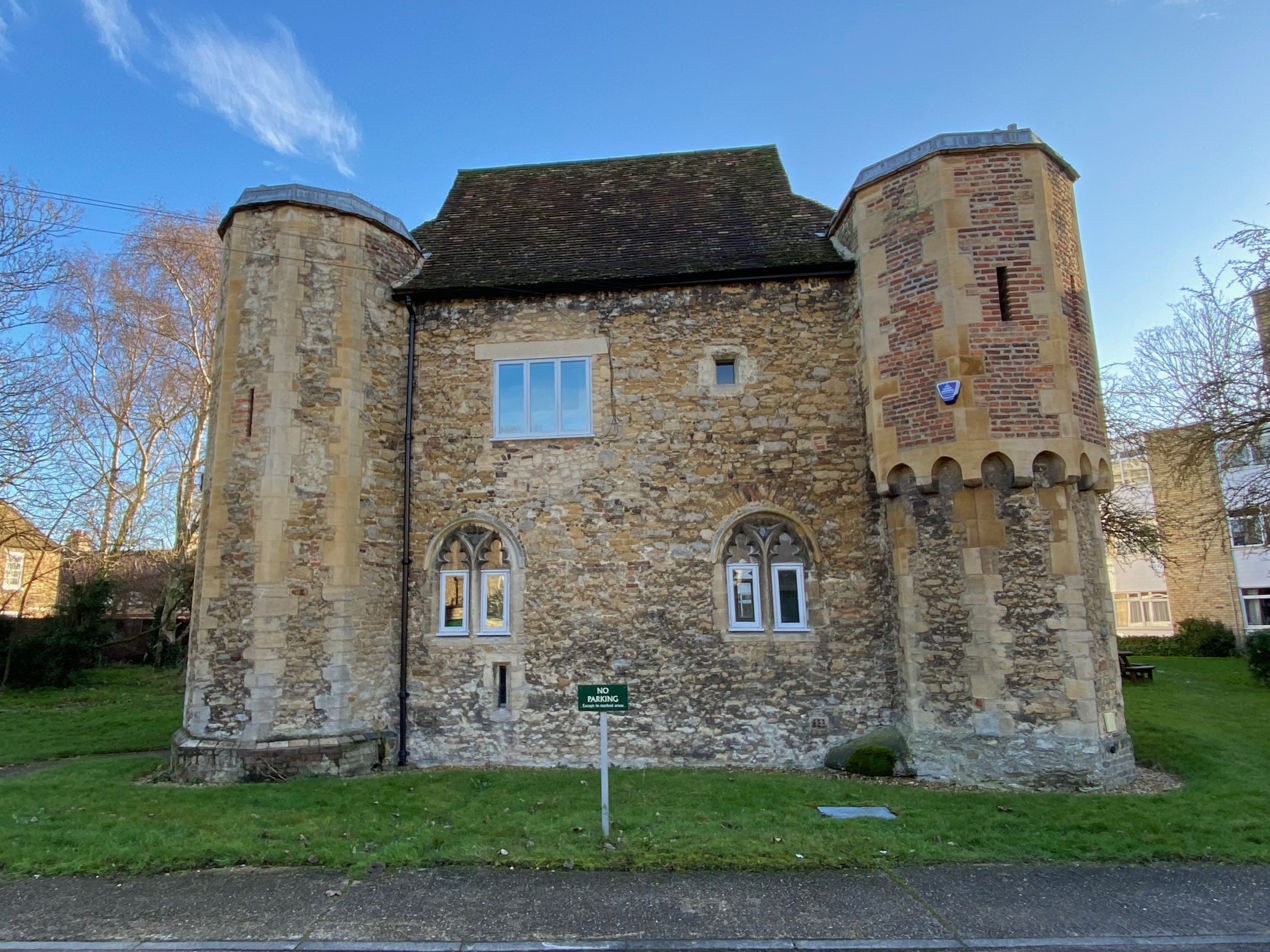
- Chesterton Tower

- Location of Chesterton Tower
- 52°13′01″N 0°08′24″E
- Location: Chesterton, Cambridge

History
- Built: 14th Century
- Built for: Henry III of England

Site notes
- Area: Cambridgeshire, England

Listed Building – Grade I
- Designated: 26-Apr-1950
- Reference no.: 1331829

Chesterton Tower is a Grade I listed medieval tower located in Chapel Street, Chesterton, Cambridge. The two-storey 14th-century tower is the former residence of Italian procurators of the abbot of Vercelli in Italy. It stands in the former vicarage garden of nearby St Andrew's Church, Chesterton. Built from field stones, clunch, brick and ashlar quoins, the tower is, unusually, not a fragment but a complete dwelling with vaulted ceilings, a spiral staircase and garderobe. The lower storey is vaulted in two bays with chamfered ribs and carved bosses. A restoration was completed in 1949.

In 1217 as an expression of gratitude for his assistance in preventing civil war, the Chesterton church was given by Henry III to the Papal Legate Cardinal Guala. He subsequently bestowed the buildings upon the abbey at Vercelli. A procurator, probably a canon of the abbey, resided at the tower and represented the foreign ownership. It is thought that the vicarage was probably a separate building.

In 1440 Henry VI gave these buildings to King's Hall, Cambridge which later became Henry VIII's Trinity College.

The tower is an uncommon survivor of a mid-14th-century dwelling.
