= Malcolm Bowie =

British academic

Malcolm Bowie

Malcolm McNaughtan Bowie FBA (/ˈboʊ.i/; 5 May 1943 – 28 January 2007) was a British academic, and Master of Christ's College, Cambridge from 2002 to 2006. An acclaimed scholar of French literature, Bowie wrote several books on Marcel Proust, as well as books on Mallarmé, Lacan, and psychoanalysis.

Born in Aldeburgh, Suffolk, Bowie attended Woodbridge School, and then studied at the University of Edinburgh where he gained an MA in 1965. He was awarded a DPhil at the University of Sussex in 1970. His research fields were French literature, psychoanalysis and the relationship between literature and the arts. He taught at the University of East Anglia (1967–69), Clare College, Cambridge (1969–76) and Queen Mary College, London.

Bowie was elected to the Christ's Mastership in 2002, after spending ten years as Marshal Foch Professor of French Literature and Fellow of All Souls College, Oxford. Before going on to the Faculty of Medieval and Modern Languages, University of Oxford, he held the Professorship of French Language and Literature at Queen Mary College (1976–92). While in London he was the Founding Director of the Institute of Romance Studies (1989–92), the School of Advanced Study, University of London. In December 2006, he vacated the Mastership because of ill health, and was made an Emeritus Fellow of Christ's. He was a Fellow of the British Academy and the Royal Society of Literature, an Honorary Member of the Modern Language Association of America, and an Officier dans l'Ordre des Palmes académiques. He served as President of the Society for French Studies, the British Comparative Literature Association, and the Association of University Professors of French, and held a Visiting Professorship at the University of California, Berkeley and a Visiting Distinguished Professorship at the CUNY Graduate Center in New York. The Malcom Bowie Bathing Pool at Christs, dating from the 17th century and believed to be the oldest outdoor swimming pool in the United Kingdom, is named in his honour.

His Proust Among The Stars (1998) won the 2001 Truman Capote Award for Literary Criticism.

== Selected contributions ==
=== Books ===
- Freud, Proust and Lacan: Theory as Fiction. Cambridge University Press, 1988. ISBN 9780521275880.
- Psychoanalysis and the Future of Theory. Wiley-Blackwell, 1993 ISBN 0-631-18925-4

Academic offices
Preceded by Alan Munro	Master of Christ's College, Cambridge; 2002–2006	Succeeded by Frank Kelly
