= St Andrew's Church, Chesterton =

St Andrew's Church Chesterton
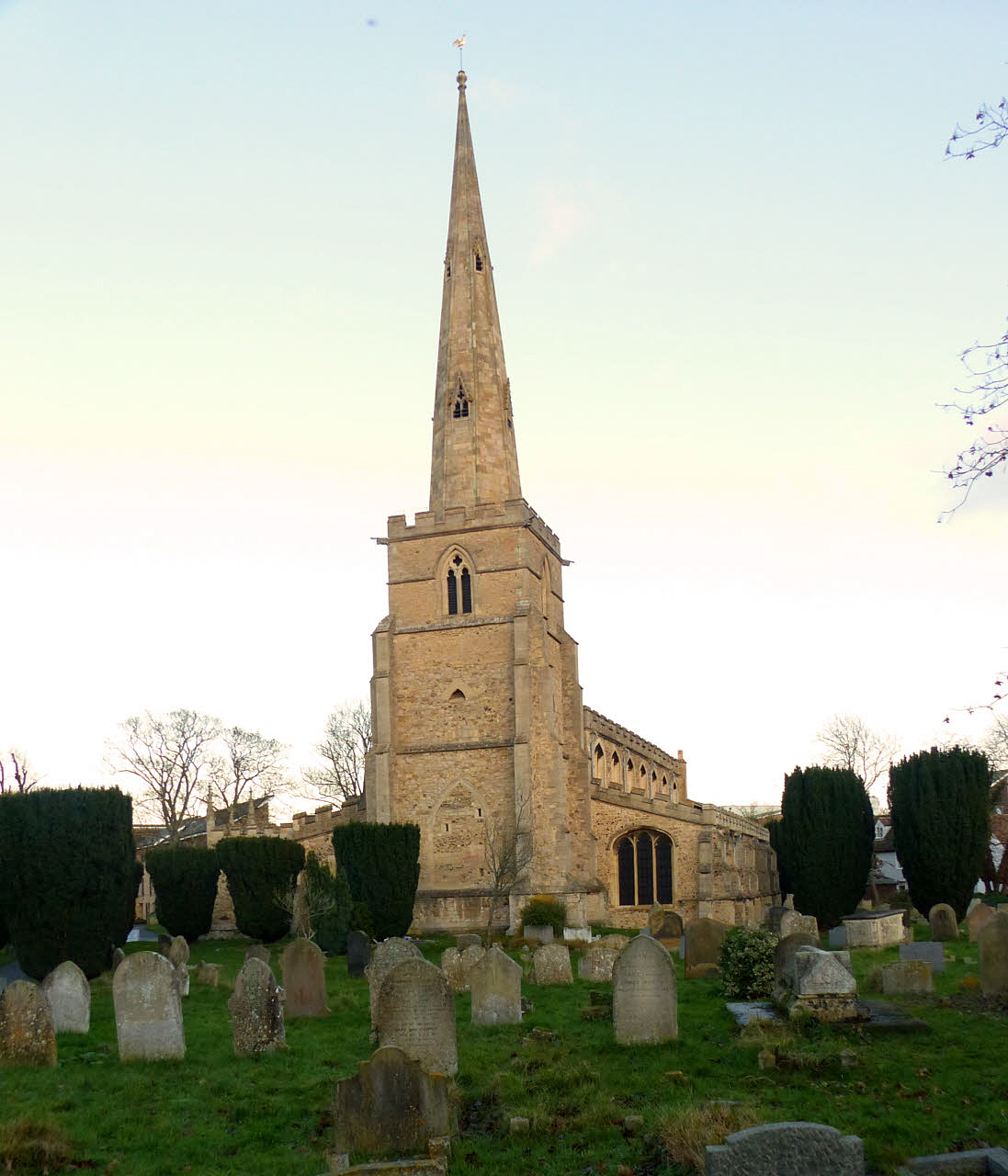
- St Andrew's Church, Chesterton
- St Andrew's Church Chesterton
- 52°12′55.5″N 0°08′23″E
- Location: Church Street, Chesterton, Cambridge
- Country: England
- Denomination: Church of England
- Website: https://www.standrews-chesterton.org

History
- Status: Active

Architecture
- Functional status: Parish church
- Heritage designation: Grade I listed

Administration
- Diocese: Diocese of Ely
- Archdeaconry: Archdeaconry of Cambridge
- Deanery: Cambridge North
- Parish: Chesterton, Cambridge

Clergy
- Vicar: The Revd Dr Philip Lockley

St Andrew's Church, Chesterton is a Church of England parish church in Chesterton, Cambridge. It is a Grade I listed building. A church was first recorded on this site around 1200. The church was presented in 1217 to the papal legate, Cardinal Guala, by Henry III of England, in gratitude for the legate's attempt at reconciliation during domestic unrest at the end of the reign of King John. In 1436 Henry VI seized ownership of the church and associated buildings from the Italian Abbey of Vercelli and gave it to King's Hall, Cambridge which later became Trinity College, Cambridge. Trinity College is the church's patron to this day; with many vicars of Chesterton being fellows of Trinity. The chancel was reconstructed in 1842-44, the spire was restored in 1847-9, and the building was further restored in 1864-67, 1879-80, 1894 and 1968. In the 1880 restoration, remnants of an earlier cruciform church were uncovered, medieval wall paintings were exposed and the porch was rebuilt.

The church is built from flint, rubble and clunch with ashlar on the tower and buttresses. The tower has Decorated bell-openings and is topped by a spire with lucarnes. The windows are in the Perpendicular style, except the easternmost window in the south aisle which is Decorated. They contain Victorian stained glass, which is described by Simon Bradley and Nikolaus Pevsner as variously 'dingy' (east window), 'excellent' (south aisle west window) and 'shockers' (two in the aisles).

The aisled nave has arcades of seven bays, with octagonal piers dating from the 14th century, while the clerestory is 15th century. The much-renewed roof is supported by stone corbels, and the floor is laid with polychromatic tiles. There is a well-preserved 15th-century Doom painting above the chancel arch. The arch itself is Early English. Many carved wooden 15th century benches also survive.

Outside, the graveyard is of interest and is listed. On the church's north wall is a plaque to Anna Maria Vassa (died 1797, aged 4), eldest daughter of the former slave and anti-slavery campaigner Olaudah Equiano. The inscription runs as follows:

"Should simple village rhymes attract thine eye,
Stranger, as thoughtfully thou passest by,
Know that there lies beside this humble stone
A child of colour haply not thine own.
Her father born of Afric's [sic] sun-burnt race,
Torn from his native fields, ah foul disgrace;
Through various toils, at length to Britain came,
Espous'd, so Heaven ordain'd, an English dame,
And followed Christ: their hope two infants dear,
But one, a hapless Orphan, slumbers here,
To bury her the village children came,
And dropp'd choice flowers and lisped her early fame:
And some that lov'd her most, as if unblest
Bedew'd with tears the white wreath on their breast;
But she is gone and dwells in that abode,
Where some of every clime shall joy in God."

Nearby are the Old Manor House to the south, the vicarage (1820) to the east and Chesterton Tower is a little further away just off Chapel Lane.

== Gallery ==
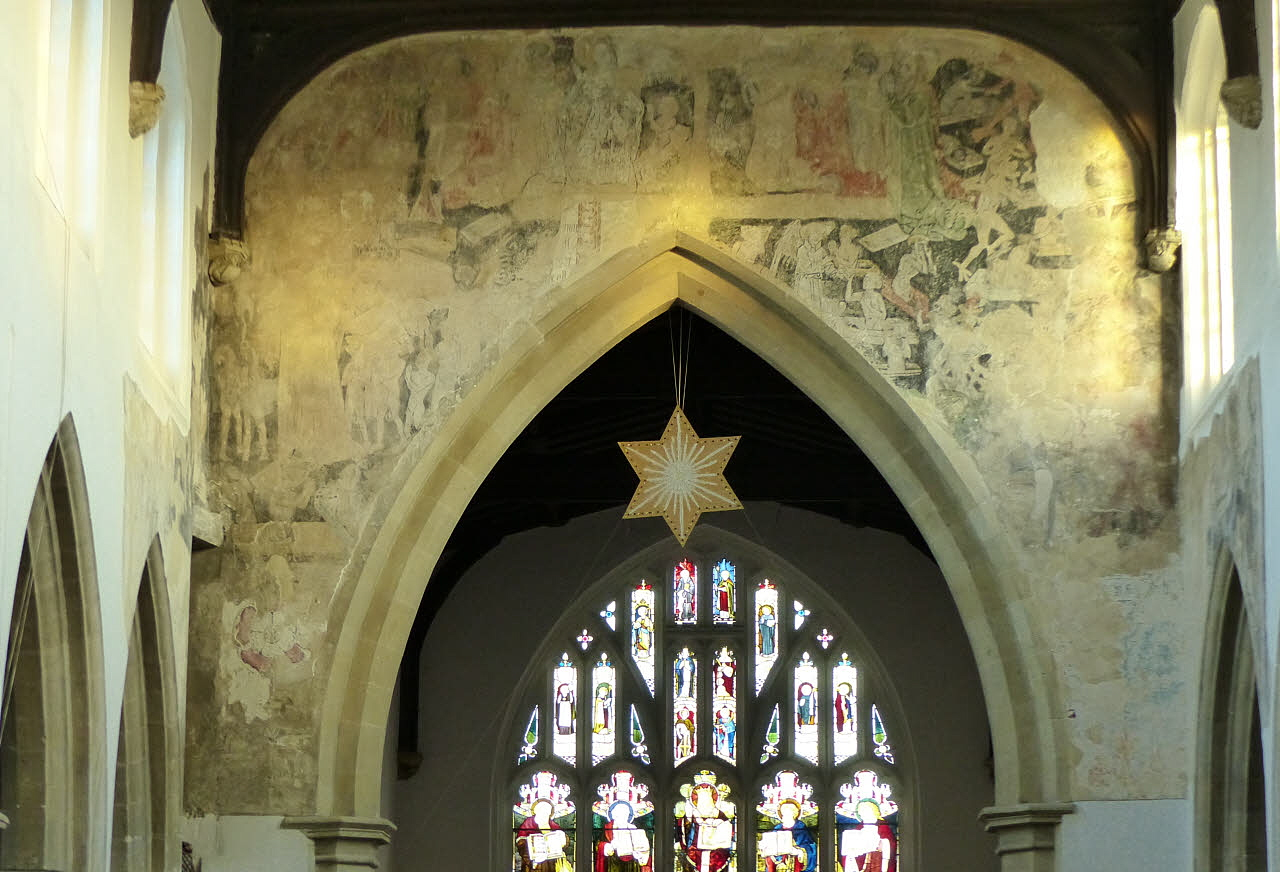
The Doom painting

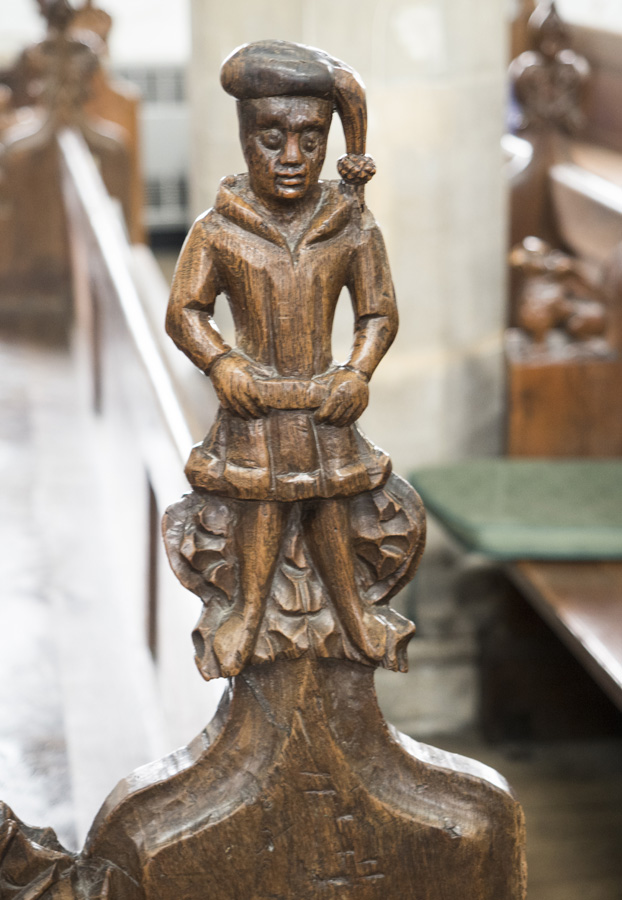
Poppyhead on a bench-end

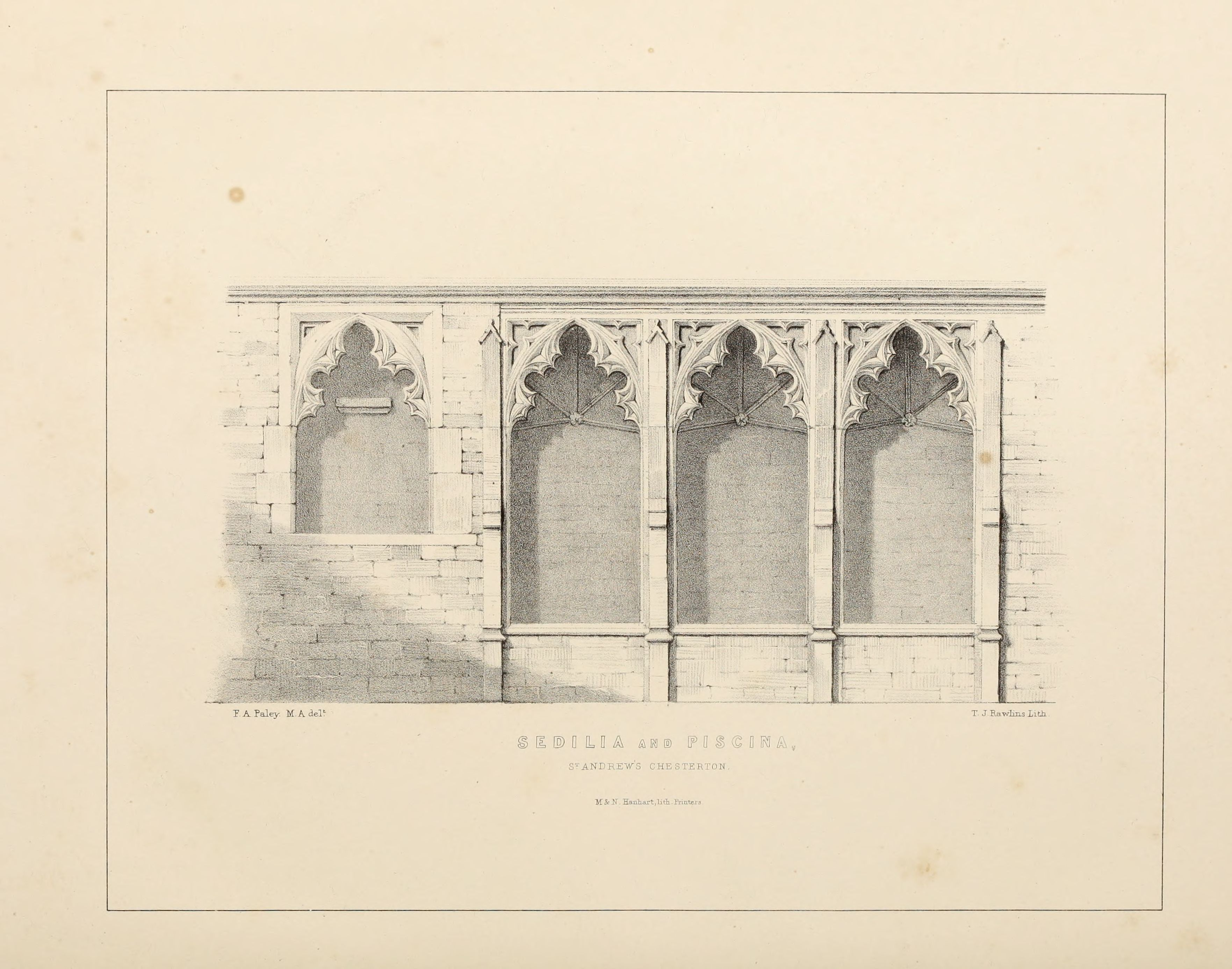
Piscina and sedilia in the chancel

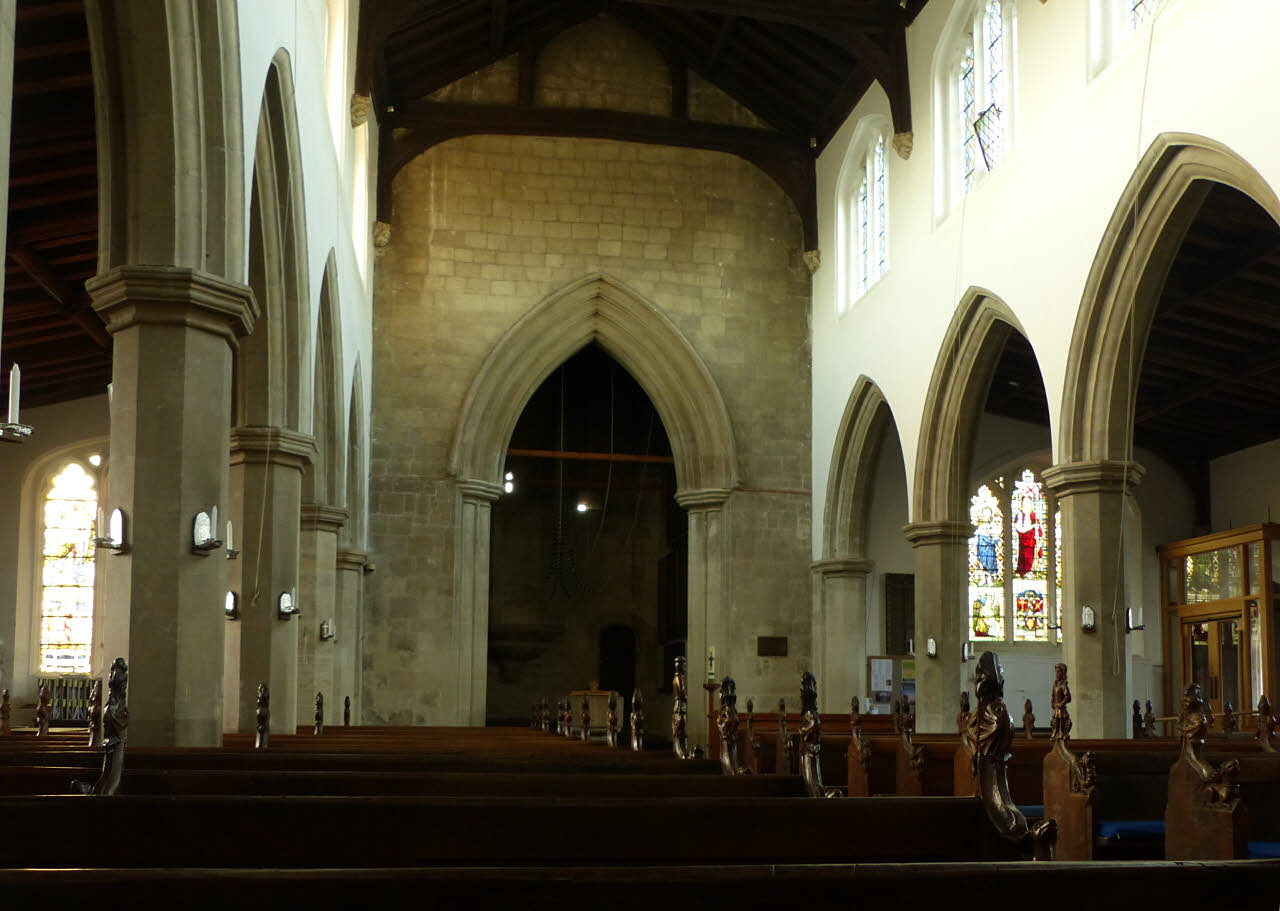
Nave looking west
