= Cataphatic theology =

Way of describing the divine by using affirmative-form statements

Cataphatic theology or kataphatic theology is theology that uses "positive" terminology to describe or refer to the divine – specifically, God – i.e. terminology that describes or refers to what the divine is, in contrast to the "negative" terminology used in apophatic theology to indicate what the divine is not.

== Etymology ==
"Cataphatic" comes from the Greek word κατάφασις kataphasis meaning "affirmation", coming from κατά kata (an intensifier) and φάναι phanai ("to speak").

== Terminology ==
Cataphatic and apophatic theology are two sides of the same coin. One must endeavor to use language to the fullest extent to try and describe God (cataphatic) and then realize that language falls short of doing so (apophatic). To speak of God or the divine cataphatically is thought by some to be by its nature a form of limiting to God or divine. This was one of the core tenets of the works of Pseudo-Dionysius the Areopagite, who said of God, "Neither is there sense, nor image, nor opinion, nor reason, nor knowledge of Him." By defining what God or the divine is, the unlimited is limited. A cataphatic way to express God would be that God is love. The apophatic way would be to state that God is not hate (although such description can be accused of the same dualism). Or to say that God is not love, as he transcends even our notion of love. Ultimately, one would come to remove even the notion of the Trinity, or of saying that God is one, because divine is above numberhood. That God is beyond all duality because God contains within himself all things and that God is beyond all things. Saint Dionysius taught the apophatic way, which involves stripping away any conceptual understanding of God that might become all-encompassing. This approach prevents the limited nature of human understanding from imposing itself on the absolute and divine.

== Eastern Orthodoxy ==
In the Eastern Orthodox Church, kataphatic theology can lead to some knowledge of God, but in an imperfect way. The perfect and only way which is fitting in regard of God is the apophatic way, as the kataphatic way has as its object that which exists, but God is beyond all existing.

== Roman Catholicism ==
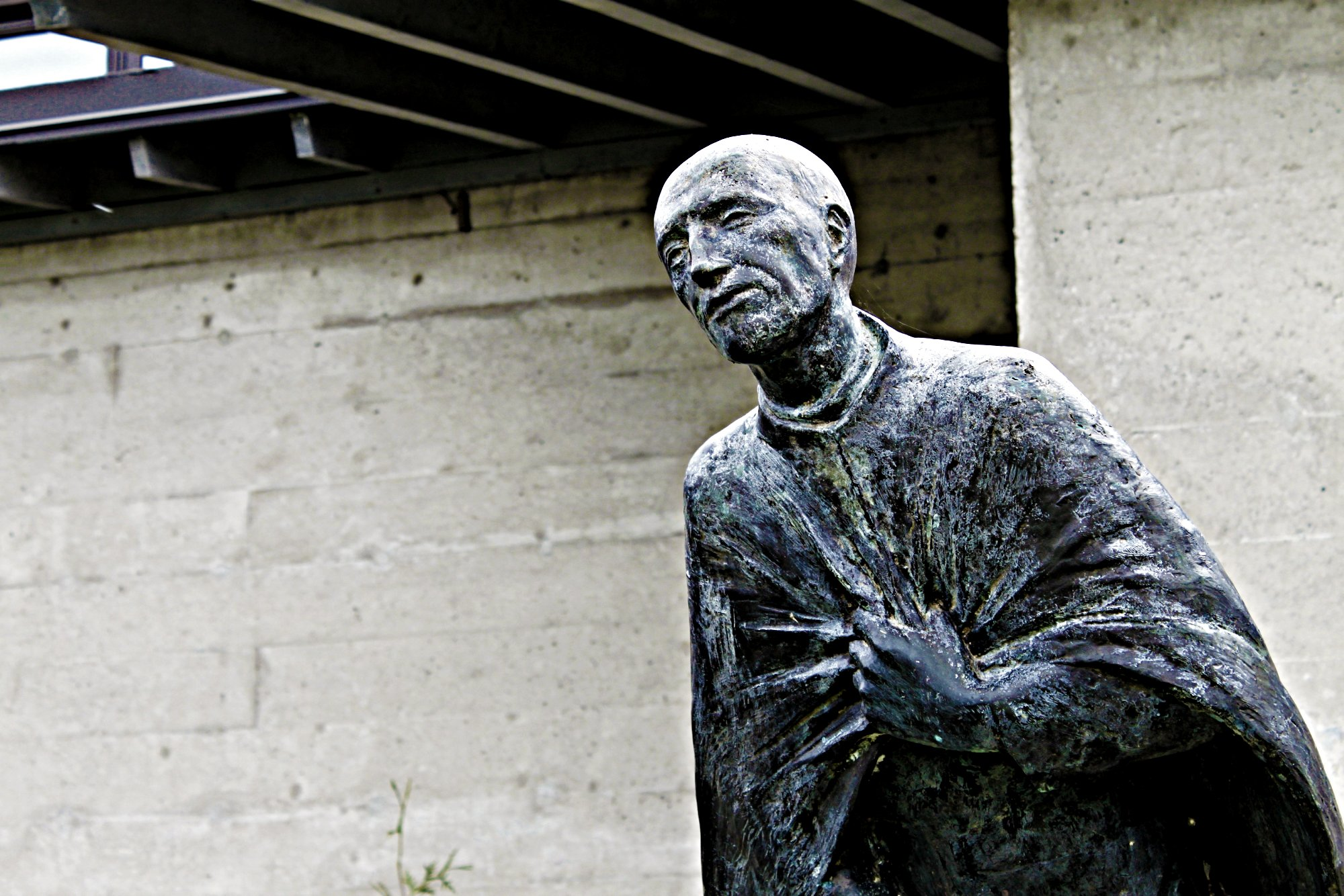
Statue of Saint Ignatius of Loyola

Prominent theologians like Saint Augustine and Saint Ignatius of Loyola used cataphatic and apophatic theology. Saint Augustine wrote "if you can grasp [God], it isn’t God." Saint Ignatius of Loyola created a series of meditations to assist people in the discovery of God's presence and will in their lives. In the book containing these meditations, the meditator is asked to consider God in nature, His infinite care and attention to both His creations and His own self.

== Modern Christian theologians ==
There are several modern theologians who use cataphatic and apophatic theology in their frameworks, such as Karl Rahner, Hans Urs von Balthasar, and Dumitru Stăniloae.

Rahner's use of cataphatic theology is found in the notion that theology at a base level is positive, and is the aggregate of God's word, teaching, and conversation.

Balthasar uses cataphatic theology, or at least positive theology, in his framework of the Trinity where he posits a positive distance that allows the Trinity to contain all, good and evil.

For Stǎniloae, theology must include affirmation, though theology cannot be entirely positive. If theology was entirely apophatic, it would enter into the realm of "intellectual nihilism".

== Cataphatic treatment of ultimate reality in Buddhism ==
Within Mahayana Buddhism, there is a species of scripture which essays a descriptive hint of Ultimate Reality by using positive terminology when speaking of it. This manifestation of Buddhism is particularly marked in the Dzogchen and Tathagatagarbha forms of the religion. Nirvana, for example, is equated with the True Self of the Buddha (pure, uncreated and deathless) in some of the Tathagatagarbha scriptures, and in other Buddhist tantras (such as the Kunjed Gyalpo or 'All-Creating King' tantra), the Primordial Buddha, Samantabhadra, is described as 'pure and total consciousness' – the 'trunk', 'foundation' and 'root' of all that exists.

== In Gaudiya-vaishnavism ==
Gaudiya Vaishnavism speaks positively about transcendental qualities of Krishna. He has 64 transcendental qualities as Supreme Personality of Godhead, although these qualities are explained as non-material and beyond duality. The paradoxical nature of Krishna, the Absolute, being both beyond description and having qualities is discussed throughout the Gaudiya Vaishnavism literature. Among the 64 qualities of Krishna, 4 qualities are unique, which only Krishna has, these are:

- He is the performer of wonderful varieties of pastimes (especially His childhood pastimes).
- He is surrounded by devotees endowed with wonderful love of Godhead.
- He can attract all living entities all over the universes by playing on His flute.
- He has a wonderful excellence of beauty which cannot be rivaled anywhere in the creation.

There are other 60 qualities of Krishna, but Narayana also have them. Of these, 5 are special, which are not found in jiva-atmas or (according to the Vaishnava view) other Hindu deities, even Brahma or Shiva:

- He has inconceivable potency.
- Uncountable universes generate from His body.
- He is the original source of all incarnations.
- He is the giver of salvation to the enemies whom He kills.
- He is the attractor of liberated souls.

Other 55 transcendental qualities are found in Brahma and Shiva, though they are common for Narayana and Krishna, but not found in jiva-atmas. And finally just 50 transcendental qualities can be found in jiva-atmas, who are not on the level of deities, but Krishna and Narayana also have these qualities. It also has to be carefully noted, that these qualities manifest in jiva-atmas only in minute qualities, and only if they become pure devotees of Krishna-Caitanya. On other hand, Krishna has these 64 qualities in full. See full list here: 64 Qualities of Lord Krishna.

== See also ==
- Vladimir Lossky
- Pseudo-Dionysius the Areopagite
- Theosis (Eastern Christian theology)
- The Life of Moses - Gregory of Nyssa
- Anselm of Canterbury

== Literature ==
- Vladimir Lossky The Mystical Theology of the Eastern Church (1957 [1944]), reprints: SVS Press, 1997 (ISBN 0-913836-31-1), James Clarke & Co Ltd, 1991 (ISBN 0-227-67919-9).
- Clarence Edwin Rolt, Dionysius the Areopagite on the Divine Names and the Mystical Theology (1920).
