= Sergius of Reshaina =

- Died: 536
- Occupations: Physician; priest

Sergius of Reshaina (Classical Syriac: ܣܪܓܝܣ ܕܪܝܫ ܥܝܢܐܼ, romanized: Sargis d-Reš ʿAyna, died 536) was a physician and priest during the 6th century. He is best known for translating medical works from Greek to Syriac, which were eventually, during the Abbasid Caliphate of the late 8th- & 9th century, translated into Arabic. Reshaina, where he lived, is located about midway between the then intellectual centres of Edessa and Nisibis, in northern Mesopotamia.

The ninth-century translator Hunain ibn Ishaq gives the names of twenty-six medical texts by Galen which Sergius translated into Syriac; they were the first significant translations of medical works from Greek into a Semitic language, and presumably were the textbooks Sergius himself had used when he studied at Alexandria. Hunain is not always complimentary about Sergius's translations, though some he thinks are better, as Sergius became more experienced. Sergius also translated various other works, including the Categories of Aristotle, Porphyry's Introduction to the Categories and theological works by Pseudo-Dionysius the Areopagite. He also composed two works of his own, On the Influence of the Moon and The Movement on the Sun, probably drawing heavily on Greek sources.

Recently, a palimpsest with an undertext of Galen, translated by Sergius from Greek to Syriac, gathered the attention of scientists. It contains chapters of Galen's On Simple Drugs that had been lost. The manuscripts upper text dates from the 11th century and the undertext, which contains the translation from Sergius of Reshaina, has been dated to the 9th century. The imaging and reading of the text is considered crucial, as it will elucidate the role that Sergius played in the transmission of medical knowledge from Greek into Arabic. Sergius' translations of Galen were copied and recopied for centuries, and eventually became a bridge for moving the medical expertise of the ancient Greeks to Islamic societies. Syriac texts were much easier than Greek ones to translate into Arabic.

Although Sergius kept in close contact with the mostly Nestorian scholars nearby, he was himself a Miaphysite Christian priest. In 535, he was sent to Rome by Ephrem, Orthodox Patriarch of Antioch, and escorted Pope Agapetus I to Constantinople. There he died, the following year.

== Bibliography ==
- Marshall Clagett, Greek Science in Antiquity, pp. 180–181. New York: Abelard-Schuman, 1955; Dover, 2001. ISBN 0-486-41973-8
- Catholic Encyclopedia, Syriac Language and Literature (1912)
