= Leo Reid =

English cricketer (1888–1938)

Personal information
- Full name: Leonard John Reid
- Born: 14 January 1888; Chesterton, Cambridgeshire, England
- Died: 25 October 1938 (aged 50); New York City, New York, United States
- Batting: Left-handed

Domestic team information
- Years: Team
- 1906–1914: Cambridgeshire
- 1913: Marylebone Cricket Club
- 1920–1931: Hertfordshire

Career statistics
Competition	First-class
Matches	1
Runs scored	10
Batting average	5.00
100s/50s	–/–
Top score	6
Catches/stumpings	1/–
- Source: Cricinfo, 7 July 2019

Leonard John Reid (14 January 1888 – 25 October 1938) was an English first-class cricketer.

Reid was born at Chesterton in January 1888. He was educated at Aldenham School, before going up to Christ's College, Cambridge. He made his debut in minor counties cricket for Cambridgeshire in the 1906 Minor Counties Championship. He played minor counties for Cambridgeshire until 1914, making fifty appearances in the Minor Counties Championship. Having not played first-class cricket while at Cambridge, Reid later made a single first-class appearance for the Marylebone Cricket Club (MCC) against Cambridge University at Lord's in 1913. Batting twice in the match, he was dismissed for 6 runs in the MCC first-innings by Geoffrey Davies, while in their second-innings he was dismissed for 4 runs by the same bowler. Following the First World War, he switched to playing minor counties cricket for Hertfordshire, making 65 appearances in the Minor Counties Championship between 1920–31, as well as captaining the side from 1923–27. Reid later emigrated to the United States, where he died at New York City in October 1938.
