= Pseudo-Dionysius the Areopagite =

Christian apophatic theologian

- Born: unknown (5th–6th century AD)
- Died: unknown (5th–6th century AD)
- Other names: "Dionysius"; "Denys"; "(Saint) Dionysius the Areopagite" (mistaken identification)

Philosophical work
- Era: Ancient philosophy Medieval philosophy
- Region: Western philosophy
- School: Neoplatonism; Christian philosophy
- Main interests: Apophatic theology Christian angelology Christian mysticism
- Notable works: De Coelesti Hierarchia
- Notable ideas: Seven Archangels; Hierarchy of angels

Pseudo-Dionysius the Areopagite, Dionysius the Pseudo-Areopagite or Pseudo-Denys is the pseudonymous name used by a Syrian or Greek monk, Christian theologian and Neoplatonic philosopher of the late 5th to early 6th century, who wrote a set of works known as the Corpus Areopagiticum or Corpus Dionysiacum. Through his writing in Mystical Theology, he has been identified as the "progenitor of apophatic or negative theology."

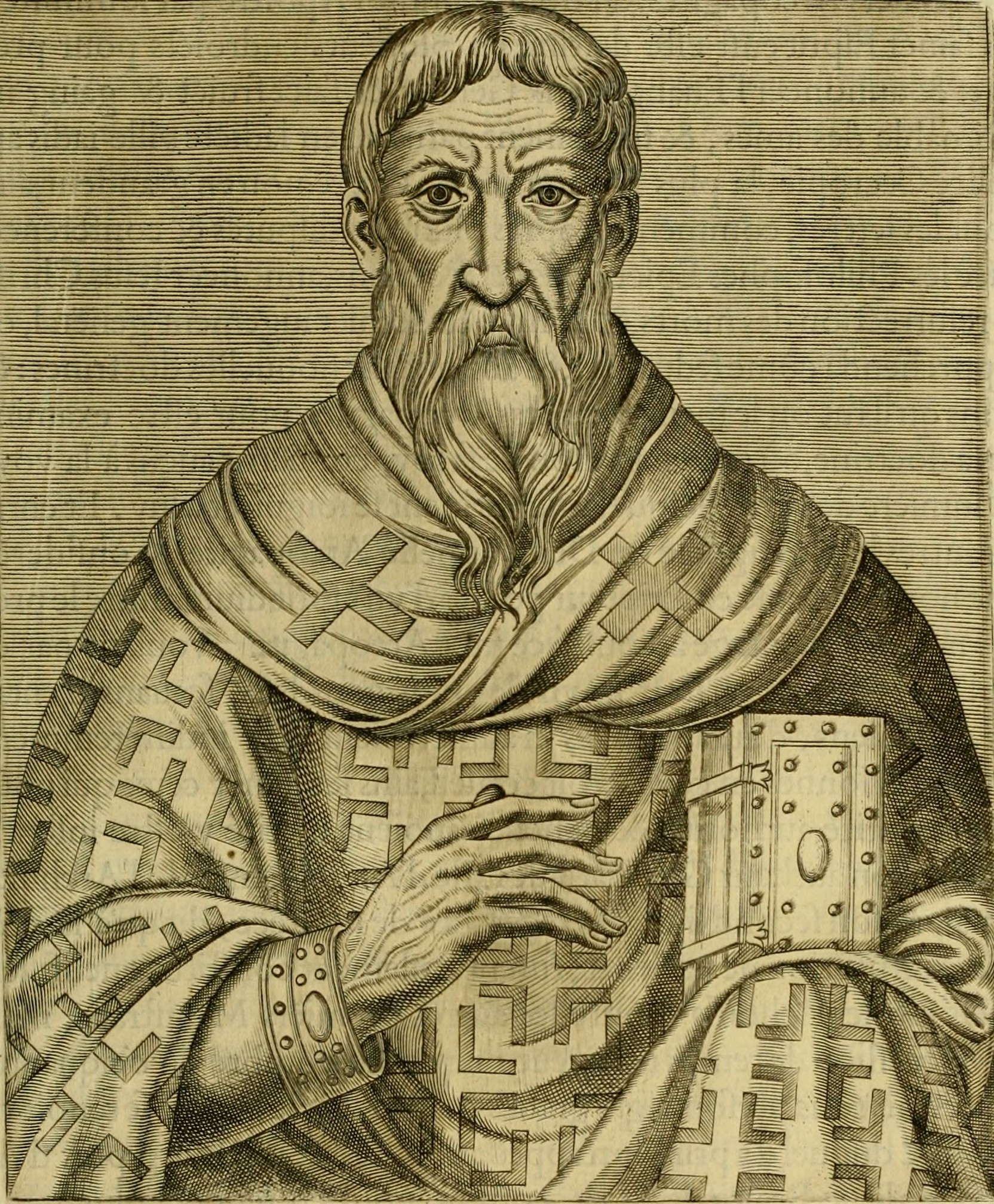
Engraving of Dionysius the Areopagite, created in 1584 by André Thevet.

The author identifies himself in the corpus as "Dionysios", seemingly portraying himself as the 1st century Dionysius the Areopagite, an Athenian convert of Paul the Apostle mentioned in Acts 17:34. (Note: Acts 17:34: "A few men became followers of Paul and believed. Among them was Dionysius, a member of the Areopagus, also a woman named Damaris, and a number of others.") Modern historical-critical scholarship and philological research since 1895 has maintained a consensus that the texts adapt the late Neoplatonic philosophy of Proclus, attributing these works to an anonymous individual influenced by Neoplatonism and writing with Byzantine Greek in post-Chalcedonian Syria, being dated to around 485–528 AD.

== Historical confusion ==
In the early sixth century, a series of writings of a mystical nature, employing Neoplatonic language to elucidate Christian theological and mystical ideas, was ascribed to the Areopagite. They have long been recognized as pseudepigrapha, and their author is now called "Pseudo-Dionysius the Areopagite".

== Corpus ==
=== Works ===
The surviving corpus comprises:

- Divine Names (Περὶ θείων ὀνομάτων);
- Celestial Hierarchy (Περὶ τῆς οὐρανίου ἱεραρχίας);
- Ecclesiastical Hierarchy (Περὶ τῆς ἐκκλησιαστικῆς ἱεραρχίας);
- Mystical Theology (Περὶ μυστικῆς θεολογίας), "a brief but powerful work that deals with negative or apophatic theology and in which theology becomes explicitly 'mystical' for the first time in history";
- Ten epistles.

Seven other works are mentioned repeatedly by pseudo-Dionysius in his surviving works, and are presumed either to be lost or to be fictional works mentioned by the Areopagite as a literary device to give the impression to his sixth-century readers of engaging with the surviving fragments of a much larger first-century corpus of writings. These seven other works are:

- Theological Outlines (Θεολογικαὶ ὑποτυπώσεις),
- Symbolic Theology (Συμβολικὴ θεολογία),
- On Angelic Properties and Orders (Περὶ ἀγγελικῶν ἰδιοτήτων καὶ τάξεων),
- On the Just and Divine Judgement (Περὶ δικαίου καὶ θείου δικαστηρίου),
- On the Soul (Περὶ ψυχῆς),
- On Intelligible and Sensible Beings, (Note: Also known as The Intelligible and the Sensible; this is only referred to in the Ecclesiastical Hierarchy.)
- On the Divine Hymns. (Note: This is only referred to in the Celestial Hierarchy.)

=== Dating ===
In the Ecclesiastical Hierarchy Dionysius twice seems to allude to the recitation of the Creed in the course of the liturgy (EH 3.2 and 3.III.7). It is often asserted that Peter the Fuller first mandated the inclusion of the Nicene Creed in the liturgy in 476, thus providing an earliest date for the composition of the Corpus. Bernard Capelle argues that it is far more likely that Timothy, patriarch of Constantinople, was responsible for this liturgical innovation, around 515—thus suggesting a later date for the Corpus.

It is often suggested that because Dionysius seems to eschew divisive Christological language, he was probably writing after the Henoticon of Zeno was in effect, sometime after 482. It is also possible that Dionysius eschewed traditional Christological formulae in order to preserve an overall apostolic ambience for his works, rather than because of the influence of the Henoticon. Also, given that the Henoticon was rescinded in 518, if Dionysius was writing after this date, he may have been untroubled by this policy. In terms of the latest date for the composition of the Corpus, the earliest datable reference to Dionysius' writing comes in 528, the year in which the treatise of Severus of Antioch entitled Adversus apologiam Juliani was translated into Syriac—though it is possible the treatise may originally have been composed up to nine years earlier.

Another widely cited latest date for Dionysius' writing comes in 532, when, in a report on a colloquy held between two groups (dyophysite and miaphysite) debating the decrees of the Council of Chalcedon, Severus of Antioch and his miaphysite supporters cited Dionysius' Fourth Letter in defence of their view. It is possible that pseudo-Dionysius was himself a member of this group, though debate continues over whether his writings do in fact reveal a miaphysite understanding of Christ. It seems likely that the writer was located in Syria, as revealed, for example, by the accounts of the sacramental rites he gives in The Ecclesiastical Hierarchy, which seem only to bear resemblance to Syriac rites.

=== Authorship ===
The author pseudonymously identifies himself in the corpus as "Dionysios", portraying himself as the figure of Dionysius the Areopagite, the Athenian convert of Paul the Apostle mentioned in Acts 17:34.

Various legends existed surrounding the figure of Dionysius, who became emblematic of the spread of the gospel to the Greek world. A tradition quickly arose that he became the first bishop of Cyprus or of Milan, or that he was the author of the Epistle to the Hebrews; according to Eusebius, he was also said to be the first bishop of Athens. It is therefore not surprising that that author of these works would have chosen to adopt the name of this otherwise briefly mentioned figure.

==== Initial disputes ====
The authorship of the Dionysian Corpus was initially disputed; Severus and his party affirmed its apostolic dating, largely because it seemed to agree with their Christology. This dating was disputed by Hypatius of Ephesus, who met the monophysite party during the 532 meeting with Emperor Justinian I; Hypatius denied its authenticity on the ground that none of the Fathers or Councils ever cited or referred to it. Hypatius condemned it along with the Apollinarian texts, distributed during the Nestorian controversy under the names of Pope Julius and Athanasius, which the monophysites entered as evidence supporting their position.

The first defense of its authenticity is undertaken by John of Scythopolis, whose commentary on the Dionysian Corpus, the Scholia (c. 540), constitutes the first defense of its apostolic dating. In it, John specifically argues that the work is neither Apollinarian nor a forgery, probably in response both to monophysites and Hypatius—although even he, given his unattributed citations of Plotinus in interpreting Dionysius, might have known better. Dionysius' authenticity is criticized later in the century, and defended by Theodore of Raithu; and by the 7th century, it is taken as demonstrated, affirmed by both Maximus the Confessor and the Lateran Council of 649. From that point until the Renaissance, the authorship was less questioned, though Thomas Aquinas, Peter Abelard and Nicholas of Cusa expressed suspicions about its authenticity; their concerns were generally ignored.

==== Historical-critical and philological overview ====
The Florentine humanist Lorenzo Valla (d. 1457), in his 1457 commentaries on the New Testament, did much to establish that the author of the Corpus Areopagiticum could not have been St. Paul's convert, though he was unable to identify the actual historical author. William Grocyn pursued Valla's lines of textual criticism, and Valla's critical viewpoint of the authorship of the highly influential Corpus was accepted and publicized by Erasmus from 1504 onward, for which he was criticized by Catholic theologians. In the Leipzig disputation with Martin Luther, in 1519, Johann Eck used the Corpus, specifically the Angelic Hierarchy, as argument for the apostolic origin of papal supremacy, pressing the Platonist analogy, "as above, so below".

During the 19th century Catholic historians too came generally to accept that the author must have lived after the time of Proclus. The author became known as 'Pseudo-Dionysius the Areopagite' only after the philological work of J. Stiglmayr and H. Koch, whose papers, published independently in 1895, demonstrated the thoroughgoing dependence of the Corpus upon Proclus. Both showed that Dionysius had used, in his treatise on evil in Chapter 4 of The Divine Names, the De malorum subsistentia of Proclus.

Dionysius' identity is still disputed. Corrigan and Harrington find pseudo-Dionysius to be most probably...

... a pupil of Proclus, perhaps of Syrian origin, who knew enough of Platonism and the Christian tradition to transform them both. Since Proclus died in 485, and since the first clear citation of Dionysius' works is by Severus of Antioch between 518 and 528, then we can place Dionysius' authorship between 485 and 518-28. (Note: "It must also be recognized that "forgery" is a modern notion. Like Plotinus and the Cappadocians before him, Dionysius does not claim to be an innovator, but rather a communicator of a tradition. Adopting the persona of an ancient figure was a long established rhetorical device (known as declamatio), and others in Dionysius' circle also adopted pseudonymous names from the New Testament. Dionysius' works, therefore, are much less a forgery in the modern sense than an acknowledgement of reception and transmission, namely, a kind of coded recognition that the resonances of any sacred undertaking are intertextual, bringing the diachronic structures of time and space together in a synchronic way, and that this theological teaching, at least, is dialectically received from another. Dionysius represents his own teaching as coming from a certain Hierotheus and as being addressed to a certain Timotheus. He seems to conceive of himself, therefore, as an in-between figure, very like a Dionysius the Areopagite, in fact.)

Ronald Hathaway provides a table listing most of the major identifications of Dionysius: e.g., Ammonius Saccas, Pope Dionysius of Alexandria, Peter the Fuller, Dionysius the Scholastic, Severus of Antioch, Sergius of Reshaina, unnamed Christian followers of everyone from Origen to Basil of Caesarea, Eutyches to Proclus.

In the past half-century, Alexander Golitzin, Georgian academician Shalva Nutsubidze and Belgian professor Ernest Honigmann have all proposed identifying pseudo-Dionysius the Areopagite with Peter the Iberian. A more recent identification is with Damascius, the last scholarch of the Neoplatonic Academy of Athens. There is therefore no current scholarly consensus on the question of pseudo-Dionysius' identification.

The Stanford Encyclopedia of Philosophy claims:

It must also be recognized that "forgery" is a modern notion. Like Plotinus and the Cappadocian Fathers before him, Dionysius does not claim to be an innovator, but rather a communicator of a tradition.

Other scholars such as Bart D. Ehrman disagree, see for example Forged. While pseudo-Dionysius can be seen as a communicator of tradition, he can also be seen as a polemicist, who tried to alter Neo-Platonic tradition in a novel way for the Christian world that would make notions of complicated Divine Hierarchies more of an emphasis than notions of direct relationship with the figure of Christ as Mediator.

==== Religious defenses of traditional attribution ====
Romanian Orthodox theologian and professor Dumitru Stăniloae, and English translator Reverend John Parker, had argued in favour of a traditional composition date in the late 1st to early 2nd century. Similarly, Evangelos Nikitopoulos and Patrick Craig Truglia argue for the corpus having a composition date prior to the 3rd century, basing their case primarily on the text's internal self-identification as Paul's disciple and asserting that pagan Neoplatonists borrowed from early Christian thought. Nikitopoulos also posits that there is theological vocabulary which aligns the language use with that of Justin Martyr. These views are rejected by mainstream scholarship and historians, who date the works to 5th or 6th century Syria due to their direct textual reliance on Proclus and an absence from the historical record prior to 532 AD.

== Thought ==
Within his writings, Dionysius frames his theology as a continuation of his mentor named "Hierotheus", a figure intended to evoke Hierotheos of Athens to reinforce the author's 1st-century persona. While later some 19th to 20th century scholars attempted to link this figure to The book of Hierotheus on the hidden mysteries of the house of God which is attributed to a 5th century Syrian monk Stephen Bar Sudhaile, this is contentious, as modern consensus holds that The Book of Hierotheos was composed after the Dionysian corpus and was itself influenced by Dionysius.

The works of Dionysius are mystical, and show strong Neoplatonic influence. For example, he uses Plotinus' well-known analogy of a sculptor cutting away that which does not enhance the desired image, and shows familiarity with Proclus. He also shows influence from Clement of Alexandria, the Cappadocian Fathers, Origen, and others.

=== Mystical Theology ===
According to pseudo-Dionysius, God is better characterized and approached by negations than by affirmations. All names and theological representations must be negated. According to pseudo-Dionysius, when all names are negated, "divine silence, darkness, and unknowing" will follow.

== Influence ==
=== Eastern Christianity ===
His work was initially used by Miaphysites to support parts of their arguments but his writings were eventually adopted by other church theologians, primarily due to the work of John of Scythopolis and Maximus the Confessor in producing an orthodox interpretation. Writing a single generation at most after Dionysius, perhaps between 537 and 543, John of Scythopolis composed an extensive set (c. 600) of scholia (that is, marginal annotations) to the works of Dionysius.

These were in turn prefaced by a long prologue in which John set out his reasons for commenting on the corpus. All Greek manuscripts of the Corpus Areopagiticum surviving today stem from an early sixth-century manuscript containing John's Scholia and Prologue — so John of Scythopolis had an enormous influence on how Dionysius was read in the Greek-speaking world.

Theologians such as John of Damascus and Germanus I of Constantinople also made ample use of Dionysius' writing.

The Dionysian writings and their mystical teaching were universally accepted throughout the East, amongst both Chalcedonians and non-Chalcedonians. Gregory Palamas, for example, in referring to these writings, calls the author, "an unerring beholder of divine things".

The Corpus is also present in Syriac and Armenian versions, the former of which, by Sergius of Reshaina in the early sixth century, serves as a terminus ante quem for the dating of the original Greek.

=== Latin Christianity ===
The first notice of Dionysius in the West comes from Pope Gregory I, who probably brought a codex of the Corpus Areopagitum back with him on his return from his mission as papal legate to the Emperor in Constantinople in c. 585. Gregory refers occasionally in his writings to Dionysius, although Gregory's Greek was probably not adequate to fully engage with Dionysius's work. In the seventh and eighth centuries, Dionysius was not widely known in the West, aside from a few scattered references.

The real influence of Dionysius in the West began with the gift in 827 of a Greek copy of his works by the Byzantine emperor Michael II to the Carolingian emperor Louis the Pious. King Louis in turn gave the manuscript to the Abbey of St. Denis near Paris where, in about 838, Hilduin, the abbot of Saint Denis, was induced to attempt a translation of Dionysius' works into Latin. However, his efforts, were unsuccessful. Even then it may well have been Hilduin himself who promoted his work (and his abbey) by developing the legend (which would be widely accepted during subsequent centuries), that Denis was the same person as Dionysius the Areopagite of Acts 17.34, and that he had traveled to Rome and then was commissioned by the Pope to preach in Gaul, where he was martyred. Hilduin's translation is almost unintelligible.

About twenty years later, a subsequent Carolingian Emperor, Charles the Bald, requested the Irishman John Scotus Eriugena to make a fresh translation. He finished this in 862. This translation he produced was of an "almost torturous literalness" and did not widely circulate in subsequent centuries. Moreover, although Eriugena's own works, such as the Homily on the Prologue of St John, show the influence of Dionysian ideas, these works were not widely copied or read in subsequent centuries. The Benedictine monasticism that formed the standard monasticism of the eighth to eleventh centuries, therefore, in general paid little attention to Dionysius.

In the twelfth century, greater use gradually began to be made of Dionysius among various traditions of thought:

- Among Benedictines (especially at the Abbey of Saint-Denis), greater interest began to be shown in Dionysius. For example, one of the monks of Saint Denys, John Sarrazin, wrote a commentary on The Celestial Hierarchy in 1140, and then in 1165 made a translation of the work. Also, Suger, abbot of Saint-Denis from 1122 to 1151, drew on Dionysian themes to explain how the architecture of his new 'Gothic' abbey church helped raise the soul to God.
- Among the Canons Regular. Hugh of Saint Victor edited two commentaries on The Celestial Hierarchy between 1125 and 1137, later revising and combining them as one. Richard of Saint Victor was familiar with Dionysius through Hugh. Through Hugh, others became exposed to Dionysian thought, including Thomas Gallus and Gilbert de la Porrée.
- In the Cistercian tradition, it seems that early writers such as Bernard of Clairvaux, William of St Thierry and Aelred of Rievaulx were not influenced by Dionysian thought. Among second-generation Cistercians, Isaac of Stella clearly shows the influence of Dionysian ideas.
- It is in the Schools, though, that the twelfth-century growth in influence of Dionysius was truly significant. There are few references to Dionysius in scholastic theology during the tenth and eleventh centuries. At the beginning of the twelfth century, though, the masters of the Cathedral school at Laon, especially Anselm of Laon, introduced extracts from John Scotus Eriugena's Commentary on St John into the Sentences and the Glossa Ordinaria. In this manner, Dionysian concepts found their way into the writing of Peter Lombard and others.
- Bonaventure uses images and even direct quotations from Dionysius' Mystical Theology in the last chapter of his famous work Itinerarium Mentis in Deum (The Soul's Journey into God).

During the thirteenth century, the Franciscan Robert Grosseteste made an important contribution by bringing out between 1240 and 1243 a translation, with commentary, of the Dionysian corpus. Soon after, the Dominican Albertus Magnus did likewise. The thirteenth-century Parisian corpus provided an important reference point by combining the "Old Translation" of John Scotus Eriugena with the "New Translation" of John Sarrazin, along with glosses and scholia by Maximus the Confessor, John of Scythopolis and others, as well as the "Extracts" by Thomas Gallus, and several commentaries such as John Scotus Eriugena, John Sarrazin and Hugh of Saint Victor on The Celestial Hierarchy. It quickly became common to make reference to Dionysius. Thomas Aquinas wrote an explanation for several works, and cites him over 1700 times. Bonaventure called him the "prince of mystics".

Martin Luther's ambiguous stance toward Dionysius was notable. The reformer at times seemed to reject him entirely, at other times to appreciate him, and the passage from "On the Babylonian Captivity of the Church" (1520) is well known, in which he says:

"I completely disapprove of giving so much credence to this Dionysius, whoever he was, since there is practically no solid learning to be found in him. Take, for instance, the fabrications about the angels in his Celestial Hierarchy (a book much sweated over by people of a curious or superstitious temperament). By what authority or reason, I ask, does he prove any of this? If you read and evaluate this honestly, are not all these things his own dreamlike musings? On the other hand, in his Mystical Theology (so highly praised by some of the most ignorant theologians), he is most dangerous, speaking more like a Platonist than a Christian".

Notwithstanding, in other works, he did not hesitate to cite Dionysius as a reference, such as in his commentary on Psalm 18 contained in the lectures "Dictata super Psalterium" (1513–1515), in which he states:

“Therefore, blessed Dionysius teaches that one must enter into anagogical darkness and ascend by way of denials. For thus God is hidden and beyond understanding."

Thus, Luther did not reject Dionysian thought; on the contrary, being someone who so often cited Bernand of Clairvaux, Bonaventure and Johannes Tauler, he was strongly influenced by dionysianism through the German medieval mystics, as shown by Johannes Zachhuber. This influence is evident in the fact that the reformer published the mystical writing "Theologia Germanica", which is clearly inspired by Dionysian thought, and it is also visible in a key concept of Luther's theology: the Deus absconditus (hidden God), an essential doctrine of negative theology, as this method is distinctly endorsed by the reformer, who, like Dionysius and the other mystics, believed in the insufficiency of human reason (philosophy and positive theology) to reach God. His criticisms, therefore, are not aimed at Dionysius’s doctrine itself, but at its “abuse” (from Luther’s perspective) by his opponents, such as Johann Eck, a Roman Catholic apologist who cited Dionysius’s writings to justify the papacy and the view that ordination is a sacrament, against whom the reformer debated between 1519 and 1520, as well the Anabaptists, his adversaries in later disputes.

It was subsequently in the area of mysticism that Dionysius, especially his portrayal of the via negativa, was particularly influential. In the fourteenth and fifteenth centuries his fundamental themes were hugely influential on thinkers such as Marguerite Porete, Meister Eckhart, Johannes Tauler, John of Ruusbroec, the author of The Cloud of Unknowing (who made an expanded Middle English translation of Dionysius' Mystical Theology), Jean Gerson, Nicholas of Cusa, Denis the Carthusian, Julian of Norwich, Hendrik Herp and Catherine of Genoa ["The Mystical Element of Religion as Studied in Saint Catherine of Genoa and Her Friends (1908)]. His influence can also be traced in the Spanish Carmelite thought of the sixteenth century among Teresa of Ávila and John of the Cross.

== Modern appraisal ==
In recent decades, interest has increased again in the Corpus Areopagiticum, for three main reasons: because of a recovery of the huge impact of Dionysian thought in later Christian thought, because of an increasing repudiation of older criticisms that Dionysius's thought represented a fundamentally Neoplatonic approach to theology, and finally because of interest in parallels between aspects of modern linguistic theory and Dionysius's reflections on language and negative theology.

Andrew Louth offers the following modern appraisal of the Areopagite;

Dionysius/Denys' vision is remarkable because, on the one hand, his understanding of hierarchy makes possible a rich symbolic system in terms of which we can understand God and the cosmos and our place within it, and, on the other, he finds room within this strictly hierarchical society for an escape from it, beyond it, by transcending symbols and realizing directly one's relationship with God as his creature, the creature of his love. There is space within the Dionysian universe for a multitude of ways of responding to God's love. That spaciousness is worth exploring: and therein, perhaps, lies the enduring value of the vision of Dionysius/Denys the Areopagite.

== See also ==
- Apophatic theology
- Cataphatic theology
- Celestial hierarchy
- Henosis
- Neoplatonism and Christianity
- Pseudepigrapha
- St. Dionysus Institute in Paris
- Theoria

== Sources ==
- Corrigan, Kevin; Harrington, L. Michael (2014), Pseudo-Dionysius the Areopagite, Stanford Encyclopedia of Philosophy
- Franke, William (2007), On What Cannot Be Said: Apophatic Discourses in Philosophy, Religion, Literature, and the Arts Volume 1, ISBN 978-0268028824
- Lamarre, Mark, Pseudo-Dionysius the Areopagite (fl. c. 650—c. 725 CE), Internet Encyclopedia of Philosophy
- Elena Ene D-Vasilescu, "Pseudo-Dionysius the Areopagite and Byzantine Art", Journal of Early Christian History, Taylor & Francis, Volume 11, Issue 2, 2021, pp. 50–75; DOI: 10.1080/2222582X.2020.1743955
- Elena Ene D-Vasilescu, "If you wish to contemplate God': Pseudo-Dionysius on the notion of will", Studia Patristica, vol. C (100), 2020: 247-257
