= Guala Bicchieri =

Italian diplomat and cardinal

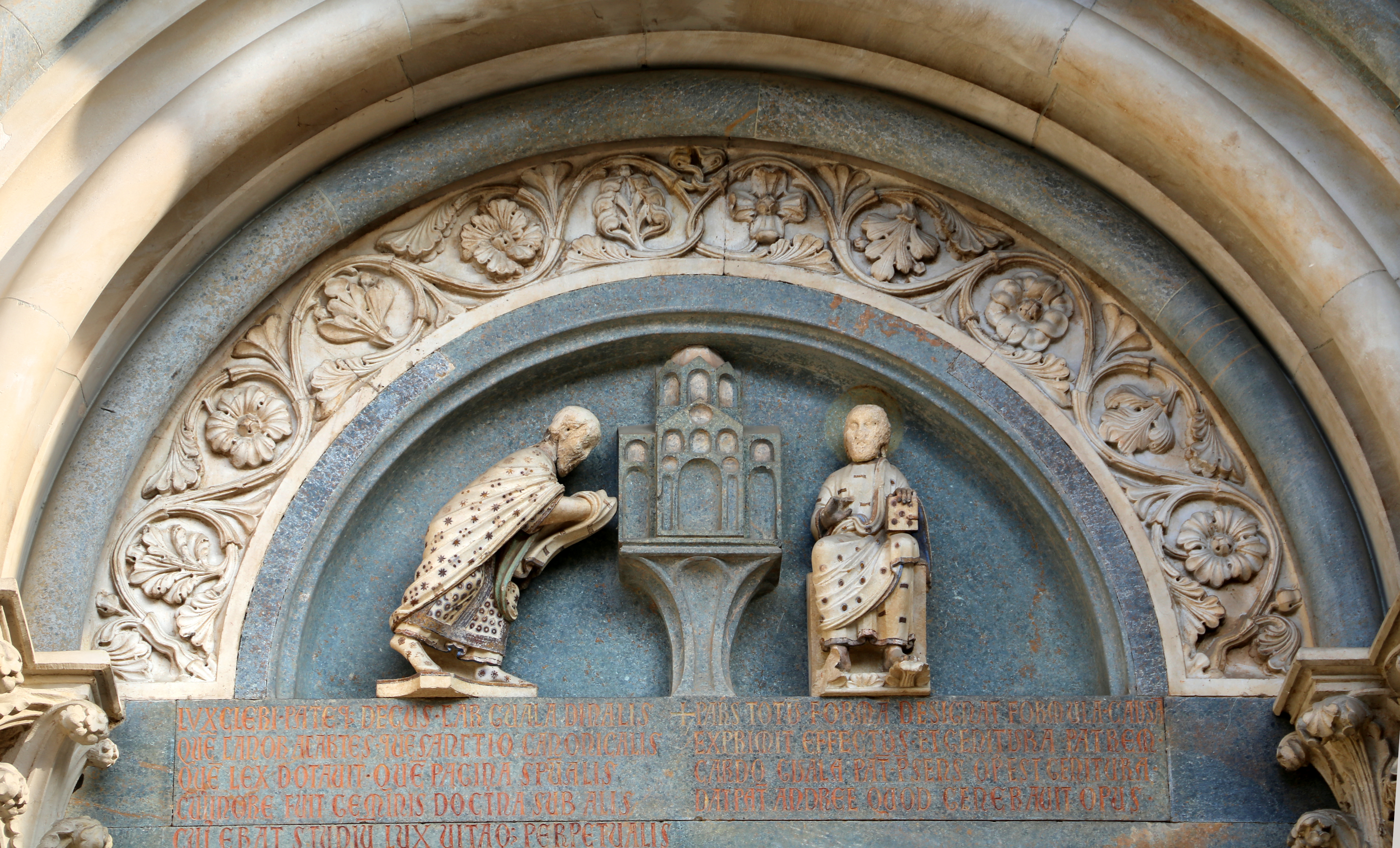
- Church: Roman Catholic Church
- Diocese: Vercelli
- Other post: Papal Nuncio Legate

Orders
- Created cardinal: 1205 by Pope Innocent III

Personal details
- Born: Guala Bicchieri
- Died: Vercelli
- Buried: St Andrews Abbey
- Parents: Manfredo Bicheriis

Guala Bicchieri (c. 1150 – 1227) was an Italian diplomat, papal official and cardinal. He was the papal legate in England from 1216 to 1218 and took a prominent role in the politics of England during King John's last years and Henry III's early minority.

== Career ==
Guala Bicchieri was from a prominent family in Vercelli, in northern Italy, in what is now the Italian region of Piedmont; his father, Manfredo de Bicheriis, was a consul of the city. He was trained for the law but entered the clergy; he was first mentioned in 1187 as a canon in the cathedral of Vercelli. By 1205 he had become a cardinal and had served as a papal legate in northern Italy before being appointed legate to France in 1208.

=== Papal legate to England ===
Pope Innocent III named him legate to England in January 1216, since his plans for a crusade were being threatened by the civil war (now known as the First Barons' War) and the concerted effort by the rebel barons and French invaders under Louis of France to oust John. He arrived in England in the midst of that rebellion, when the suspension and exile of archbishop Stephen Langton had also left the English church without a leader - Langton was absent from the kingdom from September 1215 to May 1218. This gave Bicchieri particular influence and left him practically in charge of the English church.

Since John had surrendered England to the pope in May 1213, the pope was John's suzerain. He supported John and - as the Pope's nuncio - played an important role in stabilizing the English church in the aftermath of this civil war as well as being instrumental in the reissuing of Magna Carta. He punished English clerics who supported the French invader, Louis, and removed many of them from their positions.

After John's death he crowned his successor Henry III (to whom the pope was still suzerain) and acted as his protector. As the pope's nuncio Bicchieri he claimed the regency over Henry during the latter's minority but settled for dividing rule of the kingdom with William Marshal, 1st Earl of Pembroke. Vincent (below) points out six areas in which Bicchieri made an impact upon England: establishing peace between the monarchy and rebels; overseeing elections of bishops; supervising monastic houses; punishing and replacing rebel clergy; judicial activity, including the appointment of legatine judges delegate; and implementing the legislation of the Fourth Lateran Council.

Guala was attacked in a long satirical poem by Gilles de Corbeil. After the Treaty of Lambeth, he forced Louis to make a public and humiliating profession of penitence. He was also instrumental in convincing Pope Honorius III to grant an indulgence to the dean and chapter of Old Salisbury Cathedral permitting them to leave Old Sarum and start building New Salisbury Cathedral.

=== Return to Italy ===
Guala Bicchieri returned to Italy in 1219 after the final defeat of the English rebel barons and the Treaty of Lambeth. Soon after his return to Italy, he founded the Basilica di Sant'Andrea in Vercelli, his home town. It is named after (and imitates the architecure of) St Andrew's Church in Chesterton, Cambridge, which Bicchieri had been given by Henry III in his minority (along with the Church of St. Peter, and its manor, in Tewin, Herefordshire) for his services to the church during the difficult period of the civil war. In 1224, also in Vercelli, he founded Saint Andrew's hospital.

The premises of Vercelli Cathedral Museum hold the famed Vercelli Book, one of the four major extant manuscripts of Old English poetry. Although there is still much debate as to how the manuscript wound up in Italy, at least some sources (discussed in Krapp, below) give credence to the theory that Guala Bicchieri brought it back with him when he returned from England. Bicchieri died in 1227 and is entombed in the Basilica di Sant'Andrea in Vercelli.

== Sources ==
- Chibnall, Marjorie (1999). "Review of: The letters and Charters of Cardinal Guala Bicchieri, Papal Legate in England, 1216–1218". The English Historical Review. 114 (457): 687–688. doi:10.1093/ehr/114.457.687.
- Chisholm, Hugh, ed. (1911). "Gualo, Cardinal" . Encyclopædia Britannica. Vol. 12 (11th ed.). Cambridge University Press. p. 648.
- "Guala Bicchieri". Dizionario biografico degli Italiani. Rome: Istituto della Enciclopedia Italiana. 1968.
- George, Krapp (1932). The Vercelli Book. New York: Columbia University Press. ISBN.
- Bolton, Brenda M. "Guala [Guala Bicchieri]". Oxford Dictionary of National Biography (online ed.). Oxford University Press. doi:10.1093/ref:odnb/50349. (Subscription, Wikipedia Library access or UK public library membership required.)
- Pagella, Enrica; Simonetta Castronovo, Simone Baioco (2004). Arte in Piemonte 2, il Gotico. Torino: Priuli & Verlucca. ISBN 88-8068-225-3.
- Ricerche sulla famiglia Bicchieri e la società vercellese dei secoli XII e XIII, Contributi dell'istituto di storia medioevale, 3rd ser., 1. Milan: Istituto di storia medioevale. 1981. pp. 207–259.
- Turner, Ralph W. (January 1999). "Review of: The letters and Charters of Cardinal Guala Bicchieri, Papal Legate in England, 1216–1218". Speculum. 47 (1): 124–126. doi:10.2307/2887278. JSTOR 2887278.
- Vincent, Nicolas, ed. (1996). The letters and Charters of Cardinal Guala Bicchieri, Papal Legate in England, 1216–1218. Rochester, New York; Woodbridge, Suff.: Canterbury and York Society. ISBN 0-907239-53-6.
