= John Sarrazin =

John Sarrazin, also known as Johannes Sarracenus, John the Sarracen or John Sarrazen, was a twelfth-century scholar. He is known only from his translation of the writings of Pseudo-Dionysius from Greek into Latin.

John Sarrazin was probably a friend of John of Salisbury. He may have written his commentary on the pseudo-Dionysian work On the Celestial Hierarchy around 1140. Then, in around 1167, he may have translated the works of Dionysius. Until this point, theologians in the Latin-speaking West had to read Dionysius using the ninth-century translation made by Johannes Scotus Eriugena, which was not easy to understand. In contrast, Sarrazin produced a clearer version which was used by Albert the Great and Thomas Aquinas, and had a significant effect on later European mystical writing. Only in the thirteenth century, with the translation of Dionysius made by Robert Grosseteste, and then the fifteenth century translation of Ambrose Traversari, did Sarrazin's translation become superseded.

Sareazin dedicated two of his translations to the abbot of the monastery of Saint-Denis, near Paris. By his own account, he toured Greece for research purposes and was excited by the work of John of Salisbury. It is believed that he lived for a time in Poitiers.

== Works ==
- Philippe Chevallier, ed, Dionysiaca. Recueil donnant l’ensemble des traditions latines des ouvrages attribués au Denys de l’Aréopagite, 4 vols, (Bruges, Désclée de Brouwer et Cie, 1937/50) [facsimile reprint as (Stuttgart: Verlag Frommann-Holzboog, 1989)] [contains the translation of pseudo-Dionysius]
