= Christ's College Bathing Pool =

Swimming pool at Christ's College, Cambridge, England

Christ's College Bathing Pool (the Malcolm Bowie pool)
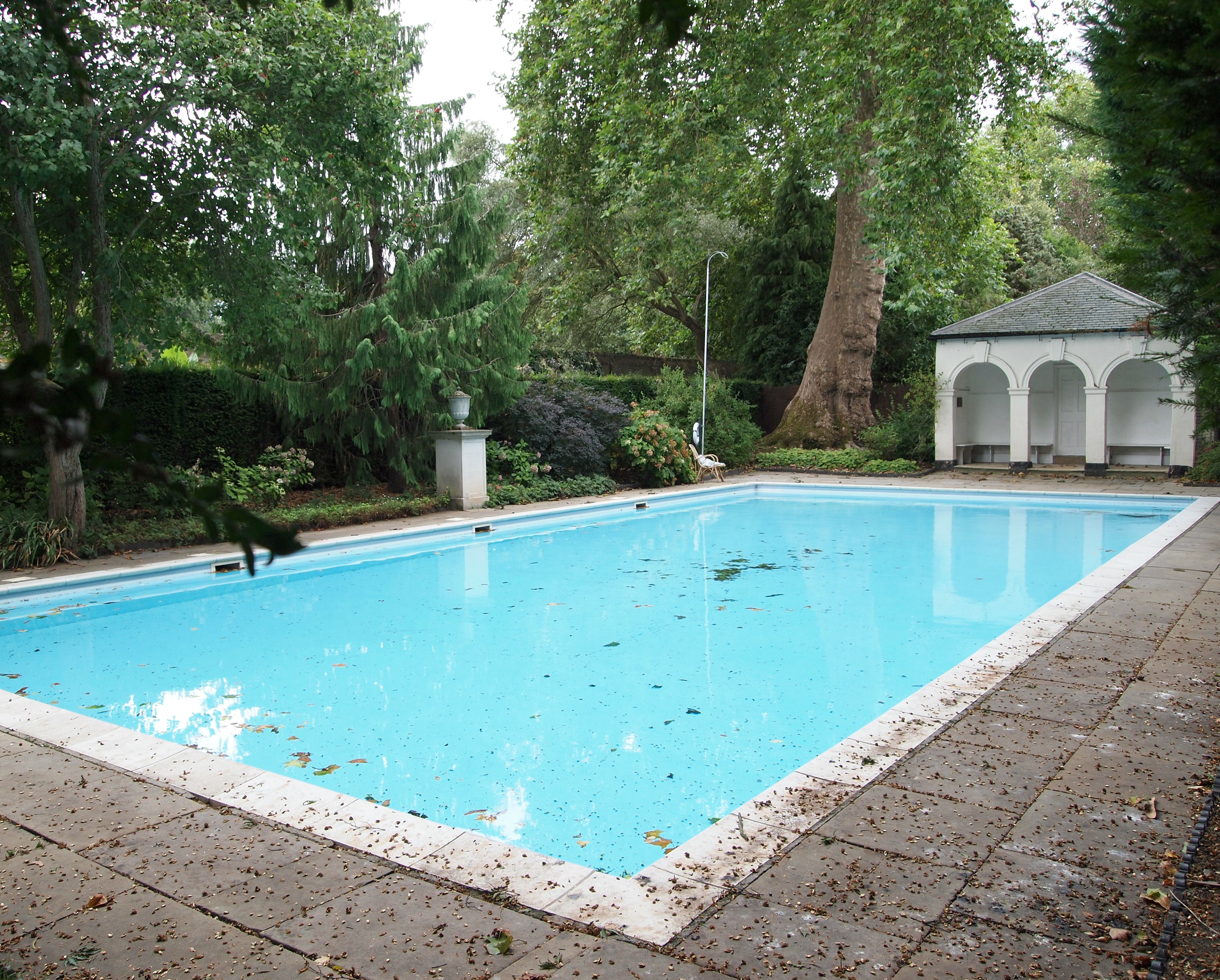
- The pool and summer house

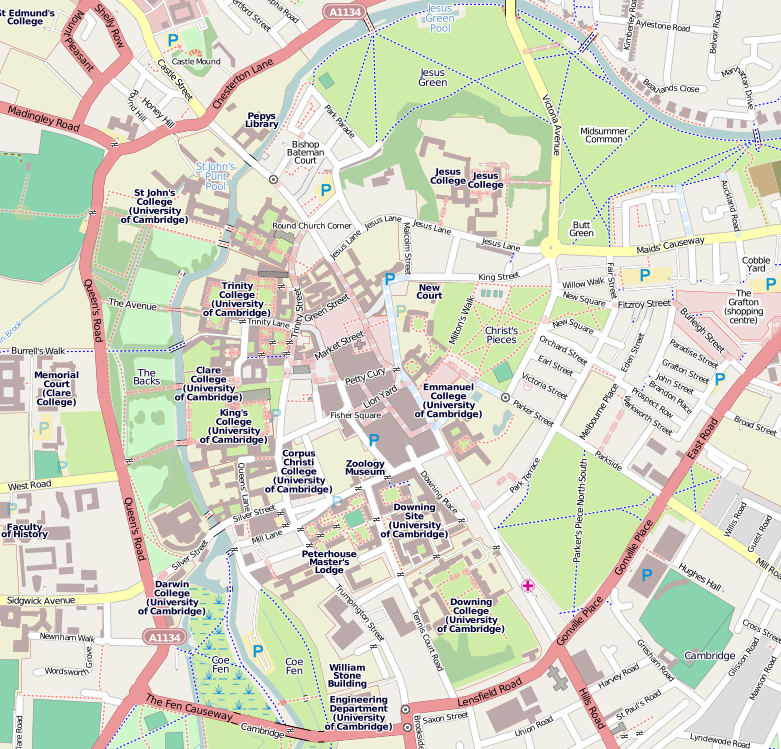
- Location within Central Cambridge
- 52.2069°N 0.1239°E
- Type: swimming pool
- Location: Christ's College, Cambridge, England

History
- Built: pre 1688

Site notes
- Architectural style: Neoclassical
- Governing body: Privately owned

Listed Building – Grade I
- Official name: Christ's College Bathing Pool and Summer House, including the busts of Cudworth, Milton and Saunderson and stone vase in memory of Joseph Mede
- Designated: 26 April 1950
- Reference no.: 1125548

Christ's College Bathing Pool is a swimming pool in the Fellows' Garden of Christ's College, Cambridge, England. Dating from the mid-17th century, the bathing pool is thought to be the oldest outdoor pool in England. It is a Grade I listed building.

== History ==
Christ's College bathing pool stands in the Fellows' Garden, to the north of the Fellows' Building, in the centre of Cambridge, England. (Note: The Christ's College archive holds a, now unique, college "gardening book", detailing the activities undertaken, and the expenditure incurred, in the garden between 1645 and 1714.) There is some debate as to the date of the pool's construction. Historic England states that the pool was in existence before 1688, and most sources follow this, supporting its claim to be the oldest outdoor swimming pool in England. Simon Bradley, in the Cambridgeshire volume in the Buildings of England series, revised and reissued in 2015, gives a later date, of the mid-18th century. The pool was originally fed by water from Hobson's Conduit, a watercourse developed in the early 17th century to bring fresh water to the city.

After a period of dilapidation at the end of the 20th century, the pool was renovated and reopened in 2010. It is now named the Malcolm Bowie Bathing Pool in honour of Malcolm Bowie, master of Christ's College from 2002 to 2006. The pool is a private pool, for the use of staff and students of the college. It is unheated.

== Architecture and description ==
The pool is rectangular, within a neoclassical setting, comprising the summer house at one end and busts on pillars of Ralph Cudworth, John Milton and Nicholas Saunderson at the other. (Note: Ralph Cudworth (1617-1688) was a philosopher and 14th master of Christ’s College; Nicholas Saunderson (1682-1739) was Lucasian Professor of Mathematics who studied at Christ’s; Joseph Mede (1586-1639) was a professor of Greek who also studied at the college. Milton was a student at Christ’s between 1625 and 1629.) There is also a vase in memory of Joseph Mede. Simon Bradley considered that the refurbishment somewhat compromised the pool's charm; "The poetry of this unique Georgian enclave vanished in 2010, when the pool was given a Costa del Sol lining of bright blue". The pool is a Grade I listed structure.

== Gallery ==
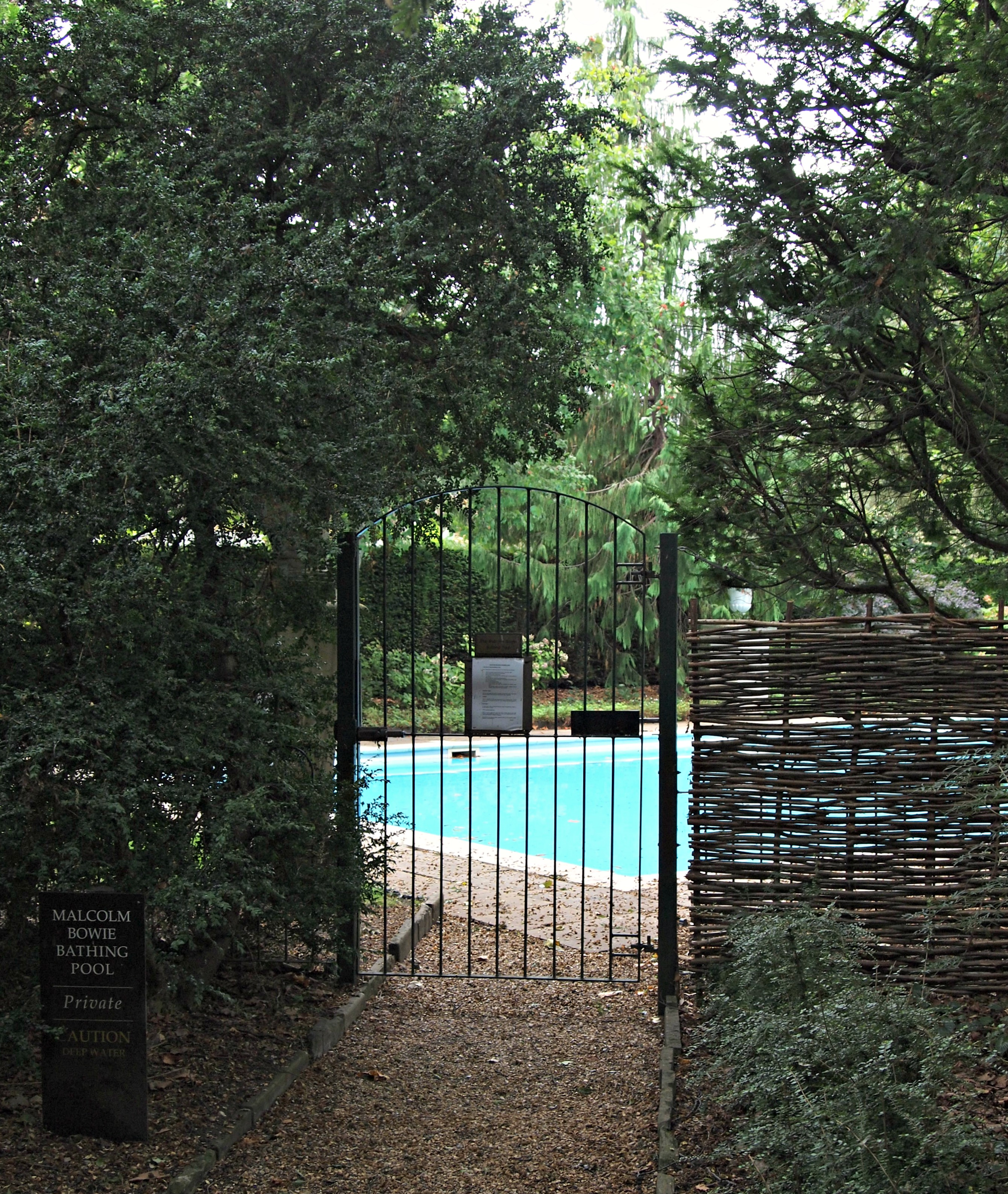
The entrance

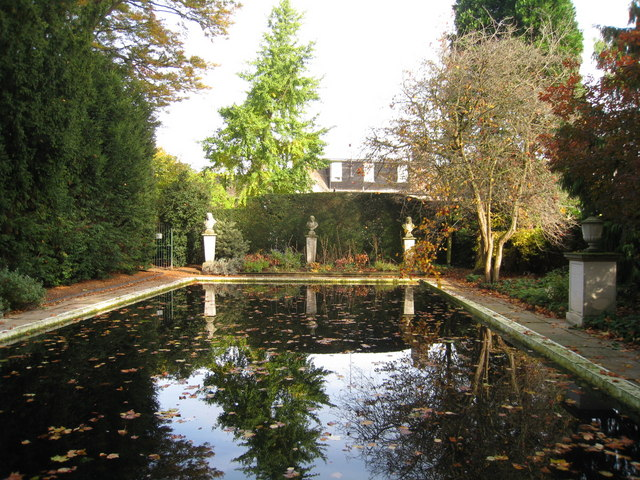
The pool in 2009, prior to restoration

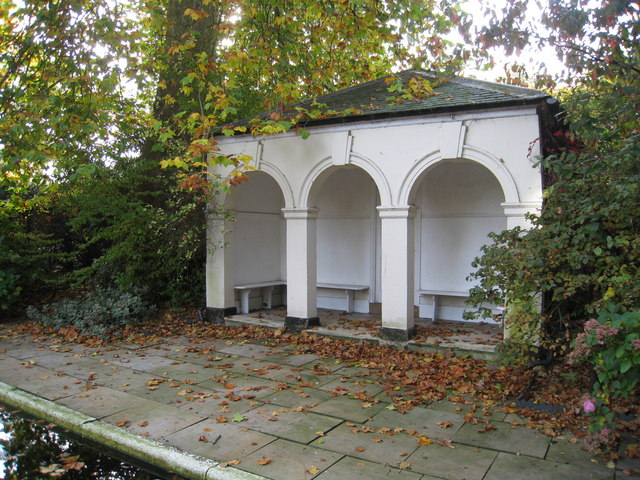
The summerhouse

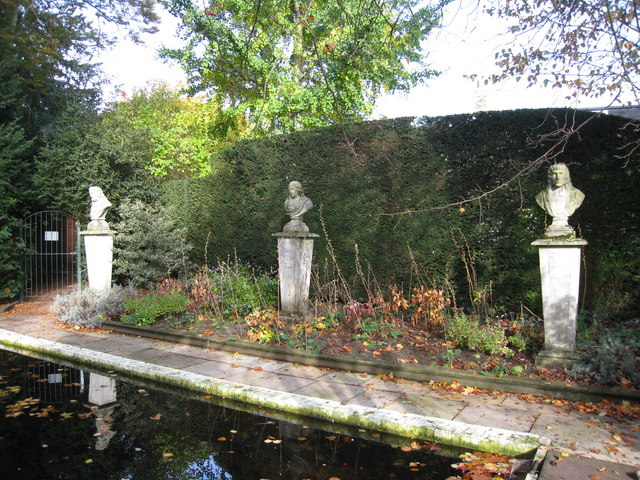
Busts of Ralph Cudworth, John Milton and Nicholas Saunderson

== Sources ==
- Bradley, Simon; Pevsner, Nikolaus (2015). Cambridgeshire. The Buildings of England. New Haven, US and London: Yale University Press. ISBN 978-0-300-20596-1.
- Richardson, Tim (2019). Cambridge College Gardens. London: Frances Lincoln. ISBN 978-0-711-24713-0.
