= Basilica di Sant'Andrea =

Monastery church in Piedmont, Italy

Coordinates: 45.32874°N 8.41923°E

The Basilica di Sant'Andrea

The Basilica di Sant'Andrea is the church of a monastery in Vercelli, Piedmont, northern Italy, founded in 1219 by Cardinal Guala Bicchieri and completed in 1227. It represents an early example of Gothic architecture in Italy, inspired by Cistercian models and featuring Romanesque elements as well.

== History ==
The basilica was built between 1219 and 1227 at the direction of Cardinal Guala Bicchieri, who had just returned from England where he had been papal legate. Bicchieri had received from King Henry III the perpetual rights to the income of St Andrew's Church, Chesterton, near Cambridge. Thanks to this financial support, the cardinal was able to call to Vercelli some Augustinian canons from Saint-Victor in Paris, giving them responsibility over the new abbey and the hospital to be built for the pilgrims who travelled the Via Francigena. The hospital was begun in 1224. Although the architect is unknown, it is presumed that the Gothic lines of the new edifice were introduced by the French clerics, who included abbot Thomas Gallus, previously a professor in the University of Paris. According to Italian art historian Giulio Carlo Argan, the architect could have been Benedetto Antelami. The style of the Romanesque elements connects the building to the architectural traditions of northern Italy and suggest the hand of an Italian master in the design.

Thanks to Bicchieri's diplomacy, the abbey was able to increase its possessions through donations and privileges from pope Honorius III and emperor Frederick II. Bicchieri died in Rome in 1227, the year in which the basilica was finished.

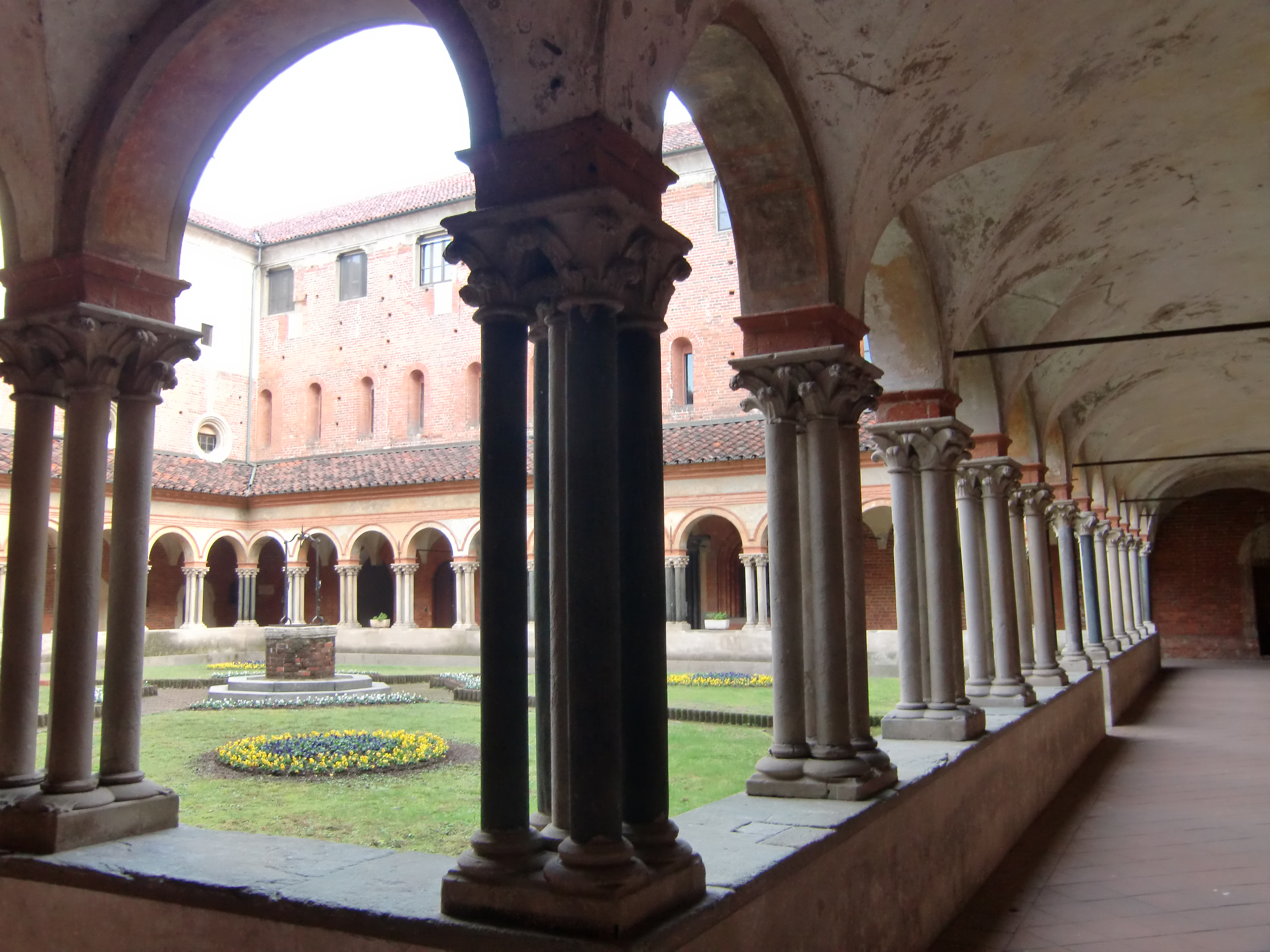
View of the cloister

In the early 15th century a new bell tower was built, in a detached position, on the right side of the church. In the following century the cloister of the monastery was rebuilt, though the original small columns – in groups of four – were kept.

The complex was damaged during the Siege of Vercelli of 1617. During restorations carried out in 1818–1840, the scrinium (travelling case) of Guala Bicchieri was found in the building; it is now in the Turin City Museum of Ancient Art. Other restorations took place in 1927 and 1955–1960.

== Description ==
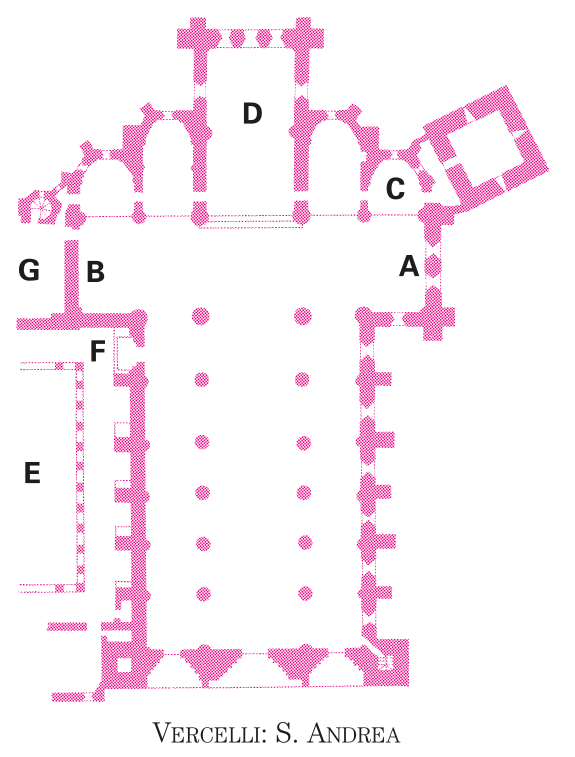
Plan of church

The basilica is built on the Latin cross plan, with a nave and two aisles of six bays each. The aisles are lower than the nave. The right aisle has buttresses from which flying buttresses (an element typical of Gothic architecture) connect it to the nave. The transept, of five bays, has the same width and height of the nave. At the crossing is a tall octagonal lantern tower, surmounted by a belfry, also octagonal, which ends with a pyramidal cusp in brickwork. The apse has a rectangular plan, a typical feature of Cistercian Gothic edifices.

The façade features stones of different types: green stone from Pralungo, calcarenite from Montferrat and serpentine from Oria. The stone is combined with the red brickwork and white cotto of the upper part of the two side bell towers. The wide gable of the central section, the two blind arcades and the big rose window in the middle are all elements in the tradition of Lombard-Emilian Romanesque architecture. The entrance is through three portals, also in Romanesque style, with four orders of small double columns. The lunette of the central portal has a relief depicting the "Martyrdom of St. Andrew", while that of the left portal shows "Cardinal Bicchieri offering the Church to St. Andrew, enthroned". Benedetto Antelami has been suggested as the author of the two sculptures, although it is more likely that they were executed by one or more of his pupils who had worked in the Baptistery of Parma.

The interior of the basilica is fully Gothic in style, with ogival arcades supported by piers formed by a cylindrical element surrounded by eight small columns. The ceiling has quadripartite vaults. The crossing tower is supported on four pendentives which are decorated with small columns over corbels; these reach other corbels in the lantern tower where are sculptures (from Antelami's school) representing symbols of the Four Evangelists. Beyond the crossing is the chancel, with the presbytery and the rectangular choir, which is illuminated by a large rose window and three mullioned windows, and has wooden seats from the early 16th century.

Artworks include the funerary monument of abbot Thomas Gallus (early 14th century), with a fresco of Lombard school. In the first chapel in the left arm of the transept is a 15th-century painted crucifix.

== Sources ==
- S. Baiocco, S. Castronovo, E. Pagella, Arte in Piemonte. Il Gotico, 2004, Priuli e Verlucca Editori, Ivrea, ISBN 88-8068-225-3
- G. Vergani, "L'Italia settentrionale. Le contaminazioni del Gotico", in La Storia dell'Arte, Vol 5, cap. 13, 2006, Electa and La Biblioteca di Repubblica, Milan
- M. Cappellino, Il coro ligneo della basilica di S. Andrea. Agiografia Canonicale in un codice vercellese, 1989, Vercelli
