= Chesterton, Cambridge =

Suburb of Cambridge, England

Coordinates: 52°13′06.62″N 000°08′29.20″E

Chesterton
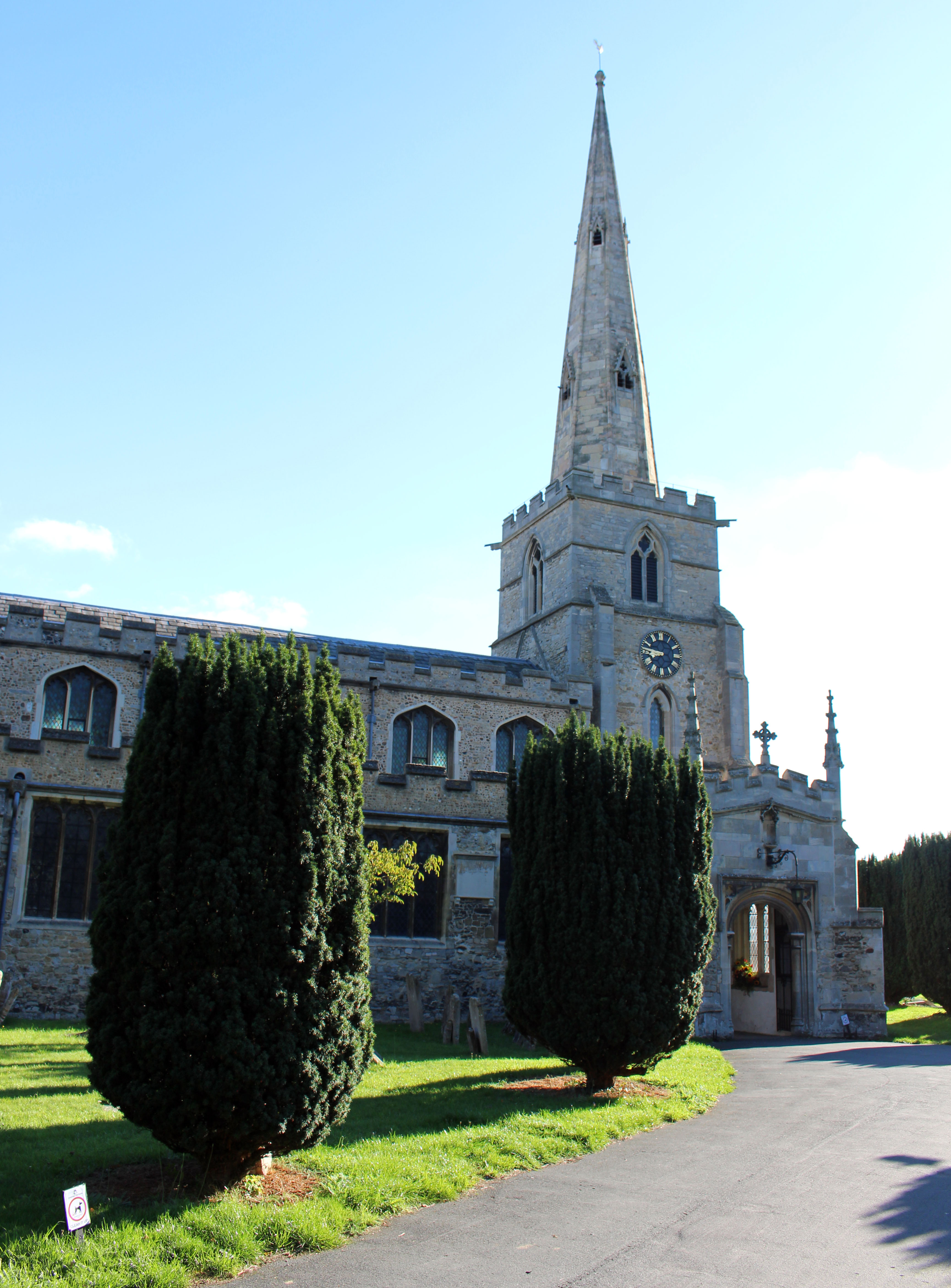
- St Andrew's Church, Chesterton

- Location within Cambridgeshire
- District: Cambridge
- Shire county: Cambridgeshire
- Region: East
- Country: England
- Sovereign state: United Kingdom
- Post town: CAMBRIDGE
- Postcode district: CB4
- Dialling code: 01223

Chesterton is a suburb in Cambridge, in the county of Cambridgeshire, England. As of the 2021 UK census, the suburb had a population of 18,620 people.

== History ==
Archaeological evidence indicates that the area that is now Chesterton has been inhabited since at least the Bronze Age. In Anglo-Saxon times Chesterton formed part of a larger vill spanning the River Cam. The rest of the vill became the borough of Cambridge sometime after the 8th century, but Chesterton was excluded from the early borough.

Chesterton was an ancient parish. The parish included the village and adjoining rural areas generally to the north of it; at the western end of the parish it included Cambridge Castle. A terrier (land survey) of John Chettoe's property in Chesterton dating to 1768 (including a transcript of one from 1694) survive in Cambridgeshire Archives.

Chesterton was governed by its parish vestry and manorial courts in the same way as most rural areas until 1880, when the parish was made a local government district, governed by an elected local board. Such districts were reconstituted as urban districts under the Local Government Act 1894. Cambridge Borough Council made numerous attempts to annex Chesterton; on three occasions between 1897 and 1909 the electorate of Chesterton voted against it being absorbed into Cambridge.

Chesterton Urban District was abolished in 1912. The more urban southern third of the parish, including the original village, was then absorbed into the borough of Cambridge, and the (then) more rural north of the parish was transferred to the neighbouring parish of Milton. The reduced civil parish of Chesterton continued to exist after 1912 covering just the parts of Chesterton which had been incorporated into Cambridge, but as an urban parish it had no longer had a council of its own. The civil parish of Chesterton was abolished in 1923 when all the parishes in the borough of Cambridge were united into a single parish. In 1921, the last census before its abolition, Chesterton parish had a population of 11,611. The more rural parts of the old Chesterton parish which had been transferred to Milton in 1912 were brought into the borough of Cambridge in a subsequent boundary review in 1934, and were developed during the 20th century with the growing suburbs of Cambridge.

A large housing association estate makes up part of the East Chesterton area.

== Governance ==
Chesterton contains two electoral wards (West Chesterton and East Chesterton) in the city of Cambridge. The total population of both wards at the 2021 Census was 18,620, representing a rise of 2.7% in ten years since the 2011 Census. These are roughly the same as the area normally called Chesterton: specifically the land north of the River Cam, east of Castle Hill and south of the Arbury and King's Hedges estates.

City councillors for the East Chesterton ward are Gerri Bird, Alice Gilderdale and Baiju Thittala. City councillors for the West Chesterton ward are Sam Carling, Richard Swift and Rachel Wade. As county council divisions are different from city council wards, parts of the Chesterton area are covered by the Chesterton ward councillor Gerri Bird and Castle ward councillor Catherine Rae.

== Transport ==
Buses run seven times an hour to Cambridge city centre and six times an hour to each of Milton and Addenbrooke's Hospital.

Milton Road (the A1309 and A1134) is the major arterial road through Chesterton, linking the centre of Cambridge to the southwest with the A14 road to the northeast.

Cambridge North railway station, built on the edge of East Chesterton, became operational in May 2017, something that had been campaigned for by numerous local politicians for decades.

== Notable people ==
- Horace Gray (1874–1938), cricketer
- Leo Reid (1888–1938), cricketer
- Veronica Volkersz (1917–2000) aviator, Air Transport Auxiliary pilot in the Second World War, first woman to fly an operational jet fighter

== Gallery ==
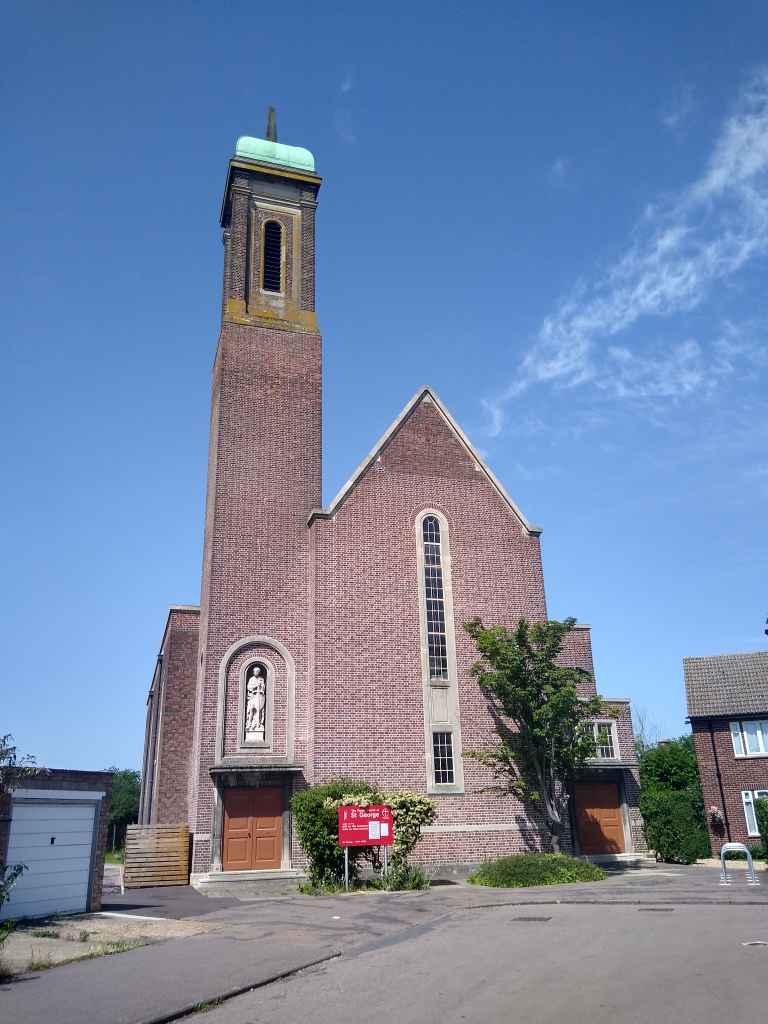
Church of St George

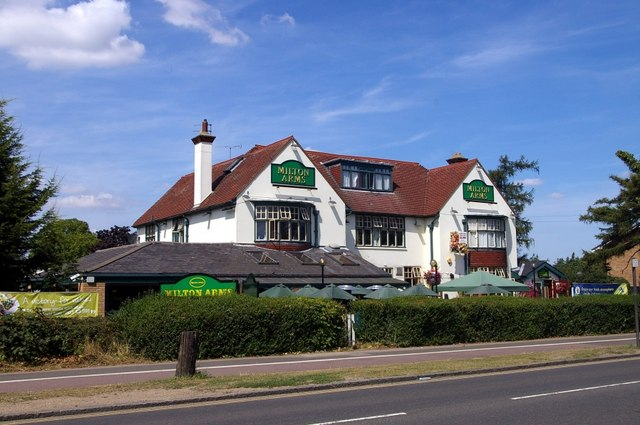
The Milton Arms pub

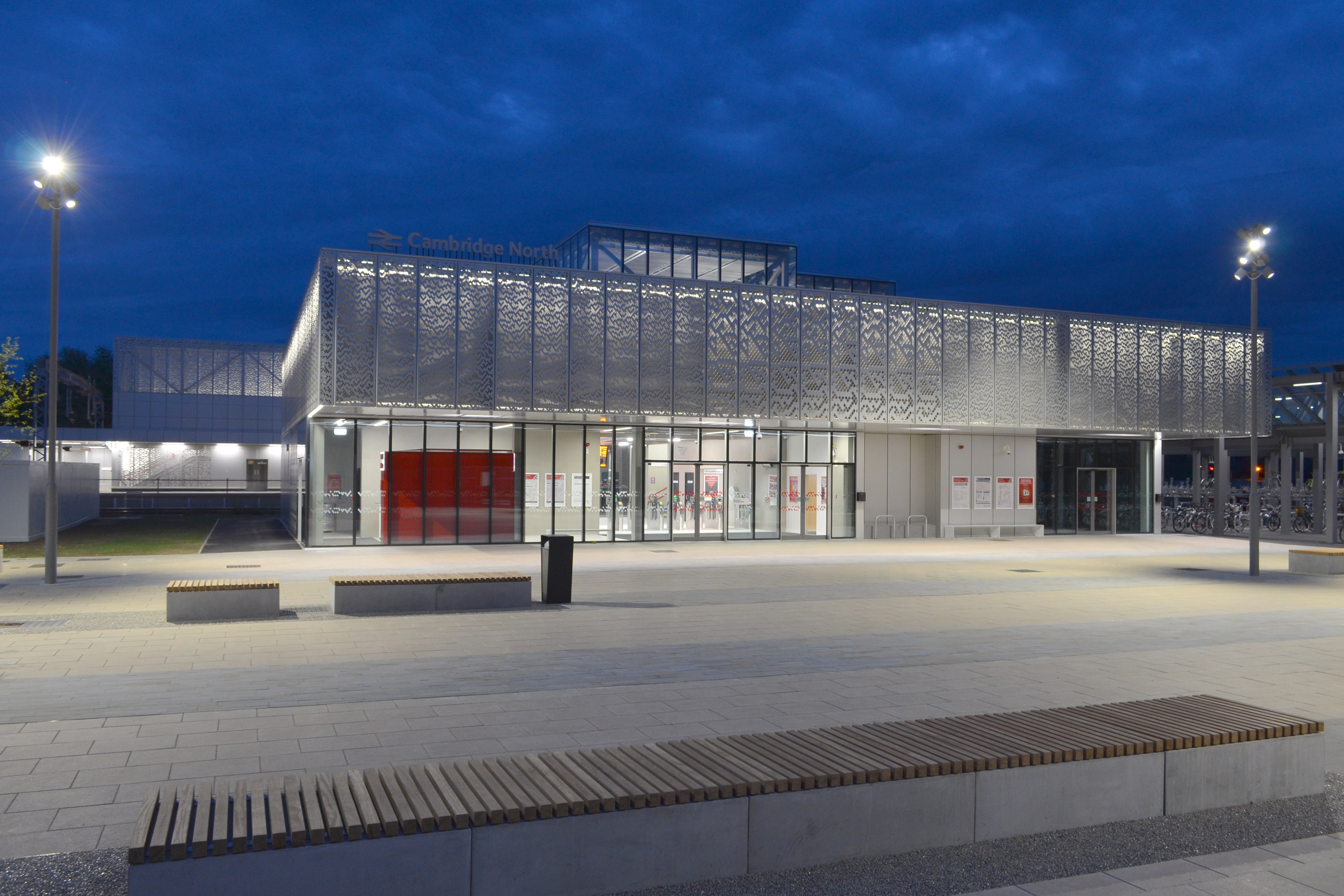
Cambridge North railway station at night

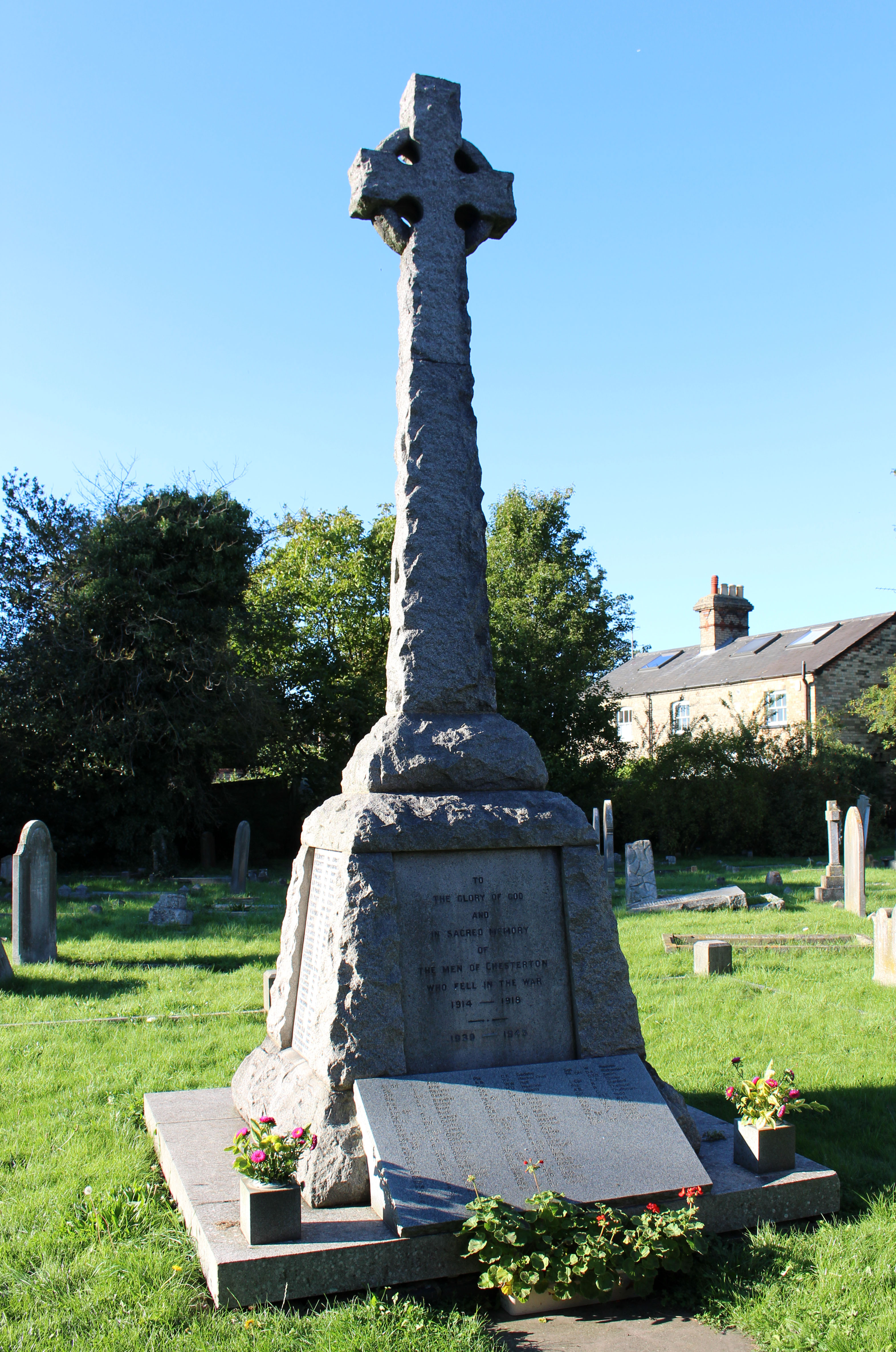
Chesterton War Memorial

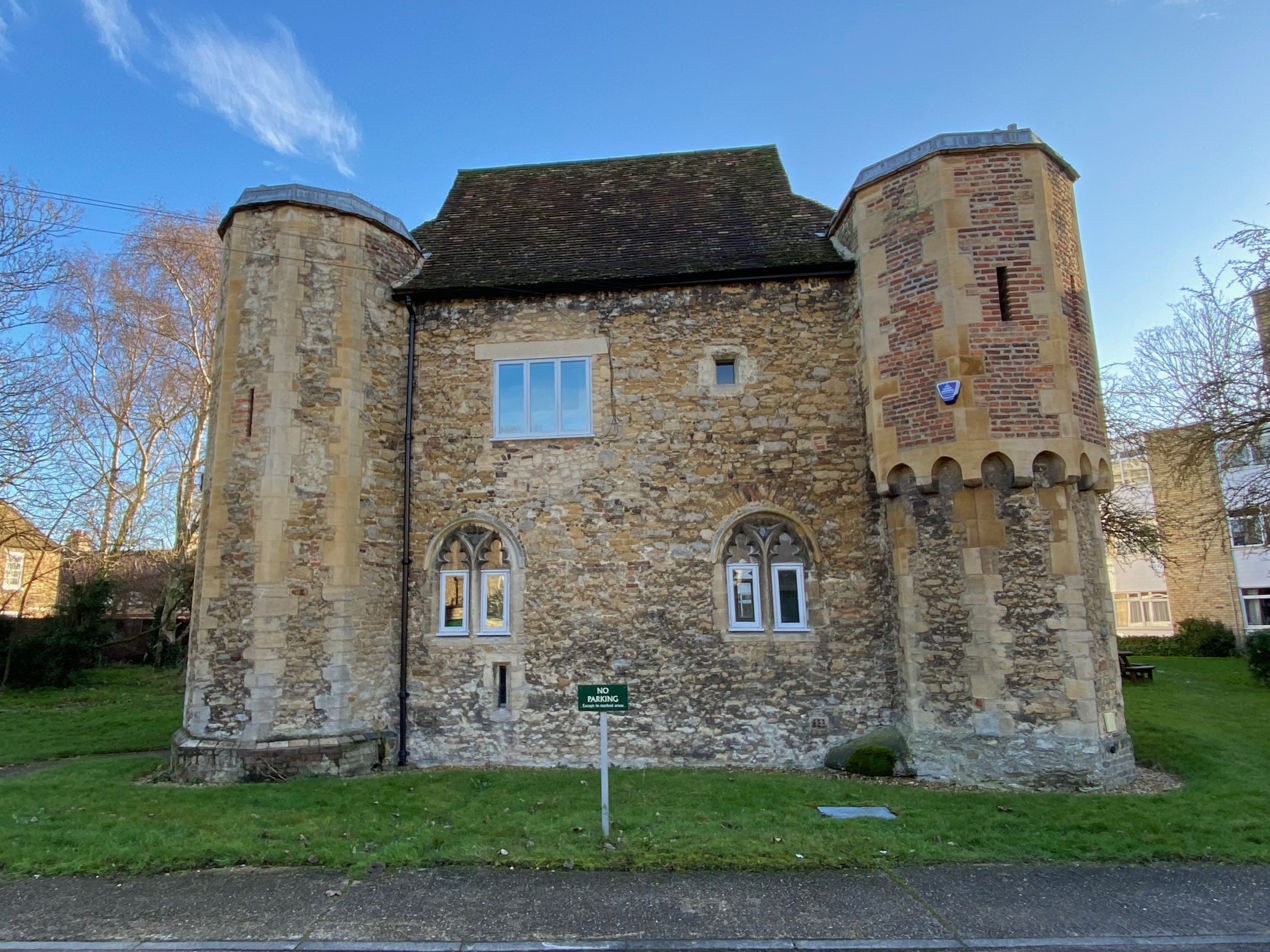
Chesterton Tower

== See also ==
- Chesterton Tower A medieval dwelling
- Chesterton (UK Parliament constituency) A former constituency
- Chesterton railway station Closed 1850
- Chesterton Road
- St Andrew's Church, Chesterton
