= Patrologia Latina =

1841–1855 collection of Christian texts

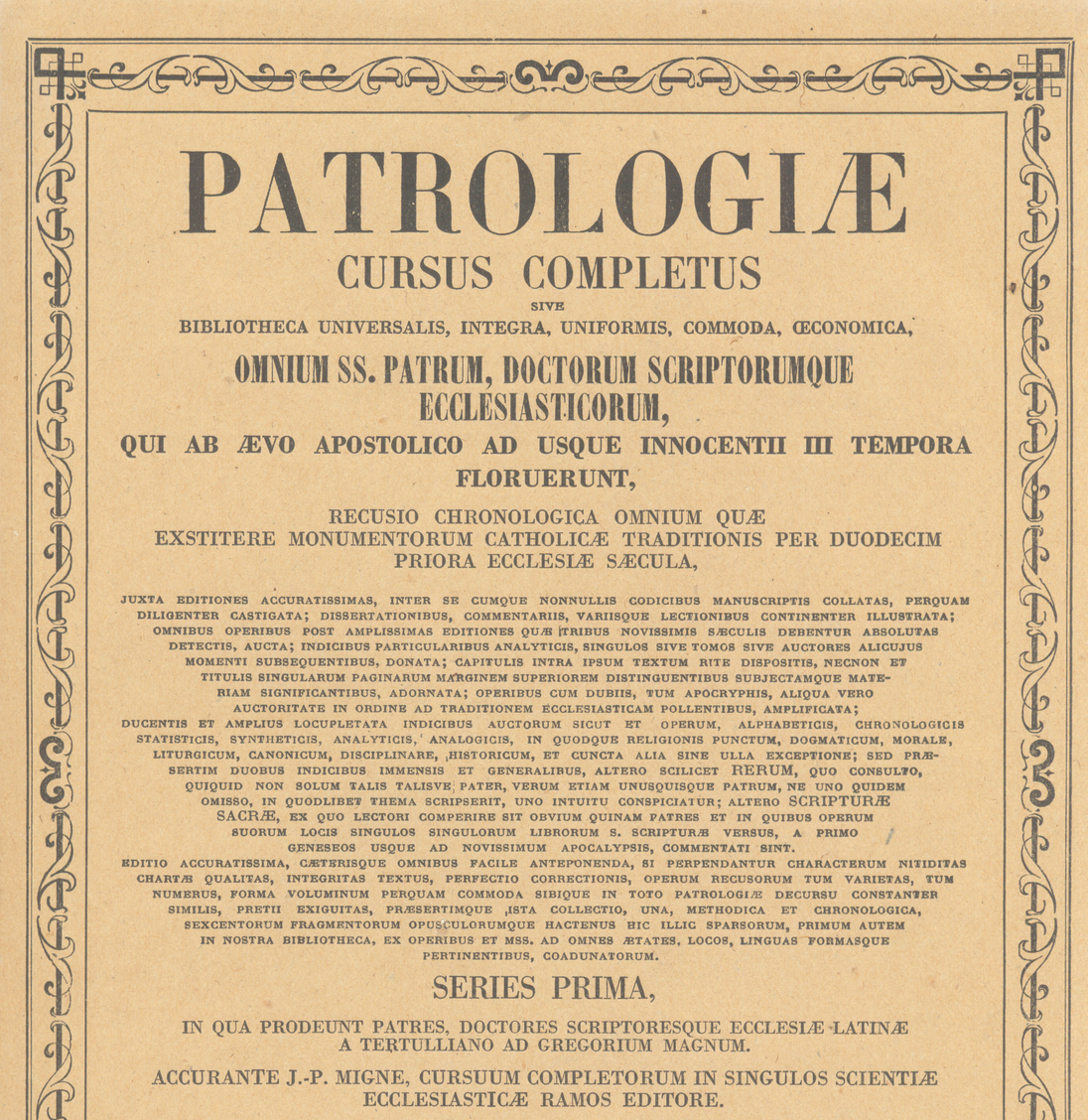
Patrologia Latina (title page, vol. 5, Paris, 1844)

The Patrologia Latina (Latin for 'The Latin Patrology') is an enormous collection of the writings of the Church Fathers and other ecclesiastical writers published by Jacques Paul Migne between 1841 and 1855, with indices published between 1862 and 1865. It is also known as the Latin series as it formed one half of Migne's Patrologiae Cursus Completus, the other part being the Patrologia Graeca of patristic and medieval Greek works with their (sometimes non-matching) medieval Latin translations.

Although consisting of reprints of old editions, which often contain mistakes and do not comply with modern standards of scholarship, the series, due to its availability (it is present in many academic libraries) and the fact that it incorporates many texts of which no modern critical edition is available, is still widely used by scholars of the Middle Ages and is in this respect comparable to the Monumenta Germaniae Historica.

The Patrologia Latina includes Latin works spanning a millennium, from Tertullian (d. 230) to Pope Innocent III (d. 1216), edited in roughly chronological order in 217 volumes:

- Volumes 1 to 73, from Tertullian to Gregory of Tours, were published from 1841 to 1849, and volumes 74 to 217, from Pope Gregory I to Innocent III, from 1849 to 1855.

Although the collection ends with Innocent III, Migne originally wanted to include documents all the way up to the Protestant Reformation; this task proved too great, but some later commentaries or documents associated with earlier works were included. Most of the works are ecclesiastic in nature, but there are also documents of literary, historical, or linguistic (such as the Gothic Bible in vol. 18) interest.

The original printing plates for the Patrologia were destroyed by fire in 1868. However, with help from the Garnier printing house they were restored, and new editions were printed beginning in the 1880s. The content within these reprints is not always identical to the original series, in either quality or internal arrangement. The new editions have been described as "inferior in a number of respects to Migne's own first editions".

== Table of contents ==
The Patrologia Latina contains authors of the 2nd to 13th centuries, in roughly chronological order, in 217 volumes:

- 2nd–4th c.: 1–19;
- 4th–5th c.: 20–63;
- 5th–6th c.: 64–72;
- 6th–7th c.: 74–88;
- 7th–8th c.: 89–96;
- 8th–9th c.: 97–130;
- 9th/10th c.: 131–136;
- 10th/11th c.: 137–149;
- 11th/12th c.: 151–174;
- 12th c.: 175–205;
- 12th/13th c.: 206–217.

Authors included in the Patrologia, listed by volume
Vol.	Authors
1–2	Tertullianus
3–5	Minucius Felix, Dionysius Alexandrinus, Cornelius papa, Novatianus, Stephanus I, Cyprianus Carthaginensis, Arnobius Afer, Commodianus Gazaeus
6–7	Lactantius
8	Constantinus I, Victorinus Petavionensis
9–10	Hilarius Pictaviensis
11	Zeno Veronensis, Optatus Milevitanus
12	Eusebius Vercellensis, Firmicus Maternus
13	Damasus, Pacianus, Lucifer Calaritanus
14–17	Ambrosius Mediolanensis
18	Ulfilas Gothorum, Symmachus, Martinus Turonensis, Tichonius
19	Juvencus, Sedulius Coelius, Optatianus, Severus Rhetor, Faltonia Proba
20	Sulpicius Severus, Paulinus Mediolanensis, Faustus Manichaeus, Innocentius I, Aurelius Episcopus Carthaginensis
21	Rufinus Aquileiensis, Pelagius haeresiarcha
22–30	Hieronymus Stridonensis
31	Flavius Lucius Dexter, Paulus Orosius
32–47	Augustinus Hipponensis
48	Marius Mercator
49–50	Joannes Cassianus
51	Prosper Aquitanus
52	Petrus Chrysologus
53	Mamertus Claudianus, Salvianus Massiliensis, Arnobius junior, Patricius Hiberniae
54–56	Leo I
57	Maximus Taurinensis
58	Hilarus papa, Simplicius papa, Felix III
59	Gelasius I, Avitus Viennensis, Faustinus
60	Aurelius Prudentius, Dracontius
61	Paulinus Nolanus, Orientius, Auspicius Tullensis
62	Paschasius Diaconus, Sanctus Symmachus, Petrus Diaconus, Virgilius Tapsensis, Leo I Magnus, Concilium Chalcedonense, Athanasius, Rusticus Helpidius, Eugyppius Africae
63	Boetius, Ennodius Felix, Trifolius presbyter, Hormisdas I, Elpis
64	Boetius
65	Fulgentius Ruspensis, Felix IV, Bonifacius II
66	Benedictus pater monachorum Occidentalium
67	Dionysius Exiguus, Viventiolus Lugdunensis, Trojanus Santonensis, Pontianus Africae, Caesarius Arelatensis, Fulgentius Ferrandus
68	Primasius Adrumetanus, Arator, Nicetius Trevirensis, Aurelianus Arelatensis
69–70	Cassiodorus
71	Gregorius Turonensis
72	Pelagius II, Joannes II, Benedictus I
73–74	Vitae Patrum
75–78	Gregorius I
79	Eutropius Episcopus, Gregorius I, Paterius (Notarius Gregorii I), Alulfus Tornacensis
80	Auctores VI-VII saec. (Maximus Caesaraugustanus Episcopus, Eutropius of Valencia, Tarra Monachus, Dinothus Abbas, Dynamus Patricius, Augustinus Apostolus Anglorum, SS Bonifacius IV, Concilium Romanum III, Bulgaranus, Paulus Emeritanus Diaconus, Tamaius De Vargas. Thomas, Gondemarus Rex Gothorum, Marcus Cassinensis, Warnaharius Lingonensis Episcopus, Columbanus Hibernus, Alphanus Beneventianus Episcopus, Aileranus Scoto Hibernus, Ethelbertus Anglorum, SS Adeodatus I, Sisebutus Gothorum, Bertichramnus Cenomanensis, Protandius Vesuntinus Archiepiscopus, Pope Boniface V, Sonniatus Rhemensis Archiepiscopus, Verus Ruthenensis Episcopus, Chlotarius II Francorum Rex, Pope Honorius I, Dagobertus Francorum Rex, Hadoinudus Cenomanensis Episcopus, Sulpicius Bituricensis Episcopus, Autbertus Cameracensis, SS Ioannes IV, Eutrandus Ticinensis Diaconus, Victor Carthaginensis Episcopus, Braulio Caesaraugustiani, Taio Caesaraugustianus Episcopus)
81–84	Isidorus Hispalensis
85–86	Liturgia Mozarabica
87	Auctores VII saec.
88	Venantius Fortunatus, Crisconius Africanus
89	Sergius I, Joannes VI, Felix Ravennatensis, Bonifacius Moguntinus
90–94	Beda
95	Beda, Paulus Winfridus
96	Hildefonsus Toletanus, Julianus Toletanus, Leo II
97–98	Carolus Magnus, Ludovicus I, Lotharius, Rudolphus I
99	Paulinus Aquileiensis, Theodorus Cantuariensis
100–101	Alcuinus
102	Smaragdus S. Michaelis
103	Benedictus Anianensis, Ardo Smaragdus, Sedulius Scotus, Grimlaicus
104	Agobardus Lugdunensis, Eginhardus, Claudius Taurinensis, Ludovicus Pius
105	Theodulfus Aurelianensis, Eigil Fuldensis, Dungalus reclusus, Ermoldus Nigellus, Symphosius Amalarius
106	Gregorius IV, Sergius II, Jonas Aurelianensis, Freculphus Lexoviensis, Frotharius Tullensis
107–112	Rabanus Maurus
113–114	Walafridus Strabo, the Glossa Ordinaria
115	Leo IV, Benedictus III, Eulogius Toletanus, Speraindeo, Prudentius Trecensis, Angelomus Lexoviensis
116–118	Haymo Halberstatensis
119	Nicolaus I, Florus Lugdunensis, Lupus Ferrariensis
120	Paschasius Radbertus
121	Ratramnus Corbeiensis, Aeneas Parisiensis, Remigius Lugdunensis, Wandalbertus Prumiensis, Paulus Alvarus Cordubensis, Gotteschalcus Orbacensis
122	Johannes Scotus Eriugena
123	Ado Viennensis
124	Usuardus Sangermanii, Carolus II Calvus
125–126	Hincmarus Rhemensis
127–129	Anastasius bibliothecarius
130	Isidorus Mercator
131	Remigius Antissiodorensis, Notkerus Balbulus
132	Regino Prumiensis, Hucbaldus S. Amandi
133	Odo Cluniacensis
134	Atto Vercellensis
135	Flodoardus Remensis, Joannes XIII
136	Ratherius Veronensis, Liutprandus Cremonensis
137	Hrothsuita Gandersheimensis, Widukindus Corbeiensis, Dunstanus Cantuariensis, Adso Dervensis, Joannes S. Arnulfi Metensis
138	Richerus S. Remigii
139	Sylvester II (Gerbertus), Aimoinus Floriacensis, Abbo Floriacensis, Thietmarus Merseburgensis
140	Burchardus Wormaciensis, Henricus II imperator, Adelboldus Trajectensis, Thangmarus Hildesheimensis
141	Fulbertus Carnotensis, Guido Aretinus, Joannes XIX
142	Bruno Herbipolensis, Odilo Cluniacensis, Berno Augiae Divitis
143	Hermannus Contractus, Humbertus Silvae Candidae, Leo IX
144–145	Petrus Damianus
146	Othlonus S. Emmerammi, Adamus Bremensis, Gundecharus Eichstetensis, Lambertus Hersfeldensis, Petrus Malleacensis
147	Joannes Abrincensis, Bertholdus Constantiensis, Bruno Magdeburgensis, Marianus Scottus, Landulfus Mediolanensis, Alphanus Salernitanus
148	Gregorius VII
149	Victor III, Anselmus Lucensis, Willelmus Calculus
150	Lanfrancus Cantuariensis, Herluinus Beccensis, Willelmus Beccensis Abbas, Boso Beccensis Abbas, Theobaldus Beccensis Abbas, Letardus Beccensis Abbas, Augustinus Cantuariensis Episcopus, Bonizio Sutrensis Placentinus Episcopus, Guillelmus Metensis Abbas, Wilhelmus Hirsaugensis Abbas, Herimannus Metensis Episcopus, Theodoricus S Audoeni Monachus, Guido Farfensis Abbas, Aribo Scholasticus, Henricus Pomposianus Clericus, Robertus De Tumbalena Abbas, Gerardus Cameracensis Episcopus II, Reynaldus Remensis Archiepiscopus I, Joannes Cotto, Fulco Corbeiensis Abbas, Gillebertus Elnonensis Monachus, Willelmus Clusiensis Monachus, Durandus Claromontanus Episcopus, Hemmingus Wigorniensis Monachus, Radbodus Tornacensis Episcopus, Agano Augustodunensis Episcopus, Oldaricus Praepositus, Bernardus Lutevensis Episcopus, Fulcoius Meldensis Subdiaconus, Constantinus Africanus Casinensis, Deusdedit Cardinalis, Willelmus Pictavensis Archidiaconus, Joannes De Garlandia, Rufinus Episcopus
151	Urbanus II
152–153	Bruno Carthusianorum
154	Hugo Flaviniacensis, Ekkehardus Uraugiensis, Wolphelmus Brunwillerensis
155	Godefridus Bullonius, Radulfus Ardens, Lupus Protospatarius
156	Guibertus S. Mariae de Novigento
157	Goffridus Vindocinensis, Thiofridus Efternacensis, Petrus Alphonsus
158–159	Anselmus Cantuariensis
160	Sigebertus Gemblacensis
161	Ivo Carnotensis
162	Ivo Carnotensis, Petrus Chrysolanus, Anselmus Laudunensis
163	Paschalis II, Gelasius II, Calixtus II
164–165	Bruno Astensis
166	Baldricus Dolensis, Honorius II, Cosmas Pragensis
167–170	Rupertus Tuitensis
171	Hildebertus Turonensis, Marbodus Redonensis
172	Honorius Augustodunensis
173	Leo Marsicanus, Petrus diaconus, Rodulfus S. Trudonis
174	Godefridus Admontensis
175–177	Hugo de S. Victore
178	Petrus Abaelardus
179	Willelmus Malmesburiensis
180	Eugenius III, Guillelmus S. Theodorici
181	Herveus Burgidolensis
182–185	Bernardus Claraevallensis
186	Sugerius S. Dionysii, Robertus Pullus, Zacharias Chrysopolitanus
187	Gratianus
188	Ordericus Vitalis, Anastasius IV, Adrianus IV
189	Petrus Venerabilis
190	Thomas Cantuariensis, Herbertus de Boseham, Gilbertus Foliot
191–192	Petrus Lombardus
193	Garnerius S. Victoris, Gerhohus Reicherspergensis
194	Gerhohus Reicherspergensis, Hugo Pictavinus, Isaac de Stella, Alcherus Claraevallensis
195	Eckbertus Abas Schonaugiensis, Elisabeth Schonaugiensis, Aelredus Rievallensis, Wolbero S. Pantaleonis
196	Richardus S. Victoris
197	Hildegardis abbatissa
198	Adamus Scotus, Petrus Comestor, Godefridus Viterbiensis
199	Joannes Saresberiensis
200	Alexander III
201	Arnulfus Lexoviensis, Guillelmus Tyrensis
202	Petrus Cellensis, Urbanus III, Gregorius VIII, Hugo Eterianus, Gilbertus Foliot
203	Philippus de Harveng
204	Reinerus S. Laurentii Leodiensis, Clemens III
205	Petrus Cantor, Gernerius Lingonensis episcopus, Gaufridus subprior canonicorum regularium, Mauricius de Sulliaco Parisiensis episcopus, Odo Tullensis episcopus, Alexander Gemmeticensis abbas, Geraldus Cadurcensis episcopus, Matthaeus Vindocinensis
206	Coelestinus III, Thomas Cisterciensis, Joannes Algrinus
207	Petrus Blesensis
208	Martinus Legionensis
209	Martinus Legionensis, Wilhelmus Daniae, Gualterus de Castellione
210	Alanus de Insulis
211	Stephanus Tornacensis, Petrus Pictaviensis, Adamus Perseniae
212	Helinandus Frigidi Montis, Guntherus Cisterciensis, Odo de Soliaco
213	Sicardus Cremonensis, Petrus Sarnensis
214–217	Innocentius III vol. 214 vol. 215vol. 216
218–221	Indices

== Authors by rank or background ==
=== Secular rulers ===
- Byzantine emperor Alexios I Komnenos (vol. 155)
- Crusader King Baldwin I of Jerusalem (155)
- Roman emperor Constantine I (8)
- Frankish Emperor Charlemagne (97–98)
- King Charles the Bald (124)
- Crusader Godfrey of Bouillon (155)
- Saint Henry II, Holy Roman Emperor (140)
- Emperor Lothair I (97–98)
- King Louis the Pious (104)
- King Louis VII of France (155)

=== Popes ===
- Pope Adrian IV (188)
- Pope Alexander III (200)
- Pope Anastasius IV (188)
- Pope Benedict I (72)
- Pope Benedict III (115)
- Pope Boniface II (64)
- Pope Calixtus II (163)
- Pope Celestine III (206)
- Pope Clement III (204)
- Pope Cornelius (3)
- Pope Eugene III (180)
- Pope Felix III (58)
- Pope Felix IV (64)
- Pope Gelasius I (59)
- Pope Gelasius II (163)
- Pope Gregory I (75–79)
- Pope Gregory IV (106)
- Pope Gregory VIII (202)
- Pope Hilarius (58)
- Pope Honorius II (166)
- Pope Hormisdas (63)
- Pope Innocent III (214–217)
- Pope John II (72)
- Pope John VI (89)
- Pope John XIII (135)
- Pope John XIX (141)
- Pope Innocent I (20)
- Pope Leo I (54–56)
- Pope Leo II (96)
- Pope Leo IV (115)
- Pope Nicholas I (119)
- Pope Paschal II (163)
- Pope Pelagius II (72)
- Pope Sergius I (89)
- Pope Sergius II (106)
- Pope Simplicius (58)
- Pope Stephen I (3)
- Pope Sylvester II (139)
- Pope Leo IX (143)
- Pope Gregory VII (148)
- Pope Victor III (149)
- Pope Urban II (151)
- Pope Urban III (202)

=== Other bishops ===
- Absalon, bishop of Roskilde, Danish statesman and archbishop of Lund (209)
- Adalberon, bishop of Laon (141)
- Aldhelm, Bishop of Sherborne (89)
- Bishop Saint Ambrose of Milan (14–17)
- Archbishop Anselm of Canterbury (158–159)
- Bishop Anselm of Lucca (149)
- Bishop Saint Augustine of Hippo (32–47)
- Bishop Avitus of Vienne (59)
- Bishop Baldric of Dol-en-Bretagne (166)
- Saint Cassian of Imola, bishop of Brescia (49–50)
- Bishop of Poitiers Gilbert de la Porrée (64)
- Bishop Saint Gregory of Tours (71)
- Bishop Saint Hilary of Arles (50)
- Bishop Saint Hilary of Poitiers, Doctor of the Church (9–10)
- Bishop Saint Isidore of Seville (81–84)
- Bishop Ivo of Chartres (161–162)
- Bishop of Chartres John of Salisbury (199)
- Archbishop of Canterbury Lanfranc (150)
- Bishop Liutprand of Cremona (136)
- Bishop Saint Martin of Tours (18)
- Bishop of Paris Maurice de Sully (200)
- Bishop Odo of Bayeux (155)
- Missionary Bishop Saint Patrick (53)
- Bishop Saint Paulinus of Nola (61)
- Bishop of Paris Peter Lombard (191–192)
- Archbishop of Canterbury Theodore of Tarsus (99)
- Bishop Thietmar of Merseburg (139)
- Archbishop of Canterbury Saint Thomas Becket (190)
- Missionary Bishop Ulfilas, bible translator into Gothic (18)
- Archbishop William of Tyre (201)

=== Other clerics ===
- Abbot Abbo of Fleury (139)
- Abbot Adam of Perseigne (211)
- Adémar de Chabannes (141)
- Alger of Liège (180)
- archdeacon Anselm of Laon (162)
- Abbot Saint Benedict of Aniane (103)
- Abbot Saint Benedict of Nursia (66)
- Abbot Saint Bernard of Clairvaux, Doctor of the Church (182–185)
- Presbyter Coelius Sedulius, poet (19)
- Monk Dionysius Exiguus (Dennis the Little or Dennis the Short) (67)
- Dudon or Dudo of Saint-Quentin, dean of Saint-Quentin (141)
- Helinand of Froidmont (212)
- Gildas of Rhuys and Llancarfan (69)
- Monk Honorius of Autun (172)
- Monk Hugh of St. Victor, philosopher (175–177)
- Abbot Saint Odo of Cluny (133)
- Benedictine monk Otloh of St. Emmeram (146)
- Petrus Comestor (198)
- Peter Tudebode (155)
- Uncanonized Saint Peter the Venerable, abbot of Cluny (189)
- Abbot Regino of Prüm (132)
- Prior Richard of St. Victor (196)
- Cistercian Abbot Robert of Molesme (157)
- Robert the Monk (155)
- Monk Rufinus of Aquileia, translator (21)
- Abbot Suger of Saint-Denis (186)
- Orderic Vitalis (188)
- Monk William of Malmesbury, historian (179)

=== Others ===
Including those not yet categorized

- Peter Abelard (178)
- Adam of Bremen (146)
- Aimoin (139)
- Alain de Lille (210)
- Alcuin (100–101)
- Arnobius (5)
- Aurelius Prudentius Clemens (60)
- Bede (90–95)
- Boethius (63–64)
- Saint Boniface (89)
- Bruno of Chartreuse (152–153)
- Cassiodorus (69–70)
- Cyprian (3–4)
- False Decretals (56)
- Dunstan (137)
- Einhard (104)
- Eusebius of Vercelli (12)
- Flodoard (135)
- Fulbert of Chartres (141)
- Fulcher of Chartres (155)
- Gaius Marius Victorinus (8)
- Gottschalk (121)
- Gratian (187)
- Guibert of Nogent (156)
- Helgaud (141)
- Helinand of Froidmont (212)
- Hermannus Contractus (also called Hermann of Reichenau or Hermannus Augiensis)(143)
- Hildegard of Bingen (197)
- Hincmar (125–126)
- Hroswitha of Gandersheim (137)
- Pseudo-Isidore (130)
- Saint Jerome (22–30)
- Johannes Scotus Eriugena (122)
- Lactantius (6–7)
- Lucifer Calaritanus (13)
- Magnus Felix Ennodius, Latin rhetorician and poet (63)
- Marcus Minucius Felix (3)
- Marianus Scotus (147)
- Novatian (3)
- Orosius (31)
- Pelagius (21)
- Peter of Blois, French poet and diplomat (207)
- Rabanus Maurus (107–112)
- Radbertus (120)
- Ratramnus (121)
- Raymond of Aguilers (155)
- Saint Prosper of Aquitaine (51)
- Salvian (53)
- Symmachus (18)
- Saint Sulpicius Severus (20)
- Tertullian (volumes 1–2)
- Theodulf (105)
- Venantius Fortunatus (88)
- Saint Vincent of Lérins (50)
- Walafrid Strabo (113–114)
- Walter of Châtillon (209)
- Walter the Chancellor (155)

== See also ==
- Patrologia Graeca
- Patrologia Orientalis
- Corpus Scriptorum Ecclesiasticorum Latinorum
- Corpus Christianorum
