= Coloniensis =

Coloniensis is a Latin adjective meaning "of Cologne". It occurs in many names:

- Adam Teuto, called Coloniensis
- Albertus Coloniensis
- Annales sancti Panthaleonis Coloniensis maximi
- Archidioecesis Coloniensis
- Argentodites coloniensis
- Cappella Coloniensis
- Chronica regia Coloniensis
- Codex Manichaicus Coloniensis
- Wolbero Coloniensis
