= Mummolus of Fleury =

Saint Mummolus Abbot of Fleury
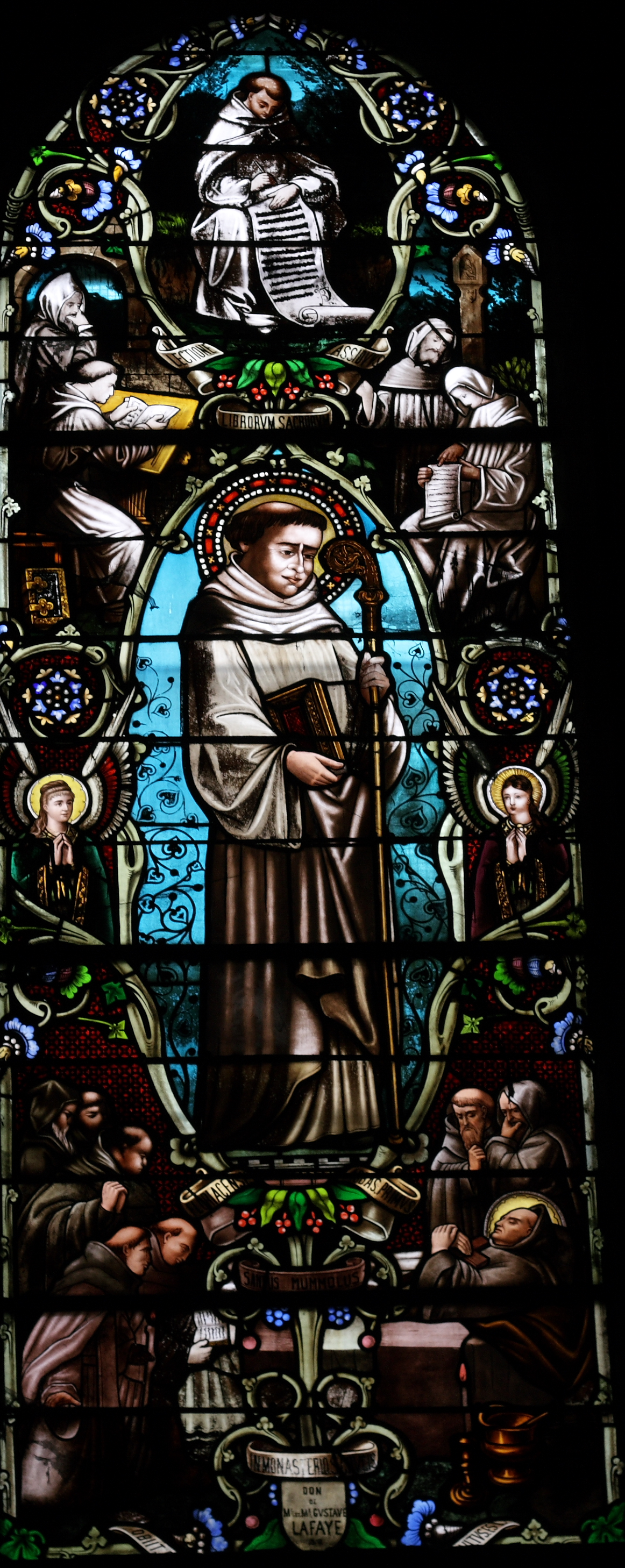
- Stained glass in the Église Sainte-Croix de Bordeaux representing Mummolus
- Died: 663
- Feast: 18 November

Mummolus (sometimes Mommolin or Mommole) was the second abbot of Fleury Abbey at Saint-Benoît-sur-Loire for 30 years between September 632 and January 663.

== Life ==
Fleury Abbey was founded by Leodebod, Abbot of Saint-Agnan of Orléans, in the 7th century. Mummolus became its second or third abbot.

In 660 (Note: Other sources date the reception of Saint Benedict's relics to 11 July 703.) Mummolus sent an expedition to transfer the remains of Benedict of Nursia and his sister Scholastica from the Territorial Abbey of Monte Cassino (now in Italy) to the Abbey of Fleury (now in France). Mummolus sent one of the monks to Monte Cassino, where the monastery had been ruined by the Lombards, with the mission of stealing the saints' relics from their grave in the church. The monk, who was accompanied by some monks from the monastery of Mans, succeeded in the mission. The relics of Scholastica were given to Mans and those of Benedict to Fleury Abbey.

Adrevald of Fleury gives a more complete account. He says a monk from Fleury named Aigulphus had a dream in which he learned that the tombs of the two saints had been ruined. Mummolus gave him permission to attempt to retrieve their relics, and he was joined by some monks from Le Mans. Miraculous aid led them to the tomb at Monte Cassino and helped them smuggle the bodies to Fleury. A new monastery was founded in Le Mans for the relics of Scholastica. In Fleury, Mummolus planned to bury Benedict in the church of Saint Peter, but a miraculous shaft of light came from the smaller church of the Virgin Mary, which was taken as a sign that the relics should be placed there.

The name of Saint-Benoît-sur-Loire (Saint Benedict on the Loire) refers to this alleged transfer. The possession of the relics of the founder of the Benedictine Order brought great prestige to the monastery, and attracted many pilgrims who were inspired by miracles performed through the saint to make donations to the monastery. The monks of Monte Cassino dispute this story, and the shrine of Saint Benedict in Monte Cassino is still a place of pilgrimage for Benedict's followers.

At the end of his life Mummolus made the pilgrimage to Santiago de Compostela. Exhausted, he returned to Béarn then crossed the Landes de Gascogne. There, he stopped at Aureilhan, where he made a spring of water appear. On his arrival in Bordeaux in 679 he was quickly welcomed by the Benedictines of the Sainte-Croix Abbey. There he acquired a reputation for holiness before dying, shortly after. The people of Bordeaux came in large numbers to his funeral and subsequently attributed to him all the benefits they received.

== Iconography ==
The iconography of this saint is rare. One example is a painting at the Sainte-Croix abbey in Bordeaux by the French painter Guillaume Cureau: Saint Mommolin healing a possessed person dated 1647.

== Sources ==
- "An Abbot of the Tenth Century", The Month and Catholic Review, I (XX), London: Simpkin, Marshall, and Company, January–April 1874
- Église Sainte Ruffine d'Aureilhan, Présentation du saint dans le porche (in French)
- Head, Thomas (2005), Hagiography and the Cult of Saints: The Diocese of Orléans, 800-1200, Cambridge University Press, ISBN 0521365007
- Laporte, J. (1969), "L'Abbaye de Fleury", Dictionnaire d'histoire et de géographie ecclésiastiques (in French), vol. XVII, Paris: éditions Letouzey & Ané
- Mostert, Marco (1987), The Political Theology of Abbo of Fleury: A Study of the Ideas about Society and Law of the Tenth-century Monastic Reform Movement, Uitgeverij Verloren, ISBN 9065502092
- Watkins, Basil (November 19, 2015), "Mummolus (Mommolus, Mommolenus)", The Book of Saints: A Comprehensive Biographical Dictionary, Bloomsbury Publishing, ISBN 9780567664150
