= Ordo Rachelis =

Medieval play

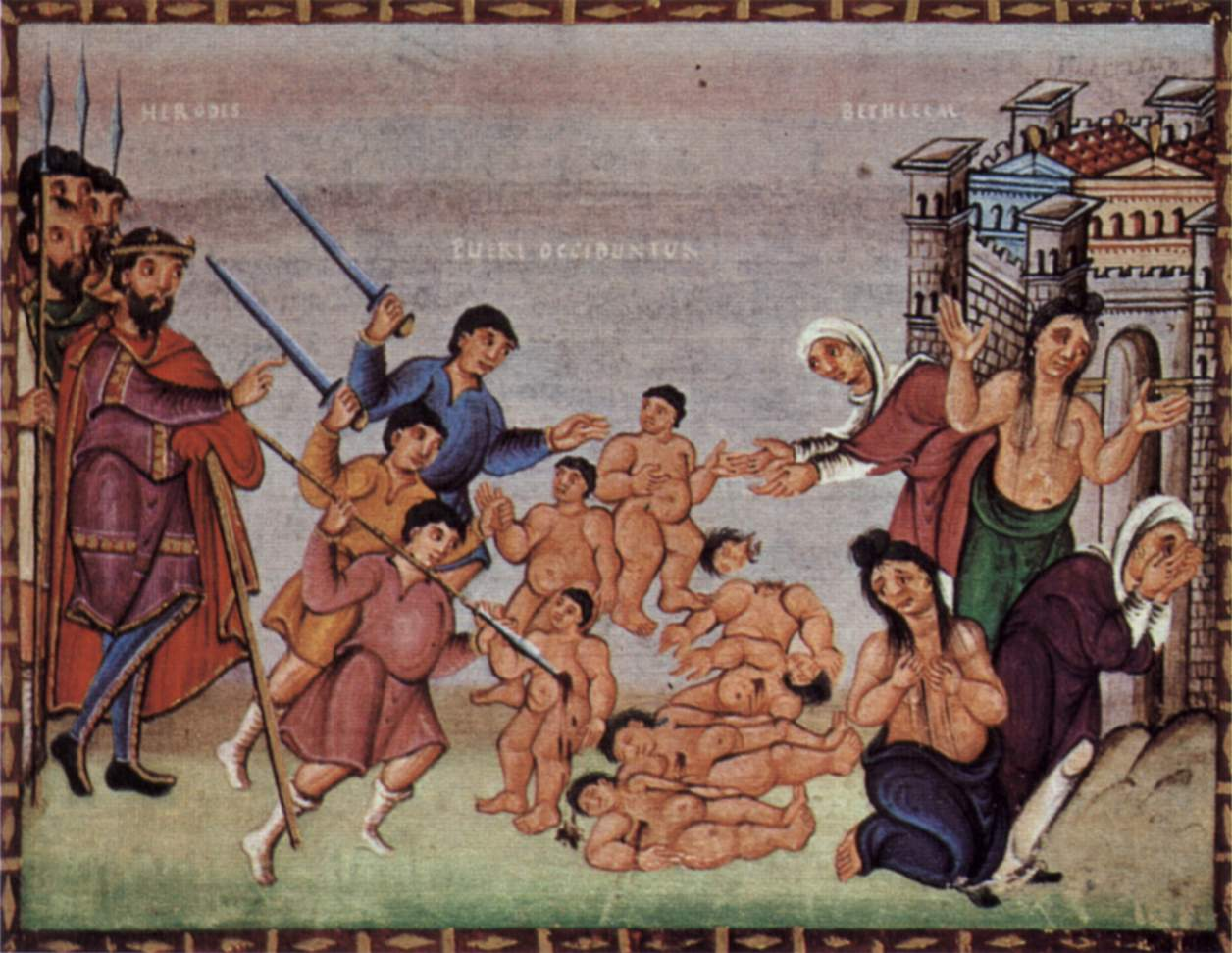
Massacre of the Innocents from the late 10th-century Codex Egberti

The Ordo Rachelis (Play of Rachel), Interfectio Puerorum (Murder of the Children), or Ludus Innocentium (Play of the Innocents) is a medieval dramatic tradition consisting in four plays and based on the Massacre of the Innocents, an event recorded in the Gospel of Matthew, and on the prophecy recorded in the Book of Jeremiah: "A voice was heard in Ramah, lamentation, and bitter weeping; Rahel weeping for her children refused to be comforted for her children, because they were not" (31:15, KJV). The prophecy, which Matthew believed to be fulfilled when Herod the Great ordered the slaughter of all boys under two in Bethlehem, looks backwards to Rachel, the matriarch of the Hebrews, and towards her lamentation over the death of her children, the Hebrew children, in the massacre.

The Ordo Rachelis plays were probably performed as part of the liturgy for Innocents Day (28 December).

== Texts and origins ==
The first modern critical edition of the Rachel plays was made by Karl Young in 1919. Young believed the plays developed from dramatic kernels in the Epiphany plays of the ninth and tenth centuries into full dramatic treatments of their own in the eleventh and twelfth. The four extensive treatments which Young classified as ordines Rachelis differ considerably. There are the Lamentatio Rachelis from Saint-Martial at Limoges (eleventh century), a lengthy part of an Epiphany play from Laon (twelfth century), a play from Freising (late eleventh century), and another one from Fleury (thirteenth century). Only the last two can be regarded as "separate dramatic unit[s]". In both of them the fuga in Egyptum and the pastores themes have been incorporated, and the Fleury play contains the only extant medieval dramatic representation of the return from Egypt. Chambers has gone so far as to suggest a coalescing of all the Epiphany themes in the Fleury ordo and of a merging of the Rachel and Herod (Herodes) themes in the Freising.

The late eleventh-century manuscript of the Limoges ordo is now lat. 1139 in the Bibliothèque nationale de France, Paris, which contains many liturgical pieces, including the play Sponsus. The Fleury version is preserved in the famous Fleury Playbook, an important eleventh-century compilation of liturgical drama.

As to the origins of the tradition Karl Young concluded, like Heinrich Anz before him (Die lateinischen Magierspiele, 1905), that it was initially an independent trope at Limoges and then appended to the Officium stellae at Laon, representing a French tradition. This tradition was merged with a German one that arose at Freising at Fleury, though the ecclesiastical affairs that brought about this transmission (from Laon, Limoges, and Freising to Fleury) are unknown. Young differs from Anz in that the latter thought the Freising text also developed from the Limoges original. An older theory of origins was put forth by William Meyer (Fragmenta Burana, 1901). He hypothesised that a south German original, large and complex, disintegrated into a Freising play that was largely a whittled-down copy and three divergent French plays that were influenced by the French liturgy.

Peter Dronke believes it was to the dialogic poem Quid tu, virgo by Notker the Stammerer, written probably in the 860s, that the eleventh-century dramatists were responding with their Rachel sequences.

== Plot and drama ==
The Rachel of the play is symbolically every Hebrew mother who lost her child to the massacre. In the Freising version, she opens the action by singing a planctus over her children's bodies before a consolatrix (female comforter) arrives to soothe her spirit. In the Fleury version, she sings a series of four plancti before two consolatrices come out to catch her as she faints. The consolatrices fail to comfort her, but lead her away. In both versions they sing the final lines. In the Fleury version the drama began with a procession of young boys per monasterium (down the aisle of the church's nave) and a lamb bearing a cross appears running "to and fro" (huc et illuc).

Then the action shifts to Herod receiving his sceptre and Saint Joseph at the manger receiving a message from Gabriel to flee to Egypt. Joseph and the holy family exit secretly while Herod attempts suicide as news is brought that the Magi avoided telling him the Christ child's location. After he regains his composure, he orders the massacre. The lamb is then led off stage and the massacre begins, despite the pleas of the mothers and the children to the angels above. After the Rachel scenes, an angel conducts the children to the choir and a dumb show shows Herod being succeeded as king by Archelaus before the holy family returns from Egypt. The entire Fleury play ends with a singing of the Te Deum.
