= Sermones (Pseudo)-Bonifatii =

The Sermones (Pseudo)-Bonifatii are a collection of eighth- and ninth-century sermons attributed to Saint Boniface. The collection contains 15 sermons and was probably first assembled in the ninth century, but may contain older sermons. Scholars have expressed the possibility that they are indeed Boniface's, but this is by no means generally accepted.

From early in their history, however, they were associated with Boniface, and their intended audience appears to be like the newly initiated Christians he may have preached too. They were known in Mainz and its surroundings and in Bavaria, areas where Boniface was active.

Most of the sermons discuss elementary tenets of Christianity, such as the trinity; particular attention is paid to the Sermon on the Mount. The sermons were published in the Patrologia Latina (vol. 89, cols 843-872). The oldest manuscript is Bibliotheca Apostolica Vaticana Pal. lat. 212 (late eighth century).

== Editions ==
- Jelsma, Auke (2003). Het Leven als Leerschool: Preken van Bonifatius. Laren: Esplanade. ISBN 90-808350-1-3.
