= Saint Mommolin =

Saint Mommolin may refer to

- Mommolin of Fleury, abbot of Fleury Abbey between September 632 and January 663
- Mommolin of Noyon died c. 686), Bishop of Noyon-Tournai in Belgium
