= Cureau =

Cureau if a French surname. It may refer to

- Guillaume Cureau (c. 1595–1648), French painter.
- Marin Cureau de la Chambre 1594–1669), French physician and philosopher
- Pierre Cureau de La Chambre (1640–1693), French churchman
- Cureau, minor planet named after Marin Cureau de la Chambre
