= Rusticus =

Rusticus is a Latin adjective meaning "rural, simple, rough or clownish" and can refer to:

== Animals ==
- a synonym of the butterfly genus Plebejus

== People ==
=== Saints and martyrs ===
- Saint Rusticus of Narbonne (died c. 461)
- Saint Rusticus (Archbishop of Lyon) (c. 455–501)
- One of the martyred companions of Saint Denis (3rd century)
- Martyr of Verona (died c. 290): see Firmus and Rusticus

=== Other people ===
- Fabius Rusticus, 1st-century historian of ancient Rome
- Arulenus Rusticus, (c. 35–93 AD) consul executed by Domitian
- Flavius Rusticus Helpidius, 5th-century Latin poet
- Junius Rusticus, 2nd-century Stoic philosopher, consul, and friend of Marcus Aurelius
