= Eutropius of Valencia =

Spanish bishop

Eutropius of Valencia (died circa 610) was a Spanish bishop. It was not till 589 that he became Bishop of Valencia, and his death cannot be set down earlier than 610. These are the dates found in Enrique Florez. Nothing is known of his work during his episcopacy. Historians have usually called him saint, but it does not appear that he was ever honoured by a liturgical tradition.

== Life ==
He was originally a monk in the Monasterium Servitanum, generally believed to have been situated in the province of Valencia, Spain. It was founded some time in the sixth century by the monk Donatus who had been driven from Roman Africa during one of the Vandal persecutions. The rule he introduced must have been based on that in use among the African monks, which has caused the members of this community to be connected with the Augustinians, without, however, sufficient warrant. The Monasterium Servitanum is known only through the references of St. Isidore and St. Ildephonsus to its founder and one of his disciples, Eutropius, who succeeded as abbot.

== Works ==
Eutropius is known as the author of three letters, one to Licinian, Bishop of Cartagena, and two to Peter, Bishop of Iturbica. In the first, which has been lost, he inquires the reason for anointing baptized children with holy chrism. This letter is known through St. Isidore. The same saint mentions a letter to Bishop Peter, the text of which has been preserved, which he says every monk should read. The title is "De destructione monachorum et ruina monasteriorum". In response to a suggestion of some candidates for his monastery, he points out that the number of monks is a small matter compared with their earnestness. He may be criticized for his severity in enforcing the rule and in reprimanding the guilty, but he can easily justify himself, as his whole care consists in applying the rules the founders of the monastery laid down. And thus the reproaches made against him fall back on their authors. In any case he will not swerve from his course; he is indifferent to the criticisms of men. He cannot allow the faults of the monks to go unchecked. The Scriptures and the Fathers agree that correction is one of the first duties of him who is charged with the guidance of others, and negligence on this head would only lead to serious irregularities.

The second letter to Bishop Peter touches on the seven deadly sins. Like Cassian, Eutropius enumerates eight: gluttony, lust, covetousness, anger, sadness, faint-heartedness, vanity, and pride. He analyzes them, traces the links that unite them, and emphasizes their results. A Christian should resist these enemies with all his strength, persuaded that of himself he cannot be victorious, but that he needs the help of God. As Eutropius develops his thought the teaching of Cassian becomes more and more evident. Eutropius was still at the monastery when he wrote these letters. His letters are to be found in Migne, Patrologia Latina, LXXX, 9-20.
