= Maurice de Sully =

Medieval churchman (died 1196)

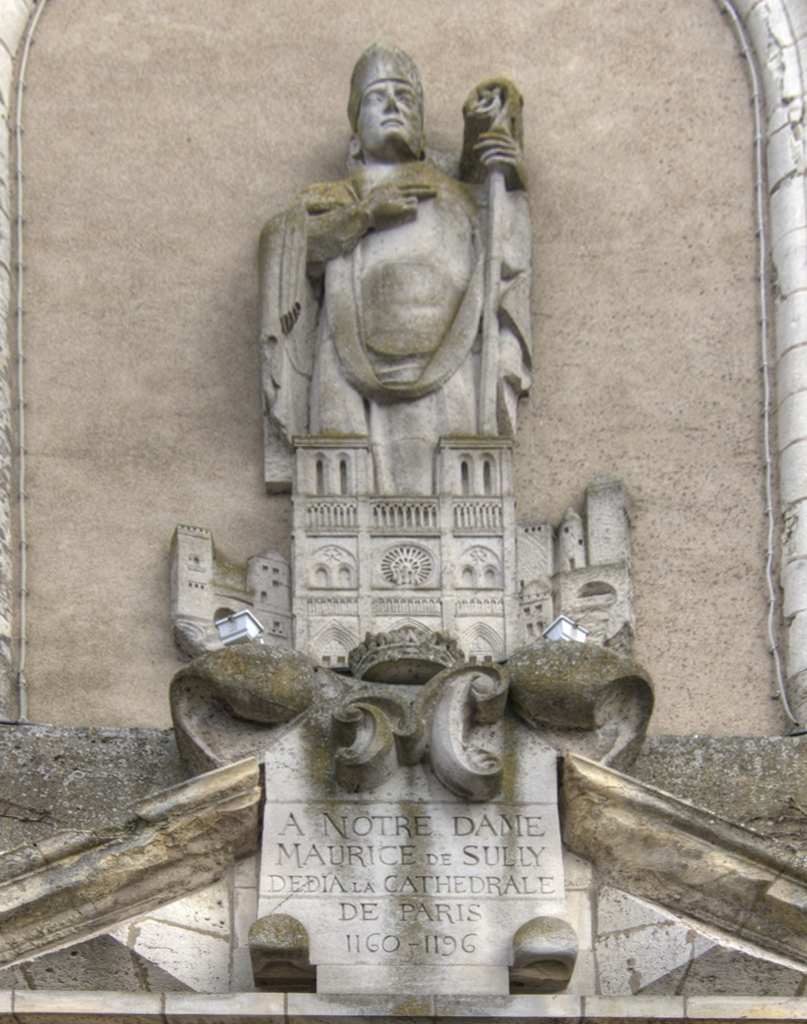
de Sully memorial on Collégiale Saint-Ythier church in Sully-sur-Loire, France; Notre-Dame de Paris is depicted at the bishop's feet

Maurice de Sully (pronounced [mɔʁis də syli]; died 11 September 1196) was Bishop of Paris from 1160 until his retirement in 1196. He was responsible for the construction of the Cathedral of Notre-Dame.

== Biography ==
He was born to poor parents at Sully-sur-Loire (Soliacum), near Orléans, at the beginning of the twelfth century. He came to Paris towards 1140 and studied for the ecclesiastical state. He soon became known as an able professor of theology and an eloquent preacher. It has been frequently asserted, but without sufficient proof, that he was a canon of Bourges. In 1159, he was mentioned as the Archdeacon of Paris, and on 12 October 1160, largely through the influence of Louis VII, he was elected to succeed Peter Lombard in the episcopal see of that city.

The present Cathedral of Notre-Dame stands as a monument to his episcopal administration. Its construction was begun and almost entirely completed under him. In 1163, Pope Alexander III laid the cornerstone of the magnificent edifice, and in 1185 the Patriarch of Jerusalem, Heraclius, officiated in the completed sanctuary. He also converted the synagogue that stood on the site of the now Église de la Madeleine when it was seized by Philip II of France from the Jews of Paris in 1182, and duly consecrated it as a church dedicated to Mary Magdalene. Maurice de Sully also rebuilt the episcopal palace in which the nobility and clergy met in 1179 at the coronation of Philip Augustus as joint ruler with his father Louis VII. He enjoyed in a high degree the confidence of both rulers, accompanied Louis to his meeting with Frederick Barbarossa at Saint-Jean-de-Losne in 1162, and was one of the guardians of the royal treasury during the Third Crusade (1190).

In the controversy between Thomas Becket and Henry II of England, he energetically defended the former and, in three letters still extant, pleaded his cause with Alexander III. He forbade the celebration of the feast of the Immaculate Conception in his diocese, but is said to have strongly supported by appeals to the Bible (Job, xix, 25-27) the doctrine of the resurrection of bodies, against some sceptical noblemen. Although he retained the administration of his diocese, he retired, late in life, to the Abbey of Saint Victor, Paris, where he died.

== Works ==
Maurice de Sully is the author of a treatise on the Canon of the Mass, preserved in manuscript at Bourges. Numerous sermons, some in Latin, others in vernacular, are also attributed to him. Those written in the Latin tongue were not directly destined for the people, but rather for the use and study of the clergy. The French sermons do not seem to be in their present form the original work of Maurice de Sully; they are more commonly considered as reproductions made by ecclesiastics from his Latin collection. No critical edition of these sermons has yet been published; his three letters to Alexander III are printed in P. L., CC, 1419–22, as are also some of his official documents (CCV, 897-914).

== Bibliography ==
- Pascal Tonazzi, Florilège de Notre-Dame de Paris (anthologie), Editions Arléa, Paris, 2007, ISBN 2-86959-795-9
- Jean Longère, Maurice de Sully (c. 1120–1196), Encyclopedia of the Middle Ages, ISBN 9780227679319
