= Fleury Playbook =

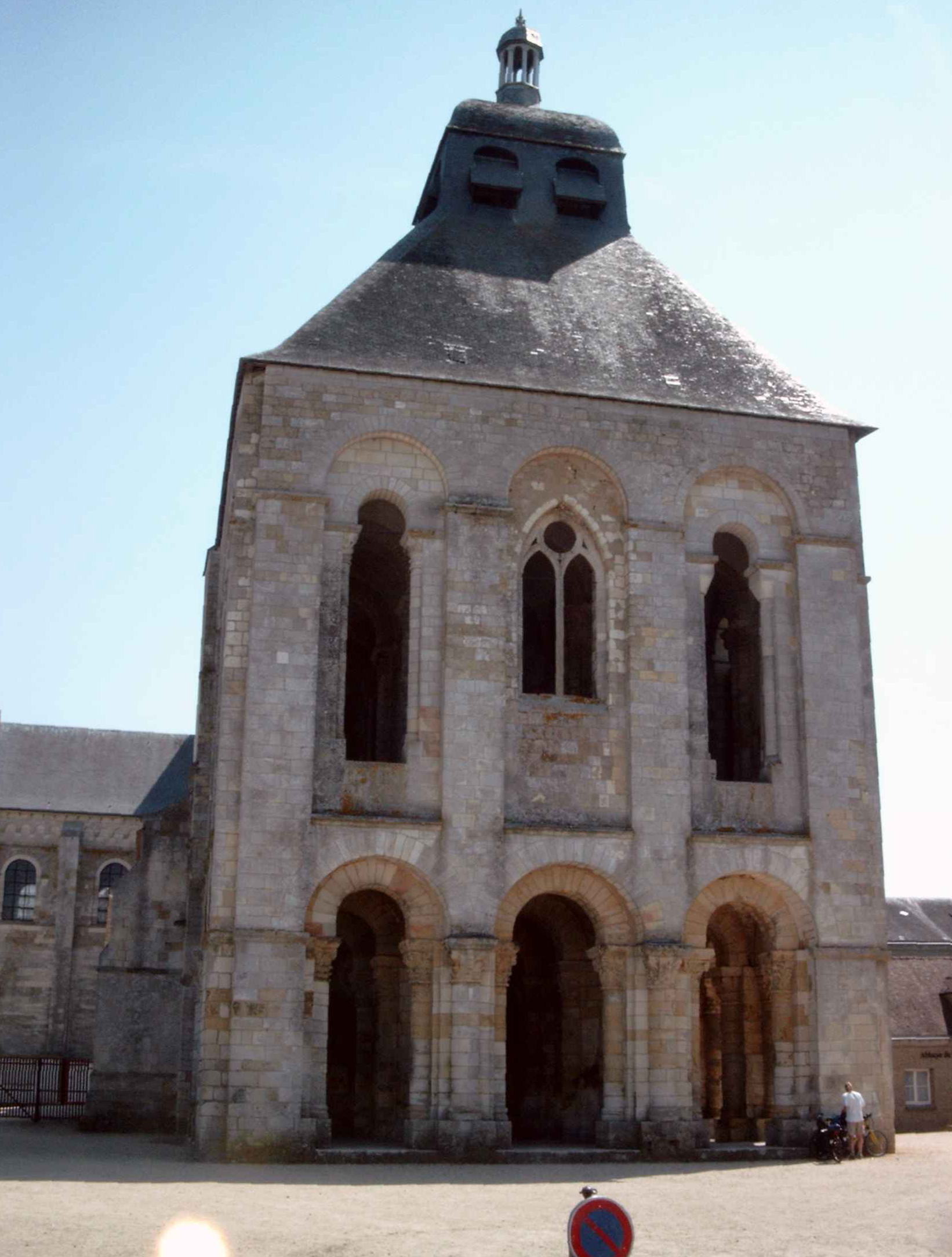
Abbaye Saint Benoît de Fleury, the supposed origin of the book.

The Fleury Playbook (French: Livre de Jeux de Fleury — Orléans, Bibliothèque Municipale MS. 201) is a medieval collection of Latin biblical dramas dating from around 1200. It was included in a composite volume of sermons, biblical texts, liturgical dramas, and hymns that was bound and kept at the library of Abbaye Saint Benoît de Fleury, a Benedictine monastery at Saint-Benoît-sur-Loire, France, until after the French Revolution and is now housed in the Bibliothèque de la Ville (Municipal Library) at Orléans, France. The works in the playbook are told in a musical style similar to that of plainsong. The origin of the book is unknown, but it is possible that it was written by multiple authors. The playbook consists of a total of 10 works, occupying pages 176–243 of the manuscript.

== Origin ==
The playbook was compiled in the late 12th century. Although it is widely accepted that the Fleury Playbook was created in the Fleury Abbey, the neumes in the musical scores are not similar to those found there, nor was the Abbey known for any achievements in drama prior to the Fleury Playbook, both of which suggest that the book may have been bound elsewhere. However, the manuscript was copied and housed in the abbey's scriptorium, and may have served as an early example of a liturgical drama.

== Context ==
The plays are both liturgical and non-liturgical (specifically those pertaining to St. Nicholas), and may be performed both monastically and non-monastically, as the text does not specify. As each drama appears to correspond with different dates of the liturgical year, it is likely that main purpose of the playbook is not liturgical. The plays are meant to be performed, as evidenced by their structure, staging, and effects. Overall, the plays cover both Old Testament and New Testament themes such as the Ten Commandments and conversion.

== Plays ==
The ten works in the Fleury Playbook are written in the following order:

- Miracles of Saint Nicholas
  - Tres Filiae (The Three Daughters)
  - Tres Clerici (The Three Clerks)
  - Iconia Sancti Nicholai (The Image of Saint Nicholas)
  - Filius Getronis, (The Son of Getron — the most popular of those relating to Saint Nicholas)
- Christmas plays
  - Ordo ad Representandum Herodem (The Service for Representing Herod — about the Nativity)
  - Interfectio Puerorum (The Massacre of the Innocents)
- Easter plays:
  - Visitatio Sepulcri (The Resurrection of Jesus)
  - Peregrinus (The Pilgrim; about the Supper at Emmaus)
- Conversion and rebirth
  - Conversio Sancti Pauli (The Conversion of Saint Paul)
  - Resuscitatio Lazari (The Raising of Lazarus)
