= Zacharias Chrysopolitanus =

12th-century Greek biblical scholar

Zacharias Chrysopolitanus (died c. 1155), also known as Zachary of Besançon, was a biblical scholar of the Premonstratensian Order from Besançon (Chrysopolis). He was headmaster of the cathedral school at Besançon and then joined the Abbey of Saint Martin in Laon, where he concentrated on his writing. In about 1140 or 1145, he published a Gospel harmony with a grammatical and etymological explanation of the Greek, Hebrew, and some Latin words found in the text, under the title Unum ex quattuor, sive de concordia evangelistarum (printed in Migne's Patrologia Latina 186:11-620).

The work, divided into 181 chapters, is introduced by three prefaces: the first shows the relation of the Gospel to the Jewish Law, to philosophy, and to the symbols of the Evangelists; the second describes the Evangelists and their view of the mission of Christ; the third enumerates the authors he used. Zacharias attributes the work itself to Ammonius of Alexandria; either way, it is based on Tatian's Diatesseron. He differs in one notable exception from Ammonius, where he assumes that Christ made another journey to Samaria after his triumphant journey into Jerusalem. His commentary relies on the Latin Fathers, including Ambrose, Augustine, and Jerome. Among the teachers of the Middle Ages, he employs mostly Bede, Alcuin, and Remigius of Auxerre.
