= Aimoin of Fleury =

French monk and chronicler (c. 960 – c. 1010)

Aimoin of Fleury (Latin: Aimoinus (Annonius; Aemonius) Floriacensis; c. 960 – c. 1010) was a medieval French monk and chronicler active in the late 10th and early 11th centuries. He was born at Villefranche-de-Longchat, in Southwestern France, about 960. Early in his life he entered the monastery of Fleury, where he became a monk and then passed the greater part of his life. Between c. 980 and 985 Aimoin wrote about Saint Benedict in the Abbey of Fleury-sur-Loire.

His chief work is the Historia Francorum, or Libri V. de Gestis Francorum, which deals with the history of the Franks from the earliest times to 653, and was continued by other writers until the middle of the 12th century. It was much in vogue during the Middle Ages, but its historical value is now regarded as slight. Its early printed edition was prepared by a French humanist Guillaume Parvy (Latin: Guilielmus Parvus, 1470-1536) and published in 1514 by Parisian printers Jean Petit (Latin: Johannes Parvus) and Jodocus Badius (Latin: Iodocus Badius Ascensius), while later editions were published on several occasions, including the 1853 edition in Patrologiae cursus completus (tome 139).

In 1004 Aimoin also wrote Vita Abbonis, abbatis Floriacensis, the last of a series of lives of the abbots of Fleury, all of which, except the life of Abbo, have been lost. This was published by J. Mabillon in the Acta sanctorum ordinis sancti Benedicti (Paris, 1668–1701).

Aimoin's third work was the composition of books ii and iii of the Miracula sancti Benedicti, the first book of which was written by another monk of Fleury named Adrevald (c. 818 – 878). This also appears in the Acta sanctorum.

== Sources ==
- Parvus, Guilielmus, ed. (1514). Annonij monachi Benedictini: De Regum procerumque Francorum origine gestisque clarissimis. Parisii: Ioannes Parvus & Iodocus Badius Ascensius.
- Migne, Jacobus Paulus, ed. (1853). "Aimoini Historiae Francorum libri quatuor". Patrologiae cursus completus. Vol. 139. Lutetiae Parisiorum: Migne. pp. 627–802.
