= Renier of Saint-Laurent =

Renier of Saint-Laurent (died 1188) was a twelfth-century Benedictine monk of Saint-Laurent Abbey, Liège. He is known as a writer of theological and exegetical works, controversial and historical works, and numerous biographical and hagiographical works. Works by him are in Patrologia Latina and Monumenta Germaniae Historica.

The Triumphale Bulonicum is a chronicle and commemorates the siege of Bouillon Castle by Albero, prince-bishop of Liège, 17 August to 22 September 1141. It is based on eye-witness accounts.
