= Guillaume Cureau =

French painter

- Born: c. 1595; La Rochefoucauld, Charente, France
- Died: 23 February 1648 (aged 52–53); Bordeaux, France
- Occupation: Painter

Guillaume Cureau (c. 1595 – 23 February 1648) was a French painter.

== Life ==
Guillaume Cureau was born in La Rochefoucauld, Charente around 1595. In 1620 in Angoulême, then in 1622 in Bordeaux, parish of Saint-Éloi, Cureau apprenticed with the painter Jos(eph) Roy. On Roy's death he became a painter at the Hôtel de Ville of Bordeaux, one of whose duties was to paint portraits of jurats and mayors. In 1625 he demanded payment for the portraits of Lacroix, Marot (or Maron), Vignoles, de Chimbaud, Dupin de Tortaty, Constant, Fouques and Bordenabe. From 1633 to 1635 he painted the vaults of the chapel of the Château de Cadillac. Cureau died on 23 February 1648 in Bordeaux, France. (Note: Between the articles on Cureau by Gustave Brunet et de Monsieur Bertrand there are several differences: the internet version of Monsieur Bertrand's text dates the death of Curreau's master, spelled Jas-du-Roy, from 1620 while in his text he tells us that Curreau was his apprentice from 1622 to 1624. Several proper names are also modified: Brunet writes Vignoles, de Chimbaud, Dupin, de Tortaty, Constant, Fouques; Bertand (or the modern transcriptionist) writes Vîgnolles de Chambaud, Dupin de Torlaty, Constant de Pouques. We prefer the text of Gustave Brunet.)

The portraits of jurats and mayors were given to their families after the death or the termination of the magistrate's function. There remains in the possession of the Town Hall today, after the revolutionary auctions and the burning of the Town Hall, only one portrait: that of Mullet, Lord of La Tour.

== Work ==
Only a few of Cureau's works are known today.

- Messire de Mullet, oil on canvas, 69 by 57 centimetres (27 by 22 in), Bordeaux, Museum of Decorative Arts, deposit of the Museum of Fine Arts. Purchased by the municipality in 1856.

In 1646 an altarpiece was commissioned by the Bordeaux town hall from the Bordeaux carpenter Raymond Caussade, it included the following two paintings.

- Saint Mommolin soothing a lunatic, Church of the Holy Cross, Bordeaux, oil on canvas, 2.23 by 1.67 metres (7 ft 4 in by 5 ft 6 in), 1647 this painting, restored in 1988 was later slashed in the lower part.
- Saint Maur curing an invalid, Church of the Holy Cross, Bordeaux, oil on canvas, 2.41 by 1.83 metres (7 ft 11 in by 6 ft 0 in)

== Bibliography ==
- Bertrand, directeur d'école à La Rochefoucauld (February 1924), "Le Peintre Guillaume Cureau", Études Locales (in French), 4e année (38)
- Braquehaye, Charles (1898), Les peintres de l'Hôtel de Ville de Bordeaux et des entrées royales depuis 1525 (in French), Paris-Bordeaux, p. 119
- Brunet, Gustave (1852–1853), Notes sur les peintres de la mairie de Bordeaux (Archives de l'art français, recueil de documents inédits relatifs à l'histoire de l'art en France) (in French), vol. 2, Ph. de Chennevières Available on Google Books under the title Nouvelles recherches sur la vie et les ouvrages d'Eustache Le Sueur.
- Marionneau, Charles (1861), Description des œuvres d'art qui décorent les édifices publics de la ville de Bordeaux (in French) The painting of Saint Mommolin, unidentified, is described at length.
