= Andrew of Fleury =

Andrew of Fleury was a Christian monk and contemporary historian of the Peace and Truce of God movements.

A Benedictine at Fleury Abbey, Andrew's chief work was Miracula sancti Benedicti ("The Miracles of Saint Benedict"), written c.1043. He records that in 1038 Aimon, Archbishop of Bourges, forced his suffragans to swear an oath to fight the enemies of the church, and made every male fifteen years old or older swear the same oath to his diocesan. A "peace army", composed mainly of clerics and peasants, was formed and much bloodshed followed. Andrew disapproves of Aimon's actions, arguing that the "peace army" soon became blinded by ambition.

Andrew visited Catalonia on at least one occasion. He is the most detailed and accurate source for the Battle of Torà in 1003. He records the presence, on the Christian side, of four counts: Raymond Borell of Barcelona, Bernard I of Besalú, Wifred II of Cerdagne, and Ermengol I of Urgell. He is in error, however, when he records that the Caliph of Córdoba, Hisham II, died in the encounter, which is probably a local legend. The actual leader of the Muslim army was Abdelmelik, the son of hajib Almanzor. Andrew reports the battle in terms as if describing a holy war. The Muslims, whose numbers he puts at 17 000, are "new Philistines", the Christians are aided by the saints Peter and Michael and the Virgin Mary, who announces the Christian victory as far away as Monte Sant'Angelo. Despite the theme of religious warfare, Spanish historians have not picked up on Andrew's account.

Andrew also wrote a Vita Gauzlini ("Life of Gauzlin") about the former abbot of his house, Gauzlin. He reports that Gauzlin mistakenly believed that the "heretics of Orléans" nuptias non prohibeo, secunda matrimonio non dampno ("they do not prohibit weddings, according to which they do not damn marriage"); Andrew more accurately reports that nuptias con benedictione non debere fieri, sed accipiat quiscumque qualiter voluerit ("weddings with a blessing they forbid to be made, rather they consider as indebted whomever wills it"). Andrew also includes a copy of the letter Gauzlin addressed to Robert II of France in 1022, after the king asked him why blood had been seen to fall from the sky. He also records the poem to which the cycle of Apocalyptic frescoes at Fleury, commissioned by Gauzlin, corresponds.

== Bibliography ==
- Head, Thomas (1987). "Andrew of Fleury and the Peace League of Bourges". Essays on the Peace of God: The Church and the People in Eleventh-Century France. Historical Reflections. 14/3. Thomas Head and Richard Landes, edd. (Waterloo, ON: Department of History, University of Waterloo). 513–529.
