= Saint-Benoît-sur-Loire =

- Commune
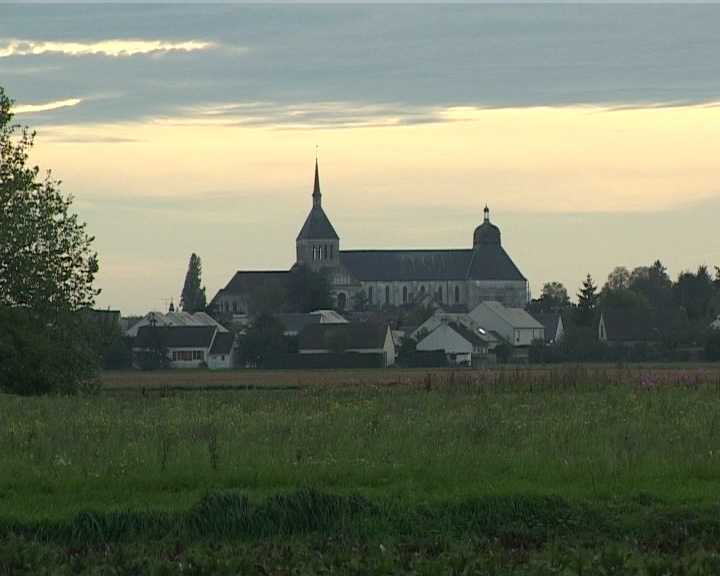
- Abbey

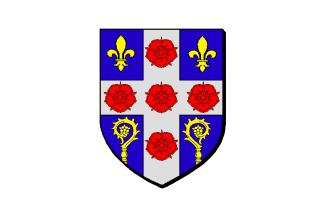
- Flag Coat of arms
- Location of Saint-Benoît-sur-Loire
- Location within France Location within Centre-Val de Loire
- Coordinates: 47°48′37″N 2°18′24″E
- Country: France
- Region: Centre-Val de Loire
- Department: Loiret
- Arrondissement: Orléans
- Canton: Sully-sur-Loire
- Intercommunality: Val de Sully

Government
  - Mayor (2020–2026): Gilles Burgevin
- Area^{1}: 18.27 km^{2} (7.05 sq mi)
- Highest elevation: 115 m (377 ft)
- Lowest elevation: 105 m (344 ft)
- Population (2023): 1,982
  - Density: 108.5/km^{2} (281.0/sq mi)
- Time zone: UTC+01:00 (CET)
  - Summer (DST): UTC+02:00 (CEST)
- INSEE/Postal code: 45270 /45730
- ^{1} French Land Register data, which excludes lakes, ponds, glaciers > 1 km^{2} (0.386 sq mi or 247 acres) and river estuaries.

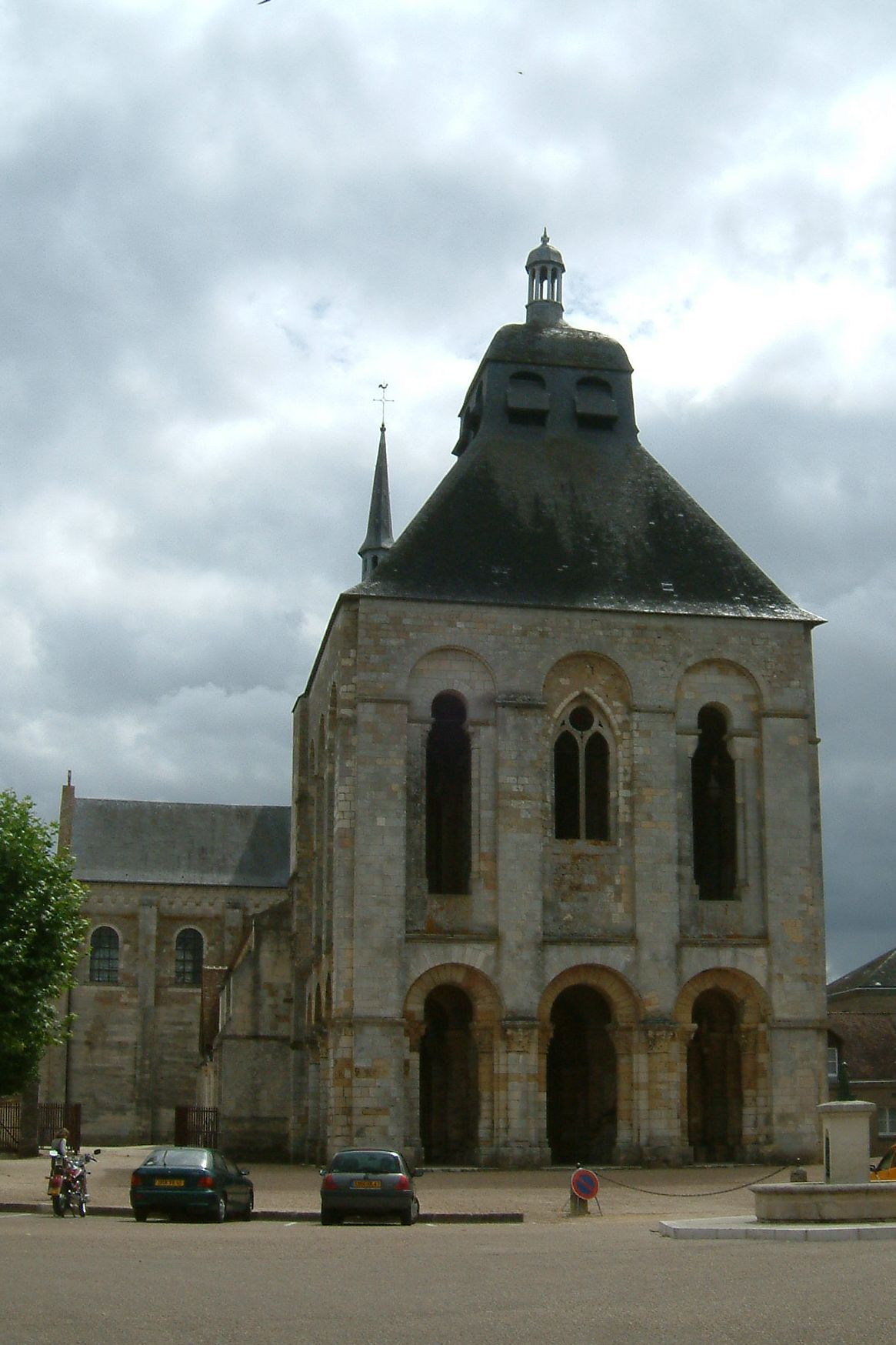
Saint Benedict Abbey

Saint-Benoît-sur-Loire (French pronunciation: [sɛ̃ bənwa syʁ lwaʁ], literally Saint-Benoît on Loire) is a commune in the Loiret department in north-central France.

== Monastery ==
This town grew up around Fleury Abbey, also known as the Abbaye de Saint-Benoît (St. Benedict Abbey). Founded around 630, it is one of the oldest abbeys of the Benedictine Order. In either 660 or 703, the remains of Saint Benedict of Nursia were transferred to Fleury from the Abbey of Monte Cassino in Italy by Abbot Mummolus of Fleury.

The monastery, known for the Fleury Playbook, was pillaged and damaged multiple times over the course of history, including during the Norman invasions and the French Revolution. The current abbey church is in the Romanesque style and dates from the eleventh century. A community of approximately 40 monks currently resides in the monastery, rebuilt after the Second World War.

== Population ==
Historical population
Year	Pop.	±% p.a.
1968	1,597	—
1975	1,790	+1.64%
1982	1,925	+1.04%
1990	1,880	−0.30%
1999	1,876	−0.02%
2007	1,985	+0.71%
2012	2,063	+0.77%
2017	2,030	−0.32%
2023	1,982	−0.40%
Source: INSEE

== See also ==
- Communes of the Loiret department
- Saint-Benoît-du-Sault
