= Pierre de Maillezais =

Pierre de Maillezais was the author of a chronicle history in two volumes of Maillezais Abbey, which was located in present-day Vendée, France.

This author, a Benedictine monk, is otherwise little known in terms of hard facts; the manuscript of the chronicle, shortened Latin title Qualiter fuit constructum Malliacense monasterium is now dated to c. 1060; or c. 1070, and relating to a foundation "myth". He edited a Crusader work Historiae Hierosolymitanae libri IV written by Baldric of Dol. Older works make the author abbot, and place him somewhat later. He is reputed as an admirer of Cicero, founder of a library, and a follower of William IX of Aquitaine on the First Crusade.
