= Flavius Rusticus Helpidius =

Flavius Rusticius Helpidius was a fifth-century poet.

== Identity ==
His name appears in the manuscript of Pomponius Mela and Julius Paris as the signature of a reviser, in the form Fl. Rusticius Helpidius Domnulus. Julius Paris is an abbreviator of Valerius Maximus, and lived at the end of the fourth century or the beginning of the fifth. Among the signatures of revisers of certain manuscripts he appears as quaestor sacri palatii ("count of the consistory").

There is a correspondent of Sidonius Apollinaris named Domnulus, who, along with other major aristocrats, was present at a formal banquet for the Emperor Majorian during the winter of 458/459; this event is usually placed at Arles, but some authorities locate it at Lyon. Sidonius calls his acquaintance an ex-quaestor, which has led experts to not only identify the two, but also one Rusticus Helpidius, another ex-quaestor and author of the Historiarum testamenti veteris it novi and the Carmen de Christi Iesu beneficiis as the same person.

Twenty-four strophes of three hexameters each, on scenes from the Old and New Testaments, survive attributed to Helpidius, the "former quaestor". Sixteen of these scenes correspond to one another, e.g. as type and fulfilment. These verses were probably intended as texts for the decoration of a church. Under the title of "Rustici Elpidii carmen de Christi beneficiis" a short poem of one hundred and forty hexameters celebrates the miracles of Christ. Its opening prayer is addressed to Christ as Creator and intimately united with the Father. A very mystical tone dominates these verses. There is an edition of W. Brandes (1890). For the aforesaid tristichs there are the old editions in Patrologia Latina.

== Helpidius the Deacon ==
The deacon Helpidius (died about 533), friend of Magnus Felix Ennodius and physician of Theodoric, King of the Ostrogoths, is unquestionably another person.
