= Baldric of Dol =

Breton bishop

Baldric of Dol (1046 – January 5/7, 1130) was prior and then abbot of Bourgueil from 1077 to 1106, then made bishop of Dol-en-Bretagne in 1107 and archbishop in 1108 until his death. He fulfilled his monastic duties by travelling to attend Church councils and writing of poetry and history, his most influential piece being a historical account of the First Crusade.

== Life ==
He was born in Meung-sur-Loire, most likely in 1046, where he passed his early days. He was of a modest background, not coming from nobility and belonging to a rural farming class. While living in Meung-sur-Loire, Baldric may have attended the Benedictine house of Saint Liphard, which had recently been established, for his early education. This would only have been the beginning of Baldric’s education in monastic schools as, despite not coming from a particularly wealthy area, there were many schools established by the Church with talented instructors around the Loire Valley to educate students in Latin due to the increasing demand for those who could work with text.

After a course of studies at the school of Angers, he entered the Abbey of Bourgueil in Anjou, where he became prior around 1077 and later abbot in 1089 following the death of his predecessor. Here, Baldric and his monks lived by a Benedictine rule, which states: “Idleness is the enemy of the soul.” To adhere to this lifestyle, Baldric would set to work studying writing and the texts that were a part of the wealthy monastery’s library. He would then put this knowledge to use when writing his poetry and history. In addition to his writing while at the abbey, Baldric witnessed charters, such as those of St. Aubin d’Angers, and took part in councils of the Church in France, one noteworthy example being the Council of Clermont in 1095, which he would include in his work on the First Crusade, that had been spurred by claims of Muslim violence toward Christian pilgrims. In addition to his various official duties, he was an active participant in the loose association of regional Latin literary writers known today as the Loire School.

Baldric would become a prevalent figure within the Church in Loire Valley, even developing rivalries for high-ranking Church positions. Bishop Ivo of Chartres accused Baldric to Hugh of Die of attempting to become bishop of Orléans through means of bribery. However, because of Ivo’s ill will toward Baldric, it is unknown if this claim is well-founded. In 1107 he received from Pope Paschal II the see of Dol, and once again Ivo of Chartres would oppose the decision, as would the clergy of Dol. Nonetheless, the pope overruled their opposition, making Baldric Archbishop of Dol a year later. Despite the ruling of the pope, Baldric was not able to win the favor of the clergy at Dol, leading him to travel to several locations across France and Europe for councils, witnessing charters, and resolving Church-related disputes rather than remaining at home with a hostile monastery. In Avranches, he witnessed a charter in 1115 which saw Henry I of England grant the monks who founded the abbey of Savigny, and were led by preacher and former hermit Vital of Mortian, its forest. Two years later he returned to Bourgueil to witness an agreement between it and the abbey of Montierneuf. Baldric also traveled to Rome multiple times, first in 1108, then in 1116, and finally in 1123 when he went to counter a charge that saw a papal legate suspend him and successfully clear his name.He also left an account of a journey to England and exercised considerable activity as bishop in reforming monastic discipline.

Baldric spent the last years of his life away from Dol near the coast of Normandy, writing, teaching, and visiting monasteries until his death in 1130 at the age of 84 years old. He was buried on December 30 of that same year in the abbey church of Saint Pierre-de-Preaux in the Diocese of Lisieux, remaining in his preferred region of France in Normandy where many monastic figures would originate from and spend their lives.

== Works ==
Baldric's poetic oeuvre was written almost entirely while abbot at Bourgueil. The 256 extant poems are found almost exclusively in a single contemporary manuscript which is most likely an authorized copy. They consist of a wide range of poetic forms ranging from epitaphs, riddles and epistolary poems to longer pieces such as an interpretative defense of Greek mythology and a praise poem for Adela of Normandy that describes something very like the Bayeux Tapestry within its 1,368 lines. His thematics are dominated by two great topics: desire/friendship (amor) and game/poetry (iocus). His constant citations and interpretations reveal a deep knowledge and appreciation of Ovid that was rare for the age, and many biblical allusions and references to classic texts throughout his works reflects the vast amount of literature available to Baldric during his time at the Abbey of Bourgueil. In only one of his poems, titled De sufficientia votorum suorum, inspiration from Roman poets Horace, Virgil, and Tibullus can be found.

Poetry was often an outlet for Baldric to express facets of his own life. He used it to communicate his rustic origins, noting in one poem that his sister was married to a farm laborer who would not have owned land. His epistolary poems to notable figures such as Count Roger of Sicily and Adela of Normandy also suggest Baldric had few ties to the aristocracy since he does not mention any connections with the nobility despite his attempts to impress them.

Baldric's most valuable work from the second part of his career is his "Historiae Hierosolymitanae libri IV", an account about 36,000 words long of the First Crusade, based in part on the testimony of eyewitnesses in the Gesta Francorum, and submitted for correction to the Abbot Peter of Maillezais, who had accompanied the Crusaders. He was one of the chief rewriters of this text, the other two being Robert the Monk and Guibert of Nogent. This work has 24 known surviving manuscripts, and was composed in 1105 before Baldric finished composing another version with added details and revisions two years later. Because, up until recently, only seven manuscripts were known to exist, it was thought that the text held little historical significance in comparison to other, more commonly found works. Additionally, while nearly all of the first seven manuscripts originated from France, the 17 that have since been found were located and possibly produced in multiple locations across Europe, further suggesting that this work is a more influential historical text than previously believed.

Due to having written the text years after the end of the First Crusade, Baldric was able to offer a hindsight perspective on the Christian forces, noting that they were socially respectful and deserved greater compensation than they were awarded. In the account, Baldric covers the time period from November of 1095 to August of 1099, beginning at the Council of Clermont, which Baldric was able to cover in greater detail compared to other authors who wrote on the event due to having been in attendance, where Pope Urban II delivered his sermon and ending with the conquest of Jerusalem where a Muslim army was defeated at Ascalon to end the First Crusade. Direct speech makes up a notable portion of the text, displaying Baldric’s unique writing style that places characters at the forefront of the narrative and is indicative of his belief that they should be used to communicate historical perspectives, which was not common among Medieval historical narratives.

Among his other works are poems on the conquest of England and on the reign of Philip I; lives, in Latin, of his friend Robertus de Arbrissello, of St. Valerian, and of St. Hugh of Rouen; finally a letter to the monks of Fécamp Abbey which contains some valuable material relating to Breton manners, and to English and Norman monasteries.
