= Alcher of Clairvaux =

Twelfth-century French monk

Alcher of Clairvaux was a twelfth-century Cistercian monk of Clairvaux Abbey. He was once thought to be the author of two works, now attributed by many scholars to an anonymous pseudo-Augustine of the same period.

Thomas Aquinas made the traditional attribution of the De spiritu et anima to Alcher. It is now reckoned to be a compilation of c. 1170, taken from Alcuin, Anselm, Bernard of Clairvaux, Augustine of Hippo, Cassiodorus, Hugh of St Victor, Isaac of Stella, and Isidore of Seville; also Boethius. It is a source for medieval views on self-control, and the doctrine that the soul rules the body.

De diligendo Deo is a devotional work, also traditionally attributed to Alcher.

At one point in the Summa Theologica, Aquinas writes about De Spiritu et Anima, "that book is not of great authority."
