= Adrevald =

Benedictine monk

Adrevald (c. 818 – 878) was a Benedictine monk and writer. He was born in a village near the Abbey of Fleury, which he later entered as a monk. He acquired considerable reputation by his writings, especially Opusculum de corpore et sanguine Domini, against the famous John Scotus Eriugena; the Vita sancti Agilulfi, a life of Saint Aygulf of Lérins, who died in 677; and the Historia miraculorum sancti Benedicti, a collection of miracles of Benedict of Nursia. Adrevald was the first to give to the governors of the provinces of the frontiers the title of margrave (marquis). He has often been confounded with Adelbert, another monk of Fleury who died in 853, and wrote an account of the translation of Benedict.
