= Adam Teuto =

Adam Teuto, also known as Coloniensis (flourished 14th century), was an early German author whose Latin-language writings emphasized ecclesiastical topics.

Adam Teuto's works appeared between 1355 and 1370. He is known for summarising in mnemonic rhymes Raymundus of Pennaforte's then-well-circulated book, Summa de poenitentia et matrimonio, which ultimately became a handbook for the clergy.

== Publications ==
- Summula clarissimi Raymundi brevissimo compendio sacramentorum alta complectens mysteria (1502). Cologne.
