= Wolbero of Cologne =

Wolbero (died 1167) was a Benedictine abbot of St Pantaleon Abbey, Cologne. He is known for his commentary on the Song of Songs, the first to be addressed to a female audience (nuns of Nonnenwerth).
