= Fleury Abbey =

Abbey in Saint-Benoît-sur-Loire, Loiret, France

Coordinates: 47°48′35.27″N 2°18′19.87″E

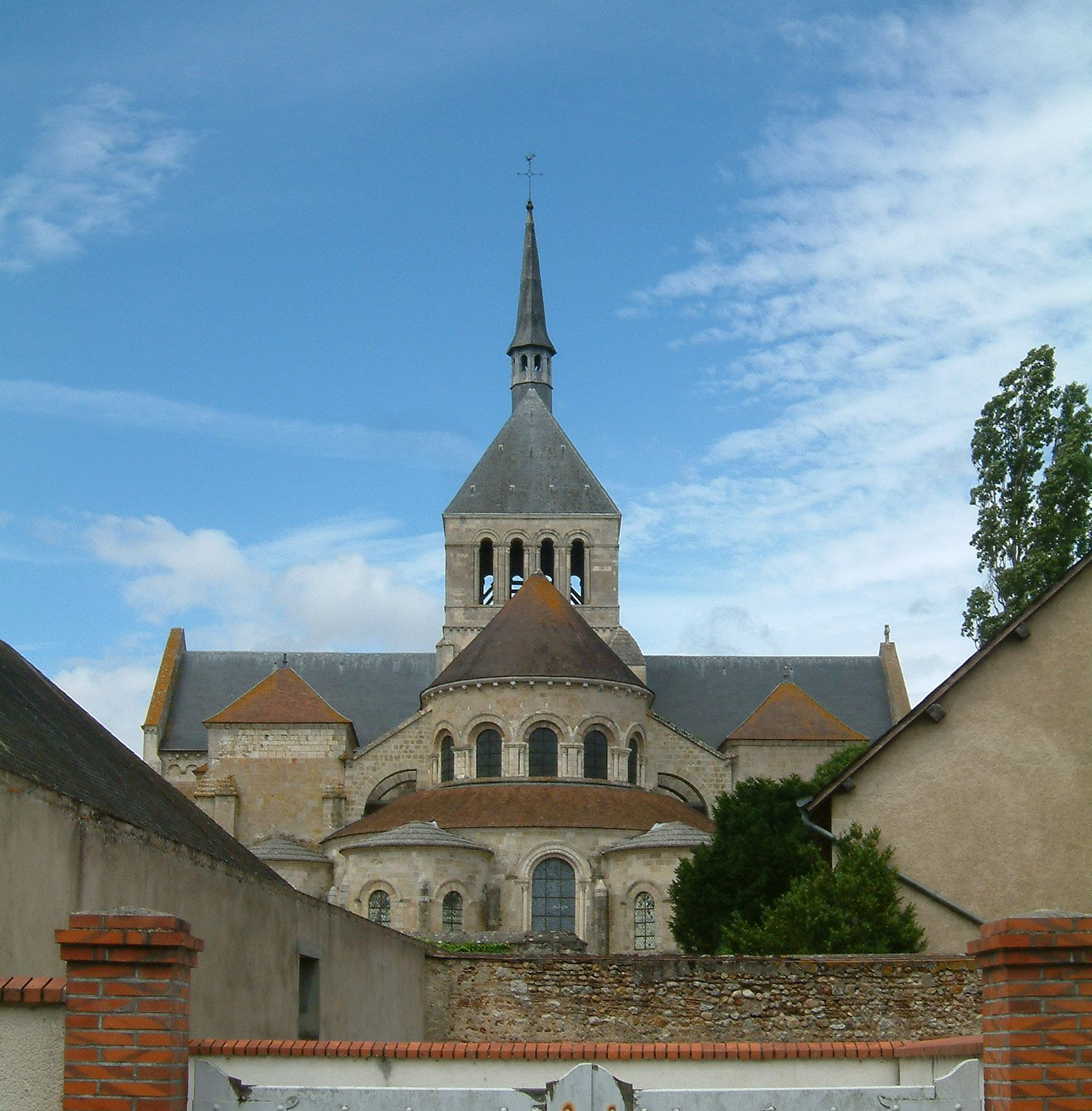
The abbey church rises above surrounding structures

Fleury Abbey (Floriacum) in Saint-Benoît-sur-Loire, Loiret, France, founded in about 640, is one of the most celebrated Benedictine monasteries of Western Europe, and possesses the relics of St. Benedict of Nursia. The abbey is around 35km south-west of Orléans, and easily accessible by the River Loire in a time before easy road transport. In 2010, the abbey had over forty monks led by the abbot Etienne Ricaud.

Abbo of Fleury (died 1004) a monk and abbot of Fleury was a theologian of wide-ranging intellect; his life was written by the chronicler Aimoin, also a monk of Fleury. Andrew of Fleury (writing c. 1043) wrote Miracula sancti Benedicti. Hugh of Fleury (died after 1118) was a monk of Fleury known for his chronicles and other writings.

== History ==
=== Foundation ===
The seventeenth-century Benedictine scholar Jean Mabillon accepted the traditional founding of Fleury as by Leodebaldus, abbot of St-Aignan (Orléans) about 640, in the existing Gallo-Roman villa of Floriacum, in the Vallis Aurea, the "Golden Valley". This was the spot selected by the Abbot of St-Aignan for his Benedictine foundation. Rigomarus was its first abbot.

=== Medieval history ===
The most famous of the Merovingian abbots was St. Mommolus, who effected the translation of the relics there of Benedict of Nursia. Pepin of Herstal, having considerably augmented the abbey, committed it to the direction of Saint Bain in 706. The monastery underwent a season of reform in its monastic life, about 930, along the lines first laid out at Cluny. The monastery enjoyed the patronage of the Carolingian dynasty for generations; it was also central to the political ambitions of the Robertian house descended from Robert I of France, several of whom had held the title Duke of the Franks. The monk of Fleury named Helgaud (died ca 1068), was chaplain to King Robert II and wrote a brief Epitoma vitae Roberti regis. Fleury had particular significance in lending legitimacy to its patrons. Although royal and ducal patronage had material advantages, there was also a price to be paid in terms of monastic autonomy when the ducal candidate conflicted with the choice of the monastic community.

Theodulphus, bishop of Orléans established at Fleury a school for young noblemen recommended there by Charlemagne. By the mid-ninth century its library was one of the most comprehensive ever assembled in the West, and scholars such as Lupus of Ferrières (d. 862) traveled there to consult its texts. Later under St. Abbo of Fleury (abbot 988-1004), head of the reformed abbey school, Fleury enjoyed a second golden age; it kept up close relations with abbeys in England.

The Fleury Playbook, dating from c.1200, was long kept at the abbey and may have been composed there.

=== Decline and revival ===
Later, among the non-resident abbots in commendam were Cardinals Odet de Coligny (brother of Admiral Coligny, the Huguenot leader) and Antoine Sanguin in the reign of François I and Cardinal Richelieu. The abbey was plundered by Protestant troops in the Wars of Religion, who melted down the reliquary of St Benedict. The community was revived in 1627, when it was taken over by monks of the reformed Congregation of St Maur. They rebuilt the church's central tower in 1661.

=== Modern history ===
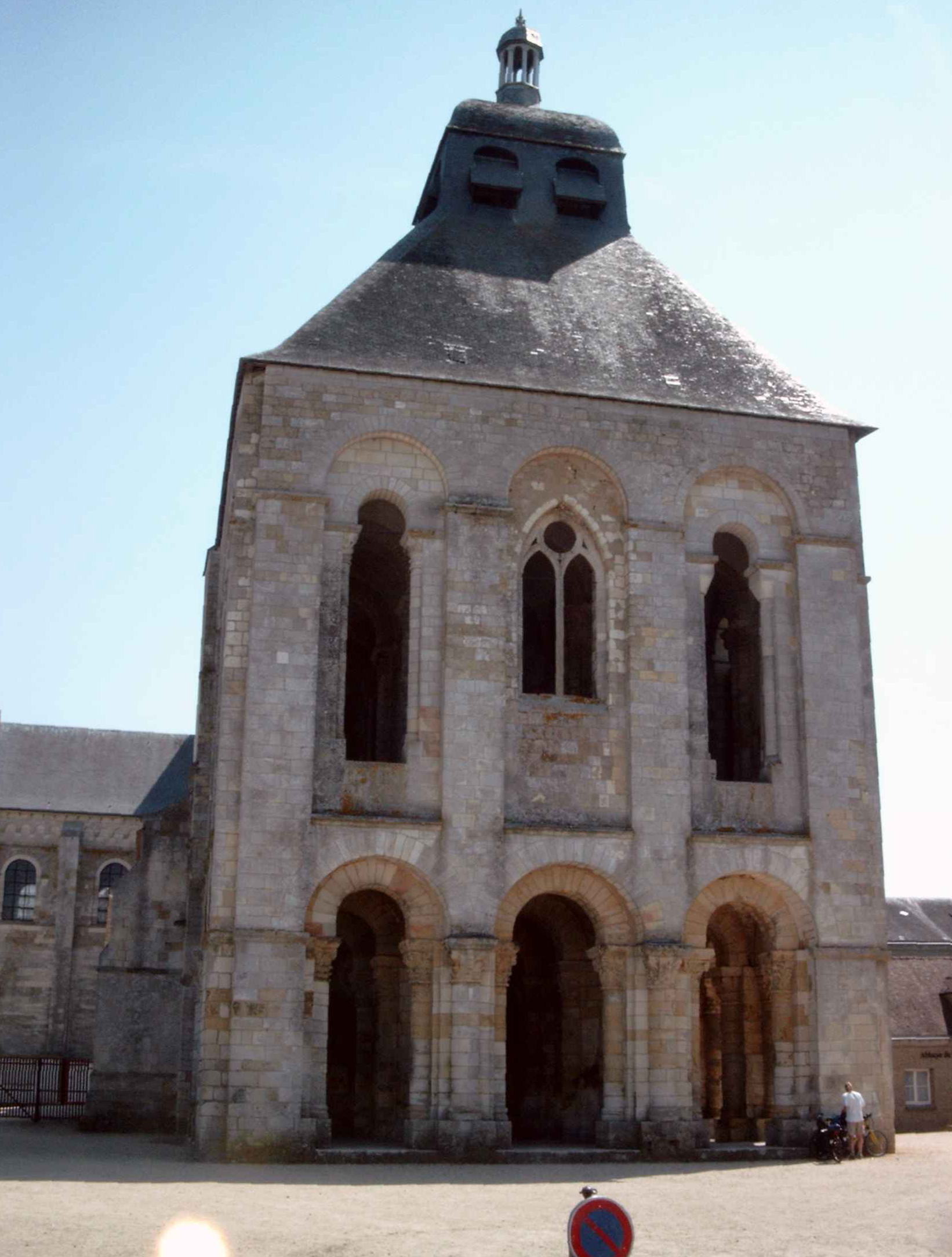
The truncated belltower

Like all Benedictine monasteries in France, the community was scattered by the French Revolution. Nevertheless, a Benedictine presence remained continually: the parish was held by a monk disguised as a secular priest, and there were numerous attempts to restore the monastery throughout the 19th century. The church was listed as a historic monument in 1835, enabling its preservation. In 1944, the community (which had been resident at Pierre-qui-Vire) was restored to the abbey, which was rebuilt as a member of the Subiaco Congregation. The monastery is remembered each day at evensong in Winchester Cathedral with an additional short said prayer at the conclusion of the responses – the Fleury Prayer.

== Church ==
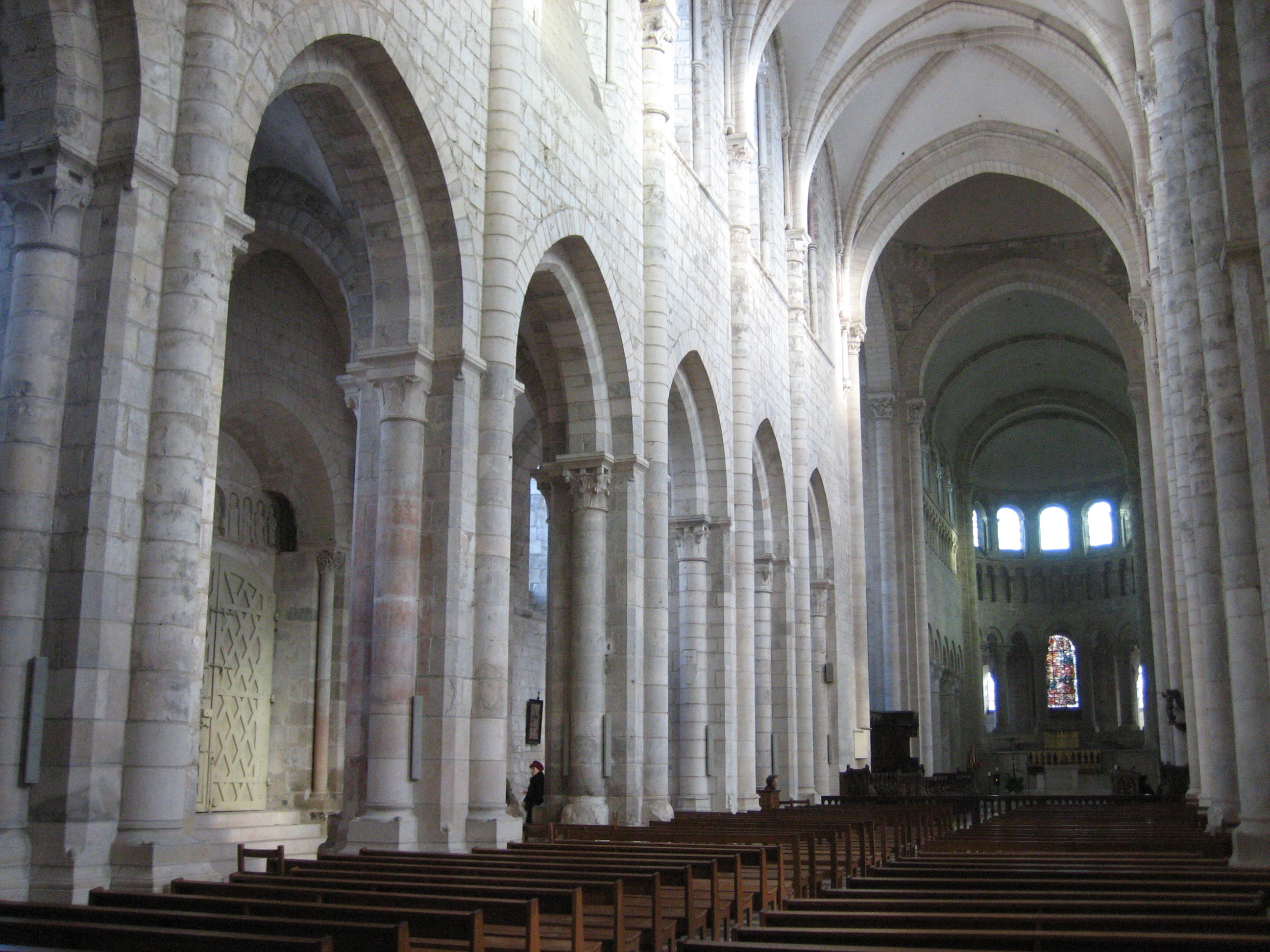
In the nave

The abbey formerly had two churches, one dedicated to St Peter and the other to the Virgin Mary. The church of St Peter was demolished in the eighteenth century; the existing church dedicated to the Virgin predated the founding of the monastery. The Normans penetrated via the Loire and burned the monastery buildings. in 1026, an accidental fire destroyed the church, which was replaced by the present Romanesque basilica, including a great west tower, which was completed in 1218. The tower of Abbot Gauzlin, resting on fifty columns, forms a unique porch. The church is about three hundred feet long, its transept one hundred and forty feet. The unusual feature of chapel-towers either side of the apse suggests that the designer may have been familiar with Imperial churches, like the cathedrals of Worms and Speyer. This unusual arrangement at Fleury may in turn have inspired the gargantuan abbey church of Cluny III. The earlier choir and west tower have round arches and simple barrel vaults (choir) and groined vaults (porch), while the later nave has pointed arches and a ribbed vault. Another design change was the elimination of the triforium in the nave. However, the building is unified by the finely-carved capitals throughout. The choir of the church contains the tomb of Philip I of France, buried there in 1108. Of the mediaeval abbey's buildings, only this basilica survives in the modern monastery.

== Benedict of Nursia's relics ==
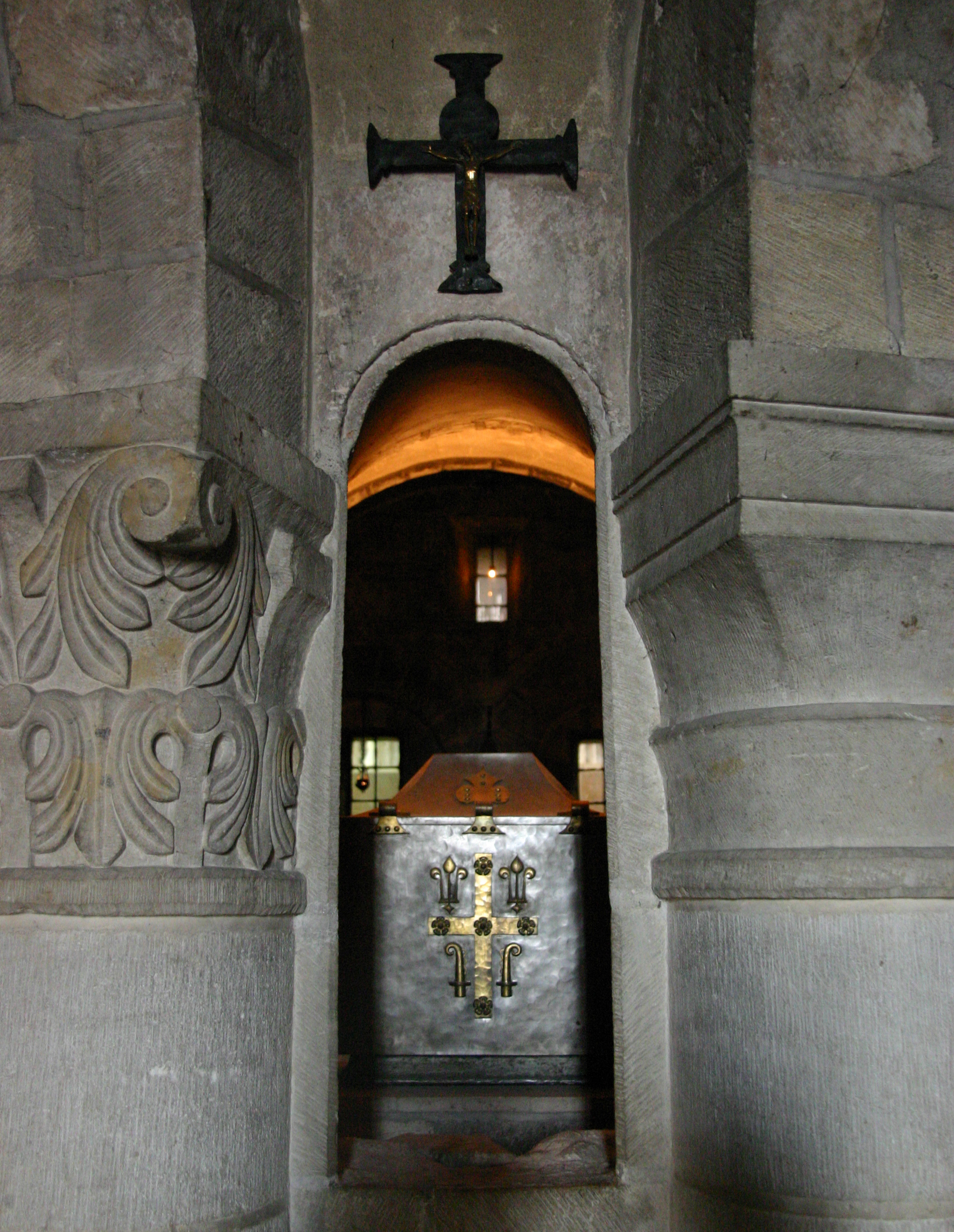
Reliquary of St. Benedict of Nursia

Fleury is reputed to contain the relics of St. Benedict of Nursia, the father of Western monasticism. Mommolus, the second Abbot of Fleury, is said to have effected their transfer from the Abbey of Monte Cassino in Italy when that abbey fell into decay after the ravages of the Lombards in the sixth century. Benedict's relics, and the Miracula S. Benedicti developed over three centuries by five monks of Fleury, including Andreas of Fleury (c. 1043), attracted pilgrims, bringing wealth and fame.

Monks of the Italian monastery in Monte Cassino, which was founded by Benedict himself, dispute this story, claiming that the relics remained at Monte Cassino.

== See also ==
- List of Carolingian monasteries
- Carolingian architecture
- Carolingian art
- Regional characteristics of Romanesque architecture
- Codex Floriacensis
