= Church of the Holy Cross, Bordeaux =

Roman Catholic church in Bordeaux, France

Coordinates: 44°49′52″N 0°33′40″W

Church of the Holy Cross Église Sainte-Croix
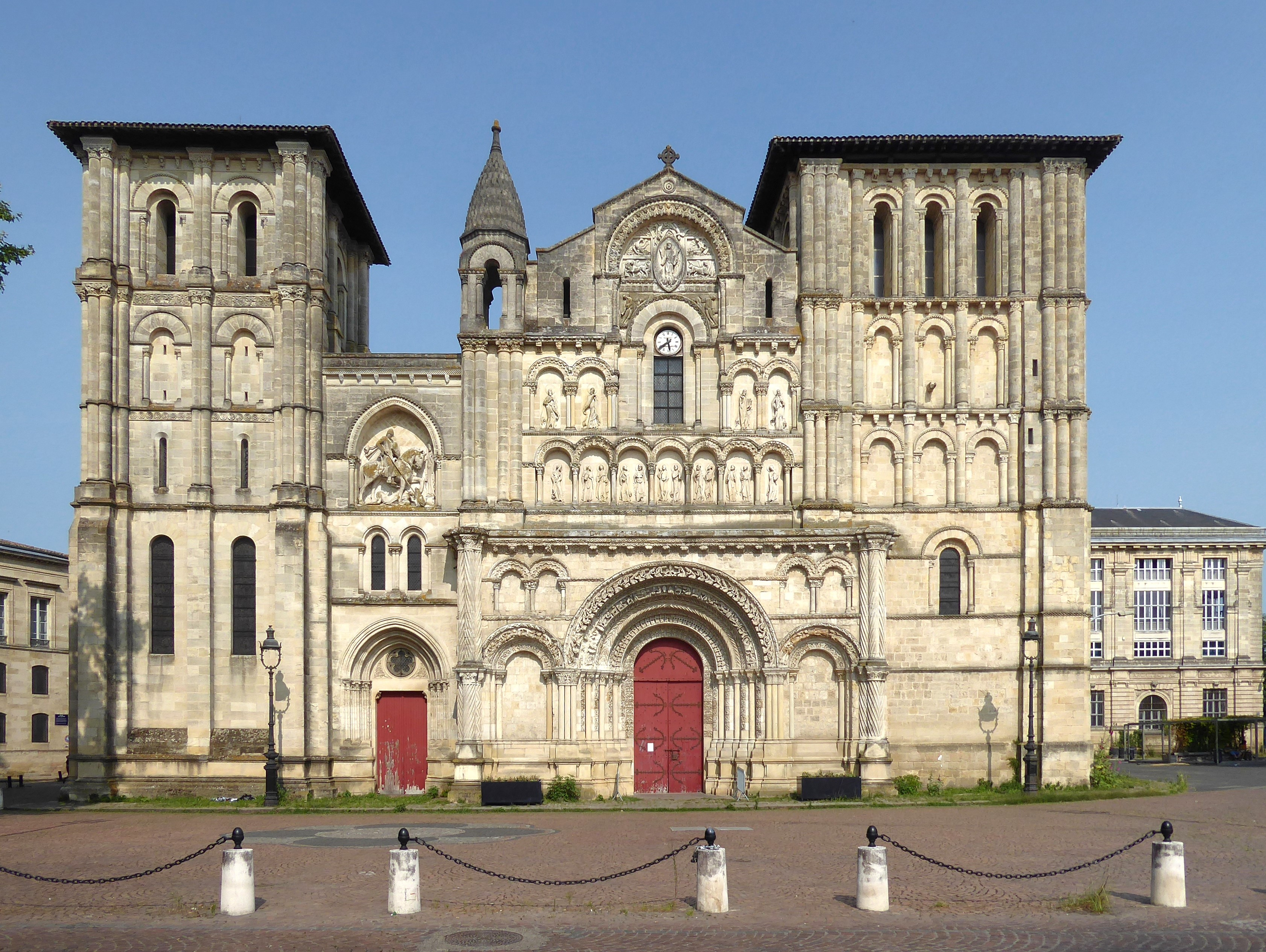
- Church of the Holy Cross

Religion
- Affiliation: Roman Catholic
- Region: Gironde
- Rite: Roman Rite
- Ecclesiastical or organisational status: Parish church
- Status: Active

Location
- Location: Bordeaux, France
- Interactive map of Church of the Holy Cross; Église Sainte-Croix

Architecture
- Type: church
- Groundbreaking: 11th century
- Completed: 19th century

The Church of the Holy Cross (French: Église Sainte-Croix) is a Roman Catholic church located in Bordeaux, southern France.

It was formerly the church of a Benedictine abbey founded in the 7th century, and was built in the late 11th-early 12th centuries. The façade is in the Romanesque architectural style.

The church has a nave and four aisles, a transept with apses on each arm, and a polygonal apse. The nave is 39 m long, while the apse is 15.30 m high. Its organ dates from the 18th century.

In the 19th century, the church was renovated by Paul Abadie. The former Benedictine abbey now houses the École des beaux-arts de Bordeaux.

== Gallery ==
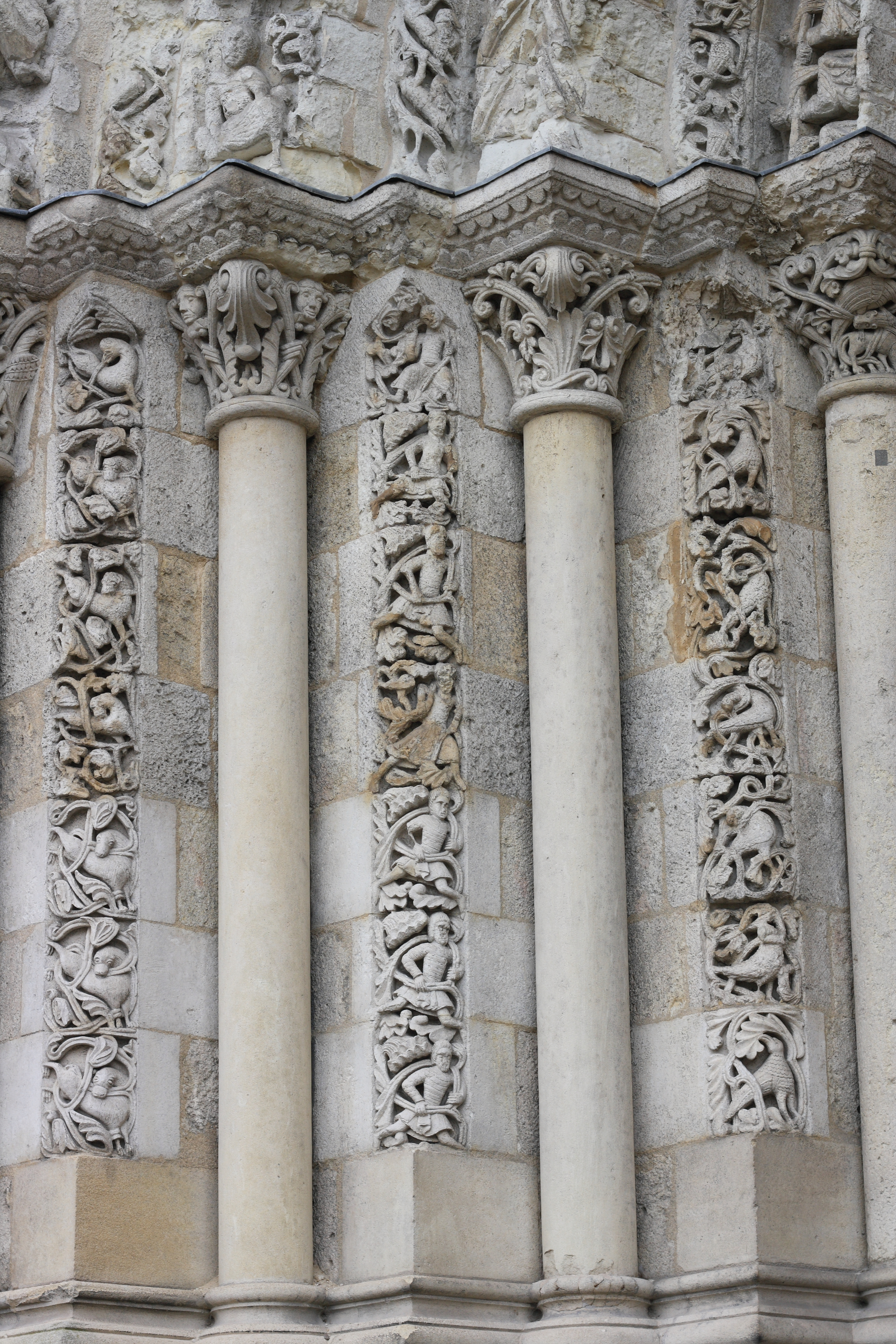
Romanesque west portal

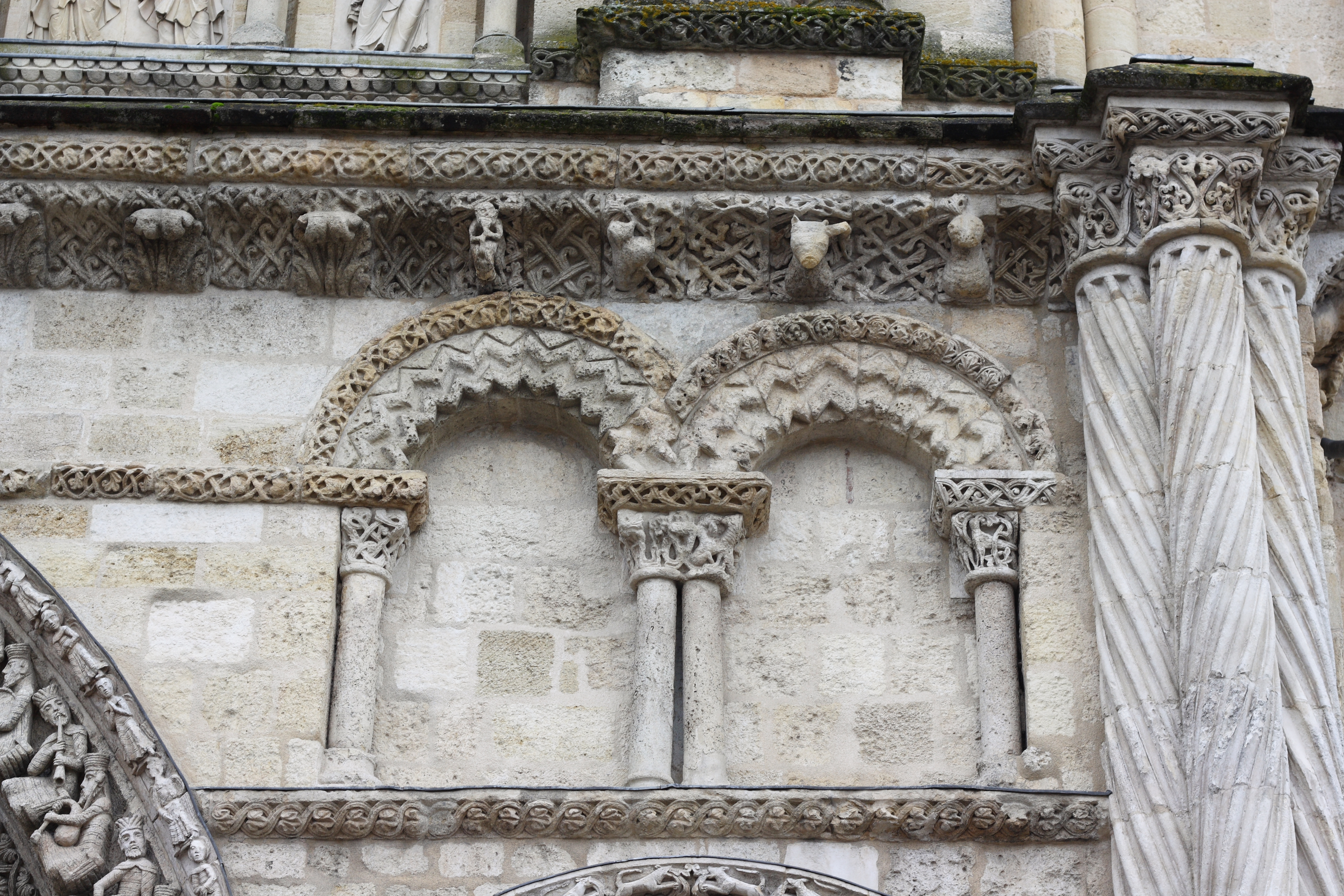
West facade with blind arcades

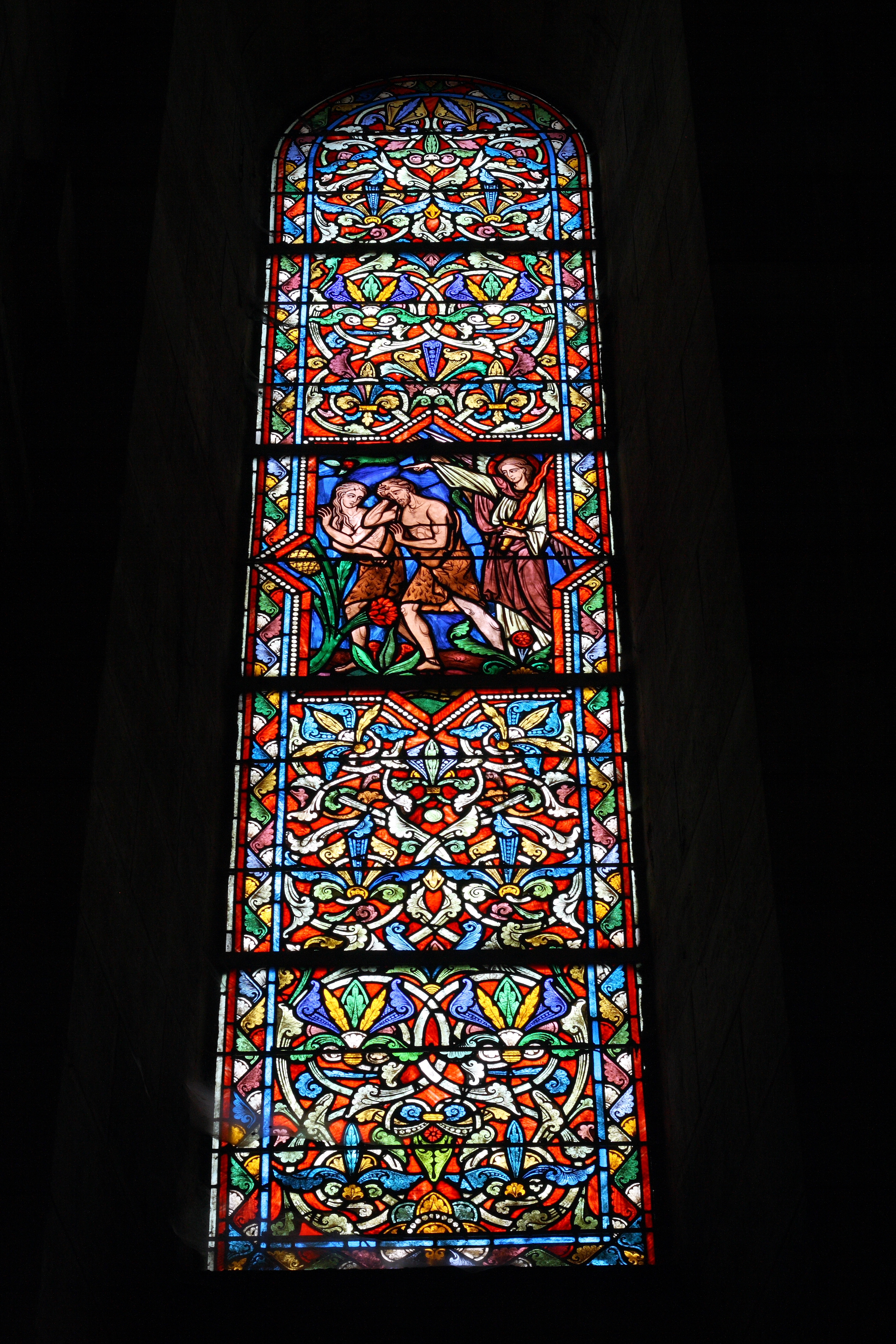
Expulsion from paradise

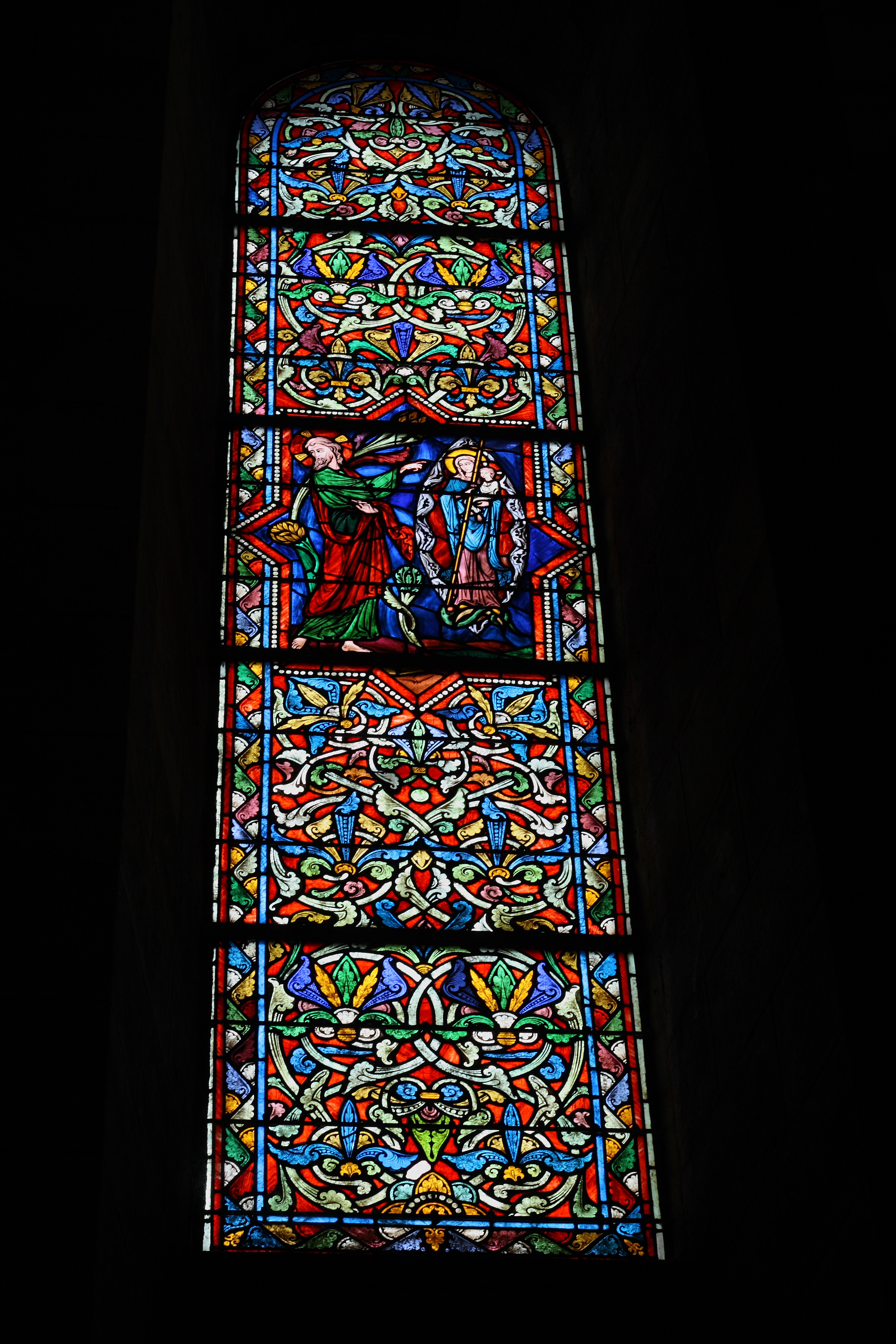
Mary and Jesus

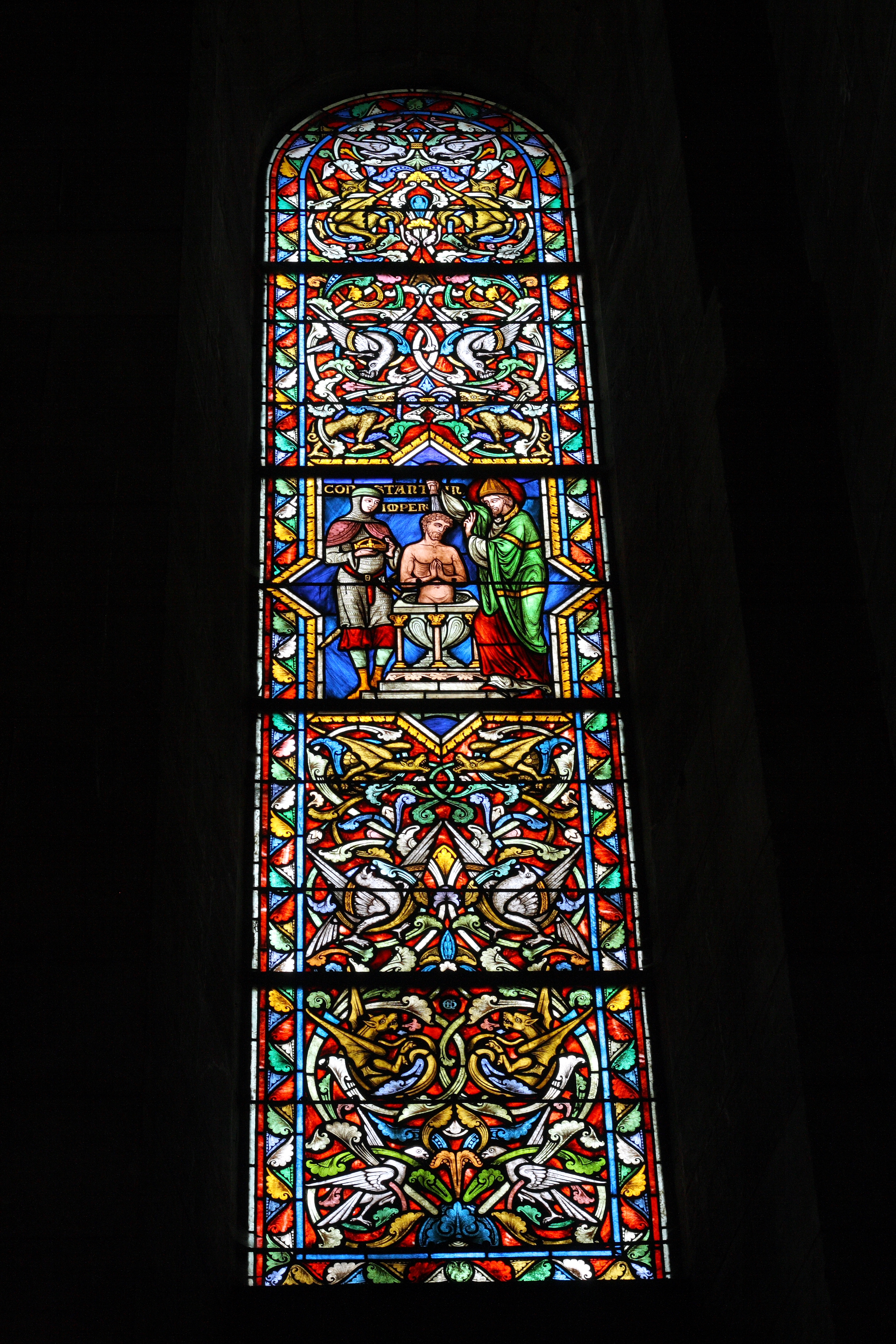
Constantine's baptism

== See also ==
- Plantagenet style
- Bordeaux Cathedral
