= Isaac of Stella =

English-born French Cistercian monk and theologian

Isaac of Stella, O.Cart (French: Isaac de l'Étoile; c. 1100 – c. 1170s) was a French Cistercian and later Carthusian monk, theologian and philosopher.

== Life ==
Born in England, after studies in Paris, he entered the Order of Cistercians, probably at Pontigny, during the reforms of Saint Bernard of Clairvaux. In 1147 he became abbot of the small monastery of Stella, outside Poitiers.

At some time in his later life, most probably in 1167, he left Stella to set up a monastery on the Île de Ré on the Atlantic coast. He later returned to Stella, where it is known that he lived into the 1170s since in one of his sermons he refers to meeting 'Saint' Bernard - and Bernard was only canonised in 1174.

Isaac's most popular work was an allegorical commentary on the canon of the Mass in the form of a letter to John of Canterbury, bishop of Poitiers. His 55 surviving sermons (and three sermon fragments), as well as his Letter to Alcher on the Soul, constitute his real theological contribution. The Letter (1962) was addressed to Alcher of Clairvaux, and combined Aristotelian and Neoplatonic theories about psychology with Christian mysticism. It exercised a significant role in later mystical speculation due to the incorporation of large sections of Isaac's work in the anthropological compendium known as De spiritu et anima (The Spirit and the Soul), which circulated under the name of Augustine and was widely used in the 13th century.

Isaac's works make use of logical argumentation, influenced by Augustine of Hippo's Neoplatonism.

== Sources ==
- "Isaac of Stella". Encyclopædia Britannica. 2006.
- Bernard McGinn, The Growth of Mysticism, (1994), pp286–296
- Bernard McGinn, The Golden Chain: A Study in the Theological Anthropology of Isaac of Stella, (Washington, DC: Cistercian Publications, 1972)
- J.-P. Migne, Patrologia Latina 194

== Translations ==
- The Selected Works of Isaac of Stella: A Cistercian Voice from the Twelfth Century, tr. D Deme, (Aldershot: Ashgate, 2007)
- Sermons for the Christian Year, tr. H McCaffrey, (Kalamazoo, MI: Cistercian Publications, 1979)
- Epistola de anima, in B McGinn (tr), Three Treatises on Man: A Cistercian Anthropology, (Kalamazoo, MI: Cistercian Publications, 1977)
