= Godfrey of Saint Victor =

French monk and theologian

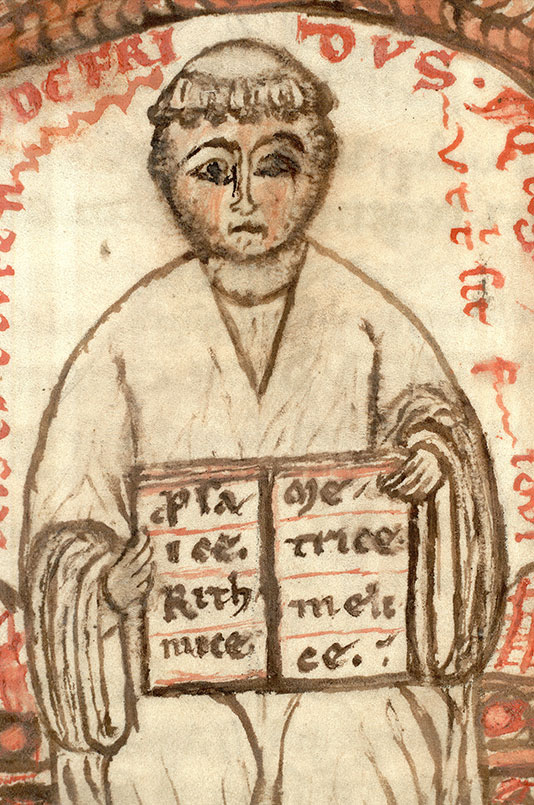
self-portrait (BM ms. 1002 fol. 144), c. 1180.

Godfrey of St. Victor (Geoffroy, Godefridus, Galfredus c. 1125 – c. 1195) was a French monk and theologian, and one of the last major figures of the Victorines. He was a supporter of the study of ancient philosophy and of the Victorine mysticism of Hugh of St. Victor and Richard of St. Victor.

He is also known under the alternative bynames of Breteuil and of Saint Barbara.

He is the author of two important works, Microcosmus and Fons Philosophiae, both written in the 1170s. Microcosmus is extant in an autograph (BM ms. 1002, dated c. 1178–1180), including two self-portraits. Parts of Godfrey's work are edited in Patrologia Latina, as Godefridus S. Victoris (notitia et fragmenta, in vol. 196, as Gaufridus aput sanctam Barbaram in Neustria subprior canonicorum regularium (epistolae in vol. 205).

== Life ==
He had initially studied and taught the trivium at the University of Paris between the years 1144 and 1155 at the school on the Petit Pont founded by Adam of Balsham. Like his friend Stephen of Tournai, to whom he dedicated Fons philosophiae, he may have studied law at Bologna. He was prior at Saint-Barbe-en-Auge, and later entered St. Victor's Abbey, Paris, an Augustinian establishment of canons regular. A product of the secular schools, Godfrey is thought to have entered St Victor after becoming dissatisfied with Parisian intellectual culture. Godfrey was assigned to a priory at some point after 1173 – it is thought that his humanistic outlook may have displeased Walter of St Victor who had succeeded Richard of St Victor as prior. He returned to the Abbey in 1185–6, and served there as armarius, in which capacity he was responsible for the production and preservation of the abbey's manuscripts, particularly those used in the liturgy. He remained there until his own death around 1194/6.

== Works ==
- The poem Fons Philosophiae (Fountain of Philosophy).
- Microcosmus (OCLC 931439)
- Preconium Augustini

Thirty-two sermons also survive. Most are unpublished, but the published sermons include:

- Sermo in generali capitulo (Sermon at a General Chapter)
- Sermo de omnibus sanctis (Sermon for All Saints)
- Sermo de omnibus sanctis et specialiter de Sancto Victore (Sermon for All Saints and St Victor)
- Anathomia Corporis Christi
- De Spirituale corpore Christi

=== Microcosmus ===
The central theme of Microcosmus recalls the insight of classical philosophy and of the early Church Fathers, viz., that man is a microcosm, containing in himself the material and spiritual elements of reality. Microcosmus offers one of the first attempts by a medieval Scholastic philosopher to systematize history and knowledge into a comprehensive, rational structure. Godfrey used the symbolism of a biblical framework to treat the physical, psychological, and ethical aspects of man. He affirmed man's matter-spirit unity and the basic goodness of his nature, tempering this optimism with the realization that human nature has been weakened ("fractured") by sin, but not to an intrinsically corrupted and irreparable extent. In the Microcosmus Godfrey compared sensuality, imagination, reason and intelligence to the respective four classical elements, earth, water, air and fire. Godfrey admits four principal capabilities in man: sensation, imagination, reason, and intelligence. Man's analytic reason and power of insight have the theoretical science of philosophy for their natural fulfillment. But a supernatural fulfillment, he maintains, consists in love. To this end divine intervention is needed to confer on man the perfective graces, or gifts, of enlightenment, affectivity, and perseverance.

=== Fons philosophiæ ===
In his other notable work, the Fons philosophiae (c. 1176; "The Fount of Philosophy"), Godfrey, in rhymed verse, proposed a classification of learning and considered the controversy between realists and nominalists (who held that ideas were only names, not real things) over the problem of universal concepts. Fons philosophiae is an allegorical account of the sources of Godfrey's intellectual formation (e.g., Plato, Aristotle, and Boethius), symbolized as a flowing stream from which he drew water as a student.

Another treatise, "Anatomy of the Body of Christ," appended to Fons Philosophiae, is a leading example of medieval Christian symbolism. A long poem ascribing to each member and organ of Christ's body some aspect of man's natural and supernatural purpose, it assembled texts from the early Church Fathers and helped form medieval devotion to the humanity of Christ. Godfrey's writings have won appreciation as a prime example of 12th-century humanism only through relatively recent scholarship, although their fundamental concepts of the positive values of man and nature were recognized to a limited extent by the high Scholasticism of the 13th century.

The Fons Philosophiae was a didactic poem presented to Abbot Stephen of St. Genevieve on the occasion of his appointment to the position at some point following 1173. It was originally one of three treatises, forming a unified corpus when combined with the Anathomia Corporis Christi and the De Spirituale corpore Christi. All three were presented by Godfrey to the Abbot as a matching set of spiritual works. The poem describes an exploration of the seven liberal arts as an allegorical journey through a system of rivers, in which draughts from different streams render different meanings. The Preconium Augustini is a poem on Augustine of Hippo of about 500 lines.

=== Translations ===
- Hugh Feiss, ed, On love: a selection of works of Hugh, Adam, Achard, Richard and Godfrey of St Victor, (Turnhout: Brepols, 2011) [includes translation of parts 203-227 of Godfrey of St Victor, Microcosm]
- Franklin T Harkins and Frans van Liere, eds, Interpretation of scripture: theory. A selection of works of Hugh, Andrew, Richard and Godfrey of St Victor, and of Robert of Melun, (Turnhout, Belgium: Brepols, 2012) [includes translation of Godfrey of St Victor, The fountain of philosophy, by Hugh Feiss]
- Synan, Edward A. Godfrey of St. Victor: The Fountain of Philosophy. Pontifical Institute of Medaeval Studies, Toronto 1972.
