= Conrad Rudolph =

American art historian

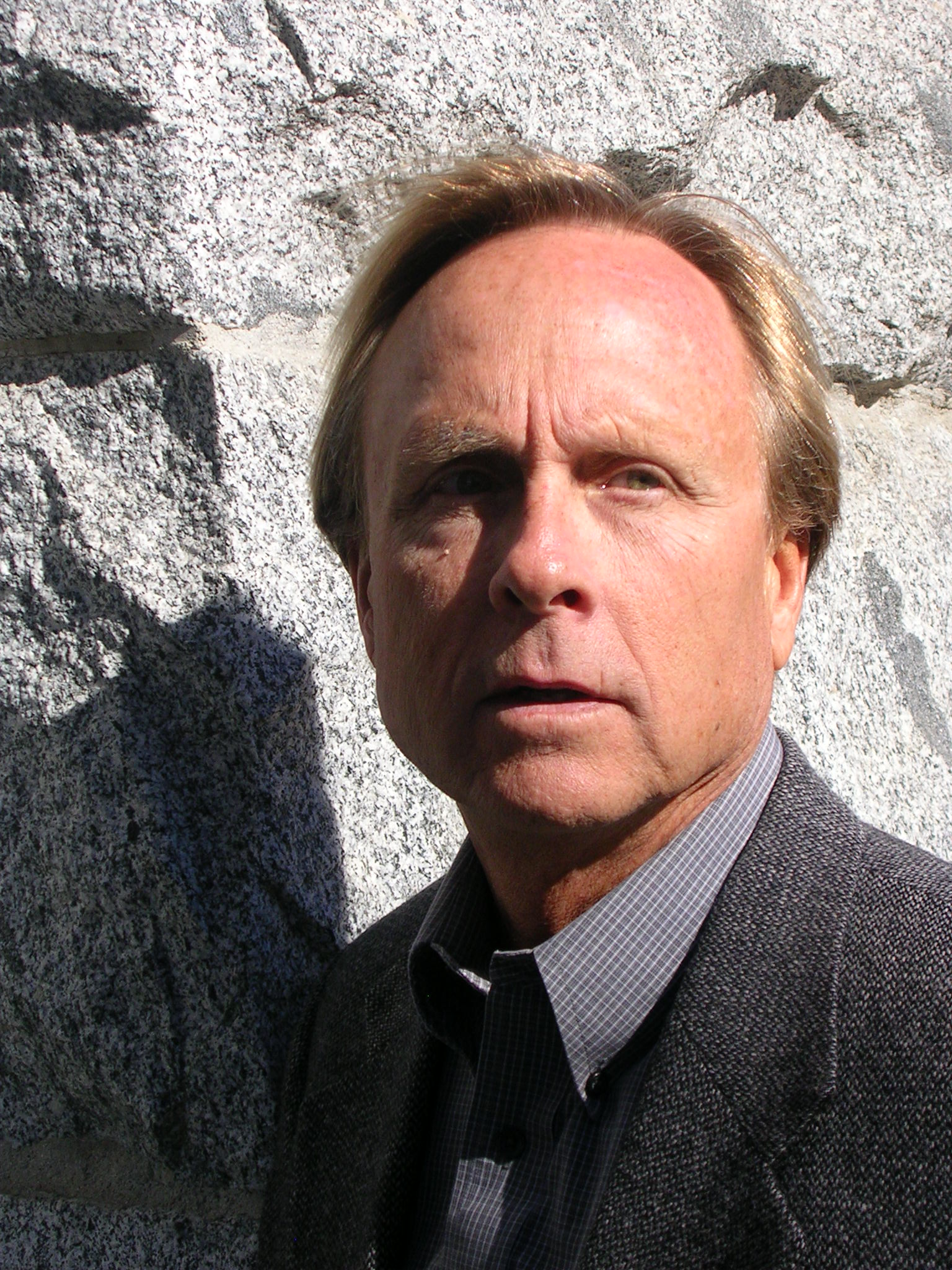
Conrad Rudolph

Conrad Rudolph (born 1951) is an American art historian and Distinguished Professor of Medieval Art History at the University of California, Riverside.

Rudolph is an elected Fellow of the Medieval Academy of America. He has received fellowships and grants from the Guggenheim Foundation, Getty Foundation, Mellon Foundation, and Kress Foundation, as well as from the National Endowment for the Humanities and the College Art Association. He has served on the board of editors/advisors of or acted as consultant for several academic journals (Art History, caa.reviews, Speculum, Architectural Histories, etc.) and university presses.

He has interests in such topics as medieval social theories of art, the ideological use of art, monasticism and art, the origin of Gothic art, and art and social change. He has worked on resistance to art in the West, using this to understand the origin of Gothic art at Saint-Denis. He has also worked on depictions of violence and daily life as complex depictions of monastic spiritual life (particularly in the Cîteaux Moralia in Job), medieval theories and images of creation, the pilgrimage in the Middle Ages, architectural building miracles as topoi of significant social meaning, the historiography of medieval art, the tour guide in the Middle Ages, the stained glass of Canterbury Cathedral, the Classic Cistercian church plan, the Rights of the Devil, and other subjects related to medieval artistic culture.

Some of his major studies include Bernard of Clairvaux's Apologia (the most important document we have to provide an understanding of medieval artistic culture and the twelfth-century controversy over art), Suger of Saint-Denis and the origin of Gothic art (including the invention of the Gothic portal and the exegetical stained-glass window), and Hugh of Saint Victor's Mystic Ark (the most complex individual work of figural art of the Middle Ages--an image of all time, all space, all matter, all human history, and all spiritual striving--a painting that was meant to be the subject of months-long discussions, repeated by others again and again).

He was Project Director for FACES (Faces, Art, and Computerized Evaluation Systems), a pioneering attempt to apply face recognition technology to works of art, specifically portraiture (funded through the National Endowment for the Humanities and the Kress Foundation).

As part of his interest in medieval culture, he spent two and a half months taking the thousand-mile medieval pilgrimage on foot from Le Puy in south-central France to Santiago de Compostela in northwestern Spain.

== Personal life ==
Conrad Rudolph is the son of Richard C. Rudolph, former professor of Chinese Literature and Archaeology at the University of California, Los Angeles. He is married and has two children.

== Select bibliography ==
- The Mystic Ark: Hugh of Saint Victor, Art, and Thought in the Twelfth Century (Cambridge University Press, Cambridge and New York, 2014).
- "First, I Find the Center Point": Reading the Text of Hugh of Saint Victor's The Mystic Ark (American Philosophical Society, Philadelphia, 2004).
- Violence and Daily Life: Reading, Art, and Polemics in the Cîteaux Moralia in Job (Princeton University Press, Princeton, 1997).
- Artistic Change at St-Denis: Abbot Suger's Program and the Early Twelfth-Century Controversy over Art (Princeton University Press, Princeton, 1990).
- The "Things of Greater Importance": Bernard of Clairvaux's Apologia and the Medieval Attitude Toward Art (University of Pennsylvania Press, Philadelphia, 1990).
- (ed.) A Companion to Medieval Art: Romanesque and Gothic in Northern Europe, Blackwell Companions in Art History, 2nd ed. (Wiley-Blackwell, Oxford, 2016).
- "FACES: Faces, Art, and Computerized Evaluation Systems--A Feasibility Study of the Application of Face Recognition Technology to Works of Portrait Art," with, Amit Roy-Chowdhury, Ramya Srinivasan, and Jeanette Kohl, Artibus et Historiae (2016).
- "Medieval Architectural Theory, the Sacred Economy, and the Public Presentation of Monastic Architecture: The Classic Cistercian Plan," Journal of the Society of Architectural Historians 78 (2019) 259-275.
- "The Tour Guide in the Middle Ages: Guide Culture and the Mediation of Public Art," Art Bulletin 100 (2018) 36-67.
- "The Parabolic Discourse Window and the Canterbury Roll: Social Change and the Assertion of Elite Status at Canterbury Cathedral," Oxford Art Journal 38 (2015) 1-19.
- "Inventing the Exegetical Stained-Glass Window: Suger, Hugh, and a New Elite Art," Art Bulletin 93 (2011) 399-422.
- "Inventing the Gothic Portal: Suger, Hugh of Saint Victor, and the Construction of a New Public Art at Saint-Denis," Art History 33 (2010) 568-595.
- "A Sense of Loss: An Overview of the Historiography of Romanesque and Gothic Art," A Companion to Medieval Art: Romanesque and Gothic in Northern Europe, ed. Conrad Rudolph (Blackwell Publishing, Oxford, 2006) 1-43.
- "In the Beginning: Theories and Images of Creation in Northern Europe in the Twelfth Century," Art History 22 (1999) 3-55.
- "Building-Miracles as Artistic Justification in the Early and Mid-Twelfth Century," Radical Art History: Internationale Anthologie, ed. Wolfgang Kersten (Zip Verlag, Zurich, 1997) 398-410.
