= School of Saint Victor =

French monastic school, 1100s–1300s

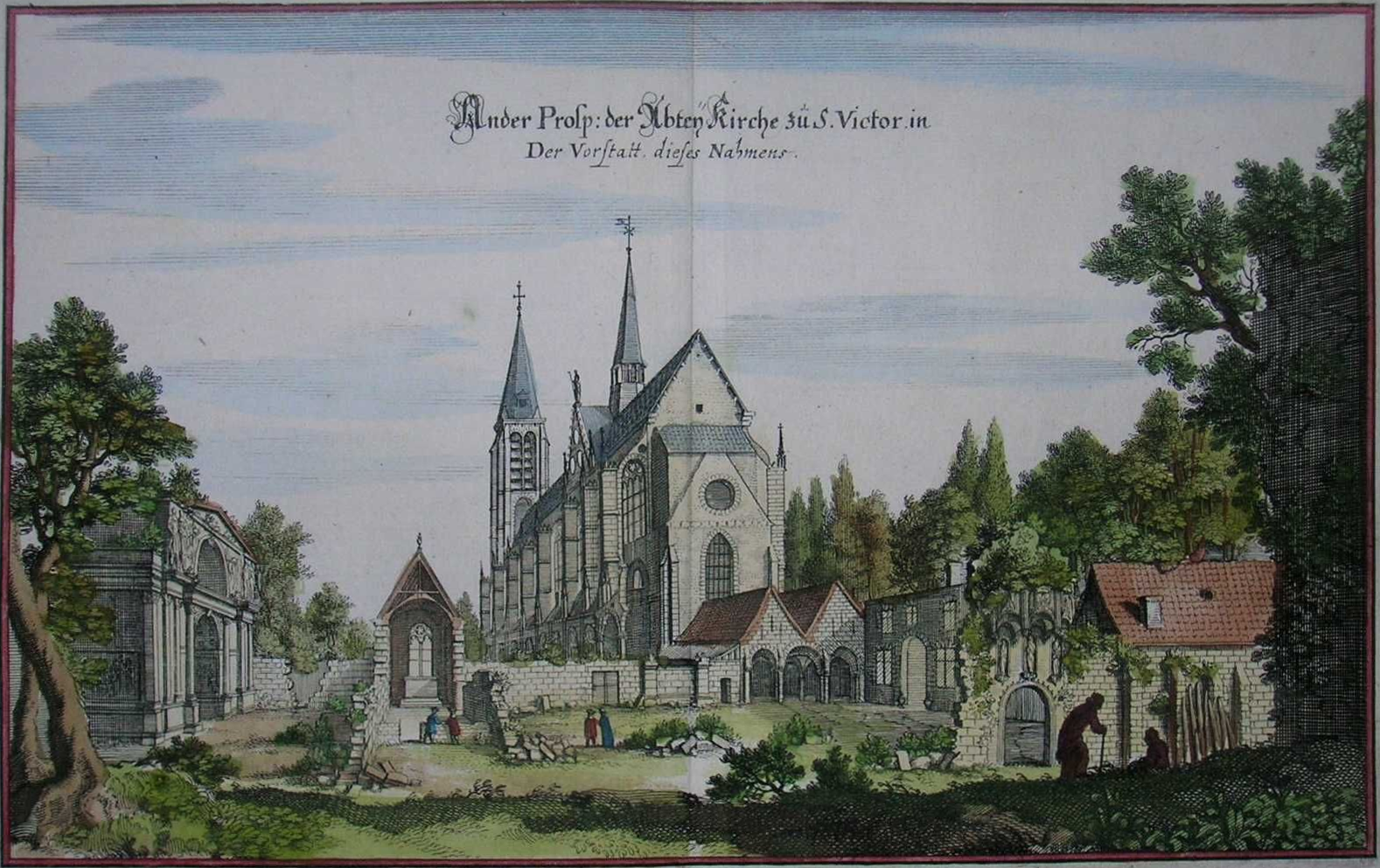
Abbey of St. Victor, 1655

The school of St Victor was the medieval monastic school at the Augustinian abbey of St Victor in Paris. The name also refers to the Victorines, the group of philosophers and mystics based at this school as part of the University of Paris.

It was founded in the twelfth century by Peter Abelard's tutor and subsequent opponent, the realist school master William of Champeaux, and a prominent early member of their community was Hugh of St Victor. Other prominent members were Achard of St. Victor, Andrew of St Victor, Richard of St Victor, Walter of St Victor and Godfrey of St Victor, as well as Thomas Gallus.

Under the rigorous supervision of Hugh, St Victor offered a coherent and structured approach to learning through the cultivation of personal virtue rather than the requisition of knowledge for its own sake. This is exemplified in the schema for the liberal arts laid out in Hugh's Didascalicon, in which he exhorts the reader to Omnia Disce, or to know all. By 1160, the abbey had become a place of retreat from the schools, echoing the original act of weary retirement enacted by William of Champeaux at its founding. By the time of Godfrey, St Victor was primarily concerned with the instruction of its own canons, rather than the emphasis on the external school operated earlier in the twelfth century.

The end of the Victorines as a unique force came by 1173, when the reactionary Walter was appointed as prior. Walter launched a furious attack upon the intellectual culture of the school and its members with his Contra quatuor labyrinthos Francae (Against the Four Labyrinths of France), a denunciation of secular theological teaching. After this violent repudiation of Victorine pedagogical tradition the abbey was, in effect, a self-contained Augustinian priory like any other. Jan van Ruusbroec submitted his Groenendael Priory to their Rule in 1335, from which stemmed the Brethren of the Common Life and Thomas à Kempis' Devotio Moderna. A major theme of their studies was the anagogical relationship between the Divine and the Mundane, adopted by Pope Eugene IV in his 5.1.1435 bull declaring Roman supremacy.
