= Beauport =

Beauport may refer to:

- Beauport, Quebec City
- Beauport—Limoilou, a federal electoral district in Beauport, Quebec City
- Battle of Beauport, 1759
- Beauport (Gloucester, Massachusetts)
- Beauport Harfangs, an ice hockey team
- Lac-Beauport, Quebec
- Beauport Park, East Sussex, England
- Beauport Abbey, Paimpol, Brittany, France
