= Andrew of Saint Victor =

12th-century Christian theologian

Andrew of Saint Victor (died 19 October 1175) was an Augustinian canon of the abbey of Saint Victor in Paris, a Christian Hebraist and biblical exegete. His learning "reflects a great humanist culture ... put at the service of theology," while he emphasised the literal meaning of the Old Testament "to an extent not found elsewhere in the Middle Ages."

== Life ==
Originally from England, Andrew went to Paris and studied under Abbot Hugh of Saint Victor. Around 1147 he was elected the first abbot of the Victorine daughter house of Saint James at Wigmore in England. He was at Wigmore between 1148/1149 and 1153, when he left after disagreements with the canons. He returned to Saint Victor for a time before finally returning to Wigmore between 1161 and 1163. He died at Wigmore in October 1175.

Andrew wrote commentaries exclusively on the Old Testament, covering the Octateuch, the major and minor Prophets, the Book of Proverbs and Ecclesiastes. To an even greater extent than his teacher, Hugh, he employed a literal exegesis. His hermeneutical scheme was based on the littera–sensus–sententia division of classical rhetoric. Besides classical authors, he made use of the Church Fathers and of Jewish Peshat exegesis.

== Sources ==
- Berndt, Rainer (1991). André de Saint-Victor (†1175), exégète et théologien. Bibliotheca Victorina, 2. Paris: Brepols.
- Berndt, Rainer (2002). "Andrew of Saint-Victor". In André Vauchez (ed.). Encyclopedia of the Middle Ages. James Clarke & Co..
- Cross, F. L.; Livingstone, E. A., eds. (2005). "Andrew of St-Victor". The Oxford Dictionary of the Christian Church (3rd rev. ed.). Oxford: Oxford University Press.
- Gibson, Margaret (2004). "St Victor, Andrew of (c.1110–1175), rev.". Oxford Dictionary of National Biography. Oxford University Press. doi:10.1093/ref:odnb/37116.
- McKane, William (1989). "Andrew of St Victor". Selected Christian Hebraists. Cambridge: Cambridge University Press. pp. 42–75, 215–25, 248f.
- Signer, M. A. (1993). "Peshat, Sensus Litteralis and Sequential Narrative: Jewish Exegesis and the School of St. Victor in the 12th Century". In B. Walfish (ed.). The Frank Talmage Memorial Volume. Vol. 1. Haifa: Haifa University Press. pp. 203–16.
- Smalley, Beryl (1938). "Andrew of St. Victor, Abbot of Wigmore: A Twelfth Century Hebraist". Recherches de théologie ancienne et médiévale. 10: 358–373. JSTOR 26184008.
- Van Liere, Frans (1995). Andrew of St Victor: Commentary on Samuel and Kings (PhD). University of Groningen.
