= La Lucerne Abbey =

12th-century abbey of Norbertine canons regular in Normandy

Coordinates: 48°47′30″N 1°27′57″W

Abbey of La Lucerne
- Abbaye de La Lucerne
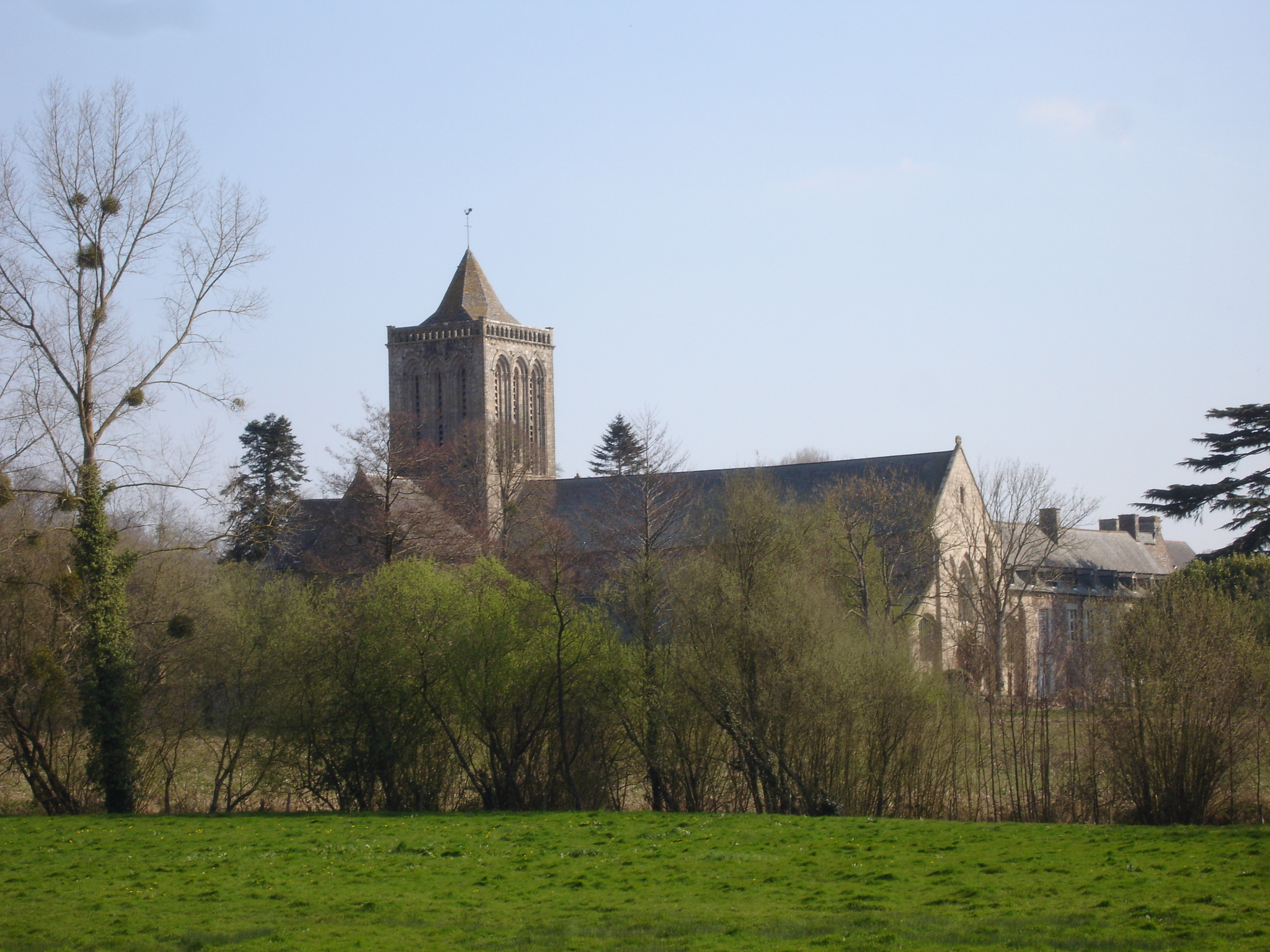
- Interactive map of Abbey of La Lucerne

Monastery information
- Full name: Abbey of the Most Holy Trinity
- Order: Premonstratensian
- Established: 1143
- Disestablished: 1792
- Mother house: Dommartin Abbey
- Dedication: Holy Trinity
- Consecrated: 1144 & 1178
- Diocese: Bayeux

People
- Founder: Hasculf de Subligny
- Important associated figures: Achard of St. Victor

Architecture
- Heritage designation: Historical Monument
- Groundbreaking: 1164
- Completion date: 1178

Site
- Location: La Lucerne-d'Outremer, Manche
- Country: France

The Abbey of the Most Holy Trinity of La Lucerne (French: Abbaye Très-Sainte-Trinité de la Lucerne), also known as La Lucerne Abbey (later also known as La Lucerne-d'Outremer, from its connection to the English crown, whence the name of the present commune) was a Premonstratensian canonry founded in the 12th century. It is situated in the forests of the Thar river valley in the Manche department of Normandy.

== History ==
The abbey was founded in 1143 by Hasculf de Subligny, son of Othoerne, the tutor of William Adelin, both of whom perished in the White Ship disaster of 1120, and later had the support of the English crown. The new monastery was settled by Norbertine canons regular from Dommartin Abbey near Hesdin, under the leadership of Tancred, the canonry's first prior. It was initially located on the land donated by Hasculf known as Courbefosse. The chapel of the monastery was dedicated in 1144 by the local bishop, Richard of Subligny, brother of the founder. Tancred died shortly afterward in June of that year.

This location, however, proved to be too remote and damp for the community to thrive. By that time, the community had become an independent abbey. Led by its first abbot, Tescelin, the canons chose to relocate to the other end of the valley.

The foundation stone of the permanent buildings at the new site was laid in 1164 by Achard of St. Victor, who was later buried here. Construction lasted from 1164 to 1178 and was in the Romanesque style, in the restrained and sober manner of Cistercian architecture, except that the complex was dominated by an Anglo-Norman Gothic tower.

La Lucerne grew to become the motherhouse of four other Premonstratensian monasteries: Ardenne Abbey, Mondaye Abbey and Belle-Étoile Abbey (at Cerisy-Belle-Étoile) in Normandy, and Beauport Abbey in Brittany.

Major structural renovations were carried out in the 15th and 17th centuries.

During the French Revolution, in 1792, the abbey was suppressed. Its buildings were at first turned into a cotton mill and then used as a source of stone.

== Reconstruction ==
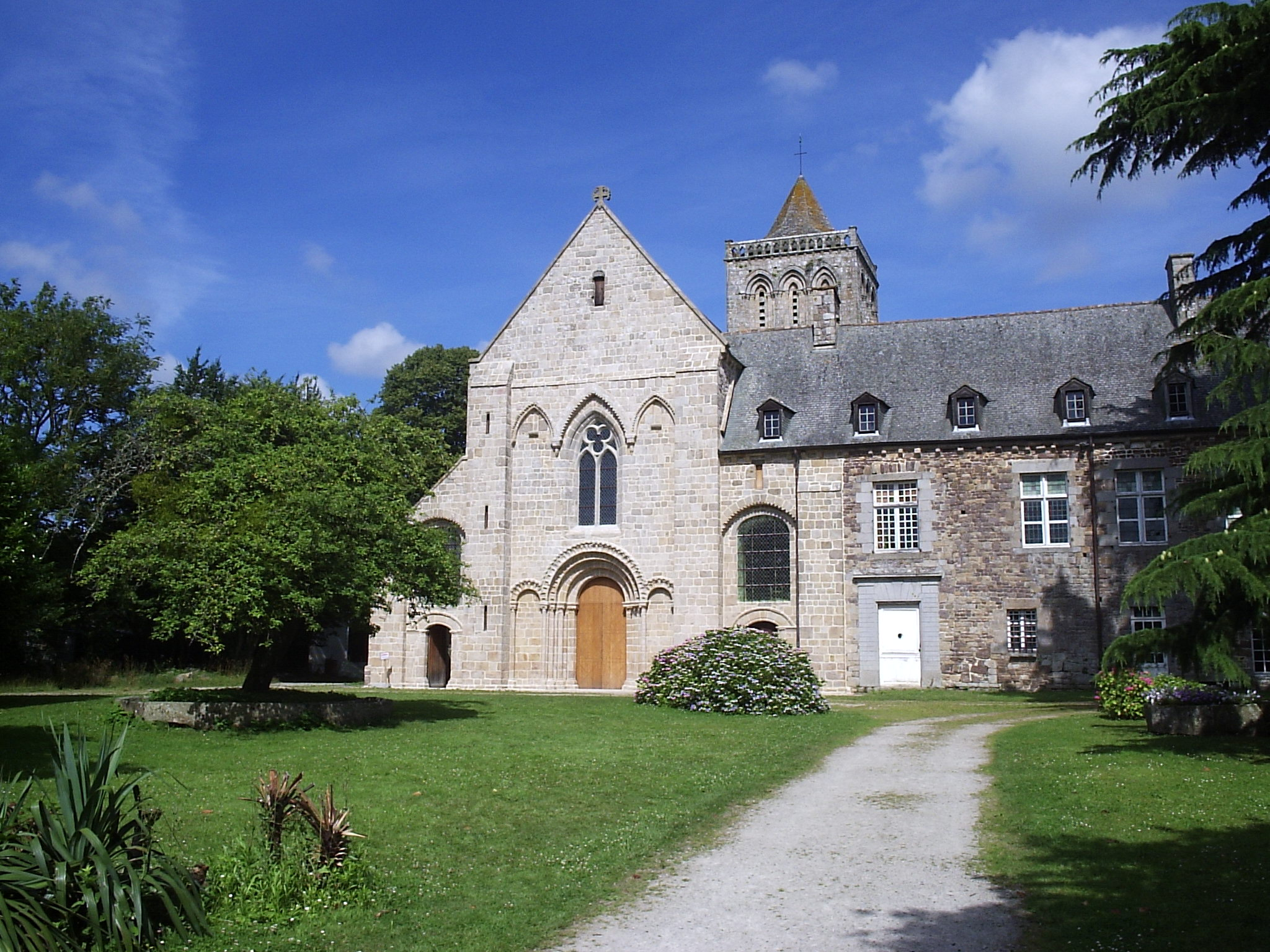
La Lucerne Abbey

The ruins were classed as a monument historique in 1928.

In 1959, under the aegis of Abbé Marcel Lelégard (1925-94), the enormous task was begun, which still continues under the "Fondation Abbaye de La Lucerne d'Outremer", of the restoration of the abbey. The first phase of the work was the reconstruction of the abbey church, particularly the ogival crossing vaults and the west front with its Romanesque portal, continuing to the refectory and cellars.

Work has continued since then and the tithe barn, the Romanesque lavatorium (the only one in Normandy), the medieval gatehouse (with its bakery and courtrooms), the dovecote, the park, the 18th century abbot's lodgings and the ponds are all now restored. The chapel of Blessed Achard is in the process of restoration.

One of the aims of the "Fondation Abbaye de La Lucerne d'Outremer" has been to re-establish a monastic community at La Lucerne, and the abbey is still being rebuilt with that intention.

== Gallery ==
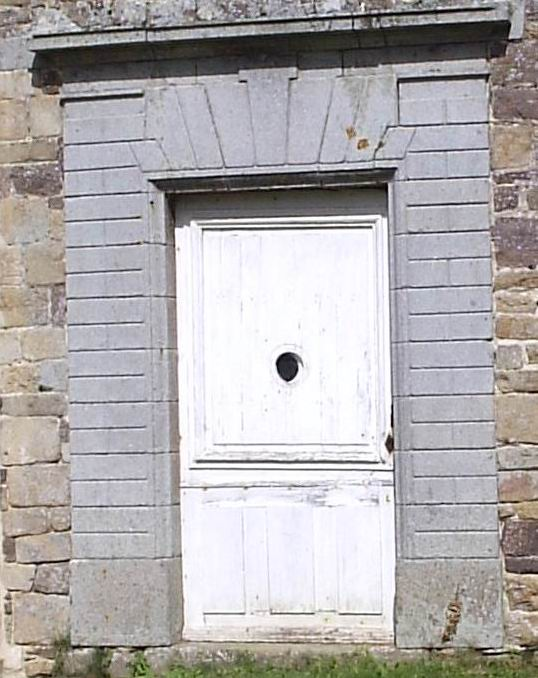
Blue granite gate to the abbey

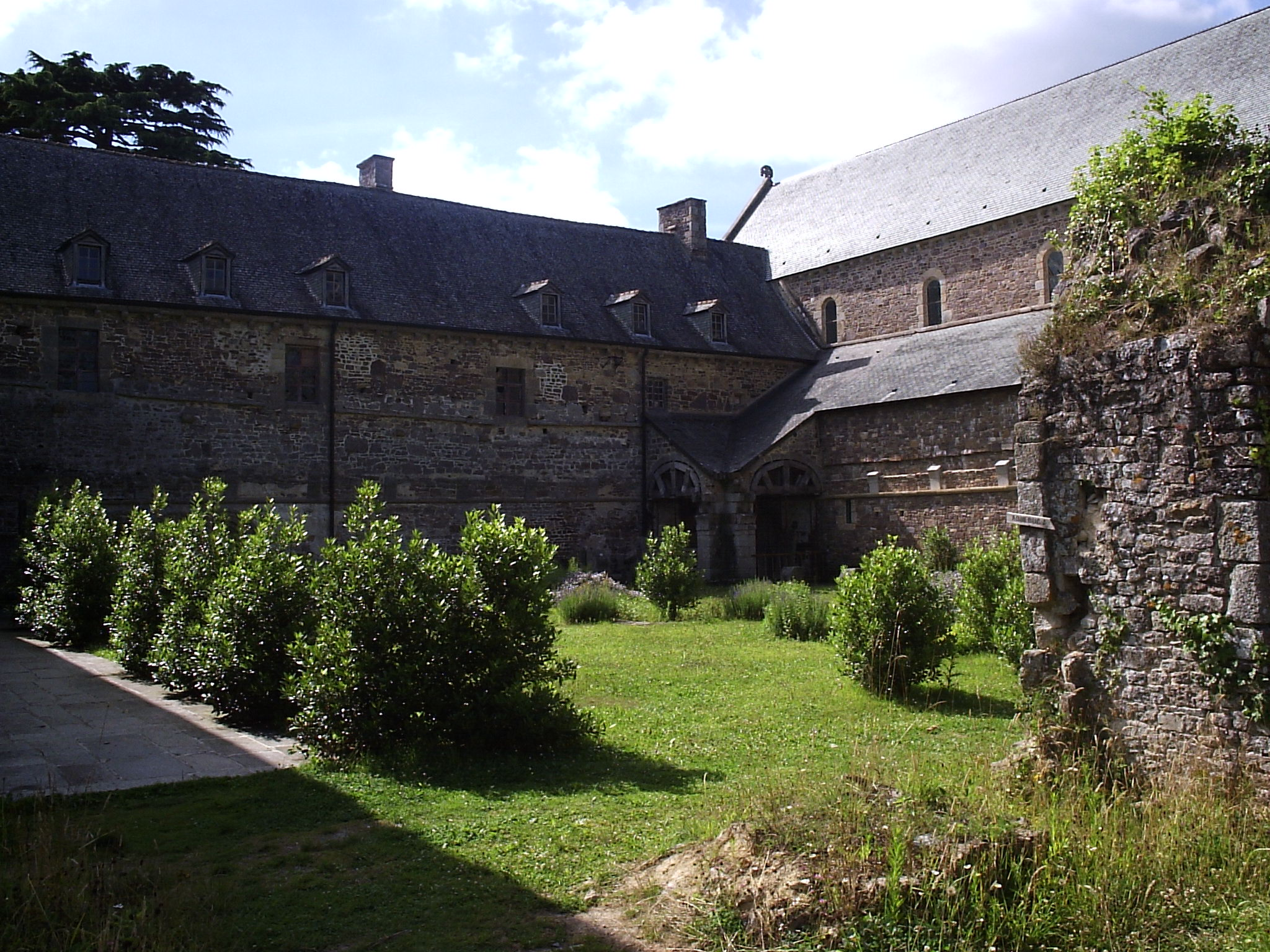
Abbey cloister

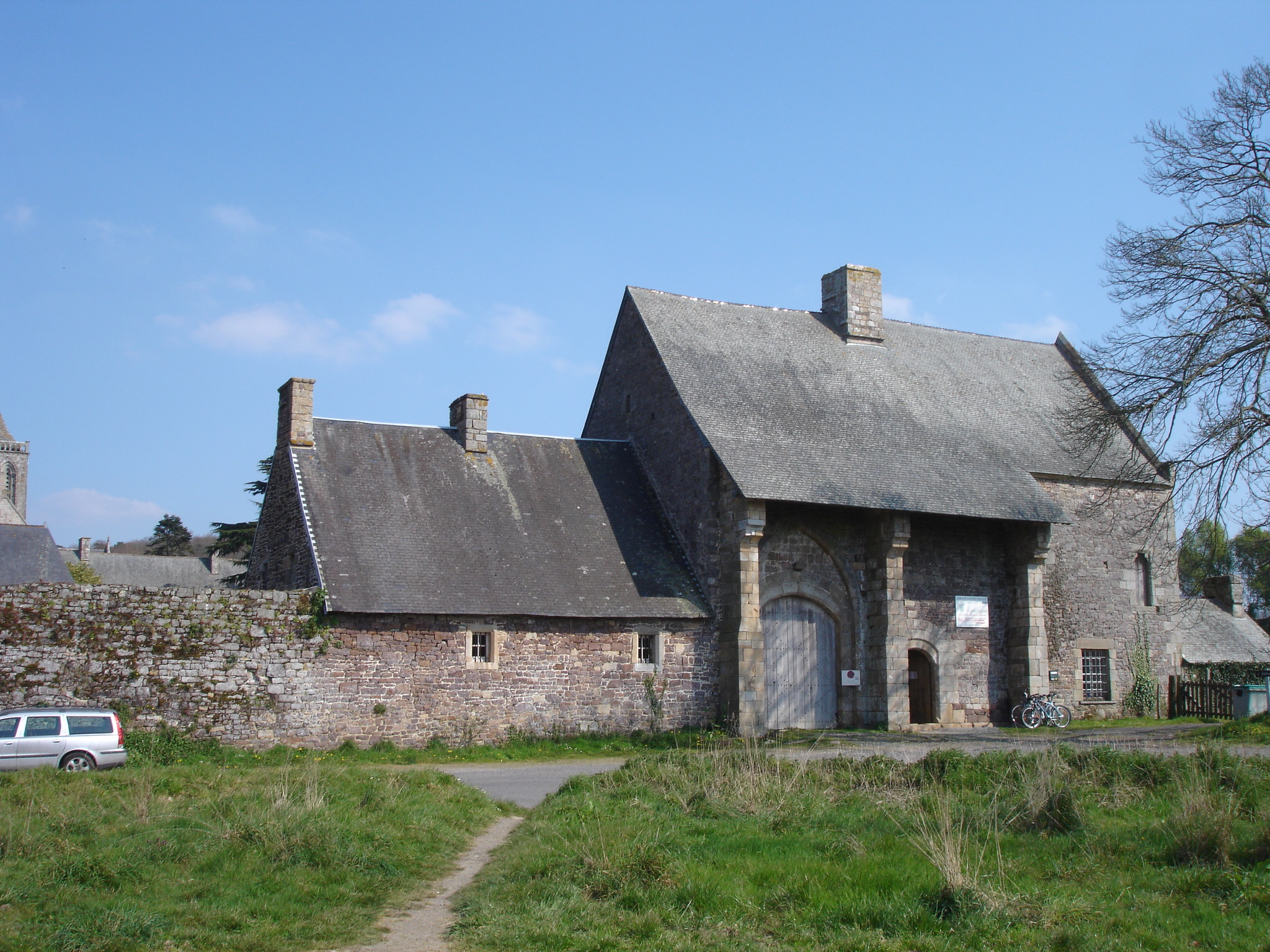
Abbey entrance

== Sources ==
- Website of the Abbaye de La Lucerne (in French)
