= Microcosm–macrocosm analogy =

Analogy between man and cosmos

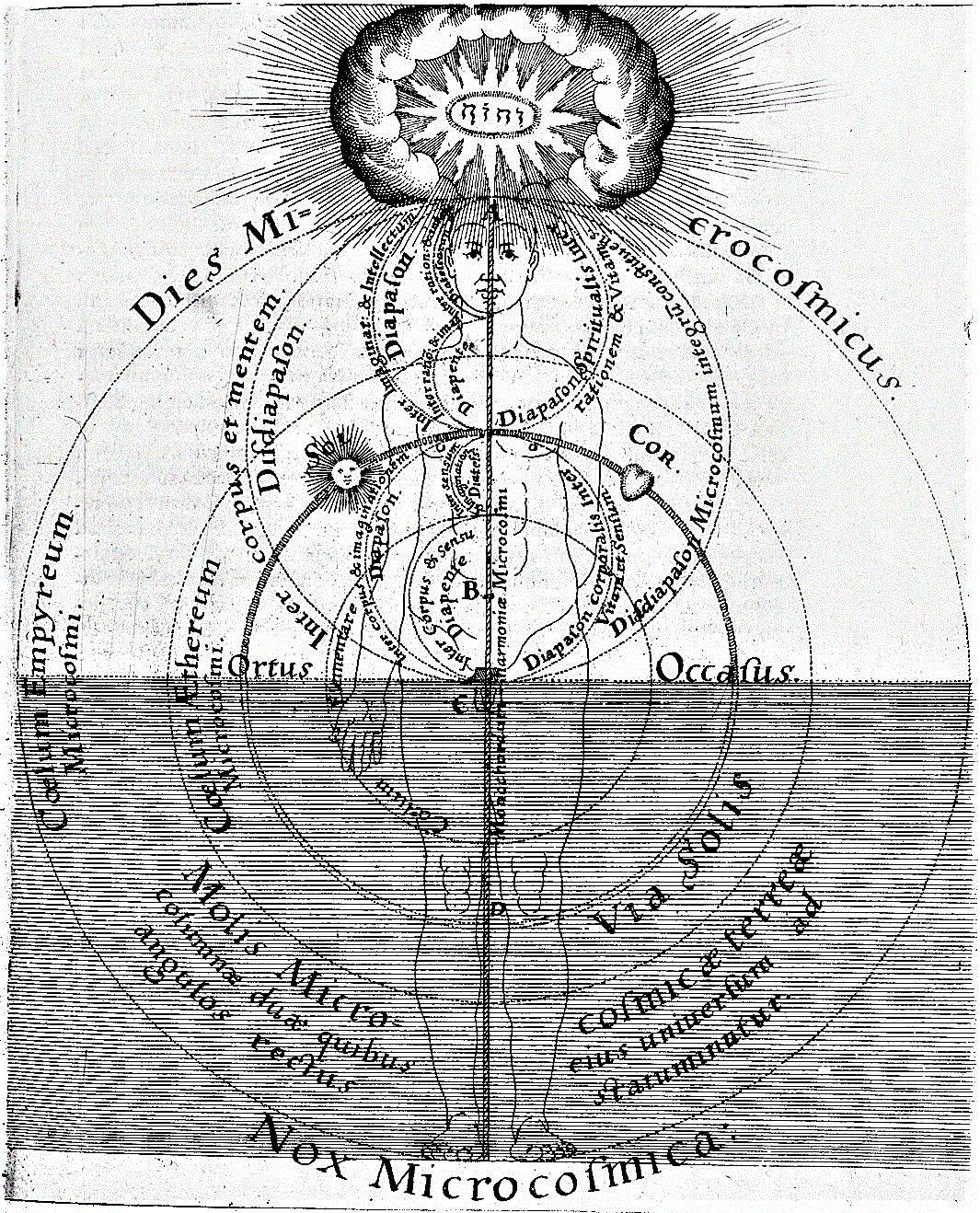
Illustration of the analogy between the human body and a geocentric cosmos: the head is analogous to the cœlum empyreum, closest to the divine light of God; the chest to the cœlum æthereum, occupied by the classical planets (wherein the heart is analogous to the sun); the abdomen to the sublunary sphere (cœlum elementare); the legs to the dark earthy mass (molis terreæ) which supports this universe. (Note: From Robert Fludd's Utriusque cosmi maioris scilicet et minoris metaphysica, physica atque technica historia, 1617–21)

The microcosm–macrocosm analogy (or, equivalently, macrocosm–microcosm analogy) refers to a historical view that posited a structural similarity between the human being (the microcosm, i.e., the small order or the small universe) and the cosmos as a whole (the macrocosm, i.e., the great order or the great universe). (Note: The terms microcosm and macrocosm derive from ancient Greek μικρὸς κόσμος (mikròs kósmos) and μακρὸς κόσμος (makròs kósmos), which may mean 'small universe' and 'great universe', but whose primary meaning is 'small order' and 'great order', respectively (see wiktionary; cf. Allers 1944, pp. 320–321, note 5).) Given this fundamental analogy, truths about the nature of the cosmos as a whole may be inferred from truths about human nature, and vice versa.

One corollary of this view is that the cosmos may be considered alive, and thus to have a mind or soul (the world soul), a position advanced by Plato in his Timaeus. Moreover, this cosmic mind or soul was often thought to be divine, most notably by the Stoics and those who were influenced by them, such as the authors of the Hermetica. Hence, it was sometimes inferred that the human mind or soul was divine in nature as well.

Apart from this important psychological and noetic (i.e., related to the mind) application, the analogy was also applied to human physiology. For example, the cosmological functions of the seven classical planets were sometimes taken to be analogous to the physiological functions of human organs, such as the heart, the spleen, the liver, the stomach, etc. (Note: See the illustration shown on the right (from Robert Fludd's Utriusque cosmi maioris scilicet et minoris metaphysica, physica atque technica historia, 1617–21), which correlates the sun (considered to be a planet in the geocentric model) with the heart.)

The view itself is ancient and may be found in many philosophical systems worldwide (for example, in ancient Mesopotamia, in ancient Iran, or in ancient Chinese philosophy). However, the terms microcosm and macrocosm refer more specifically to the analogy as it was developed in ancient Greek philosophy and its medieval and early modern descendants. In contemporary usage, the terms microcosm and macrocosm are also employed to refer to any smaller system that is representative of a larger one, and vice versa.

== History ==
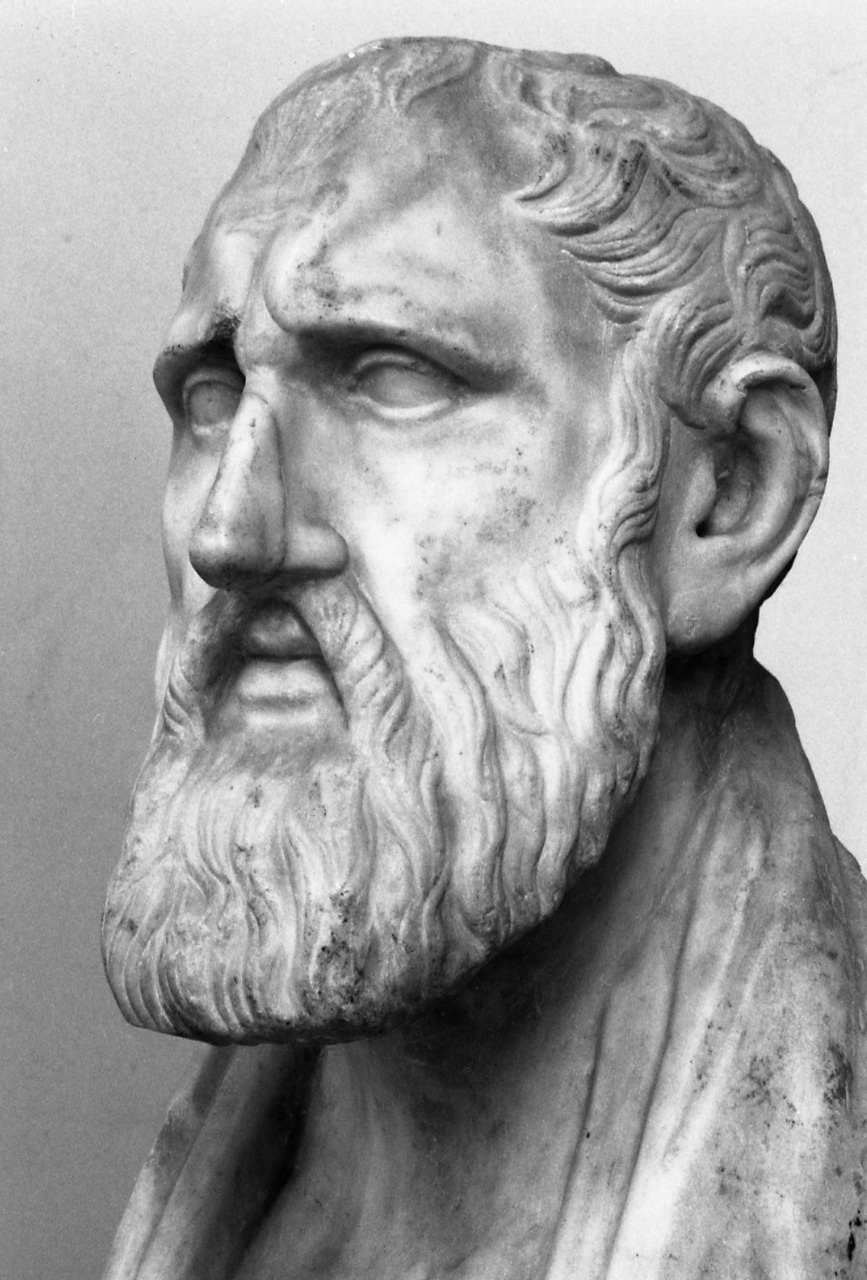
Zeno of Citium (c. 334–262 BCE), founder of the Stoic school of philosophy.

=== Antiquity ===
Among ancient Greek and Hellenistic philosophers, notable proponents of the microcosm–macrocosm analogy included Anaximander (c. 610 – c. 546 BCE), Plato (c. 428 or 424 – c. 348 BCE), the Hippocratic authors (late 5th or early 4th century BCE and onwards), and the Stoics (3rd century BCE and onwards). In later periods, the analogy was especially prominent in the works of those philosophers who were heavily influenced by Platonic and Stoic thought, such as Philo of Alexandria (c. 20 BCE – c. 50 CE), the authors of the early Greek Hermetica (c. 100 BCE–300 CE), and the Neoplatonists (3rd century CE and onwards). The analogy was also employed in late antique and early medieval religious literature, such as in the Bundahishn, a Zoroastrian encyclopedic work, and the Avot de-Rabbi Nathan, a Jewish Rabbinical text.

=== Middle Ages ===
Medieval philosophy was generally dominated by Aristotle, who – despite having been the first to coin the term "microcosm" – had posited a fundamental and insurmountable difference between the region below the Moon (the sublunary world, consisting of the four elements) and the region above the Moon (the superlunary world, consisting of a fifth element). Nevertheless, the microcosm–macrocosm analogy was adopted by a wide variety of medieval thinkers working in different linguistic traditions: the concept of microcosm was known in Arabic as ʿālam ṣaghīr, in Hebrew as olam katan, and in Latin as microcosmus or minor mundus. The analogy was elaborated by alchemists such as those writing under the name of Jabir ibn Hayyan (c. 850–950 CE), by the anonymous Shi'ite philosophers known as the Ikhwān al-Ṣafāʾ ("The Brethren of Purity", c. 900–1000), by Jewish theologians and philosophers such as Isaac Israeli (c. 832 – c. 932), Saadia Gaon (882/892–942), Ibn Gabirol (11th century), and Judah Halevi (c. 1075–1141), by Victorine monks such as Godfrey of Saint Victor (born 1125, author of a treatise called Microcosmus), by the Andalusian mystic Ibn Arabi (1165–1240), by the German cardinal Nicholas of Cusa (1401–1464), and by numerous others.

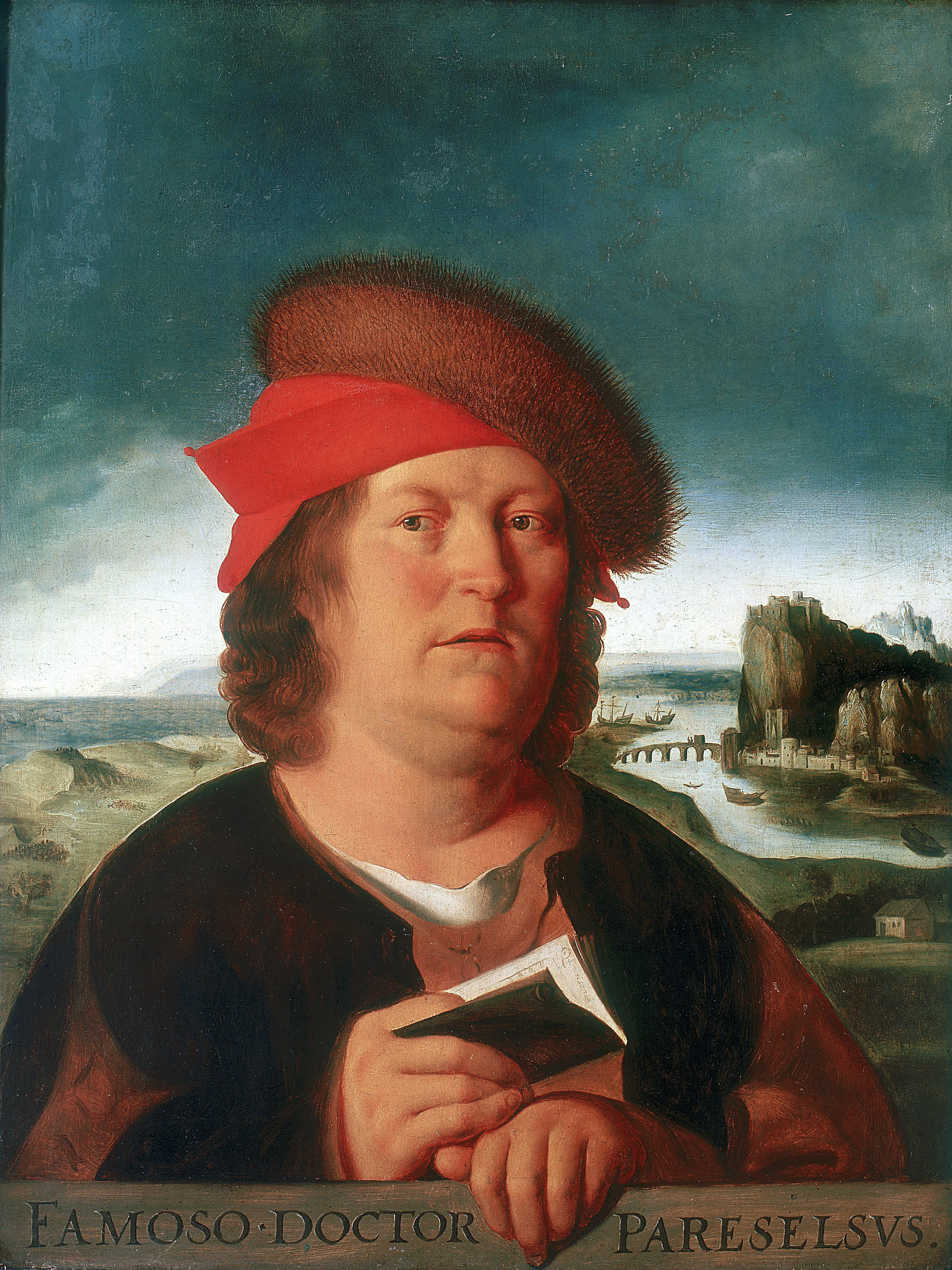
Paracelsus (1494–1541)

=== Renaissance ===
The revival of Hermeticism and Neoplatonism in the Renaissance, both of which had reserved a prominent place for the microcosm–macrocosm analogy, also led to a marked rise in popularity of the latter. Some of the most notable proponents of the concept in this period include Marsilio Ficino (1433 – 1499), Heinrich Cornelius Agrippa (1486–1535), Francesco Patrizi (1529–1597), Giordano Bruno (1548–1600), and Tommaso Campanella (1568–1639). It was also central to the new medical theories propounded by the Swiss physician Paracelsus (1494–1541) and his many followers, most notably Robert Fludd (1574–1637). Andreas Vesalius (1514–1564) in his anatomy text De fabrica wrote that the human body "in many respects corresponds admirably to the universe and for that reason was called the little universe by the ancients."

== In Judaism ==
Analogies between microcosm and macrocosm are found throughout the history of Jewish philosophy. According to this analogy, there is a structural similarity between the human being (the microcosm, from Koine Greek: μικρὸς κόσμος, romanized: mikròs kósmos, Hebrew: עולם קטן, romanized: ʻolam qāṭān, lit. 'small universe') and the cosmos as a whole (the macrocosm, from Koine Greek: μακρὸς κόσμος, romanized: makròs kósmos, lit. 'great universe').

The view was elaborated by the Jewish philosopher Philo (c. 20 BCE–50 CE), who adopted it from Hellenistic philosophy. Similar ideas can also be found in early rabbinical literature. In the Middle Ages, the analogy became a prominent theme in the works of most Jewish philosophers.

=== Rabbinical literature ===
In the Avot de-Rabbi Natan (compiled c. 700–900), human parts are compared with parts belonging to the larger world: the hair is like a forest, the lungs like the wind, the loins like counsellors, the stomach like a mill, etc.

=== Middle Ages ===
The microcosm–macrocosm analogy was a common theme among medieval Jewish philosophers, just as it was among the Arabic philosophers who were their peers. Especially influential concerning the microcosm–macrocosm analogy were the Epistles of the Brethren of Purity, an encyclopedic work written in the 10th century by an anonymous group of Shi'i Muslim philosophers. Having been brought to al-Andalus at an early date by the hadith scholar and alchemist Maslama al-Majriti of the Umayyad state of Córdoba (died 964), the Epistles were of central importance to Sephardic philosophers such as Bahya ibn Paquda (c. 1050–1120), Judah Halevi (c. 1075–1141), Joseph ibn Tzaddik (died 1149), and Abraham ibn Ezra (c. 1090–1165).

Nevertheless, the analogy was already in use by earlier Jewish philosophers. In his commentary on the Sefer Yetzirah ("Book of Creation"), Saadia Gaon (882/892–942) put forward a set of analogies between the cosmos, the Tabernacle, and the human being. Saadia was followed in this by a number of later authors, such as Bahya ibn Paquda, Judah Halevi, and Abraham ibn Ezra.

Whereas the physiological application of the analogy in the rabbinical work Avot de-Rabbi Natan had still been relatively simple and crude, much more elaborate versions of this application were given by Bahya ibn Paquda and Joseph ibn Tzaddik (in his Sefer ha-Olam ha-Katan, "Book of the Microcosm"), both of whom compared human parts with the heavenly bodies and other parts of the cosmos at large.

The analogy was linked to the ancient theme of "know thyself" (Greek: γνῶθι σεαυτόν, gnōthi seauton) by the physician and philosopher Isaac Israeli (c. 832–932), who suggested that by knowing oneself, a human being may gain knowledge of all things. This theme of self-knowledge returned in the works of Joseph ibn Tzaddik, who added that in this way humans may come to know God himself. The macrocosm was also associated with the divine by Judah Halevi, who saw God as the spirit, soul, mind, and life that animates the universe, while according to Maimonides (1138–1204), the relationship between God and the universe is analogous to the relationship between the intellect and the human being.

== See also ==
- As above, so below
- Axis mundi
- Correspondence
- Great chain of being (Scala naturae)
- Hermeticism
- Macranthropy
- Panpsychism
- Paracelsus and microcosm-macrocosm
- Psychophysical parallelism
- Robert Fludd and microcosm–macrocosm
- Stoic cosmology and psychology
- Plato's Timaeus
- Weltgeist
- World soul (Anima mundi)

== Bibliography ==
=== General overviews ===
The following works contain general overviews of the microcosm–macrocosm analogy:

- Allers, Rudolf (1944). "Microcosmus: From Anaximandros to Paracelsus". Traditio. 2: 319–407. doi:10.1017/S0362152900017219. JSTOR 27830052. S2CID 149312818.
- Barkan, Leonard (1975). Nature's Work of Art: The Human Body as Image of the World. London/New Haven: Yale University Press. ISBN 978-0300016949.
- Conger, George Perrigo (1922). Theories of Macrocosms and Microcosms in the History of Philosophy. New York: Columbia University Press. ISBN 978-1290429832.
- Jacobs, Joseph; Broydé, Isaac (1906). "Microcosm". In Singer, Isidore; Funk, Isaac K.; Vizetelly, Frank H. (eds.). Jewish Encyclopedia. Vol. 8. New York: Funk & Wagnalls. pp. 544–545.
- Kraemer, Joel (2007). "Microcosm". In Berenbaum, Michael; Skolnik, Fred (eds.). Encyclopaedia Judaica. Vol. 14 (2nd ed.). Detroit: Macmillan Reference. pp. 178–179. ISBN 978-0-02-866097-4.

=== Other sources cited ===
- Aminrazavi, Mehdi (2009–2021). "Mysticism in Arabic and Islamic Philosophy". In Zalta, Edward N. (ed.). The Stanford Encyclopedia of Philosophy (Spring 2021 Edition).
- De Callataÿ, Godefroid; Moureau, Sébastien (2017). "A Milestone in the History of Andalusī Bāṭinism: Maslama b. Qāsim al-Qurṭubī's Riḥla in the East". Intellectual History of the Islamicate World. 5 (1): 86–117. doi:10.1163/2212943X-00501004. hdl:2078.1/167526.
- Debus, Allen G. (1965). The English Paracelsians. London: Oldbourne. ISBN 978-0444999610.
- Duchesne-Guillemin, Jacques (1956). "Persische weisheit in griechischem gewande?". Harvard Theological Review (in German). 49 (2): 115–122. doi:10.1017/S0017816000028169. JSTOR 1508803. S2CID 164108095.
- Festugière, André-Jean (1944–1954). La Révélation d'Hermès Trismégiste. Vol. I–IV (in French). Paris: Gabalda. ISBN 978-2251326740.
- Finckh, Ruth (1999). Minor Mundus Homo: Studien zur Mikrokosmos-Idee in der mittelalterlichen Literatur (in German). Göttingen: Vandenhoeck & Ruprecht. ISBN 3525205791.
- Götze, Albrecht (1923). "Persische Weisheit in griechischem Gewande: Ein Beitrag zur Geschichte der Mikrokosmos-Idee". Zeitschrift für Indologie und Iranistik (in German). 2: 60–98, 167–177.
- Hahm, David E. (1977). The Origins of Stoic Cosmology. Columbus: Ohio State University Press. ISBN 978-0814202531.
- Kranz, Walther (1938). "Kosmos und Mensch in der Vorstellung frühen Griechentums". Nachrichten von der Gesellschaft der Wissenschaften zu Göttingen, Philologisch-historische Klasse (in German). 2 (7): 121–161. OCLC 905422149.
- Kraus, Paul (1942–1943). Jâbir ibn Hayyân: Contribution à l'histoire des idées scientifiques dans l'Islam. I. Le corpus des écrits jâbiriens. II. Jâbir et la science grecque (in French). Cairo: Institut Français d'Archéologie Orientale. ISBN 978-3487091150. OCLC 468740510.
- Krinis, Ehud (2016). "The Philosophical and Theosophical Interpretations of the Microcosm–Macrocosm Analogy in Ikhwān al-ṣafā' and Jewish Medieval Writings". In Amir-Moezzi, Mohammad Ali; De Cillis, Maria; De Smet, Daniel; Mir-Kasimov, Orkhan (eds.). L'Ésotérisme shi'ite, ses racines et ses prolongements – Shi'i Esotericism: Its Roots and Developments. Bibliothèque de l'Ecole des Hautes Etudes, Sciences Religieuses. Vol. 177. Turnhout: Brepols. pp. 395–409. doi:10.1484/M.BEHE-EB.4.01178. ISBN 978-2503568744.
- Miller, Clyde Lee (2009–2017). "Cusanus, Nicolaus [Nicolas of Cusa]". In Zalta, Edward N. (ed.). The Stanford Encyclopedia of Philosophy (Summer 2017 Edition).
- Nokso-Koivisto, Inka (2014). Microcosm–Macrocosm Analogy in Rasāʾil Ikhwān aṣ-Ṣafāʾ and Certain Related Texts (Unpubl. PhD diss.). University of Helsinki. hdl:10138/136006.
- Olerud, Anders (1951). L'idée de macrocosmos et de microcosmos dans le 'Timée' de Platon: Étude de mythologie comparée (in French). Uppsala: Almqvist & Wiksell. OCLC 680524865.
- O'Malley, Charles Donald (1964). Andreas Vesalius of Brussels, 1514–1564. Berkeley: University of California Press. ISBN 978-0930405557.
- Raphals, Lisa (2015–2020). "Chinese Philosophy and Chinese Medicine". In Zalta, Edward N. (ed.). The Stanford Encyclopedia of Philosophy (Winter 2020 Edition).
- Runia, David T. (1986). Philo of Alexandria and the Timaeus of Plato. Leiden: Brill. ISBN 978-9004074774.
- Schluderer, Laura Rosella (2018). "Imitating the Cosmos: The Role of Microcosm–Macrocosm Relationships in the Hippocratic Treatise On Regimen". Classical Quarterly. 68 (1): 31–52. doi:10.1017/S0009838818000149.
- Svärd, Saana; Nokso-Koivisto, Inka (2014). "The Microcosm–Macrocosm Analogy in Mesopotamian and Medieval Arabic History of Science". In Lindstedt, Ilkka; Hämeen-Anttila, Jaakko; Mattila, Raija; Rollinger, Robert (eds.). Case Studies in Transmission. The Intellectual Heritage of the Ancient and Mediaeval Near East, 1. Münster: Ugarit-Verlag. pp. 159–187. ISBN 978-3868351248.
- Widengren, G. (1980). "Macrocosmos-microcosmos speculation in the Rasa'il Ikhwan al-safa and some Hurufi texts". Archivio di Filosofia. 48: 297–312.
- Wilberding, James (2006). Plotinus' Cosmology: A Study of Ennead II.1 (40). Text, Translation, and Commentary. Oxford: Oxford University Press. ISBN 978-0199277261.
