= Peter of Poitiers =

Middle section of a scroll of Peter's Compendium Historiae in Genealogia Christi

Peter of Poitiers (Latin: Petrus Pictaviensis) was a French scholastic theologian, born in Poitiers (or in the region) around 1125–1130. He died in Paris on September 3, 1205.

== Life ==
After his studies in Paris, he began teaching in the Faculty of Theology in 1167. Two years later he succeeded Peter Comestor in the chair of scholastic theology at the cathedral school of Notre Dame.

Part of a circle of scholars whose influence led to the foundation of the university and the formation of a theological curriculum based on the teachings of Peter Lombard, Peter of Poitiers helped introduce the technical language and methods of Aristotelian logic to the field of theology. In a text called the Four Labyrinths of France Gauthier de St-Victor famously denounced the dialectical method of scholasticism, naming Peter of Poiters along with Gilbert de la Porrée, Abelard, and Peter Lombard. Peter of Poitiers was also known for teaching biblical history as the basis of scriptural exegesis. For a generation of theologians invested in allegorical interpretation, the exact details of historical events were essential.

In 1193 he succeeded Peter Comestor as chancellor of the cathedral. His death on September 3, 1205, is listed in the necrology of Notre Dame. The necrology calls him a "deacon", indicating that he was never ordained as a priest.

== Writings ==
His main theological work is his collection of sentences, divided into five books, written between 1168 and 1175. He expanded on topics that Peter Lombard had not touched on in his Sentences (above all, ethical subjects). Peter of Poitier's other theological works include Distinctiones super psalterium (before 1196), one of the first of a type of commentary wherein lists of citations from church fathers are interpreted according to the four-fold mode of exegesis (literal, allegorical, analogical, tropological). Another one of his theological works, Allegoriae super tabernaculum Moysi, is an allegorical interpretation of the tabernacle (Ex. 24–40) which uses the precise details of the construction and equipment to show how it prefigures the Church. Peter of Poitiers also produced a collection of fifty-nine sermons. Although the authorship is not certain, a collection of questions as well as glosses on Lombard's sentences can also potentially be attributed to him.

Peter of Poitier's historical writings became standard classroom literature. He wrote the Historia Actuum apostolorum as a continuation of Peter Comestor's Historia scholastica. Summarizing the Acts of the Apostles, it is often transmitted together with the Historia scholastica. By far his most disseminated work, however, is the Compendium historiae in genealogia Christi (ca. 330 manuscripts). Conceived as a representation of biblical history, it shows time as a genealogical chart, starting with Adam and Eve and ending with Christ and the Apostles. Often transmitted on rolls, it is thought to have been used in classrooms in the Middle Ages. It provided the model for a genre of diagrammatic chronicle that survived well into the age of print.
