= Richard of Saint Victor =

Scottish philosopher, died 1173

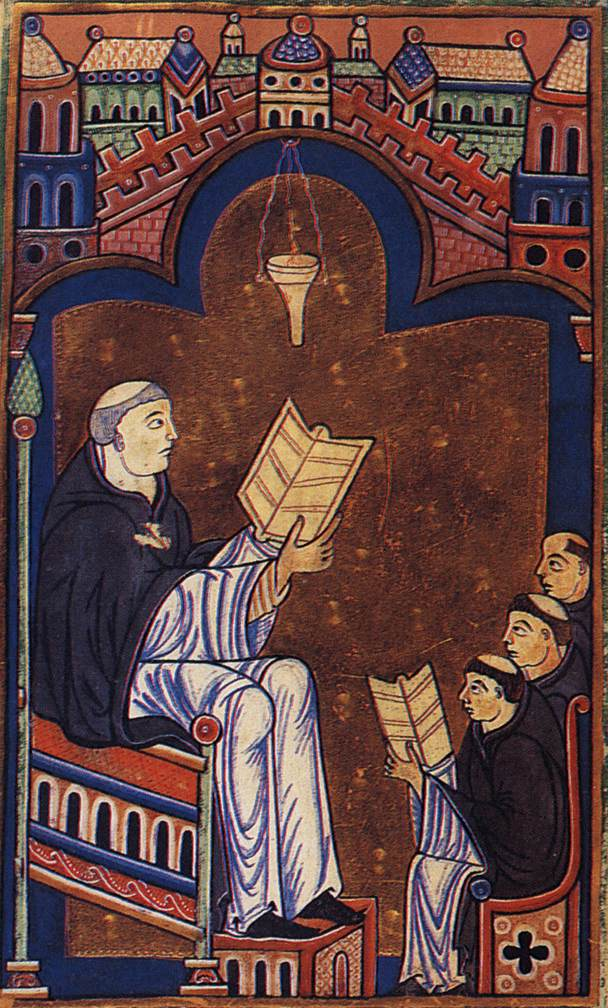
Miniature of Hugh of Saint Victor teaching the young canons of Saint Victor's abbey

Richard of Saint Victor (died 10 March 1173) was a Medieval Scottish philosopher and theologian and one of the most influential religious thinkers of his time. A canon regular, he was a prominent mystical theologian, and was prior of the famous Augustinian Abbey of Saint Victor in Paris from 1162 until his death in 1173.

== Life ==
Very little is known about the origins and upbringing of Richard of Saint Victor. John of Toulouse wrote a short Vita of Richard in the seventeenth century. He said that Richard came from Scotland. John added that Richard was received into the Abbey of St Victor by Abbot Gilduin (1114–1155) and was a student under Hugh of St Victor, the most influential of all Victorine teachers (implying that Richard entered the community before Hugh's death in 1141). This account of Richard's early life is not accepted by all modern scholars, however, and some have suggested that Richard entered the abbey after Hugh's death in 1141.

All scholarship agrees, however, that Richard was a magister during the 1150s, and was then promoted to subprior in 1159 (as stated by a document found at the abbey). He served under Achard of St. Victor's elected successor Ernisius, who was unworthy of the position. Richard's life was then burdened by the frustrations of working under a man who was ill-suited for his responsibilities. Ernisius wasted the abbey's resources on overly ambitious building projects and persecuted those who attempted to resist him. Richard was allowed to keep his office but his influence was restricted. Things became so unbearable that an appeal was made to the Pope, who then visited Saint Victor in 1162. Through a multitude of transactions, Ernisius was eventually removed from his position and the Pope commended Richard for his continued involvement in the matter. Letters from England written to Richard show that he was in constant touch with English affairs and give evidence of the international character of intellectual life at this time.

He was then promoted to prior in 1162, a position he held until his death on 10 March 1173.

== Writings ==
Richardi Parisiensis Opera (1650)

Richard wrote extensively (Migne's Patrologia Latina contains 34 works attributed to him, and this is not Richard's full corpus). There are some problems with establishing the chronology of Richard's works. The earliest ones come before 1153, and the latest were written one or two years before his death. His earlier works are similar to the general teaching and writing of the period. His writing develops from basic exegesis, theology and philosophy to more of a study of purely spiritual questions. In his early writings he relies on the moral interpretations of previous theologians such as Augustine of Hippo, Bede, Pope Gregory I and Hugh. He later became more independent and strayed from Hugh's influence. There is some debate between historians about which of Richard's texts are the most influential and important. Because Richard's work covers many spheres of thought it is somewhat difficult to categorise his work.

=== The Book of the Twelve Patriarchs, or Benjamin Minor ===
The Book of the Twelve Patriarchs, sometimes titled Benjamin Minor, is one of Richard of Saint Victor's great works on contemplation. It is not exactly known when it was written, but it would seem to date before 1162. Richard specifies that this work is not a treatise on contemplation but rather prepares the mind for contemplation.

=== The Mystical Ark, or Benjamin Major ===
The Mystical Ark, sometimes called Benjamin Major or The Grace of Contemplation completes this with the study of the mind in relation to prayer. However, in the last chapters of Benjamin Major, written later than the Minor, Richard almost abandons his topic and the discussion of the teaching of mystical theology takes up a good portion of every remaining chapter. He is still attempting to instruct his followers on a text but he has also engaged himself in creating a system of mystical theology.

=== De Trinitate ===
One of Richard's greatest works was the De Trinitate which was probably written while Richard was prior, between 1162 and 1173. This is known because it incorporates pieces of theological text which editors are now finding in earlier works. De Trinitate is Richard's most independent and original study on dogmatic theology. It stems from the desire to show that dogmatic truths of Christian revelation are ultimately not against reason. Richard's theological approach stems from a profoundly mystical life of prayer, which in the Spirit seeks to involve the mind, in continuation with the Augustinian and Anselmian tradition.

Since this work was not available in any English translation until recently, its diffusion has been limited and its influence has seldom gone beyond 'Book III'. In 2011, the first full English translation of Richard's De Trinitate was published by Ruben Angelici.

=== Other treatises and works ===
Richard wrote a massive handbook of biblical education entitled Liber Exceptionum (Book of Selections/Book of Notes), important scriptural commentaries, and many treatises.

The Four Degrees of Violent Charity, composed about 1170, with its description of how vehement love leads to union with God and more perfect service of neighbour, has been of interest to writers interested in Christian mysticism.

Richard's other treatises are a number of short works which mainly deal with textual difficulties and theological issues. Many of them can be grouped together with larger works. Some of them are correspondence between Richard and his students while others seem to have been written at the request of friends. Although short, they are often interesting because they allow the modern reader to see the mentality of the students and the discussions and issues of the time.

Richard of Saint Victor's Commentary on Ezekiel is of special interest in the field of art history because the explanations laid out by the author are accompanied by illustrations. A number of copies have come down to us, none of which are dated, but they are written in a style attributable to the second half of the twelfth century.

== Historiographical contributions ==
What makes Richard of Saint-Victor stand out from other theologians of his time is that he approaches theological problems as more of a psychologist, contributing to 'a careful analysis of contemplative experiences.'

== Bibliography ==
=== Translations ===
- Franklin T Harkins and Frans van Liere, eds, Interpretation of scripture: theory. A selection of works of Hugh, Andrew, Richard and Godfrey of St Victor, and of Robert of Melun, (Turnhout, Belgium: Brepols, 2012) [includes translation of selections from The book of notes, and selections from On the Apocalypse of John]
- Hugh Feiss, ed, On love: a selection of works of Hugh, Adam, Achard, Richard and Godfrey of St Victor, (Turnhout: Brepols, 2011) [includes A.B. Kraebel's translation of On the Four Degrees of Violent Love]
- R. Angelici, Richard of Saint Victor: On the Trinity. English Translation and Commentary (Eugene: Cascade, 2011)
- Boyd Taylor Coolman and Dale M Coulter, eds, Trinity and creation: a selection of works of Hugh, Richard and Adam of St Victor. (Turnhout: Brepols, 2010) [includes translation of Richard of St Victor, On the Trinity]
- Richard of St Victor, Twelve Patriarchs, Mystical Ark, Book Three of the Trinity.' Translation and introduction by Grover A. Zinn. Paulist Press, Toronto 1979. xviii + 425pp. [Translations & 50page introduction]
- Richard of St Victor, On the Trinity, Book One, trans. Jonathan Couser. [A translation of Book One of On the Trinity] http://pvspade.com/Logic/docs/StVictor.pdf
- Richard of St Victor, Selected Writings on Contemplation. Translated with an introduction and notes by Clare Kirchberger. (London: Faber and Faber, 1957) [Contains extracts from the Twelve Patriarchs, The Mystical Ark, some notes on the Psalms and the Four Degrees of Charity.]
