= Achard of Saint Victor =

Canon regular and bishop (c. 1100–1171)

Blessed Achard of Saint Victor, C.R.S.A.
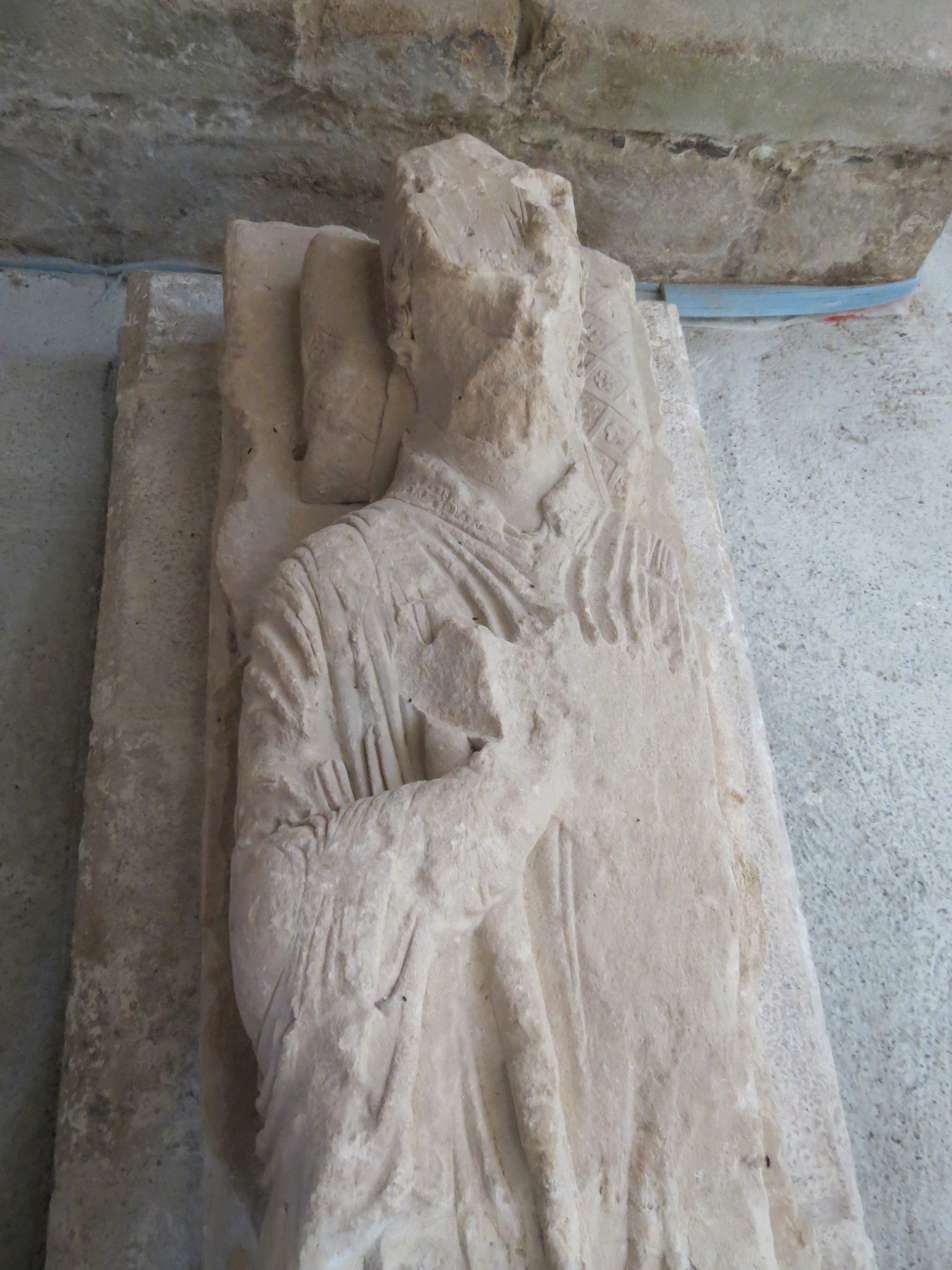
- Effigy of Achard at his tomb at the Abbey of La Lucerne

Religious and Bishop
- Born: c. 1100; Normandy or England
- Residence: Paris (c. 1110–1161), then Avranches, Normandy
- Died: 29 March 1171
- Venerated in: Catholic Church; (Canons Regular of St. Augustine)
- Major shrine: La Lucerne Abbey
- Feast: 29 April
- Attributes: Episcopal vestments and crozier
- Influences: William of Champeaux
- Major works: On the Trinity; De discretione animae, spiritus et mentis; The Treatise on the Seven Deserts

Achard of Saint Victor (c. 1100 – 29 March 1171) was a canon regular and abbot of the Abbey of St. Victor, Paris and later Bishop of Avranches. By tradition, he is honoured as a Blessed by his fellow Canons Regular of St. Augustine.

== Life ==
Achard is thought to have been born in England and educated in France, based on evidence from an early collection of Victorine epitaphs. Another theory is that he came from the noble Norman family of de Pertins of Domfront.

He completed his studies at the monastery school of St. Victor and entered the cloister there. On the death of the first abbot, Gilduin of Saint-Victor (d. 1155), he was elected to fill the vacant post, becoming the second abbot of the abbey (a post he held until 1161) at a time when the royal abbey was almost at the zenith of its glory and power.

In 1157 the cathedral chapter of Sées, composed of canons regular, elected Achard as their bishop, and the choice was duly confirmed by Pope Adrian IV, but Henry II of England intervened and named his personal chaplain, Frogier (or Roger), to the office, thereby vetoing Achard's election. Subsequent relations between Achard and the Plantagenet king were quite cordial, however, with the abbot using (as revealed by a surviving letter from Achard to Henry II) his influence at the English Court to compel the royal treasurer, Richard of Ely, to disburse for the benefit of the poor some moneys which he was unjustly detaining.

In March 1161 Achard was consecrated Bishop of Avranches. Henry made no objection to his consecration, and later that same year Bishop Achard stood as godfather to Henry's daughter, Eleanor, born at Domfront. However, the French king, Louis VII, was by no means pleased to see such a shining light of the Parisian church pass over into Norman territory, as is evident from a letter he then addressed to the prior of St. Victor's. In 1163 Achard was in England assisting at the solemn translation of Edward the Confessor in Westminster Abbey.

He was a generous patron of the Premonstratensian La Lucerne Abbey, in the diocese of Avranches (the foundation stone of which he laid in 1164), in which his tomb and a fine, though damaged, contemporary effigy can still be seen. He was buried with the simple inscription Hic jacet Achardus episcopus cujus caritate ditata est paupertas nostra.

His brethren of St. Victor's celebrated his memory in the following lines:

Hujus oliva domus, Anglorum gloria cleri
Jam dignus celesti luce foveri
Felix Achardus florens etate senile
Presul Abrincensis ex hoc signature ovili.

Not the least gem in Achard's crown is the memory of his unwavering friendship for Thomas Becket through the years. In the chronicles of St. Victor's, Achard is termed "Blessed".

== Works ==
One treatise (Latin original and 18th-century French translation) of Achard's is extant in the Bibliothèque Nationale. It is a long commentary or sermon on the Temptation of Christ in the wilderness, and in it Achard discusses seven degrees of self-renunciation, which he calls the seven deserts of the soul. Barthélemy Hauréau in his Histoire littéraire du Maine, I, quotes several passages.

- Fragments of his dogmatic treatise The Trinity survive. These are edited in André Combes, Un inédit de Saint Anselme? Le traité 'De unitate divinae essentiae et pluralitate creaturarum' d’après Jean de Ripa, (Paris: Vrin, 1944), with supplements by M-T d’Alverny, 'Notes 2. Achard de Saint-Victor. De Trinitate-De unitate et pluralitate creaturarum', Recherches de théologie ancienne et medieval 21, (1954), 299–306
- De discretione animae, spiritus et mentis (The Discrimination of Soul, Spirit and Mind) is often attributed to Achard. This is translated in Nicholas M. Haring, 'Gilbert of Poitiers, Author of the De discretione animae, spiritus et mentis commonly attributed to Achard of Saint-Victor', Mediaeval Studies 22, (1960), 148–191
- Fifteen sermons by Achard survive. The last of these is really a mystical tract, sometimes entitled The Treatise on the Seven Deserts. They are reproduced in PL196:1381–1382. A French translation exists in Jean Chatillon, ed, Achard de Saint-Victor: sermons inédits, (Paris: J Vrin, 1970)

== Translations ==
- Hugh Feiss, ed, On love: a selection of works of Hugh, Adam, Achard, Richard and Godfrey of St Victor, (Turnhout: Brepols, 2011) [includes translation of Sermon Five: On the Sunday of the Palm Branches]
- Hugh Feiss, ed, Achard of Saint Victor: Works, (Kalamazoo, MI: Cistercian Publications, 2001)
