= Walter of Saint Victor =

12th-century prior and polemicist

Walter of Saint Victor (d. c. 1180) was a mystic philosopher and theologian, and an Augustinian canon of Paris.

Nothing is known about Walter except that, in about the year 1175, he was prior of St. Victor's Abbey, Paris; that about the time of the Third Lateran Council (1179) he wrote the celebrated polemic, Contra quatuor labyrinthos Franciae; and that he died about the year 1180.

== Works ==
César-Egasse du Boulay in his "Hist. Univ. Paris." (1665) first called attention to Walter's treatise Contra quatuor labyrinthos Franciae (Against the Four Labyrinths of France) and published excerpts from it.

The "four labyrinths" against whom the work is directed are four of the major masters of early scholastic thought: Abelard, Gilbert de la Porrée, Peter Lombard, and Peter of Poitiers. It is a bitter attack on the dialectical method in theology, and condemns the use of logic in the elucidation of the mysteries of faith.

Walter is indignant at the thought of treating the mysteries of the Trinity and the Incarnation "with scholastic levity". Discarding the best traditions of the School of St-Victor, he pours abuse on the philosophers, the theologians, and even the grammarians. "Thy grammar be with thee until perdition", he cries. This violence, however, defeated his purpose, which was to discredit the dialecticians.

Not only did he fail to convince his contemporaries, but he very probably hastened the triumph of the method which he attacked. Four years after his polemic was published, Peter of Poitiers, one of the "labyrinths", was raised by the pope to the dignity of Chancellor of the Diocese of Paris, and before the end of the decade Peter Lombard, another of the "Labyrinths", was recognized as an authority in theology, his method adopted in the schools, and his famous Books of Sentences used as a text and commented on by all the great teachers — a distinction which it retained all through the thirteenth century.

Some of Walter's sermons also survive.

== On suicide ==
He has been credited with coining the term suicide (as the Latin suicida).

== Notes ==
Herbermann, Charles, ed. (1913). "Walter of St-Victor" . Catholic Encyclopedia. New York: Robert Appleton Company.
