= Richard C. Rudolph =

American professor of Chinese literature (1909 - 2003)

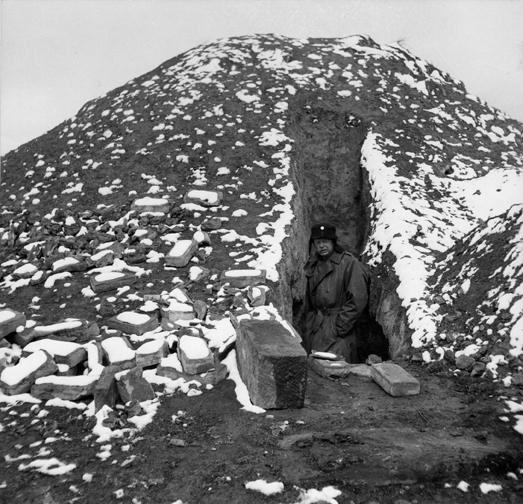
- Rudolph in Xining in 1949
- Born: Richard Casper Rudolph; May 21, 1909
- Died: April 9, 2003 (aged 93); Los Angeles, California
- Occupation: Professor
- Spouse: Mary Alice Potter

Academic background
- Education: UC Berkeley
- Thesis: Wu Tzŭ-hsü, His Life and Posthumous Cult: A Critical Study of Shih Chi 66 (1942)

Academic work
- Institutions: University of California, Los Angeles

Richard Casper Rudolph; (May 21, 1909 - April 9, 2003) was an American professor of Chinese Literature and Archaeology at the University of California, Los Angeles. According to Lothar von Falkenhausen, "He was one of the first generation of serious China scholars trained in the United States."

== Early life and education ==
Rudolph was born in San Francisco three years after the 1906 earthquake that devastated the city. He developed a deep interest in China as a child. He was raised by his grandmother in poverty, living at one point in a water tower and then later in a dirt walled basement as he worked his way through his university education, which took him 14 years.

He received his BA in Foreign Trade in 1932, his MA in 1936, and his PhD in Chinese literature in 1942, all at UC Berkeley. He studied with sinologists Ferdinand Lessing and Peter Boodberg at Berkeley.

== Career ==
Rudolph was an instructor of Chinese at the University of Chicago from 1937 to 1940, working under Herrlee G. Creel. With Creel and Chang Tsung-Ch'ien, he co-authored the three volume textbook Literary Chinese by the Inductive Method, published in 1938, 1939 and 1952 by the University of Chicago Press.

During World War II, Rudolph headed the Chinese language section of the U.S. Navy Language School at the University of Colorado Boulder from 1943 to 1945, where he worked with Ensho Ashikaga and Y. C. Chu who would later come to UCLA.

From 1945 to 1947, he served as assistant professor of Chinese studies at the University of Toronto and also acting director of and assistant keeper of Far Eastern Antiquities at the Royal Ontario Museum of Archaeology. That experience instilled in him an interest in ancient books, calligraphy, paintings, and artifacts. Offered his choice in 1947 of either a position at UC Berkeley or the opportunity to found a new department of Oriental Languages at UCLA, he chose the latter and remained at UCLA throughout his remainder of his career.

After coming to UCLA, Rudolph was awarded a Fulbright Program scholarship for research in China during the culminating years of its revolution. Rudolph's first trip to China was in 1948–49, just before the country largely closed to outsiders as a result of the Communist Revolution. Rudolph was in China during a time of political chaos during the final months of the Chinese Civil War. He visited various big cities such as Beijing and Chengdu, avoiding the fighting between the Communist and Nationalist armies. After the Communists took control of the large cities, Rudolph went through bookstores, purchasing a large number of old woodblock printed reference works. He left China in June 1949, stopping in Japan on his way home for additional book purchases.

His second trip in 1973 was as part of the first group of American scholars to enter China just before the normalization of relations.

He was fluent in Classical Chinese, Mandarin, Manchu, Mongolian, Classical Japanese, modern Japanese, German, French, Italian and Spanish and had begun learning Tibetan and Russian.

When he first arrived at UCLA, the university library possessed only a single volume in Chinese, a telephone directory. By the end of that research year, it had 10,000—some of them rare, many of them important, all of them needed—the core of a functioning research library that is currently among the top ten East Asian libraries in the U.S. (today named the Richard C. Rudolph East Asian Library). As of its 75th anniversary in 2024, the Rudolph Library held over 800,000 books and other items.

He enjoyed examining rare books, manuscripts or works by Chinese calligraphers, and also loved sharing his latest finds with others. He was widely known among the campus librarians as well as with his fellow scholars.

Rudolph was best known for his work on the tomb reliefs of the Western Han (Han Tomb Art of West China). He also worked on a wide range of interests including the history of Chinese printing (A Chinese Printing Manual), ancient Chinese archaeology, ancient Chinese historiography, literature, bronzes, tomb objects, tomb iconography, the salt industry, botanical works, medicine, riddles and games, the application of carbon dating to ancient Chinese artifacts, Chinese porcelain in Mexico, early (14th century) Italians in China, Manchu studies, Japanese maps, and the work in Japan of the Swedish naturalist and physician Carl Peter Thunberg in 1775 and 1776. One of the few Western scholars at the time who kept systematically abreast of ongoing archaeological efforts in China, he was asked to direct the American Council of Learned Societies' project “Abstracts of Chinese Archaeology” from 1968 to 1973.

Before his retirement in 1976, he served as departmental chair for sixteen years and sat on several editorial boards. He was awarded two Guggenheim fellowships (plus one renewal), two Fulbright fellowships (plus one renewal), a Fulbright Distinguished Senior Scholar Award, two American Philosophical Society Grants, a University of California Humanities Institute Award, a Ford Foundation Grant, and an ACLS fellowship. But the honor that he was most proud of was when, in 1981, the UCLA Oriental Library was renamed the Richard C. Rudolph Oriental Library in acknowledgment of his efforts in building the collection. The name was changed to the Richard C. Rudolph East Asian Library in 1990.

After retiring, Rudolph took up the direction of the University of California Education Abroad Program and continued his research. He became increasingly absorbed with collecting ancient maps, paintings, printing blocks, manuscripts, rare books and porcelain, focusing especially on Chinese and Japanese printing, medicine, botany, physiology, and the reception of Western science by the East. Failing eyesight became a problem for him, as did a variety of life-threatening but largely passing ailments.

== Personal life ==
He met Mary Alice Potter at the University of Colorado Boulder, and they were married for 59 years. They had three children, Richard C. Rudolph Jr., Conrad Rudolph, and Deborah Rudolph.

== Publications ==
A great part of this list is based on the article "A List of Publications of Richard C. Rudolph up to 1978".

=== 1938 ===
- Tsung-Ch’ien, C., & Rudolph, R. C. (1938). Literary Chinese by the Inductive Method: Vol. I. The Hsiao Ching. (H. Glessner Creel, Ed.). University of Chicago Press.

=== 1939 ===
- Tsung-Ch’ien, C., & Rudolph, R. C. (1939). Literary Chinese by the Inductive Method: Vol. II. Selections from the Lun Yü. (H. Glessner Creel, Ed.). University of Chicago Press.

=== 1940 ===
- Rudolph, Richard C. (1940). "Emu Tanggo Orin Sakda-i Gisun Sarkiyan, An Unedited Manchu Manuscript." In Journal of the American Oriental Society, 60 , no. 4: 554–563. American Oriental Society.

=== 1942 ===
- Rudolph, Richard C. (January 1942). “Notes on the Riddle in China.” In California Folklore Quarterly 1, no. 1: 65– 82.

=== 1946 ===
- Rudolph, Richard C. (1946). "A Reversed Chinese Art Term." In Journal of the American Oriental Society, 66 , no. 1: 15-17. American Oriental Society.

=== 1947 ===
- Rudolph, Richard C. (1947). “Early Chinese References to Fossil Fishes.” In Isis, 36: 155.

=== 1948 ===
- Rudolph, Richard C. (1948). "Dynastic. Booty: an Altered Chinese Bronze,". In Harvard Journal of Asiatic Studies, 11:174-180.
- Rudolph, Richard C. (1948). “The Jumar in China,” In Isis, 40: 35-37.

=== 1950 ===
- Rudolph, R. C. (1950). The Antiquity of t’ou hu. Antiquity, 24(96), 175–178. doi:10.1017/S0003598X00023346
- Rudolph, R. C. (1950). Han Tomb Reliefs from Szechwan. Archives of the Chinese Art Society of America, 4, 29–38. http://www.jstor.org/stable/20066926

=== 1951 ===
- Rudolph, R. (1951). Han Tomb Art of West China: A Collection of First-and Second-Century Reliefs. Berkeley: University of California Press. https://doi.org/10.1525/9780520351707

=== 1952 ===
- Tsung-Ch’ien, C., & Rudolph, R. C. (1952). Literary Chinese by the Inductive Method: Vol. III. The Mencius, Books I-III. (H. Glessner Creel, Ed.). University of Chicago Press.

== Bibliography ==
- ed. Kenneth D. Klein, Creating an Oriental Languages Department and Library, UCLA Oral History Program (Los Angeles 1985).
- "Book Buying in China 1948-49: An Interview with Richard C. Rudolph," Journal of Asian Culture 6 (1982) 3-18.
- ed. Jun Suzuki and Mihoko Miki, "Richard C. Rudolph East Asian Library and Japanese Rare Books," Catalog of Rare Japanese Materials at the University of California, Los Angeles (Richard C. Rudolph East Asian Library Bibliographic Series no. 4, pp. xxxi-xxxiv.
- "Obituary Richard Casper Rudolph," The Journal of Asian Studies 62 (2003) 1031-1033.
- "A List of Publications of Richard C. Rudolph up to 1978," Monumenta Serica: Journal of Oriental Studies 34 (1979-1980) pp. i-v.
- "The Circle Closed: UCLA's Chinese Holdings Are Doubled," UCLA Librarian 18 (February 1965) pp. 31–32.
