= Beauport Abbey =

Abbey in Côtes-d'Armor, France

- Abbaye Saint-Budoc
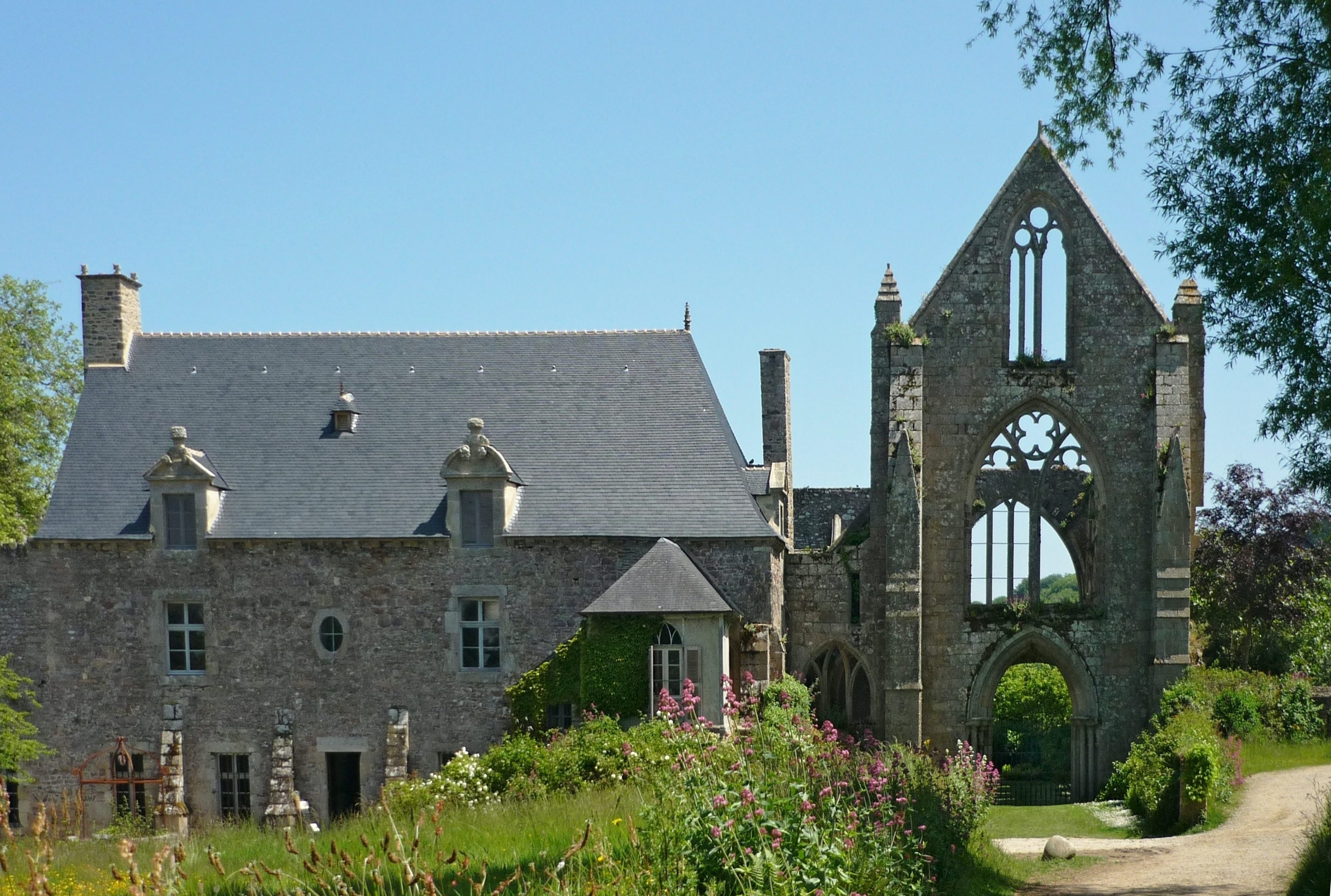
- Interactive map of Beauport Abbey

Monastery information
- Full name: Abbey of St. Budoc
- Other name: Abbaye de Beauport
- Order: Premonstratensian
- Established: March 13, 1202
- Disestablished: 1790
- Mother house: La Lucerne Abbey
- Dedication: St. Budoc of Dol
- Diocese: Saint-Brieuc
- Controlled churches: 20 parishes in Brittany and England

People
- Founder: Alain de Goëlo

Architecture
- Heritage designation: Monument historique
- Designated date: 1862
- Style: Gothic

Site
- Location: Rue de Beauport; Paimpol, 22500 Côtes-d'Armor
- Country: France
- Coordinates: 3.020633°N 48.767432°E
- Public access: yes
- Website: abbayebeauport.com

The Abbey of St. Budoc (French: Abbaye de Saint-Budoc), commonly called Beauport Abbey, was a 13th-century Premonstratensian abbey in the region of Brittany known as the Pays de Saint-Brieuc (pays historique) (the Historical Country of St. Brieuc). It was a major institution in the economic life of the region, having sovereignty over both commercial and maritime trade, as well as its supervision of the spiritual life of the inhabitants of that province. Even after its devastation under the ravages of the French Revolution, its surviving structures soon came to recognized a generation later by the acclaimed writer and historian Prosper Mérimée as a major example of the architecture of its era. He began a call for its preservation, which continues to this day.

== Foundation ==
=== Origins ===
During the 1170s, Count Henri de Trégor, a relative of the Duke of Brittany, established a canonry of Premonstratensian canons regular (commonly called Norbertine canons) on the isolated island of Saint-Riom, just off the coast of northern Brittany. A small hermitage had been established there in the 6th century by Celtic monks from Ireland, in line with the monastic practice there. After Henri's death in 1183, his son, Alain I de Goël, transferred the abbey to the canons of the noted Abbey of Saint-Victor in Paris. This transfer received the official approval of Pope Innocent III in 1198.

These canons, however, came to find the island too confining in terms of both their growth as a community and their style of ministry, based on their established experience in an urban environment. Thus they decided to withdraw their men. Another factor in their decision might have been the attempts then taking place by the local bishop of the Ancient Diocese of Dol—in which the abbey was located—to have his diocese promoted to an archdiocese, claiming ancient privilege. Church authorities were skeptical of these claims, however, and opposed the promotion.

Facing the departure of the Victorine canons, the count decided to make use of an abandoned monastery dating from the 8th or 9th century which lay in his domaine on the mainland. It had been left in ruins by Viking raids during the previous century. That location, known as the Abbey of Beauport, was of significance to his family. Its name was a reference to the family's claim of descent from the King of ancient Goëlo, the father of St. Budoc, and recalled a monastery of that name, Beau Port (Latin: Bellus Portus), which Budoc was claimed to have founded in Ireland. This helped to bolster the family connection to the famed local spiritual figure.

Alain approached the Abbey of La Lucerne in Normandy, requesting that 25 Norbertine canons be sent to establish a new community on the site. To this end, he drew up a charter, dated March 13, 1202, establishing the new community and transferring all the property of the abbey on Saint-Riom to the new foundation. At that point only the abbot and three Victorine canons were left on Saint-Riom.

The abbot of La Lucerne Abbey himself led the contingent of founders, composed of canons and laybrothers, to their new foundation. It was to be headed as prior by the canon Raoul, from Ardenne Abbey, who had volunteered to join the new community. In addition to the goods of the Saint-Riom Abbey, the count gave the canons ownership of the parish churches on the islands of Saint-Riom and Bréhat, in addition to the revenues from twenty parishes, including nine located in the English Diocese of Lincoln. Additionally, he authorized an annual market day in the nearby town of Paimpol, the revenues from which were to be dedicated to the support of the canons, due to which it came to be called "Monks Fair". Furthermore, two of the count's brothers, Conan and Geslin, as well as several other lords of the region pledged large amounts of lumber for the construction needed to revive the abbey. As he had done for the previous foundation, these donations were confirmed by Pope Innocent in 1202.

== Decline and end ==
By the time of the French Revolution, the abbey was in shambles and deteriorating. Only twelve religious were left, with the complex being run by thirteen servants. The decree of secularization of 1790 ended the community.
