= The Mystic Ark =

Lost work of art

The Mystic Ark is an image described by Hugh of Saint Victor (ca. 1096–1141), but no copy exists and debate surrounds whether it ever physically existed.

== Renderings ==
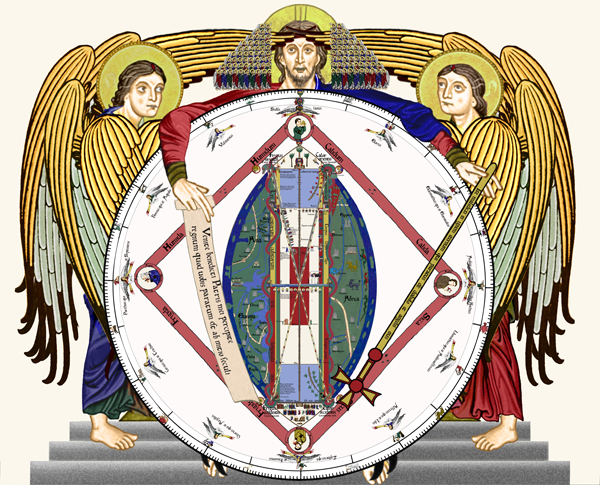
The Mystic Ark. Original 1125 to early 1130. Shown as it might have appeared if constructed at the convent of Hohenbourg during the abbacy of Abbess Herrad in the late twelfth century. The construction here has a height of 3.632 meters (11 feet, 11 inches) and width of 4.623 meters (15 feet, 2 inches).

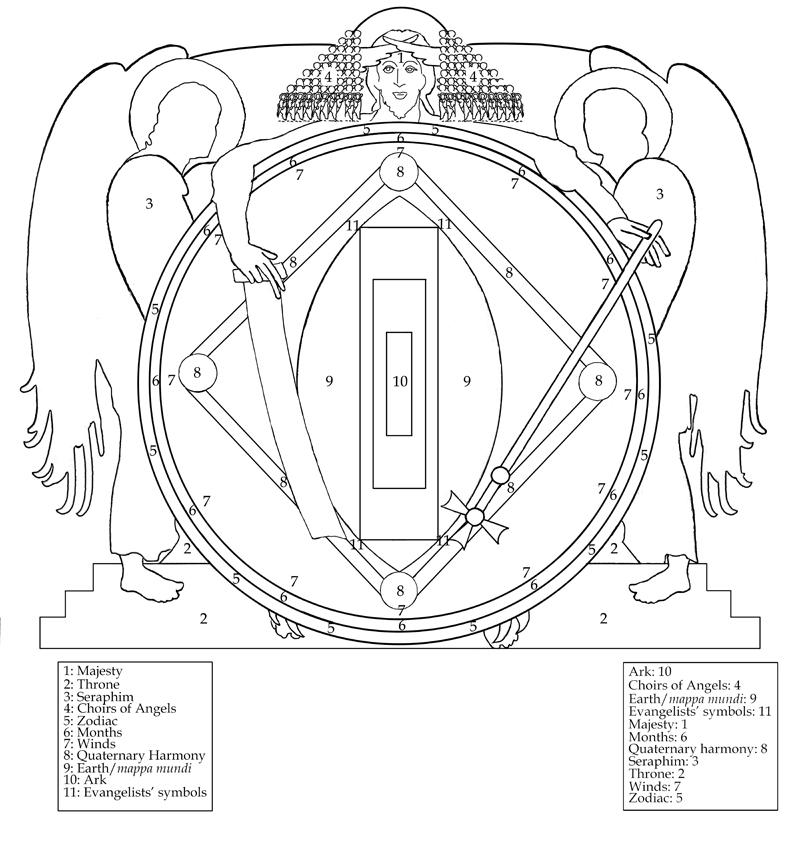
The Mystic Ark, diagram. Main components. Clement/Bahmer/Rivas/Rudolph
