= La Lucerne-d'Outremer =

- Commune
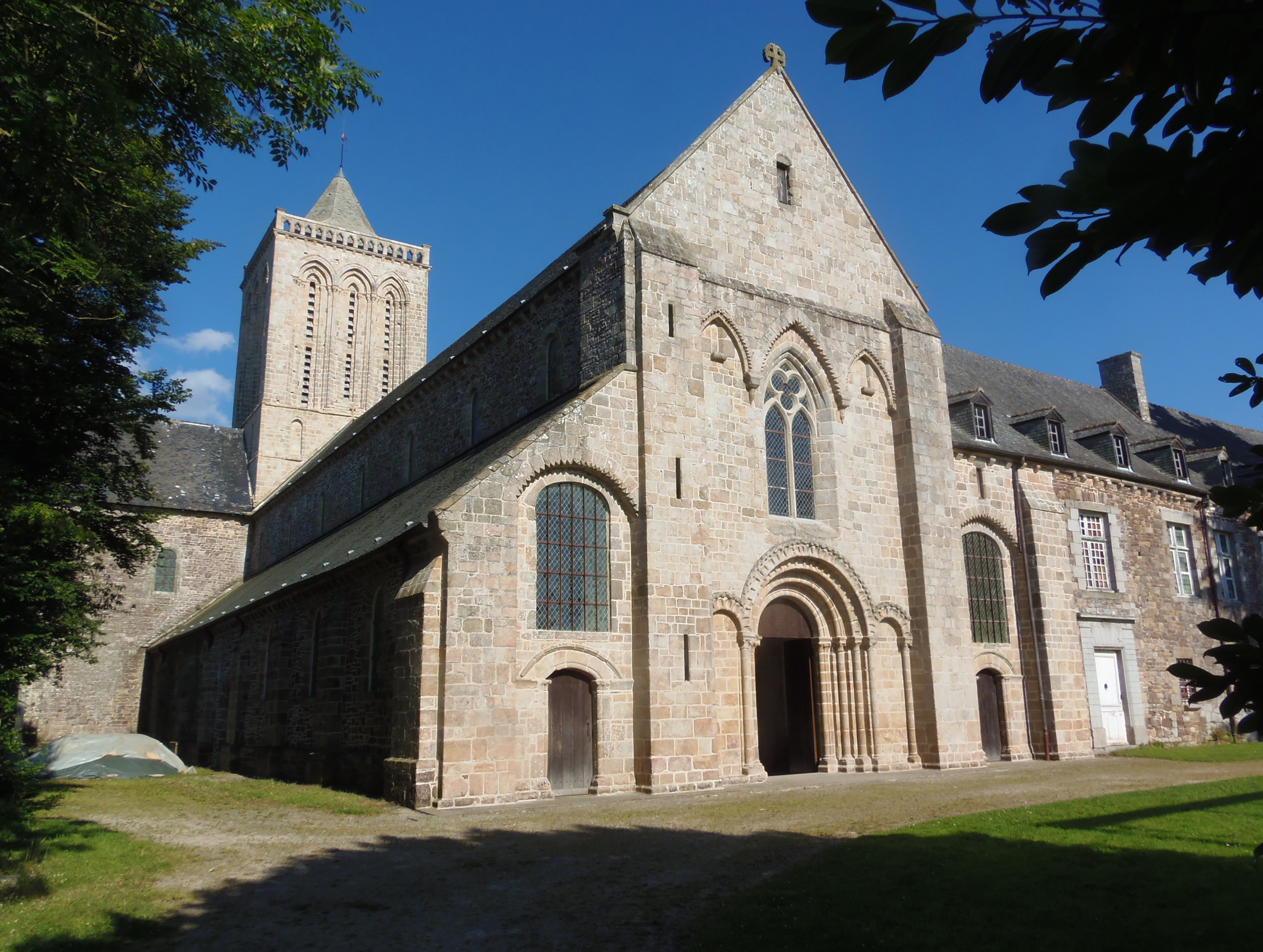
- The church in La Lucerne-d'Outremer
- Location of La Lucerne-d'Outremer
- Location within France Location within Normandy
- Coordinates: 48°47′07″N 1°25′32″W
- Country: France
- Region: Normandy
- Department: Manche
- Arrondissement: Avranches
- Canton: Bréhal
- Intercommunality: Granville, Terre et Mer

Government
  - Mayor (2020–2026): Pierre Lebourgeois
- Area^{1}: 14.48 km^{2} (5.59 sq mi)
- Elevation: 110 m (360 ft)
- Highest elevation: 146 m (479 ft)
- Lowest elevation: 31 m (102 ft)
- Population (2023): 880
  - Density: 61/km^{2} (160/sq mi)
- Time zone: UTC+01:00 (CET)
  - Summer (DST): UTC+02:00 (CEST)
- INSEE/Postal code: 50281 /50320
- ^{1} French Land Register data, which excludes lakes, ponds, glaciers > 1 km^{2} (0.386 sq mi or 247 acres) and river estuaries.

La Lucerne-d'Outremer (French pronunciation: [la lysɛʁn dutʁəmɛʁ]) is a commune in the Manche department in Normandy in north-western France.

== See also ==
- Communes of the Manche department
