= Marie-Thérèse d'Alverny =

French librarian and historian (1903 – 1991)

Marie-Thérèse d'Alverny (25 January 1903 – 26 April 1991) was a French librarian and historian.

== Biography ==
After studies at the École nationale des chartes and the École pratique des hautes études, d'Alverny joined the staff of the Bibliothèque nationale de France in 1947. From 1957 she taught at the Centre d'études supérieures de civilisation médiévale in Poitiers. In 1962 she was appointed to the Centre national de la recherche scientifique. She was elected to the American Philosophical Society in 1974 and the American Academy of Arts and Sciences in 1976. In 1989, she received an honorary doctorate from the Jagiellonian University. For additional honours, d'Alverny joined the International Academy of the History of Science in 1960 before becoming a full member in 1965. In 1966, d'Alverny was named a Corresponding Fellow of the British Academy.

== Bibliography ==
- Les traductions des philosophes arabes, Tipografia del senato del Dott, 1954, 9 p.
- Récréations monastiques: les couteaux à manche d'ivoire, 1955, 32 p.
- Le symbolisme de la sagesse et le Christ de Saint Dunstan, 1st ed. 1956, Variorum, 1993, 332 p., ISBN 0860783901
- Un nouveau manuscrit des "tabulae mechlinenses" d'Henri Bate de Malines, 1956, 4 p.
- Les anges et les jours, 1957, 32 p.
- Catalogue général des manuscrits latins, nos 3014–3277, Volume 4, Bibliothèque nationale, 1958, 492 p.
- "Aristotelismo padovano e filosofia aristotelica", Atti del XII Congresso internazionale di filosofia, 1960
- Survivance et renaissance d'Avicenne à Venise et à Padoue, 1961
- Catalogue des manuscrits en écriture latine portant des indications de date, de lieu ou de copiste, 1962
- Une baguette magique, 1964
- Les mystères de l'église, d'après Pierre de Roissy, 1966
- Un sermon d'Alain de Lille sur la misère de l'homme, 1966
- Astrologues et théologiens au xiie siècle, 1967
- Maître Alain, "nova et vetera", 1968
- Les traductions d'Aristote et de ses commentateurs, 1968
- Avicennisme en Italie, 1971
- Un adversaire de saint Thomas: Petrus Iohannis Olivi, 1974
- Algazel dans l'Occident latin, 1974
- Survivances du "système d'Héraclide" au Moyen Âge, 1975
- L'homme comme symbole: le microcosme, 1976
- "Les nouveaux apports dans les domaines de la science et de la pensée au temps de Philippe Auguste: la philosophie", in La France de Philippe Auguste, le temps des mutations, 1980
- Translations and translators, 1982
- Remarques sur la tradition manuscrite de la "Summa alexandrinorum", 1983
- "Alain de Lille et l'Islam: le Contra Paganos", dans Islam et chrétiens du Midi (xiie-xive s.) (Cahiers de Fanjeaux; 18), 1983
- Pietro d'Abano traducteur de Galien, 1985
- Utilité et limites des répertoires et catalogues spécialisés de manuscrits médiévaux, 1986
- Pseudo-Aristotle, "De elementis", 1986
- "Les traductions à deux interprètes, d'arabe en langue vernaculaire et de langue vernaculaire en latin", in Traductions et traducteurs au Moyen Âge, Actes du colloque international du CNRS, IRHT, 1989, p. 193-201.
- (with Charles Burnett) Pensée médiévale en Occident: théologie, magie et autres textes des xiie-xiiie siècles, Variorum, 1995, 339 p.
