= Hugh of Saint Victor =

German canon regular and theologian

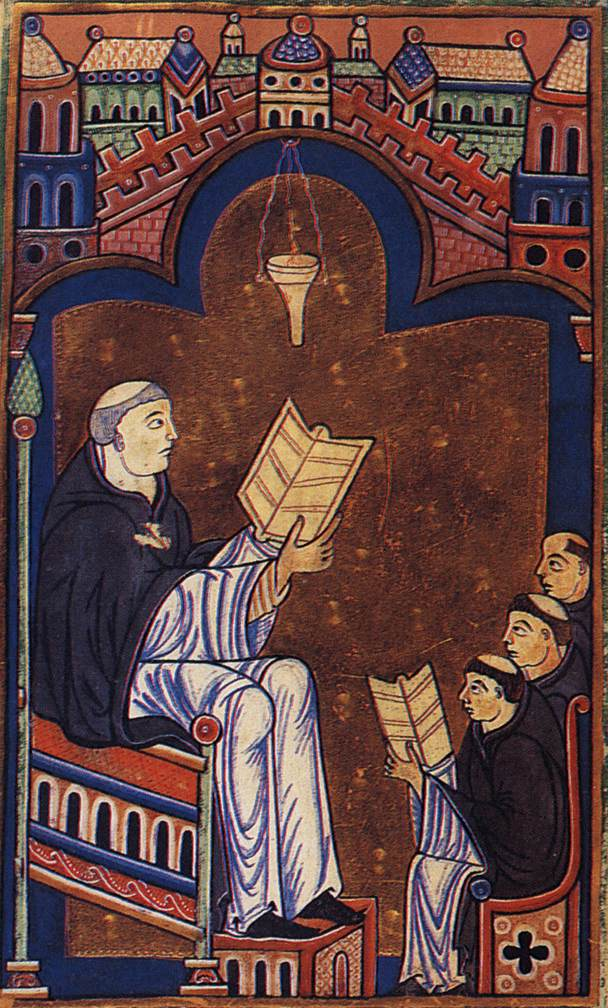
- Born: c. 1096 probably Duchy of Saxony
- Died: 11 February 1141; Abbey of Saint Victor, Paris, Kingdom of France
- Occupations: Canon regular, theologian, philosopher

Education
- Education: Abbey of Saint Victor, Paris

Philosophical work
- Era: Medieval philosophy
- Region: Western philosophy
- School: Scholasticism, Christian mysticism
- Institutions: Abbey of Saint Victor, Paris
- Notable students: Andrew of Saint Victor, Peter Lombard, Richard of Saint Victor
- Main interests: Theology, mysticism, biblical exegesis, sacraments

Hugh of Saint Victor (c. 1096 – 11 February 1141) was a German canon regular and a leading theologian and writer on mystical theology.

== Life ==
As with many medieval figures, little is known about Hugh's early life. He was probably born in the 1090s. His homeland may have been the Duchy of Saxony. Some sources say that his birth occurred in the Harz district, being the eldest son of Baron Conrad of Blankenburg. Over the protests of his family, he entered the Priory of St. Pancras, a community of canons regular, where he had studied, located at Hamerleve or Hamersleben, near Halberstadt.

Due to civil unrest shortly after his entry to the priory, Hugh's uncle, Reinhard of Blankenburg, who was the local bishop, advised him to transfer to the Abbey of Saint Victor in Paris, where he himself had studied theology. He accepted his uncle's advice and made the move at a date which is unclear, possibly 1115–18 or around 1120. He spent the rest of his life there, advancing to head the school.

== Works ==
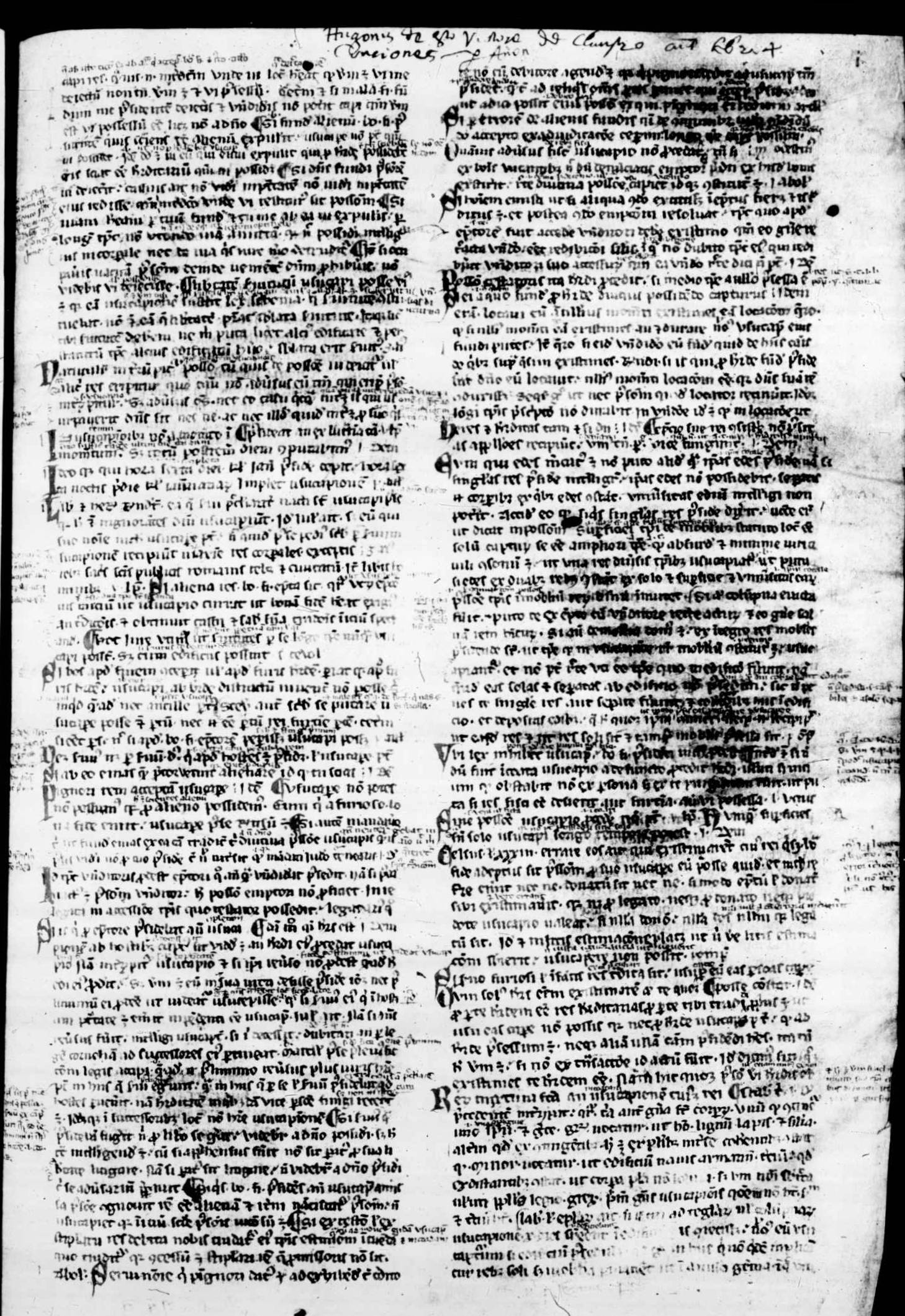
De claustro anime, 14th-century manuscript. Hereford, Cathedral Library, Manuscript collection, P.5.XII.

Hugh wrote many works from the 1120s until his death (Migne, Patrologia Latina contains 46 works by Hugh, and this is not a full collection), including works of theology (both treatises and sententiae), commentaries (mostly on the Bible but also including one of pseudo-Dionysius' Celestial Hierarchies), mysticism, philosophy and the arts, and a number of letters and sermons.

Hugh was influenced by many people, but chiefly by Saint Augustine, especially in holding that the arts and philosophy can serve theology.

Hugh's most significant works include:

- De sacramentis christianae fidei (On the Mysteries of the Christian Faith/On the Sacraments of the Christian Faith) It is Hugh's most celebrated masterpiece and presents the bulk of Hugh's thoughts on theological and mystical ideas, ranging from God and angels to natural laws.
- Didascalicon de studio legendi (Didascalicon, or, On the Study of Reading). The subtitle to the Didascalicon, De Studio Legendi, makes the purpose of Hugh's tract clear. Written for the students at the school of Saint Victor, the work is a preliminary introduction to the theological and exegetical studies taught at the Parisian schools, the most advanced centers of learning in Europe in the 12th century. Citing a wide range classical and medieval sources, and with Augustine as his principal authority, Hugh sets forth a comprehensive synthesis of rhetoric, philosophy, and exegesis, designed to serve as a foundation for advanced theological study. The Didascalicon is primarily pedagogical, and not speculative, in nature. It provides the modern reader with a clear sense of the intellectual equipment expected of, if not always fully possessed by, high medieval theologians.
- In 1125–30, Hugh wrote three treatises structured around Noah's ark: De arca Noe morali (Noah's Moral Ark/On the Moral Interpretation of the Ark of Noah), De arca Noe mystica (Noah's Mystical Ark/On the Mystic Interpretation of the Ark of Noah), and De vanitate mundi (The World's Vanity). De arca Noe morali and De arca Noe mystica reflect Hugh's fascination with both mysticism and the book of Genesis. The description he conjectured of the ark, a ship's hull with a sloped roof and a side door, became the "standard description" of the ark, whose shape is not clearly described in Genesis.
- In Hierarchiam celestem commentaria (Commentary on the Celestial Hierarchy), a commentary on the work by pseudo-Dionysius, perhaps begun around 1125. After Eriugena's translation of Dionysius in the ninth century, there is almost no interest shown in Dionysius until Hugh's commentary. It is possible that Hugh may have decided to produce the commentary (which perhaps originated in lectures to students) because of the continuing (incorrect) belief that the patron saint of the Abbey of Saint Denis, Saint Denis, was to be identified with pseudo-Dionysius. Dionysian thought did not form an important influence on the rest of Hugh's work. Hugh's commentary, however, became a major part of the twelfth and thirteenth-century surge in interest in Dionysius; his and Eriugena's commentaries were often attached to the Dionysian corpus in manuscripts, such that his thought had great influence on later interpretation of Dionysius by Richard of St Victor, Thomas Gallus, Hugh of Balma, Bonaventure and others.

Other works by Hugh of St Victor include:

- In Salomonis Ecclesiasten (Commentary on Ecclesiastes).
- De tribus diebus (On the Three Days).
- De sapientia animae Christi.
- De unione corporis et spiritus (The Union of the Body and the Spirit).
- Epitome Dindimi in philosophiam (Epitome of Dindimus on Philosophy).
- Practica Geometriae (The Practice of Geometry).
- De Grammatica (On Grammar).
- Soliloquium de Arrha Animae (The Soliloquy on the Earnest Money of the Soul).
- De contemplatione et ejus speciebus (On Contemplation and its Forms). This is one of the earliest systematic works devoted to contemplation. It appears not to have been written by Hugh himself, but composed by one of his students, possibly from classnotes from his lectures.
- On Sacred Scripture and its Authors.
- Various other treatises exist whose authorship by Hugh is uncertain. Six of these are reprinted, in Latin in Roger Baron, ed, Hugues de Saint-Victor: Six Opuscules Spirituels, Sources chrétiennes 155, (Paris, 1969). They are: De meditatione, De verbo Dei, De substantia dilectionis, Quid vere diligendus est, De quinque septenis , and De septem donis Spiritus sancti
- De anima is a treatise of the soul: the text will be found in the edition of Hugh's works in the Patrologia Latina of J. P. Migne. Part of it was paraphrased in the West Mercian dialect of Middle English by the author of the Katherine Group.
- Descriptio mappae mundi (Description of a World Map).

Various other works were wrongly attributed to Hugh in later thought. One such particularly influential work was the Exposition of the Rule of St Augustine, now accepted to be from the Victorine school but not by Hugh of St Victor.

A new edition of Hugh's works has been started. The first publication is: Hugonis de Sancto Victore De sacramentis Christiane fidei, ed. Rainer Berndt, Münster: Aschendorff, 2008.

== Philosophy and theology ==
The early Didascalicon was an elementary, encyclopedic approach to God and Christ, in which Hugh avoided controversial subjects and focused on what he took to be commonplaces of Catholic Christianity. In it he outlined three types of philosophy or "science" [scientia] that can help mortals improve themselves and advance toward God: theoretical philosophy (theology, mathematics, physics) provides them with truth, practical philosophy (ethics, economics, politics) aids them in becoming virtuous and prudent, and "mechanical" or "illiberal" philosophy (e.g., carpentry, agriculture, medicine) yields physical benefits. A fourth philosophy, logic, is preparatory to the others and exists to ensure clear and proper conclusions in them. Hugh's deeply mystical bent did not prevent him from seeing philosophy as a useful tool for understanding the divine, or from using it to argue on behalf of faith.

Hugh was heavily influenced by Augustine's exegesis of Genesis. Divine Wisdom was the archetypal form of creation. The creation of the world in six days was a mystery for man to contemplate, perhaps even a sacrament. God's forming order from chaos to make the world was a message to humans to rise up from their own chaos of ignorance and become creatures of Wisdom and therefore beauty. This kind of mystical-ethical interpretation was typical for Hugh, who tended to find Genesis interesting for its moral lessons rather than as a literal account of events.

Along with Jesus, the sacraments were divine gifts that God gave man to redeem himself, though God could have used other means. Hugh separated everything along the lines of opus creationis and opus restaurationis. Opus Creationis was the works of the creation, referring to God's creative activity, the true good natures of things, and the original state and destiny of humanity. The opus restaurationis was that which dealt with the reasons for God sending Jesus and the consequences of that. Hugh believed that God did not have to send Jesus and that He had other options open to Him. Why he chose to send Jesus is a mystery we are to meditate on and is to be learned through revelation, with the aid of philosophy to facilitate understanding.

== Legacy ==
Within the Abbey of St Victor, many scholars who followed him are often known as the 'School of St Victor'. Andrew of St Victor studied under Hugh. Others, who probably entered the community too late to be directly educated by Hugh, include Richard of Saint Victor and Godfrey. One of Hugh's ideals that did not take root in St Victor, however, was his embracing of science and philosophy as tools for approaching God.

His works are in hundreds of libraries all across Europe. He is quoted in many other publications after his death, and Bonaventure praises him in De reductione artium ad theologiam.

He was also an influence on the critic Erich Auerbach, who cited this passage (from Book Three: Chapter Nineteen of The Didascalion) in his essay "Philology and World Literature":

All the world is a foreign soil to those who philosophize….

It is a great source of virtue for the disciplined mind to learn, bit by bit, first to change in visible and transitory things, so that later it may leave them behind altogether. One to whom his homeland is sweet is a tender beginner; one at home in every land is already strong; truly perfect is he to whom the whole world is exile. The first has focused his love of the world, the second has extended it, the last has extinguished it.

I have lived in exile since boyhood, and I know with what grief sometimes the soul takes leave of the narrow hearth of a peasant’s hut, and I know too the freedom with which, thereafter, it disdains marble halls and paneled ceilings.

== Works ==
=== Modern editions ===
Latin text

- Latin texts of Hugh of St. Victor are available in the Migne edition at Documenta Catholica Omnia
- Henry Buttimer, Hugonis de Sancto Victore. Didascalicon. De Studio Legendi (Washington, DC: Catholic University Press, 1939).
- Hugh of St Victor, L'oeuvre de Hugues de Saint-Victor. 1. De institutione novitiorum. De virtute orandi. De laude caritatis. De arrha animae, Latin text edited by H.B. Feiss & P. Sicard; French translation by D. Poirel, H. Rochais & P. Sicard. Introduction, notes and appendices by D. Poirel (Turnhout, Brepols, 1997)
- Hugues de Saint-Victor, L'oeuvre de Hugues de Saint-Victor. 2. Super Canticum Mariae. Pro Assumptione Virginis. De beatae Mariae virginitate. Egredietur virga, Maria porta, edited by B. Jollès (Turnhout: Brepols, 2000)
- Hugo de Sancto Victore, De archa Noe. Libellus de formatione arche, ed Patricius Sicard, CCCM vol 176, Hugonis de Sancto Victore Opera, I (Turnhout: Brepols, 2001)
- Hugo de Sancto Victore, De tribus diebus, ed Dominique Poirel, CCCM vol 177, Hugonis de Sancto Victore Opera, II (Turnhout: Brepols, 2002)
- Hugo de Sancto Victore, De sacramentis Christiane fidei, ed. Rainer Berndt (Münster: Aschendorff, 2008)
- Hugo de Sancto Victore, Super Ierarchiam Dionysii, CCCM vol 178, Hugonis de Sancto Victore Opera, III (Turnhout: Brepols, forthcoming)

English translations

- Hugh of St Victor, Explanation of the Rule of St. Augustine, translated by Aloysius Smith (London, 1911)
- Hugh of St Victor, The Soul's Betrothal-Gift, translated by FS Taylor (London, 1945) [translation of De Arrha Animae]
- Hugh of St Victor, On the sacraments of the Christian faith: (De sacramentis), translated by Roy J. Deferrari (Cambridge, MA: Mediaeval Academy of America, 1951) [reprinted 2007]
- Hugh of Saint-Victor: Selected spiritual writings, translated by a religious of C.S.M.V.; with an introduction by Aelred Squire. (London: Faber, 1962) [reprinted in Eugene, Oregon: Wipf & Stock Publishers, 2009] [contains a translation of the first four books of De arca Noe morali and the first two (of four) books of De vanitate mundi].
- The Didascalicon of Hugh of St. Victor, translated by Jerome Taylor (New York and London: Columbia U. P., 1961) [reprinted 1991] [translation of the Didascalicon]
- Soliloquy on the Earnest Money of the Soul, trans Kevin Herbert (Milwaukee, WI: Marquette University Press, 1984) [translation of Soliloquium de Arrha Animae]
- Hugh of St Victor, Practica Geometriae, trans. Frederick A Homann (Milwaukee: Marquette University Press, 1991)
- Hugh of St Victor, extracts from Introductory Notes on the Scriptures and on the Scriptural Writers, trans Denys Turner, in Denys Turner, Eros and Allegory: Medieval Exegesis of the Song of Songs (Kalamazoo, MI: Cistercian Publications, 1995), 265-274
- Boyd Taylor Coolman and Dale M Coulter, eds, Trinity and creation: a selection of works of Hugh, Richard and Adam of St Victor (Turnhout: Brepols, 2010) [includes translation of Hugh of St Victor, On the Three Days and Sentences on Divinity]
- Hugh Feiss, ed, On love: a selection of works of Hugh, Adam, Achard, Richard and Godfrey of St Victor (Turnhout: Brepols, 2011) [includes translations of The Praise of the Bridegroom, On the Substance of Love, On the Praise of Charity, What Truly Should be Loved?, On the Four Degrees of Violent Love, trans. A.B. Kraebel, and Soliloquy on the Betrothal-Gift of the Soul]
- Franklin T. Harkins and Frans van Liere, eds, Interpretation of scripture: theory. A selection of works of Hugh, Andrew, Richard and Godfrey of St Victor, and of Robert of Melun (Turnhout, Belgium: Brepols, 2012) [contains translations of: Didascalion on the study of reading, introduced and translated by Franklin T Harkins; On Sacred Scripture and its authors and The diligent examiner, introduced and translated by Frans van Liere; On the sacraments of the Christian faith, prologues, introduced and translated by Christopher P Evans]

The Compendium of Philosophy (Compendium Philosophiae) attributed to Hugh of St Victor in several medieval manuscripts, upon rediscovery and examination in the 20th century, has turned out to have actually been a recension of William of Conches's De Philosophia Mundi.

== See also ==
- Art of memory § Principles, where Hugh's Didascalicon and Chronica are referred to.
- Hendrik Mande
- The Mystic Ark, painting by Hugh
