= Abbey of Saint-Victor, Paris =

Abbey in Paris, France

Coordinates: 48°50′45″N 2°21′23″E

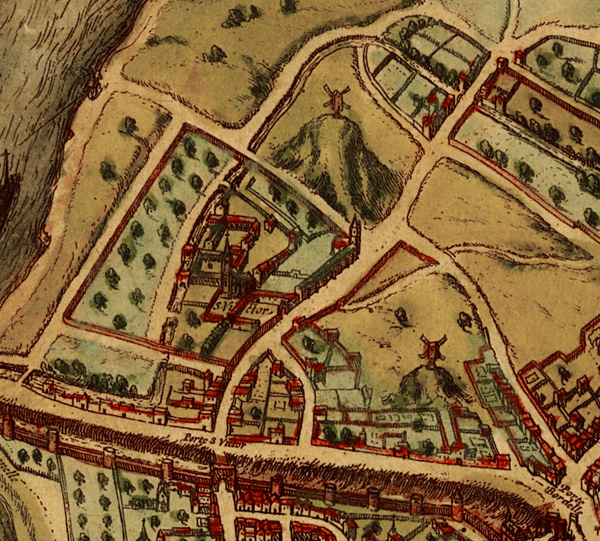
St. Victor's in 1572

The Abbey of Saint Victor, Paris, also known as Royal Abbey and School of Saint Victor, was an abbey near Paris, France. Its origins are connected to the decision of William of Champeaux, the Archdeacon of Paris, to retire to a small hermitage near Paris in 1108. He took on the life, vocation and observances of the Canons Regular, and his new community followed the Augustinian Rule.

William was famed for his teaching, and was followed to his hermitage by many of his disciples, including Peter Abelard, and was convinced by them to take up his lecturing again. William was made Bishop of Châlons-sur-Marne in 1113, and was succeeded in his hermitage at St. Victor's by Gilduin, who promoted the canonical order and its new abbey vigorously.

Through generous gifts from popes, kings, queens, and nobles, the Abbey of St. Victor was soon richly endowed. Many houses of canons regular came under its influence and were reformed through its leadership, including the Abbey of Ste Geneviève (Paris), Wigmore Abbey in Herefordshire, St. Augustine's (Bristol), St. Catherine's (Waterford), St. Thomas's (Dublin), and San Pietro ad Aram (Naples). King Louis VIII mentioned no less than forty abbeys of the Order of St. Victor in his last will and testament, and he left 4,000 pounds to be equally divided among them, and all his jewels for the building of the abbey church in Paris. Before the abbey was 160 years old, several cardinals and at least eight significant abbots had been produced from among its members.

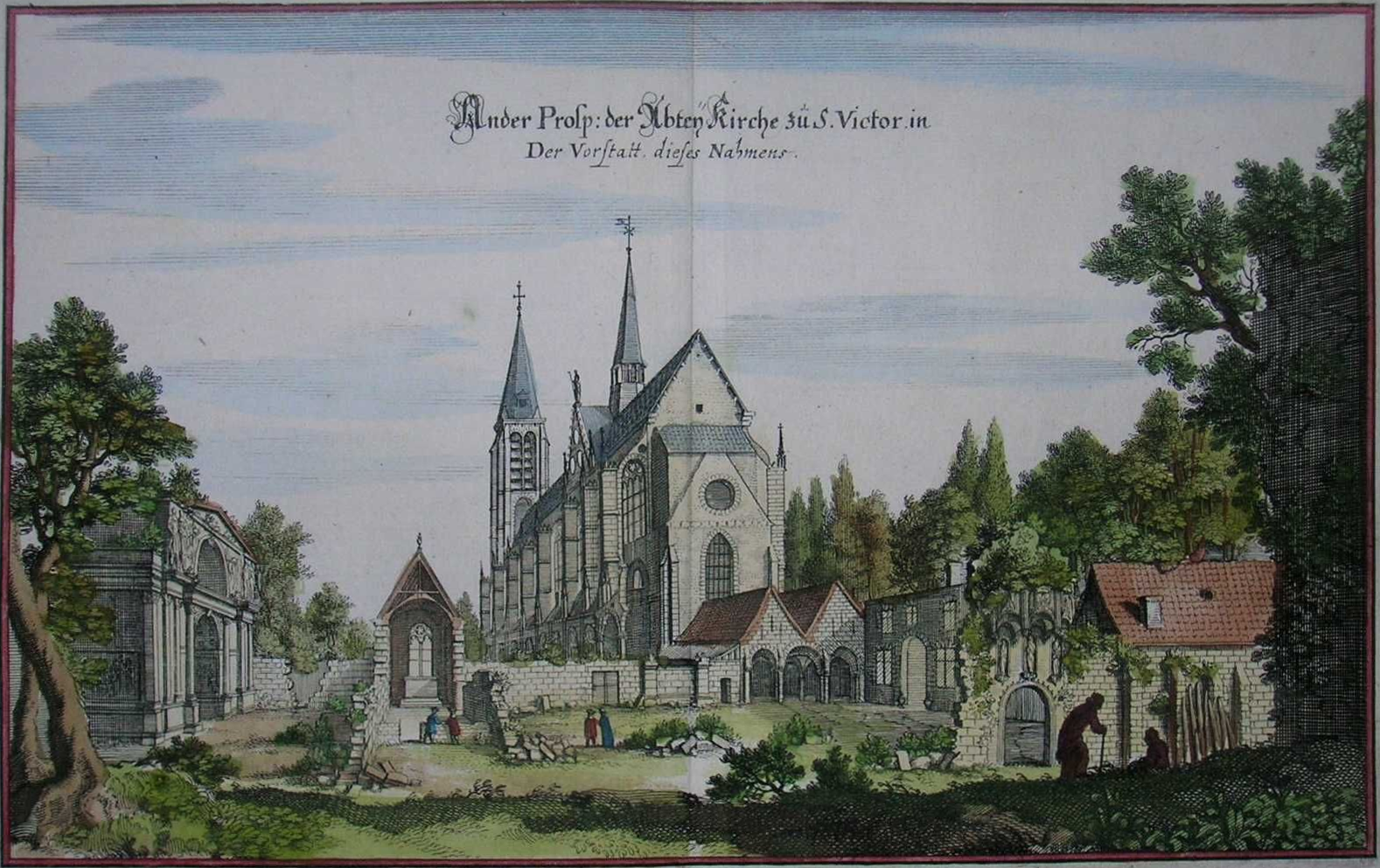
Abbey of St. Victor, 1655

The traditions of William of Champeaux were handed on, and the abbey became a center of piety and learning, attracting famous students, scholars and intellectuals including Hugh of St. Victor, Peter Lombard and Thomas Becket. In fact, the school of Saint Victor, with the schools of Ste Geneviève and Notre-Dame de Paris, was the cradle of the University of Paris.

== Formation ==
It was around 1108 that William of Champeaux retired from teaching with a few disciples in a hermitage (or cella) abandoned near a chapel dedicated to St. Victor, at the foot of the Montagne Sainte-Geneviève (the abbey remained outside the walls of the enclosure built by Philip Augustus at the end of the twelfth century).

In 1113, when William was elected Bishop of Chalons-sur-Marne, Louis VI transformed the small retreat into an abbey that was richly endowed the following year. The Pope dedicated the foundation.

The successor of William was the prior Gilduin, dearest disciple of William and confessor of the king. Born in Paris, he is the abbot of 1113–1155. It is most probably during his abbacy, that the customs of St. Victor were composed in the Liber Ordinis Sancti Victoris, following a rigorous asceticism, where silence and manual labor prevailed.

In 1148, the abbey acquired the college of Sainte-Geneviève.

The abbey later fell on hard times, being identified in the 17th and early 18th centuries with the Jansenist movement. It was dissolved and destroyed during the French Revolution.

The site of the former abbey is now largely occupied by Paris VI and VII Universities and by the Muséum and Jardin des Plantes. The name survives in a neighbouring street.

== Makeup of the Congregation ==
The Victorines are one of the most illustrious of the twelfth-century congregations in terms of cosmopolitan and intellectual pursuits. Thanks to Hugh and his comprehensive teachings, the school took on a universalist dimension that Victorines defended against those who wanted to "rip and shred the whole body and who, by a perverse judgment, arbitrarily choose whatever pleases them."

Saint-Victor became a popular retreat of Bernard of Clairvaux and Thomas Becket (1118-1170), and the bishops of Paris had an apartment there. The cloister became a public school of theology and liberal arts, a kind of monastery-university attended by the philosopher Abelard and Peter Lombard, author of the famous Sentences (Libri Quattuor Sententiarum).

=== Library ===
The abbey had a rich library open to the public. In the consulting room the manuscripts were chained. But there were other properties: liturgical manuscripts were kept for the choir, some others near the refectory, for reading aloud in the infirmary to the sick and dying, and others consisting of double reserves by the librarian (armarius). Part of the library consisted of a group of books (minores) the canons or students could borrow over long periods (concessi).

The teaching of the abbey activity favoured the development of library funds. Richly endowed, the abbey would be filled by purchases or copies from elsewhere: the scriptorium seems not to have been well developed. Endowments also enriched the collection. In addition, the documents found upon the death of a Victorin (sermons, for example) were compiled and stored in the library.

In Gargantua and Pantagruel by Rabelais, there are satirical references to the library of St Victor (Chapter VII.6).

=== Scriptorium ===
The scriptorium of Saint-Victor has certainly been the cause of experience glosses texts of Scripture by formatting columns, "formal provision entirely unique"; the biblical text in the center, and commentaries on the outside. This seems to be influence of Italian origin as regards their decoration.

=== Masters of Saint-Victor ===
The main and iconic masters of this scholarly abbey remain Hugh and Richard of St. Victor. The first being recognized as the true founder of the school, abbot of 1125-1140, the complete scholar, philosopher, mystic and teacher, whose book De sacramentis christianae fidei (1136-1141) is the most important theological synthesis before scholastic Saint Thomas Aquinas. The second, Richard of St. Victor is considered the founder of the medieval mysticism.

Philosophies developed by these Victorines were to give a rational support for the mystical, aided by divine grace, enlightenment or innate principles of truth to the soul. One of the goals of all the Victorines was to promote the spiritual life.

== Burials at the Abbey ==
- William de Braose, 4th Lord of Bramber
