= Ascetical theology =

Spiritual teachings in the Christian Bible

Ascetical theology refers to the systematic study or presentation of spiritual teachings derived from the Christian Bible—including the Hebrew Bible and New Testament—and writings from the Church Fathers. Its purpose is to provide guidance for individuals seeking to follow the teachings of Jesus and achieve Christian perfection. Christian asceticism is commonly thought to imply self-denial for a spiritual purpose. The term ascetical theology is used primarily in Roman Catholic theology. Eastern Orthodox Christian theology carries its own distinct terms and definitions; other Christian movements conceive of God and Jesus differently from both Orthodox Christianity and Catholicism.

== Etymology ==
The word ascetic comes from the Greek ἄσκησις (askesis), meaning practice. The English term ascesis means "the practice of self-discipline".

== Essential concepts ==
- Dogmatic theology addresses what a religion affirms as Truth, responding to the question, "What are we following?" It examines knowledge about God, human nature, and human redemption. Ascetical theology relies on dogmatic theology for its foundational tenets. For instance, if a religion does not affirm a fallen nature, ascetical theology may rely on an inaccurate premise, potentially leading to unproductive outcomes in approaching God.
- Moral theology focuses on behavior and elaborates on moral implications derived from foundational texts such as the Decalogue in the Hebrew Bible and the Sermon on the Mount. It is crucial for guiding Christian individuals in the early stages of prayer and ensuring alignment with Christian creeds. A growing sense of holiness should correspond with adherence to the basic moral precepts. Consequently, moral theology assists the ascetic in living out these moral precepts as informed by dogmas and encourages progression beyond mere moral obligations.
- Mystical theology examines the soul's union with God through experiences not generated by human effort. During early stages of prayer, individuals may encounter aridities (moments of diminished zeal). Later, they may face "passive trials", such as the "dark night of the soul" described by John of the Cross. These experiences are interpreted as periods of purification, where reliance on faith supersedes reliance on sensory experiences from prayer. Mystical theology studies these occurrences, although Christian dogma does not assert that mystical phenomena are required to enter Heaven.
- In accordance with dogmatic theology, the sacraments symbolize and confer grace. The sacraments most commonly experienced by Christian practitioners are the Eucharist and confession. The Eucharist, especially Eucharist in the Catholic Church, is noted by believers for facilitating a union with God, illustrated in passages such as John 6:58. Confession purifies the penitent who expresses genuine remorse for offending God and is crucial before receiving the Eucharist. As individuals seek union with God, hidden issues in their souls may emerge, revealing previously unnoticed sinful behaviors. This purgative process fosters a deeper awareness of actions that support Christian love.

== Catholicism ==
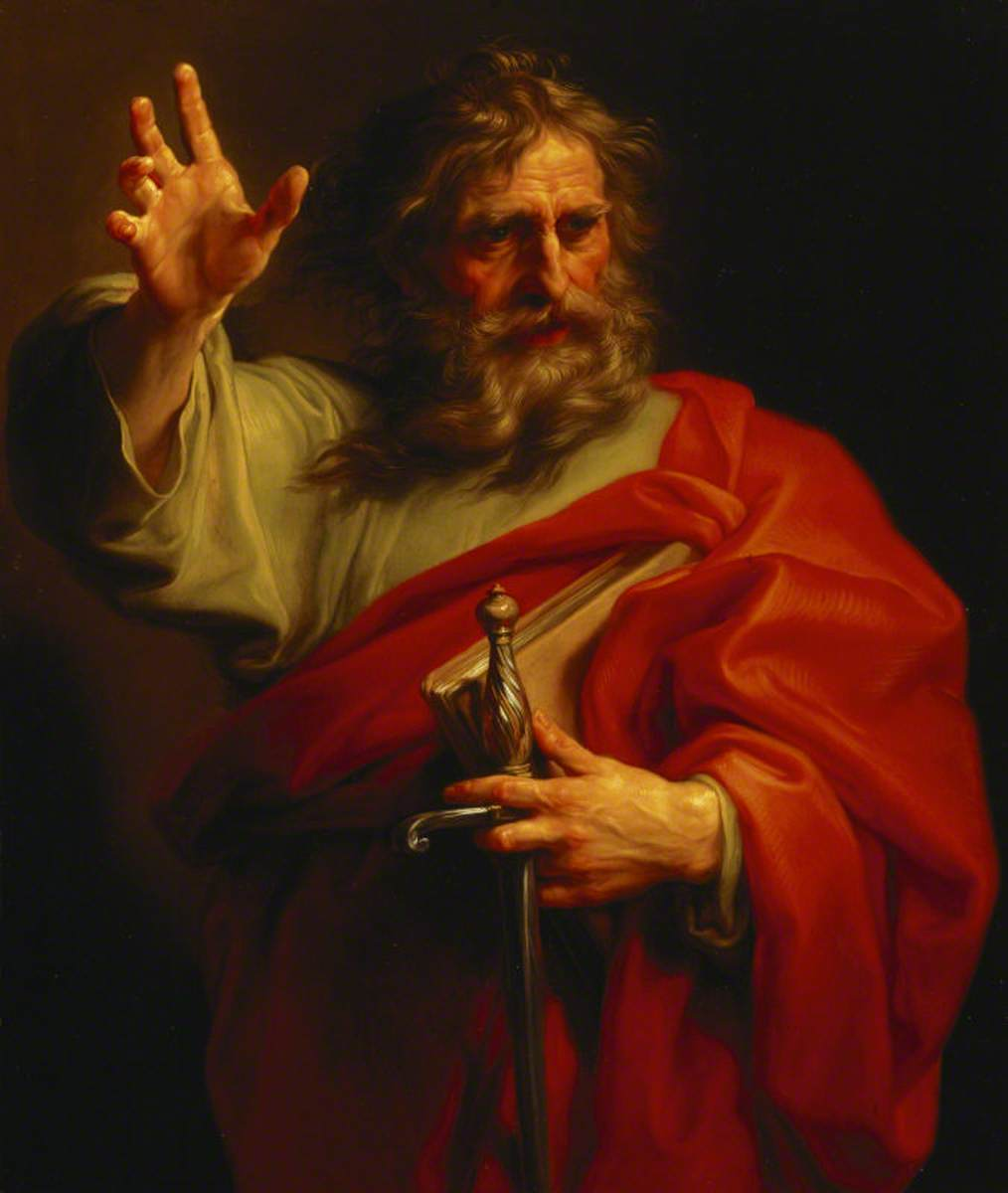
Saint Paul (1740–1743), by Pompeo Batoni, depicted holding a sword.

Ascetics, as a branch of theology, can be defined as the scientific examination of Christian asceticism. It is characterized as the theological "science of the spiritual life," positioned apart from both dogma and morality. This field is grounded in the truths of faith and aims toward Christian perfection, considered a logical outcome of dogma, particularly the fundamental doctrine of the Incarnation of Jesus. It serves as a resource for both religious individuals and the lay apostolate. Asceticism, taken in its literal signification, means a 'polishing', 'smoothing', or 'refining'. The Greeks used the word to designate the exercises of athletes, developing the powers dormant in the body and training it to its full natural beauty. The end for which these gymnastic exercises were undertaken was the laurel wreath bestowed on the victor in the public games. The life of the Christian is, as Jesus is recorded teaching in Matthew 11:12, a struggle for the kingdom of heaven. To give his readers an object-lesson of this spiritual battle and moral endeavour, Paul the Apostle used the illustration of the Greek pentathlon in 1 Corinthians 9:24. The exercises are intended to develop and strengthen Christians' moral stamina, while their aim is Christian perfection leading up to their ultimate end: union with God (referred to as the body of Christ within God). According to Catholic theology, human nature has been weakened by original sin and is ever inclining toward what is evil; this end cannot be reached except at the price of overcoming many serious obstacles with God's grace.

The moral struggle involves overcoming spiritual obstacles, specifically the evil desires of the flesh, eyes, and pride of life, which are tests of original sin that try and challenge humanity (Trid., Sess. V, De peccato originali). The first duty, as described by the Apostle Paul in Ephesians 4:22, involves putting off "the old man". Next, he states that one must "put on the new man", which reflects the image of God. A Christian's obligation is to strive to be like Jesus, which requires divine grace. Baptism, whereby God adopts Christians as his children, bestows grace upon Christians through sanctification. Said sanctification must be perfected through supernatural virtues, the seven gifts of the Holy Spirit, and actual grace. Ascetics, at least in Catholicism, is, therefore, the systematic striving for Christian perfection.

=== Nature of Christian perfection ===
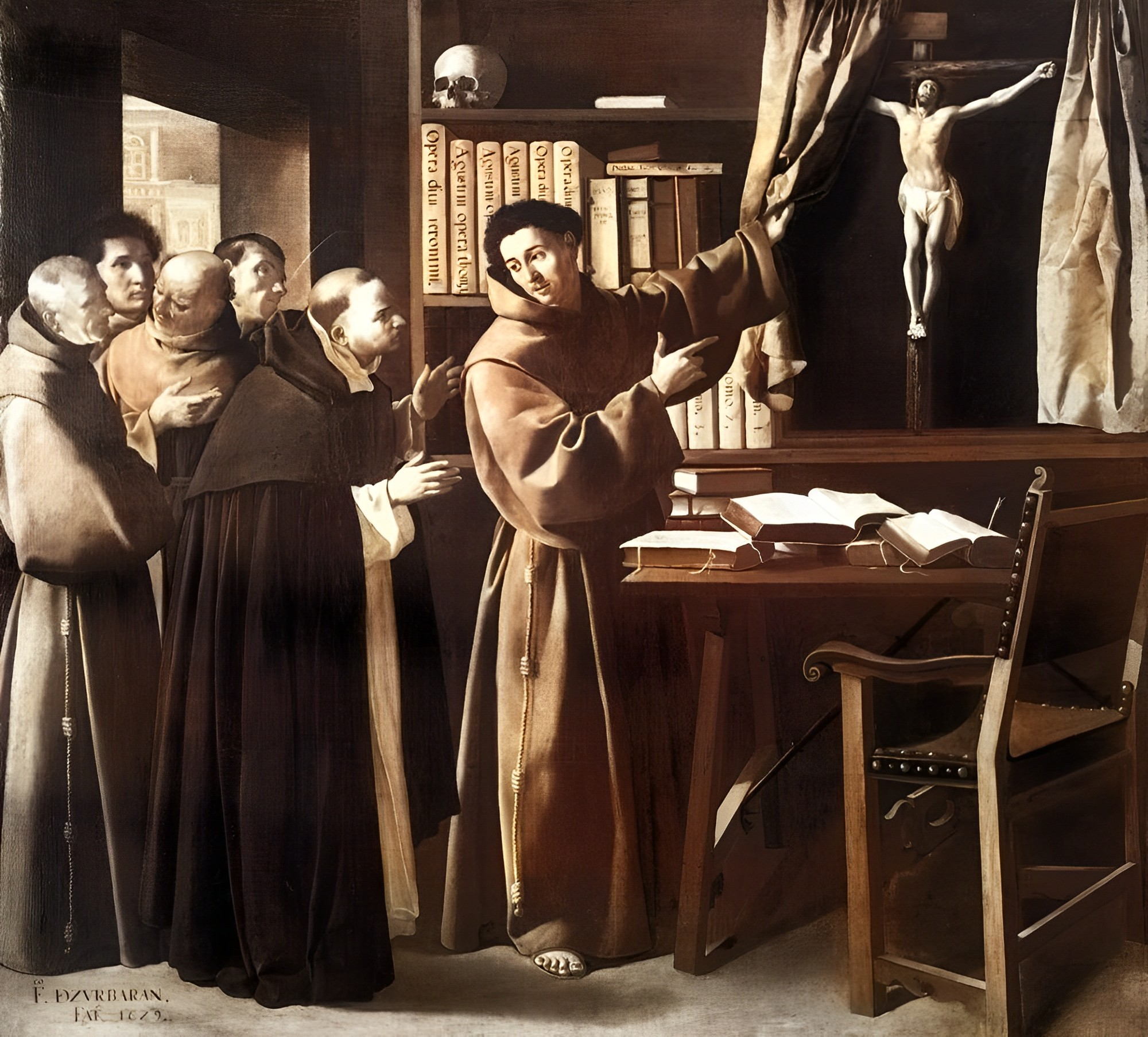
Saint Bonaventure reveals the Crucifix to Saint Thomas Aquinas (1629), by Francisco de Zurbarán.

Catholicism rejects the Protestant conception of essentially negative asceticism and that the correct notion of asceticism was discovered by the Reformers. There can be no doubt as to the Catholic position, clearly voiced by St. Thomas and St. Bonaventure who never tired of repeating that the ideal of asceticism upheld by them was the ideal of the Catholic past, of the Fathers, of Christ Himself, emphatically stating that bodily asceticism has not an absolute, but only a relative, value. St. Thomas calls it a "means to an end", to be used with discretion. St. Bonaventure says that bodily austerities "prepare, foster and preserve perfection" ("Apolog. pauperum", V, c. viii). As proof he shows that to put an absolute value on bodily asceticism would lead to Manichæism. He also points to Christ, the ideal of Christian perfection, who was less austere in fasting than John the Baptist, and to the founders of religious orders, who prescribed fewer ascetic exercises for their communities than they themselves practised (cf. J. Zahn, "Vollkommenheitsideal" in "Moralprobleme", Freiburg, 1911, p. 126 sqq.). On the other hand, Catholics do not deny the importance of ascetic practices for acquiring Christian perfection. Considering the actual condition of human nature, they declare these necessary for the removal of obstacles and for the liberation of man's moral forces, thus claiming for asceticism a positive character. A like value is put upon those exercises which restrain and guide the powers of the soul. Consequently, Catholics actually fulfil and always have fulfilled what Harnack sets down as a demand of the Gospel and what he pretends to have looked for in vain among Catholics; for they do "wage battle against mammon, care, and selfishness, and practise that charity which loves to serve and to sacrifice itself" (Harnack, "Essence of Christianity"). The Catholic ideal, then, is by no means confined to the negative element of asceticism, but is of a positive nature.

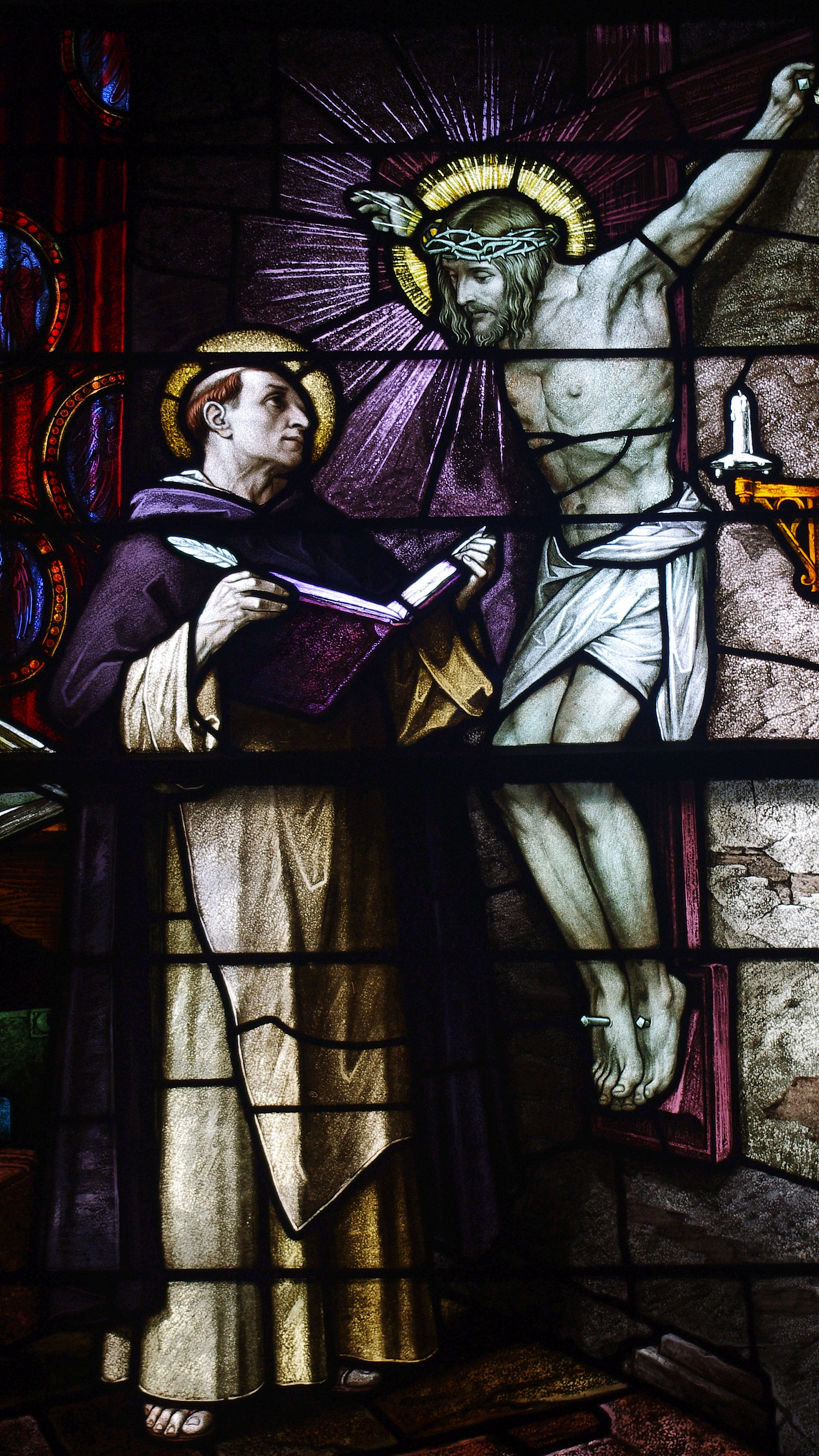
Stained glass depicting Thomas Aquinas at Saint Patrick Church (Columbus, Ohio).

The essence of Christian perfection is love. St. Thomas (Opusc. de perfectione christ., c. ii) calls that perfect which is conformable to its end (quod attingit ad finem ejus). As the end of man is God, what unites him, even on earth, most closely with God is love (1 Corinthians 6:17; 1 John 4:16). All the other virtues are subservient to love or its natural prerequisites, as faith and hope; Love seizes man's whole soul (intellect, will), sanctifies it and fuses new life into it. Love lives in all things and all things live in and through love. Love imparts to all things the right measure and directs them all to the last end. "Love is thus the principle of unity, no matter how diversified are the particular states, vocations and labours. There are many provinces, but they constitute one realm. The organs are many, but the organism is one" (Zahn, l. c., p. 146). Love is therefore rightly called "the bond of perfection" (Colossians 3:14) and the fulfilment of the law (Romans 13:8). That Christian perfection consists in love has ever been the teaching of Catholic ascetical writers. A few testimonies may suffice. Writing to the Corinthians, Clement of Rome says (1 Corinthians 49:1): "It was love that made all the elect perfect; without love nothing is acceptable to God" (en te agape ateleiothesan pantes oi eklektoi tou theou dicha agapes ouden euareston estin to theo; Funk, "Patr. apost.", p. 163). The Epistle of Barnabas insists that the way of light is "the love of him who created us" (agapeseis ton se poiesanta; Funk, l. c., p. 91), "a love of our neighbour that does not even spare our own life" (agapeseis ton plesion sou hyper ten psychen sou), and it affirms that perfection is nothing else than "love and joy over the good works which testify to justice" (agape euphrosyns kai agalliaseos ergon dikaiosynes martyria). St. Ignatius never wearies in his letters of proposing faith as the light and love as the way, love being the end and aim of faith ("Ad Ephes.", ix, xiv; "Ad Philad.", ix; "Ad Smyrn.", vi). According to the "Didache", love of God and of one's neighbour is the beginning of the "way of life" (c. i), and in the "Epistle to Diognetus" active love is called the fruit of belief in Christ. The "Pastor" of Hermas acknowledges the same ideal when he sets down "a life for God" (zoe to theo) as the sum-total of human existence. To these Apostolic Fathers may be added St. Ambrose (De fuga sæculi, c. iv, 17; c. vi, 35–36) and St. Augustine, who regards perfect justice as tantamount to perfect love. Both St. Thomas and St. Bonaventure speak the same language, and the ascetical writers of all subsequent centuries have faithfully followed in their authoritative footsteps (cf. Lutz, "Die kirchl. Lehre von den evang. Räten", Paderborn, 1907, pp. 26–99).

However, though perfection is essentially love, not any degree of love is sufficient to constitute moral perfection. The ethical perfection of the Christian consists in the perfection of love, which requires such a disposition "that we can act with speed and ease even though many obstacles obstruct our path" (Mutz, "Christl. Ascetik", 2nd ed., Paderborn, 1909). But this disposition of the soul supposes that the passions have been subdued; for it is the result of a laborious struggle, in which the moral virtues, steeled by love, force back and quell the evil inclinations and habits, supplanting them by good inclinations and habits. Only then has it really become "a man's second nature, as it were, to prove his love of God at certain times and under certain circumstances, to practise virtue and, as far as human nature may, to preserve his soul even from the slightest taints" (Mutz, l. c., p. 43). Owing to the weakness of human nature and the presence of the evil concupiscence (fomes peccati: Trid., Sess. VI, can. xxiii), a perfection that would exclude every defect cannot be attained in this life without a special privilege (cf. Proverbs 20:9; Ecclesiastes 7:21; James 3:2). Likewise, perfection on this side of the grave will never reach such a degree that further growth is impossible, as is clear from the mind of the Church and the nature of our present existence (status vioe); in other words, our perfection will always be relative. As St. Bernard says: "An unflagging zeal for advancing and a continual struggle for perfection is itself perfection" (Indefessus proficiendi studium et iugis conatus ad perfectionem, perfectio reputatur; "Ep. ccliv ad Abbatem Guarinum"). Since perfection consists in love, it is not the privilege of one particular state, but may be, and has as a fact been, attained in every state of life (cf. Christian and Religious Perfection). Consequently, it would be wrong to identify perfection with the so-called state of perfection and the observance of the evangelical counsels. As St. Thomas rightly observes, there are perfect men outside the religious orders and imperfect men within them (Summa theol., II-II, Q. clxxxiv, a. 4). True it is that the conditions for realizing the ideal of a Christian life are, generally speaking, more favourable in the religious state than in the secular avocations. But not all are called to the religious life, nor would all find in it their contentment. To sum up, the end is the same, the means are different. This sufficiently answers Harnack's objection (Essence of Christianity) that the Church considers the perfect imitation of Christ possible only for the monks, while she accounts the life of a Christian in the world as barely sufficient for the attainment of the last end.

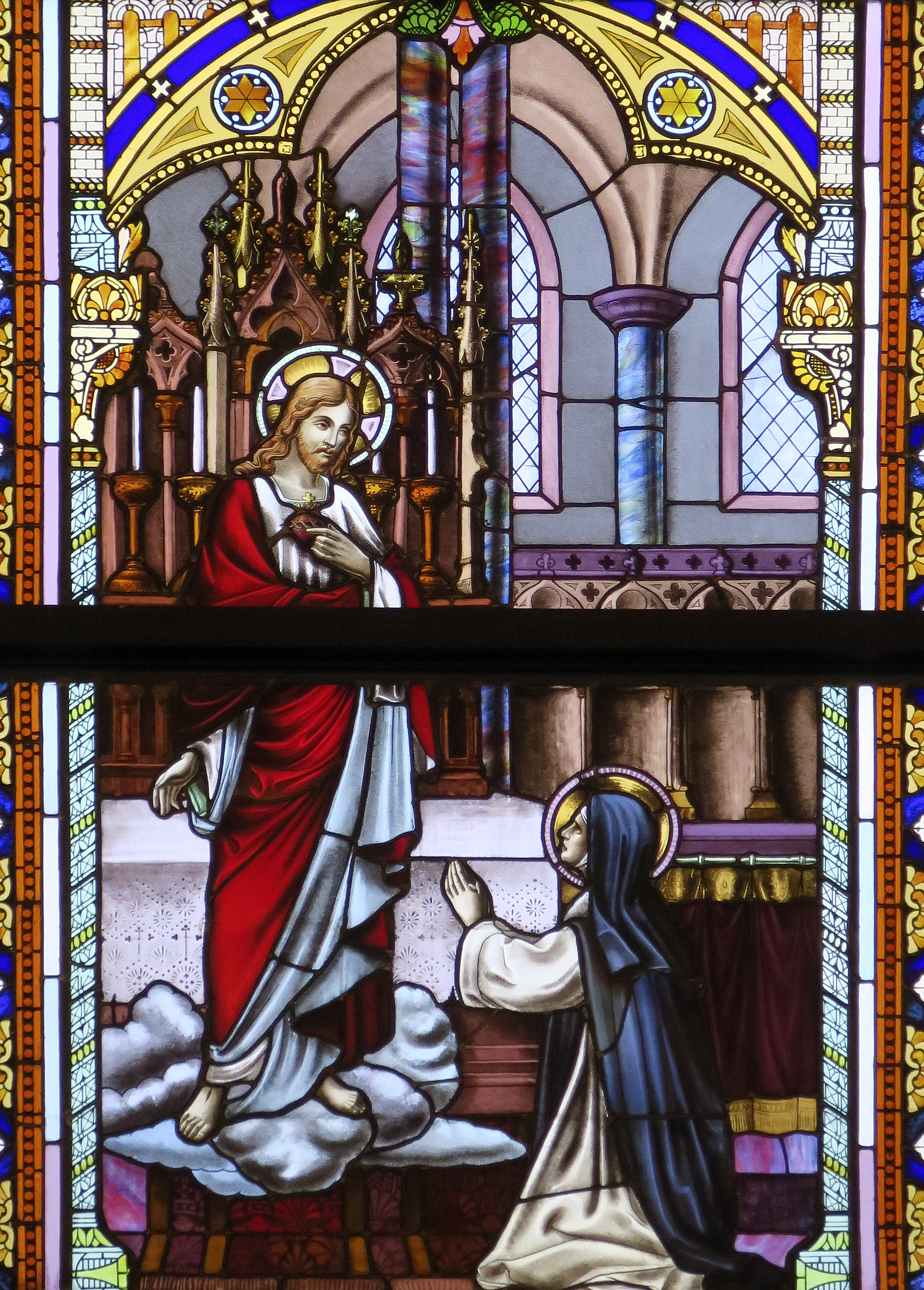
Stained glass depicting Margaret Mary Alacoque's vision of the Sacred Heart of Jesus, at Woodbridge, Ontario.

The ideal, to which the Christian should conform and towards which he should strive with all his powers both natural and supernatural, is Jesus Christ. His whole life should be so penetrated by Christ that he becomes Christian in the full sense of the word ("until Christ be formed in you"; Galatians 4:19). That Christ is the supreme model and pattern of the Christian life follows from Scripture, e. g. from John, xiii, 15, and I Peter, ii, 21, where imitation of Christ is directly recommended, and from John, viii, 12, where Christ is called "the light of the world". Cf. also Rom., viii, 29, Gal., ii, 20, Phil., iii, 8, and Heb., i, 3, where the Apostle extols the excellent knowledge of Jesus Christ, for whom he has suffered the loss of all things, counting them but as dung, that he may gain Christ. Of the numerous testimonies of the Fathers we only quote St. Augustine: "Finis ergo noster perfectio nostra esse debet; perfectio nostra Christus" (P. L., XXXVI, 628; cf. also "In Psalm.", 26, 2, in P. L., XXXVI, 662). In Christ there is no shadow, nothing one-sided. His Divinity guarantees the purity of the model; His humanity, by which He became similar to us, makes the model attractive. But this picture of Christ, unmarred by addition or omission, is to be found only in the Catholic Church and, owing to her indefectibility, will always continue there in its ideal state. For the same reason, the Church alone can give us the guarantee that the ideal of the Christian life will always remain pure and unadulterated, and will not be identified with one particular state or with a subordinate virtue (cf. Zahn, l. c., p. 124). An unprejudiced examination proves that the ideal of Catholic life has been preserved in all its purity through the centuries and that the Church has never failed to correct the false touches with which individuals might have sought to disfigure its unstained beauty. The individual features and the fresh colours for outlining the living picture of Christ are derived from the sources of Revelation and the doctrinal decisions of the Church. These tell us about the internal sanctity of Christ (John 1:14; Colossians 2:9; Hebrews 1:9; etc.). His life overflowing with grace, of whose fulness we have all received (John 1:16), His life of prayer (Mark 1:21, 35; 3:1; Luke 5:16; 6:12; 9:18; etc.), His devotion to His heavenly Father (Matthew 11:26; John 4:34; 5:30; 8:26, 29), His intercourse with men (Matthew 9:10; cf. 1 Corinthians 9:22), His spirit of unselfishness and sacrifice, His patience and meekness, and, finally, His asceticism as revealed in his fastings (Matthew 4:2; 6:18).

=== Dangers ===
The second task of ascetical theology is to point out the dangers which may frustrate the attainment of Christian perfection and to indicate the means by which they can be avoided successfully. The first danger to be noticed is evil concupiscence. A second danger lies in the allurements of the visible creation, which occupy man's heart to the exclusion of the highest good; to the same class belong the enticements of the sinful, corrupt world (1 John 5:19): those men who promulgate vicious and ungodly doctrines and thereby dim or deny man's sublime destiny, or who by perverting ethical concepts and by setting a bad example give a false tendency to man's sensuality. Thirdly, ascetics acquaints not only with the malice of the devil, lest one falls prey to his cunning wiles, but also with his weakness, lest one lose heart. Finally, not satisfied with indicating the general means to be used for waging a victorious combat, ascetics offers particular remedies for special temptations (cf. Mutz, "Ascetik", 2nd ed., p. 107 sqq.).

=== Means for realizing the Christian ideal ===
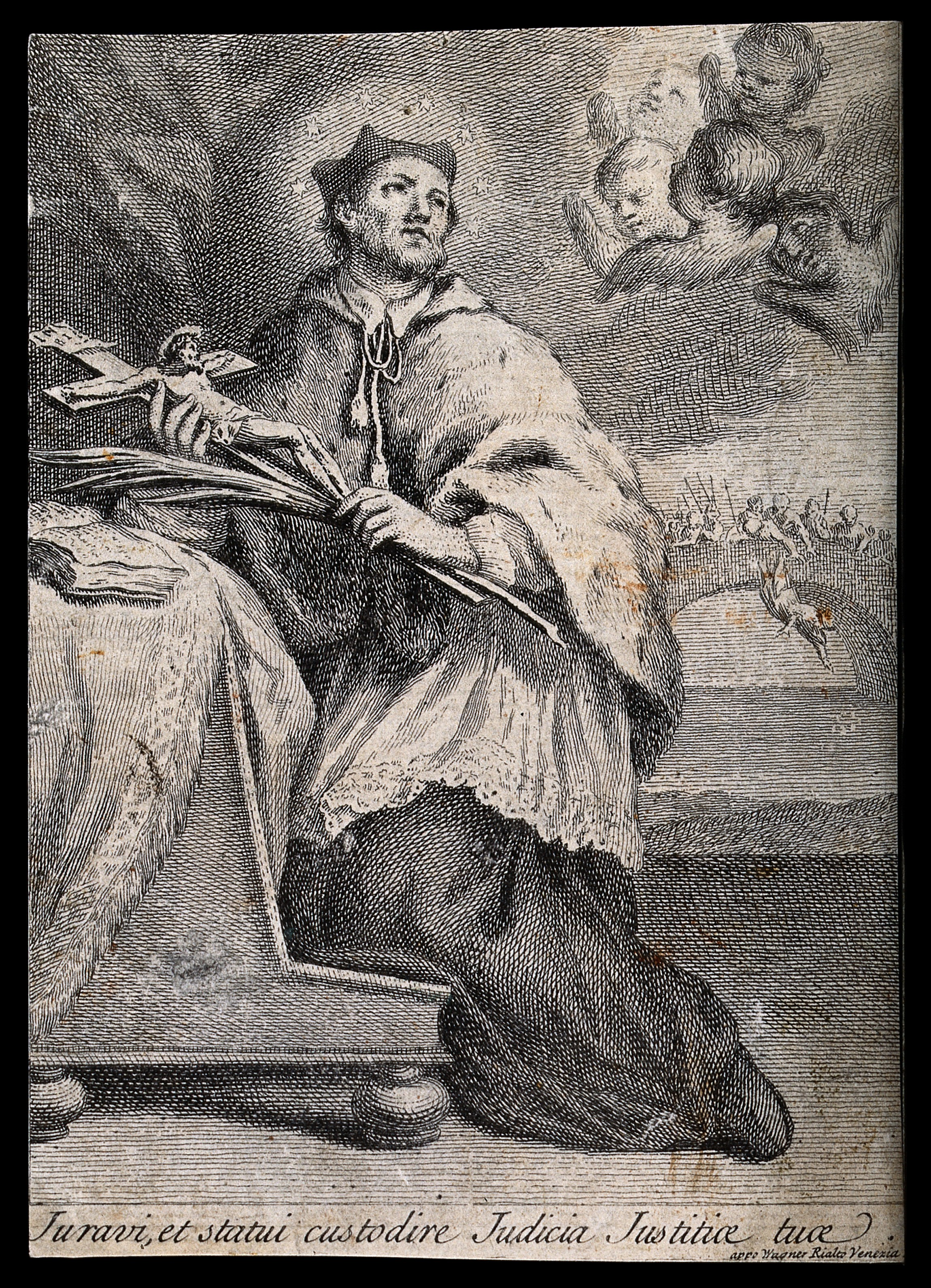
Ignatius of Loyola, on an engraving by Wagner.

Prayer, above all, in its stricter meaning, is a means of attaining perfection; special devotions approved by the Church and the sacramental means of sanctification have a special reference to the striving after perfection (frequent confession and communion). Ascetics proves the necessity of prayer (2 Corinthians 3:5) and teaches the mode of praying with spiritual profit; it justifies vocal prayers and teaches the art of meditating according to the various methods of St. Peter of Alcantara, of St. Ignatius, and other saints, especially the "tres modi orandi" of St. Ignatius. An important place is assigned to the examination of conscience, because ascetical life wanes or waxes with its neglect or careful performance; without this regular practice, a thorough purification of the soul and progress in spiritual life are out of the question. It centres the searchlight of the interior vision on every single action: all sins, whether committed with full consciousness or only half voluntarily, even the negligences which, though not sinful, lessen the perfection of the act, all are carefully scrutinized (peccata, offensiones, negligentioe; cf. "Exercitia spiritualia" of St. Ignatius, ed. P. Roothaan, p. 3). Ascetics distinguishes a twofold examination of conscience: one general (examen generale), the other special (examen particulare), giving at the same time directions how both kinds may be made profitable by means of certain practical and psychological aids. The general examination recalls all the faults of one day; the particular, on the contrary, focusses on one single defect and marks its frequency, or on one virtue to augment the number of its acts.

Ascetics encourages visits to the Blessed Sacrament (visitatio sanctissimi), a practice meant especially to nourish and strengthen the divine virtues of faith, hope and charity. It also inculcates the veneration of the saints, whose virtuous lives should spur us on to imitation. It is plain that imitation cannot mean an exact copying. What ascetics proposes as the most natural method of imitation is the removal or at least the lessening of the contrast existing between our own lives and the lives of the saints, the perfecting, as far as is possible, of human virtues, with due regard to personal disposition and the surrounding circumstances of time and place. On the other hand, the observation that some saints are more to be admired than imitated must not lead into the mistake of letting one's works be weighted with the ballast of human comfort and ease, at last looking with suspicion on every heroic act, as though it were something that transcended one's own energy and could not be reconciled with the present circumstances. Such a suspicion would be justified only if the heroic act could not at all be made to harmonize with the preceding development of interior life. The Blessed Mother of God is, after Christ, the most sublime ideal. No one has received grace in such fulness, no one has co-operated with grace so faithfully as she, so the Church praises her as the Mirror of Justice (speculum justitioe). The mere thought of her transcendent purity suffices to repel the alluring charms of sin and to inspire pleasure in the wonderful lustre of virtue.

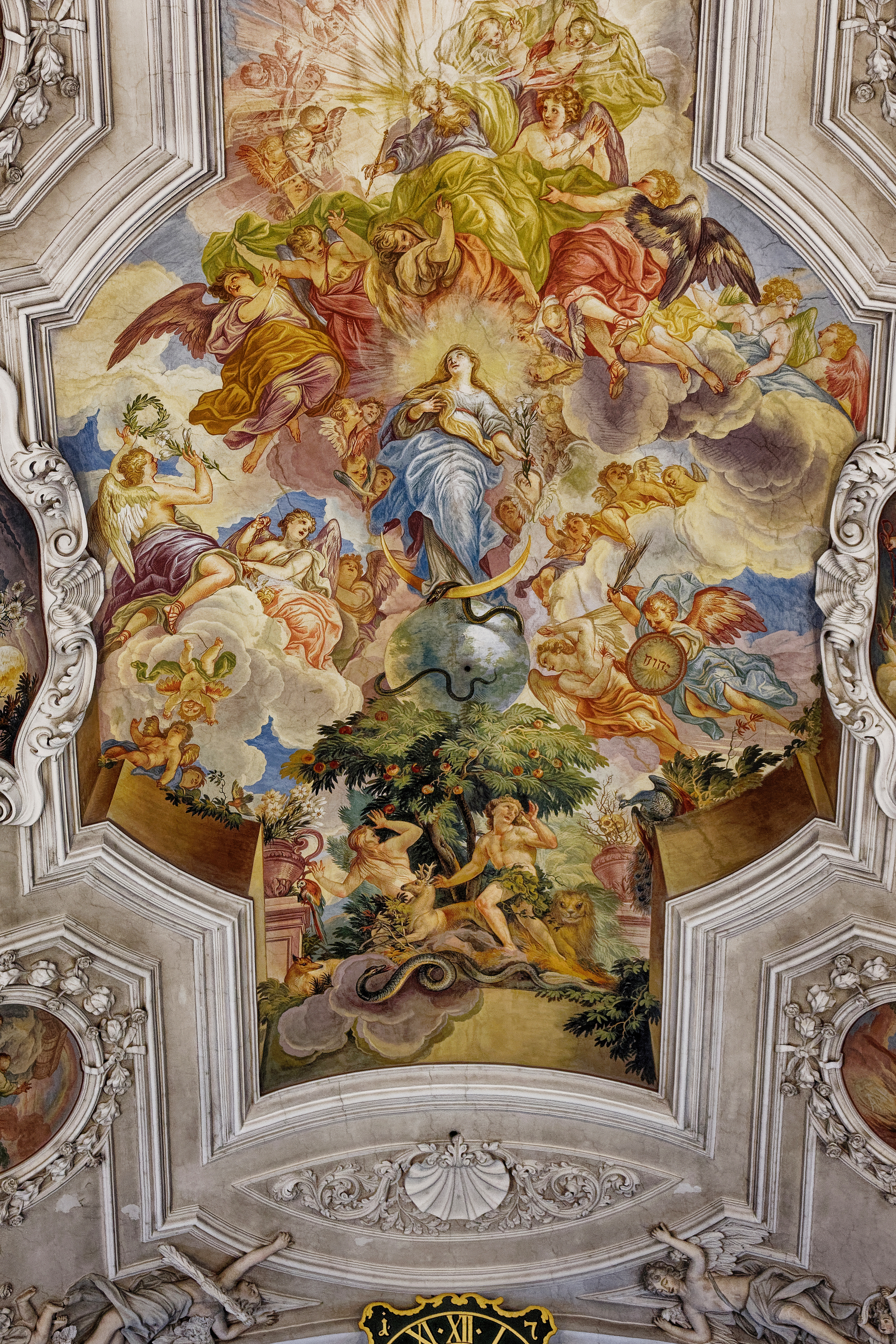
1715 depiction of the Virgin Mary as a link between Heaven and Earth at Ellwangen.

Self-denial is the second means which ascetics teaches us (cf. Matthew 16:24-25). Without it the combat between spirit and flesh, which are contrary to each other (Romans 7:23; 1 Corinthians 9:27; Galatians 5:17), will not lead to the victory of the spirit (Imitatio Christi, I, xxv). How far self-denial should extend is clear from the actual condition of human nature after the fall of Adam. The inclination to sin dominates both the will and the lower appetites; not only the intellect, but also the outer and the inner senses are made subservient to this evil propensity. Hence, self-denial and self-control must extend to all these faculties. Ascetics reduces self-denial to exterior and interior mortification: exterior mortification is the mortification of sensuality and the senses; interior mortification consists in the purification of the faculties of the soul (memory, imagination, intellect, will) and the mastering of the passions. However, the term "mortification" must not be taken to mean the stunting of the "strong, full, healthy" (Schell) life; what it aims at is that the sensual passions do not gain the upper hand over the will. It is precisely through taming the passions by means of mortification and self-denial that life and energy are strengthened and freed from cumbersome shackles. But while the masters of asceticism recognize the necessity of mortification and self-denial, far from deeming it "criminal to assume voluntary sufferings" (Seeberg), they are just as far from advocating the so-called "non-sensual" tendency which, looking upon the body and its life as a necessary evil, proposes to avert its noxious effects by wilful weakening or even mutilation (cf. Schneider, "Göttliche Weltordnung u. religionslose Sittlichkeit", Paderborn, 1900, p. 537). On the other hand, Catholics reject the gospel of "healthy sensuality", which is only a pretty-sounding title, invented to cloak unrestricted concupiscence.

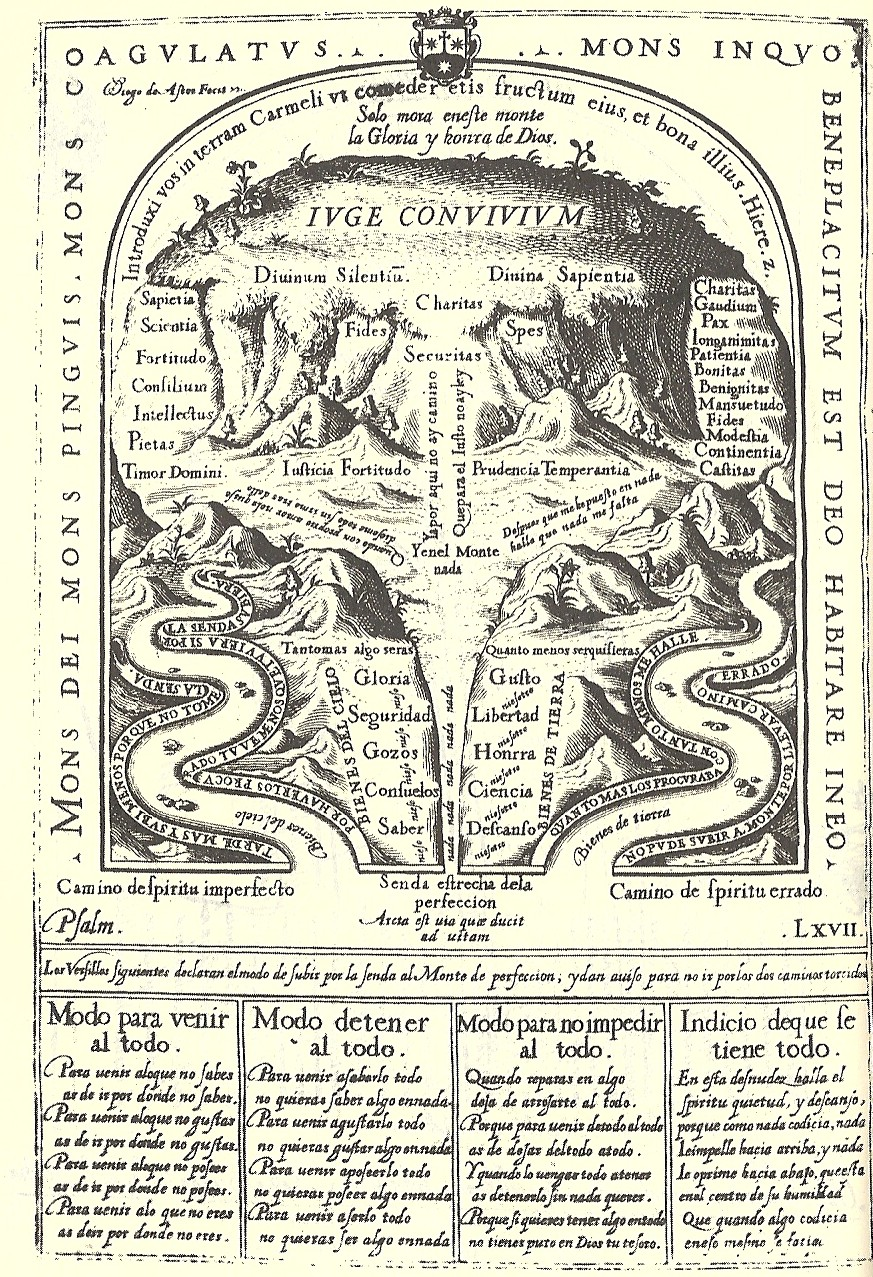
Mount Carmel, engraving based on a draft by John of the Cross. Mystical ascension is depicted as the hiking of a mountain, and virtues, passions and vices are shown as part of the mount.

Special attention is devoted to the mastering of the passions, because with them above all else the moral combat must be waged most relentlessly. Scholastic philosophy enumerates as passions: love, hatred, desire, horror, joy, sadness, hope, despair, boldness, fear, anger. Starting from the Christian idea that the passions (passiones, as understood by St. Thomas) are inherent in human nature, ascetics affirms that they are neither sicknesses, as the Stoics, the Reformers and Kant maintain, nor yet harmless as was asserted by the Humanists and Rousseau who denied original sin. On the contrary, it insists that in themselves they are indifferent, may be employed for good and for evil and receive a moral character only by the use to which the will puts them. It is the purpose of ascetics to point out the ways and means by which these passions can be tamed and mastered, so that, instead of goading the will to sin, they are made welcome allies for the accomplishment of good. And since the passions are inordinate in as far as they turn to illicit things or exceed the necessary bounds in those things which are licit, ascetics teaches how to render them innocuous by averting or restraining them, or by turning them to loftier purposes.

Labour also is subservient to the striving after perfection. Untiring labour runs counter to human corrupt nature, which loves ease and comfort. Hence well-ordered, persistent and purposeful labour implies self-denial. This is why the Catholic Church has always looked upon labour, both manual and mental, as an ascetic means of no small value (cfr. Cassian, "De instit. coenob.", X, 24; St. Benedicts Rule, xlviii, li; Basil, "Reg. fusius tract." c. xxxvii, 1–3; "Reg. brevius tract.", c. lxxii; Origen, Contra Celsum, I, 28). St. Basil even holds that piety and avoidance of labour are irreconcilable in the Christian ideal of life (cf. Mausbach, "Die Ethik des hl. Augustinus", 1909, p. 264).

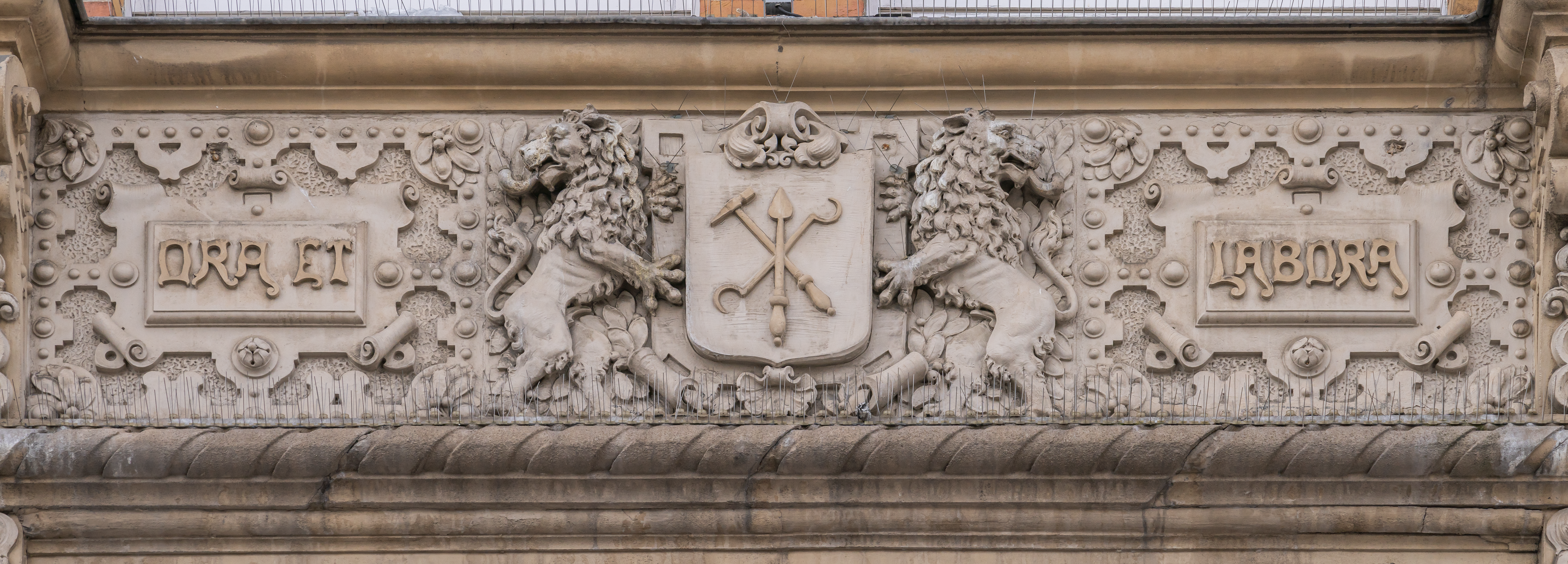
Ora et labora lettering on an old facade, created c. 1901.

Suffering too is an integral constituent of the Christian ideal and pertains consequently to ascetics, but its real value appears only in the light of faith, which teaches us that suffering makes us like unto Christ, we being the members of the mystic body of which He is the head (1 Peter 2:21), that suffering is the channel of grace which heals (sanat), preserves (conservat) and tests (probat). Finally ascetics teaches us how to turn sufferings into channels of heavenly grace.

The Virtues are subjected to a thorough discussion. As is proved in dogmatic theology, our soul receives in justification supernatural habits, not only the three Divine, but also the moral virtues (Trid., Sess. VI, De justit., c. vi; Cat. Rom., p. 2, c. 2, n. 51). These supernatural powers (virtutes infusoe) are joined to the natural faculties or the acquired virtues (virtutes acguisitoe), constituting with them one principle of action. It is the task of ascetics to show how the virtues, taking into account the obstacles and means mentioned, can be reduced to practice in the actual life of the Christian, so that love be perfected and the image of Christ receive perfect shape in us. Conformable to the Brief of Leo XIII, "Testem benevolentiæ" of 22 January 1899, ascetics insists that the so-called "passive" virtues (meekness, humility, obedience, patience) must never be set aside in favour of the "active" virtues (devotion to duty, scientific activity, social and civilizing labour) which would be tantamount to denying that Christ is the perpetual model. Rather, both kinds must be harmoniously joined in the life of the Christian. True imitation of Christ is never a brake, nor does it blunt the initiative in any field of human endeavour, but the practice of the passive virtues is a support and aid to true activity. Besides, it not rarely happens that the passive virtues reveal a higher degree of moral energy than the active. The Brief itself refers to Matt., xxi, 29; Rom., viii, 29; Gal., v, 24; Phil., ii, 8; Heb., xiii, 8 (cf. also Zahn, l. c., 166 sqq.).

=== Application of the means in the three degrees of Christian perfection ===
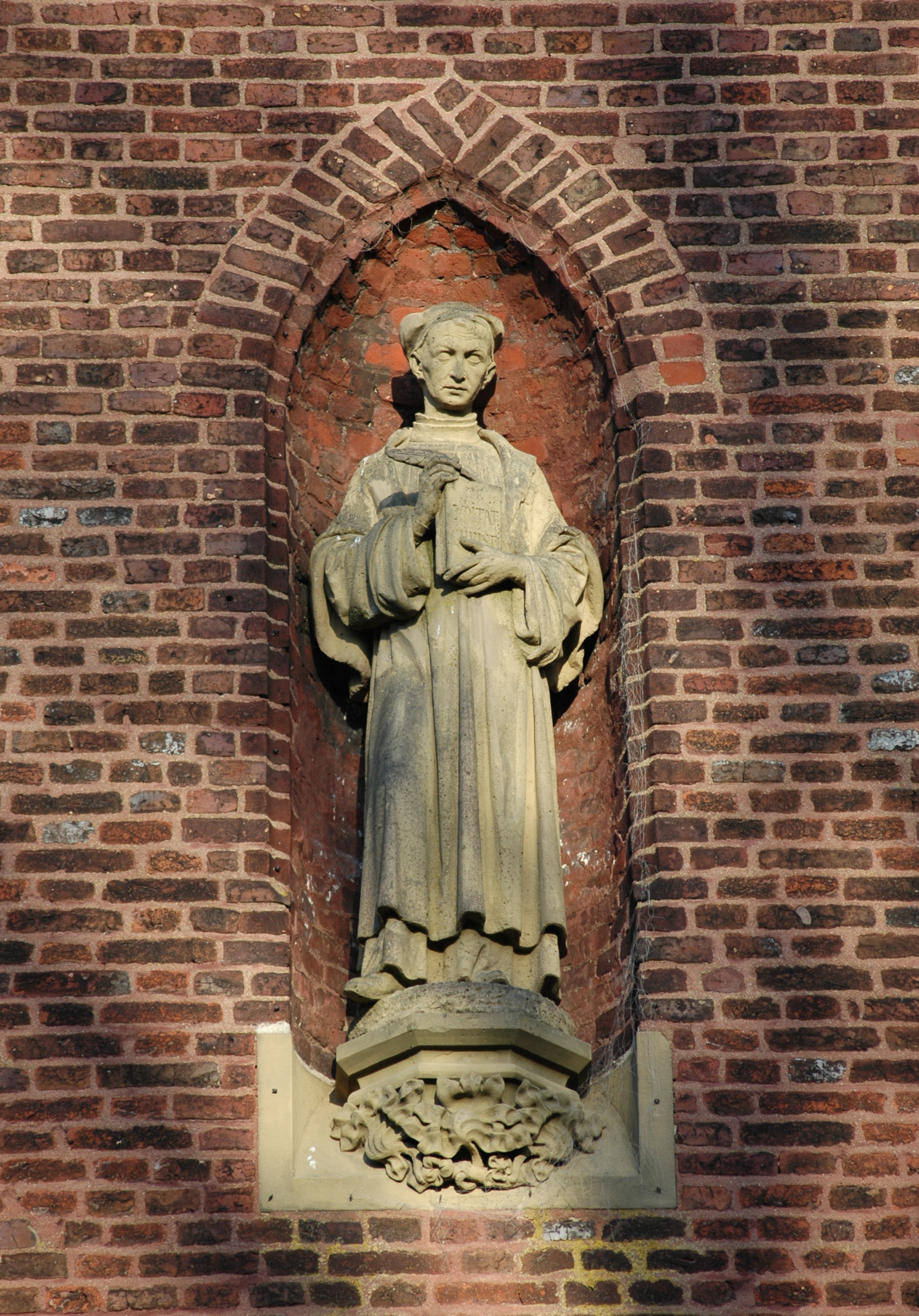
Statue of Thomas à Kempis, author of The Imitation of Christ, at his birth town.

Imitation of Christ is the duty of all who strive after perfection. It lies in the very nature of this formation after the image of Christ that the process is gradual and must follow the laws of moral energy; for moral perfection is the terminus of a laborious journey, the crown of a hard-fought battle. Ascetics divides those who strive after perfection into three groups: the beginners, the advanced, the perfect; and correspondingly sets down three stages or ways of Christian perfection: the purgative way, the illuminative way, the unitive way. The means stated above are applied with more or less diversity according to the stage which the Christian has reached.

In the purgative way, when the appetites and inordinate passions still possess considerable strength, mortification and self-denial are to be practised more extensively. For the seeds of the spiritual life will not sprout unless the tares and thistles have first been weeded out. In the illuminative way, when the mists of passion have been lifted to a great extent, meditation and the practice of virtues in imitation of Christ are to be insisted on. During the last stage, the unitive way, the soul must be confirmed and perfected in conformity with God's will ("And I live, now not I; but Christ liveth in me": Galatians 2:20).

One may not to mistake the three stages for wholly separate portions of the striving after virtue and perfection. Even in the second and the third stages there occur at times violent struggles, while the joy of being united with God may sometimes be granted in the initial stage as an inducement for further advance (cf. Mutz, "Aszetik," 2nd ed., 94 sq.).

=== Relation of ascetics to moral theology and mysticism ===
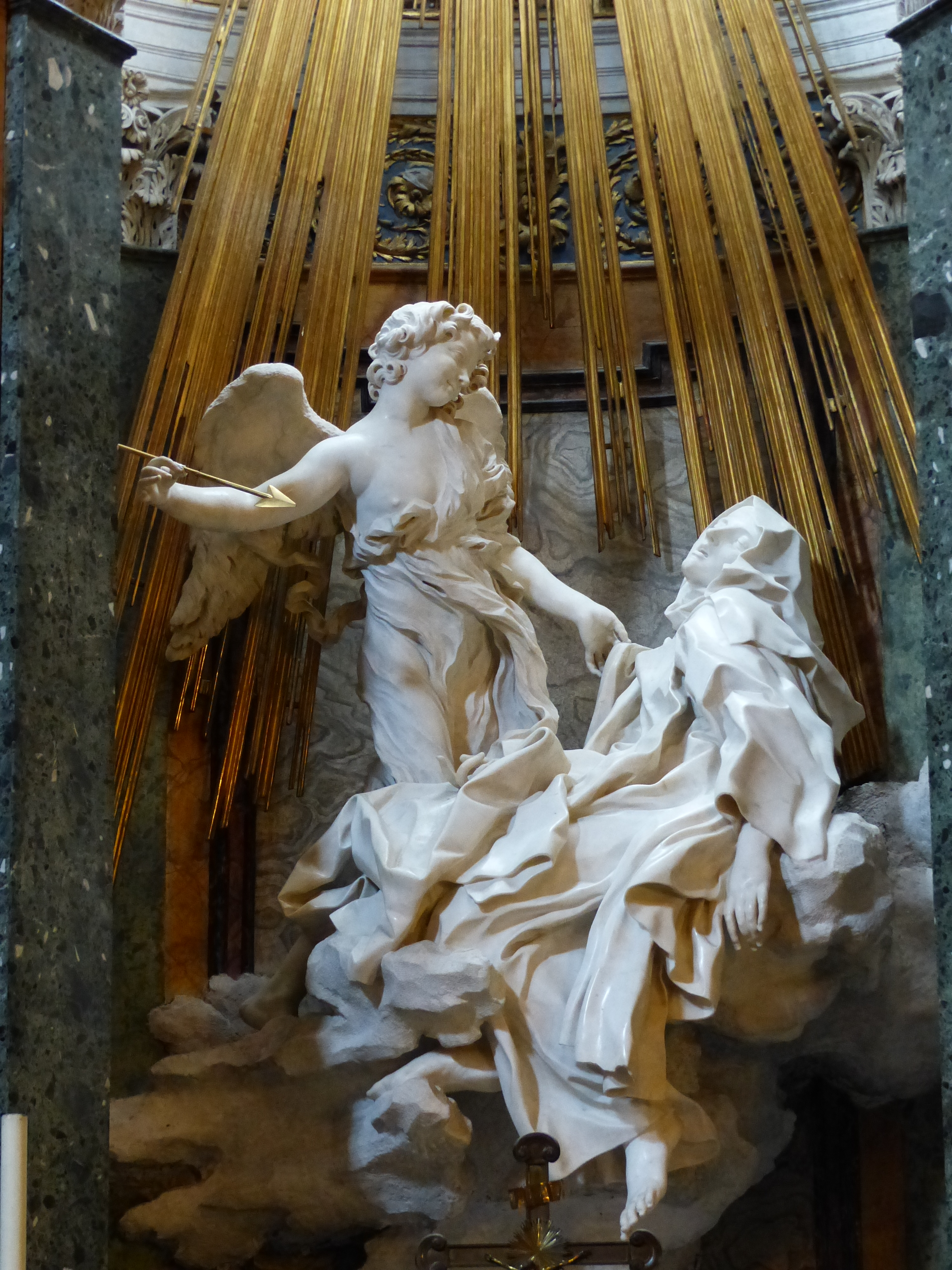
Ecstasy of Saint Teresa (1675), by Gian Lorenzo Bernini. The transverberation of Teresa of Ávila is one of the most iconic mystical experiences in Roman Catholicism.

All these disciplines are concerned with the Christian life and its last end in the next world; but they differ, though not totally, in their mode of treatment. Ascetical theology, separated from moral theology and mysticism, has for its subject-matter the striving after Christian perfection; it shows how Christian perfection may be attained by earnestly exercising and schooling the will, using the specified means both to avoid the dangers and allurements of sin and to practise virtue with greater intensity. Moral theology is the doctrine of the duties, and in discussing the virtues is satisfied with a scientific exposition.

Mysticism treats essentially of "union with God" and of the extraordinary, so-called mystic prayer. Though also those phenomena which are accidental to mysticism, such as ecstasy, vision, revelation, fall within its scope, yet they are by no means essential to the mystic life (cf. Zahn, "Einführung in die christl. Mystik", Paderborn, 1908). While mysticism includes also matter of ascetics, such as the endeavour of purification, vocal prayer, etc. this is only done because these exercises are looked upon as preparatory to the mystical life and must not be discarded even in its highest stage. Nevertheless, the mystical life is not merely a higher degree of the ascetical life, but differs from it essentially, the mystical life being a special grace granted to the Christian without any immediate merit on his part.

=== Historical development ===
==== Bible ====
Abounds in practical instructions for the life of Christian perfection. Christ himself has drawn its outlines both as to its negative and positive requirements. His imitation is the supreme law (John 8:12; 12:26), charity the first commandment (Matthew 22:36-38; John 15:17); the right intention imparts value to the exterior works (Matthew 5–7), while self-denial and the carrying of the cross are the conditions for His discipleship (Matthew 10:38; 16:24; Mark 8:34; Luke 9:23; 14:27).

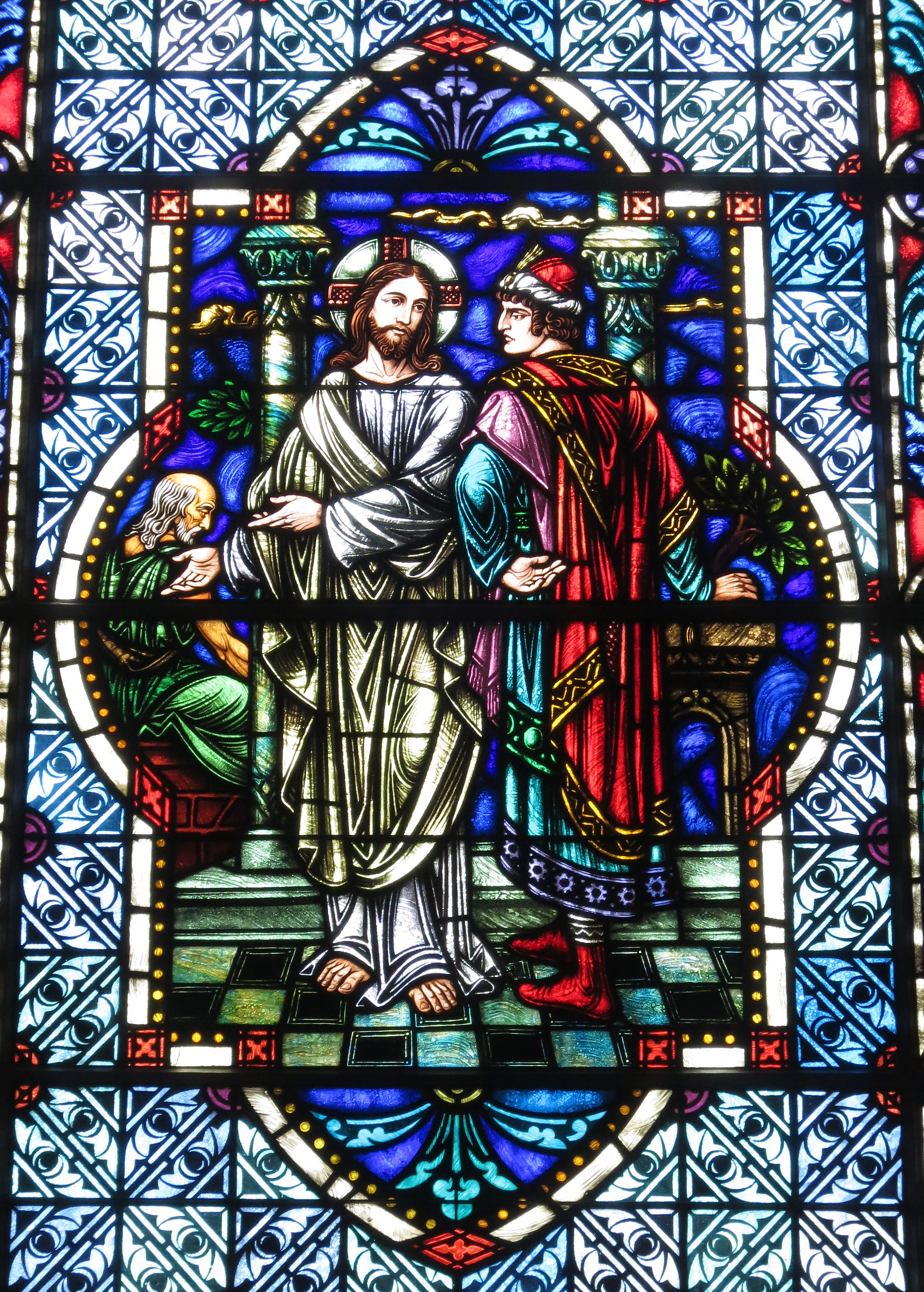
Jesus and the rich young man, depicted on a stained glass at the Cathedral of Saint Patrick (Charlotte, North Carolina). This scene gives the name to the counsels of perfection or evangelical counsels.

Both by His own example (Matthew 4:2) and His exhortations (Matthew 17:20; Mark 9:28) Christ recommended fasting. He inculcated sobriety, watchfulness and prayer (Matthew 24:42; 25:13; 26:41; Mark 13:37; 14:37). He pointed to poverty as a means of gaining the kingdom of heaven (Matthew 6:19; 13:22; Luke 6:20; 8:14; 12:33; etc.) and counselled the rich youth to relinquish everything and to follow Him (Matthew 19:21). That this was a counsel and not a strict command, given in view of the particular attachment of the youth to the things of this world, is shown by the very fact that the Master had twice said "keep the commandments", and that he recommended the renunciation of all earthly goods only on the renewed inquiry after the means that lead to perfection (cf. Lutz, l. c., against the Protestants Th. Zahn, Bern, Weiss, Lemme, and others). Celibacy for God's sake was praised by Christ as worthy of a special heavenly reward (Matthew 19:12). Yet marriage is not condemned, but the words, "All men take not this word, but they to whom it is given", imply that it is the ordinary state, celibacy for God's sake being merely a counsel. Indirectly, Christ also commended voluntary obedience as a means for attaining the most intimate union with God (Matthew 18:4; 20:22, 25).

What Christ outlined in his teachings the Apostles continued to develop. Especially St. Paul of Tarsus brings the two elements of Christian asceticism out in well-defined terms: mortification of inordinate desires as the negative element (Romans 6:8, 13; 2 Corinthians 4:16; Galatians 5:24; Colossians 3:5), union with God in all thoughts, words and deeds (1 Corinthians 10:31; Galatians 6:14; Colossians 3:3-17), and active love of God and once neighbour (Romans 8:35; 1 Corinthians 13:3) as the positive element.

==== Fathers and Doctors of the Church ====
With the Bible as a basis, the Fathers and Doctors of the Church explained particular features of the Christian life in a more coherent and detailed manner. The Apostolic Fathers called the love of God and man the sun of Christian life which, animating all virtues with its vital rays, inspires contempt of the world, beneficence, immaculate purity and self-sacrifice. The "Didache", which was intended to serve as a manual for catechumens, thus describes the way of life: "First, thou shalt love God, who created thee; secondly, thou shalt love thy neighbour as thyself; whatever thou wishest that it should not be done to thee, do not to others."

Following probably the "Didache", the "Epistle of Barnabas", written at the end of the 2nd century, represents the Christian life under the figure of the two ways, that of light and that of darkness. Two Epistles, purporting to come from the pen of St. Clement, but probably written in the 3rd century, exalt the life of virginity, if grounded on the love of God and accompanied by the corresponding works, as heavenly, divine and angelic. St. Polycarp says that St. Ignatius of Antioch's letters contain "faith and patience and all edification in the Lord"; the "Pastor" of Hermas in the twelve commandments inculcates simplicity, truthfulness, chastity, meekness, patience, continence, confidence in God and perpetual struggle against concupiscence.

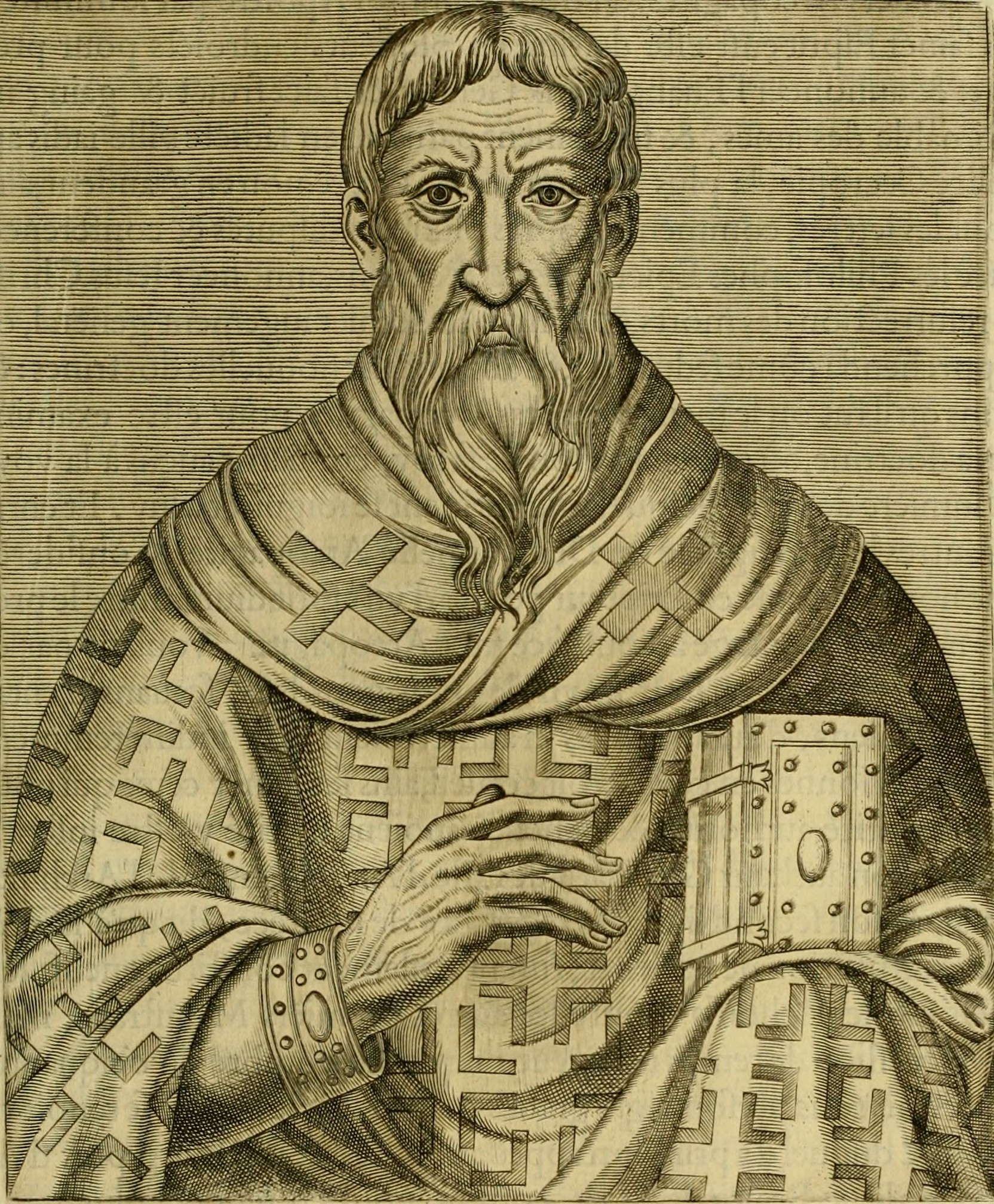
Portrait of Pseudo-Dionysius the Areopagite at Les vrais pourtraits et vies des hommes illustres grecz, latins et payens, 1587.

With the 3rd century the works on Christian asceticism began to show a more scientific character. The writings of Clement of Alexandria and Gregory the Great ("Moral.", XXXIII, c. xxvii; cf. also Cassian, "Coll", IX, XV) show traces of the threefold degree which was afterwards systematically developed by Dionysius the Areopagite. In his "Stromata" Clement sets forth the full beauty and grandeur of "true philosophy". Remarkably this author delineates, even in its details, what is now known as ethical culture, and endeavours to harmonize it with the example given by Christ. The life of the Christian is to be ruled in all things by temperance. Following out this idea, he discusses in a casuistic form food and drink, dress and love of finery, bodily exercises and social conduct.

From the 4th century, a twofold line of thought is discernible in the works on Christian life: one speculative, laying stress on the union of the soul with God, the Absolute Truth and Goodness; the other practical, aiming principally at instruction in the practice of the Christian virtues. The speculative element prevailed in the mystical school, which owes its systematic development to Pseudo-Dionysius and which reached its highest perfection in the 14th century. The practical element was emphasized in the ascetical school with St. Augustine as its chief representative, in whose footsteps followed Gregory the Great and Bernard of Clairvaux.

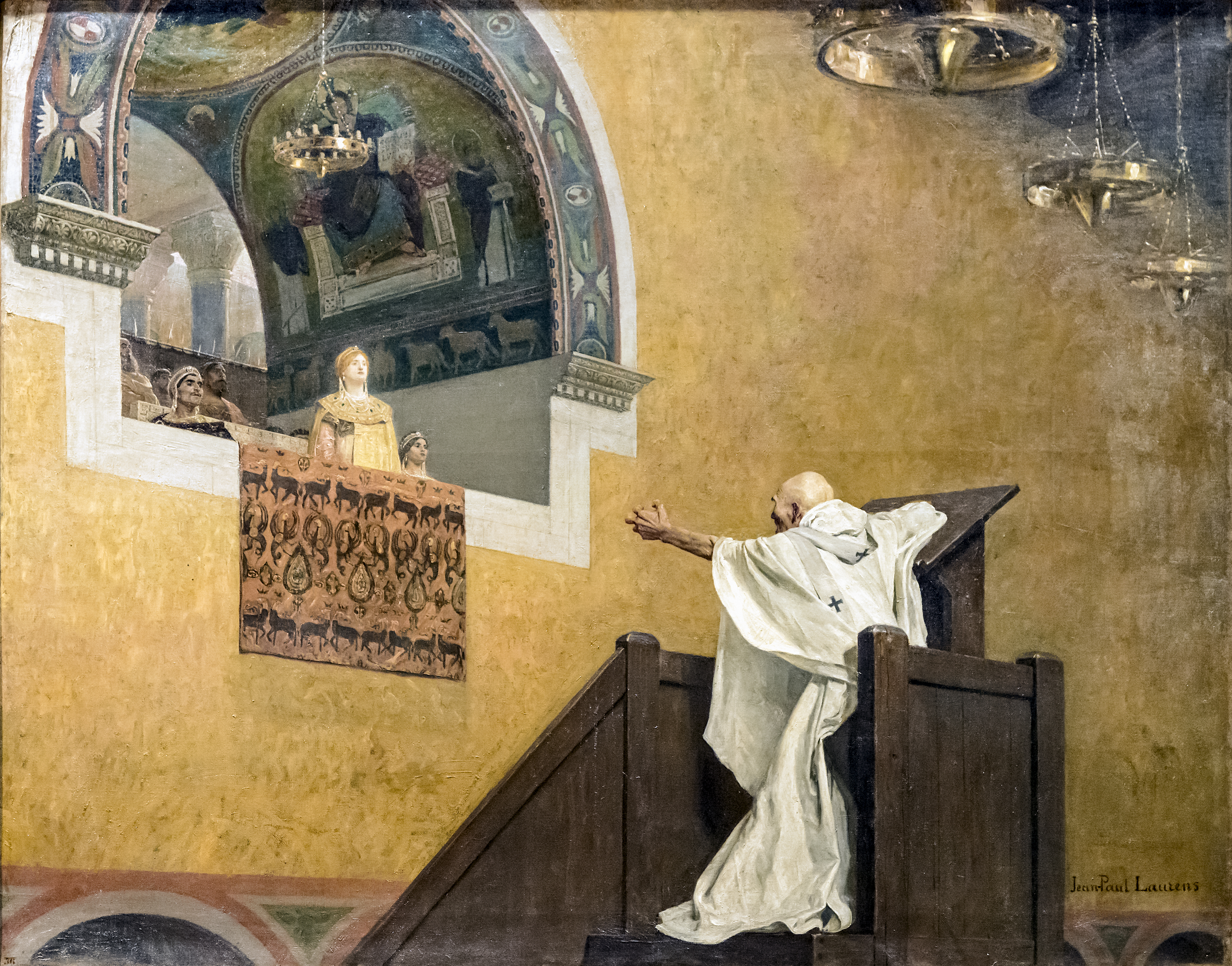
John Chrysostom confronting empress Eudoxia on an anticlerical painting by Jean-Paul Laurens.

It may suffice to detail the principal points on which the writers prior to the medieval-scholastic period dwelt in their instructions. On prayer we have the works of Macarius the Egyptian (d. 385) and of Tertullian (d. after 220), who supplemented his treatise on prayer in general by an explanation of the Lord's Prayer. Cyprian of Carthage (d. 258) wrote "De oratione dominica", and St. Chrysostom (d. 407). Penance and the spirit of penance were treated by Tertullian (De poenitentia), John Chrysostom ("De compunctione cordis", "De poenitentia") and Cyril of Jerusalem (d. 386) in his second catechetical instruction. That the life of the Christian is a warfare is amply illustrated in St. Augustine's (d. 430) "De agone christiano" and "Confessions".

Chastity and virginity were treated by Methodius of Olympus (d. 311) in his "Convivium", in which ten virgins, discussing virginity, demonstrate the moral superiority of Christianity over the ethical tenets of pagan philosophy. The same subject is discussed by the following Fathers: Cyprian (d. 258); Gregory of Nyssa (d. 394) in his "De virginitate"; Ambrose (d. 397), the indefatigable eulogist and champion of the virginal life; Jerome in his "Adversus Helvidium de virginitate" and "Ad Eustachium"; Chrysostom (d. 407) in his "De virginitate", who, though extolling virginity as a heavenly life, yet recommends it only as a counsel; Augustine in his works "De continentia", "De virginitate", "De bono viduitatis".

On patience we have the works of Cyprian, Augustine and Tertullian's "De patientia", in which he speaks of this virtue as an invalid might speak of health to console himself. Chrysostom's "De jejunio et eleemosyna" discusses fasting. Almsgiving and good works are encouraged in Cyprian's "De opere et eleemosynis" and in Augustine's "De fide et operibus". The value of labour is explained in "De opere monachorum" by St. Augustine.

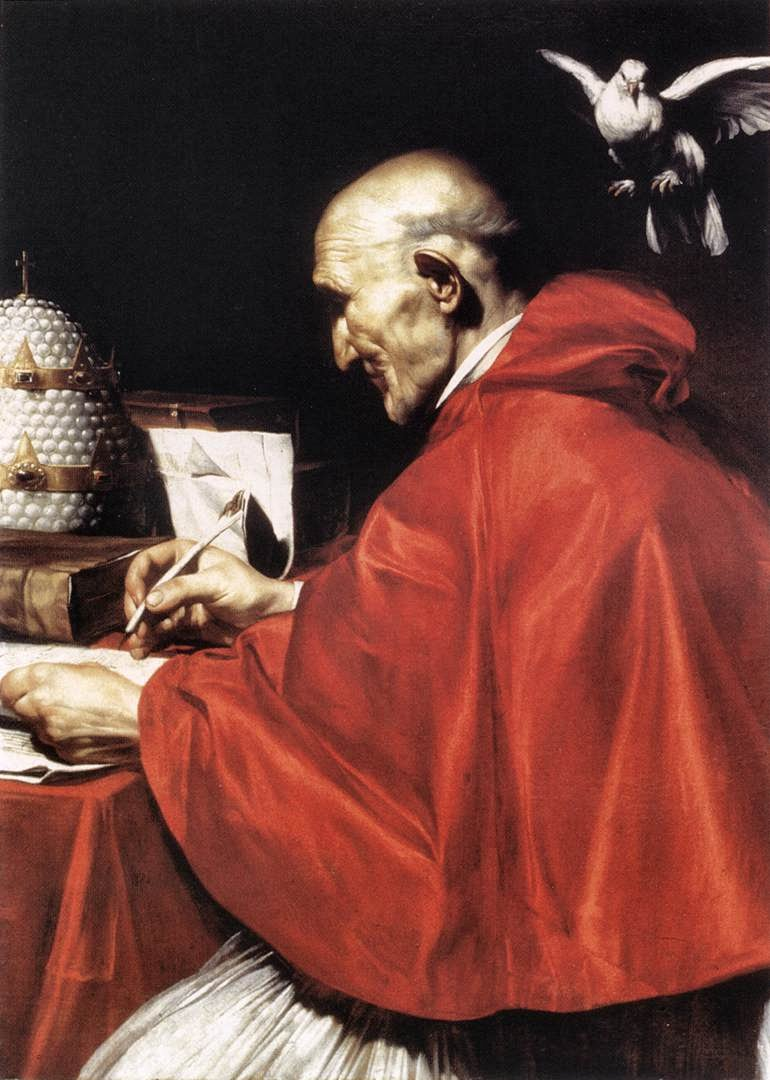
Saint Gregory the Great (c. 1614), by Jusepe de Ribera.

Nor are treatises on the different states of life wanting. Thus St. Augustine's "De bono conjugali" treats of the married state; his "De bono viduitatis" of widowhood. A frequent subject was the priesthood. Gregory of Nazianzus, in his "De fuga", treats of the dignity and responsibility of the priesthood; Chrysostom's "De sacerdotio" exalts the sublimity of this state with surpassing excellence; St. Ambrose in his "De officiis", while speaking of the four cardinal virtues, admonishes the clerics that their lives should be an illustrious example; St. Jerome's "Epistola ad Nepotianum" discusses the dangers to which priests are exposed; the "Regula pastoralis" of Gregory the Great inculcates the prudence indispensable to the pastor in his dealings with different classes of men. Of prime importance for the monastic life was the work "De institutis coenobiorum" of Cassian.

But the standard work from the 8th to the 13th century was the Rule of St. Benedict, which found numerous commentators. Of the saint or rather his Rule St. Bernard says: "lpse dux noster, ipse magister et legifer noster est" (Serm. in Nat. S. Bened., n. 2). Illustrations of the practice of Christian virtues in general were the "Expositio in beatum Job" of pope Gregory the Great and the "Collationes Patrum" of Cassian, in which the various elements of Christian perfection were discussed in the form of dialogues.

==== Medieval-Scholastic period ====
The transition period up to the 12th century exhibits no specially noteworthy advance in ascetical literature. To the endeavour to gather and preserve the teachings of the Fathers we owe Alcuin's "De virtutibus et vitiis". But when in the 12th century speculative theology was celebrating its triumphs, mystical and ascetical theology too showed a healthy activity.

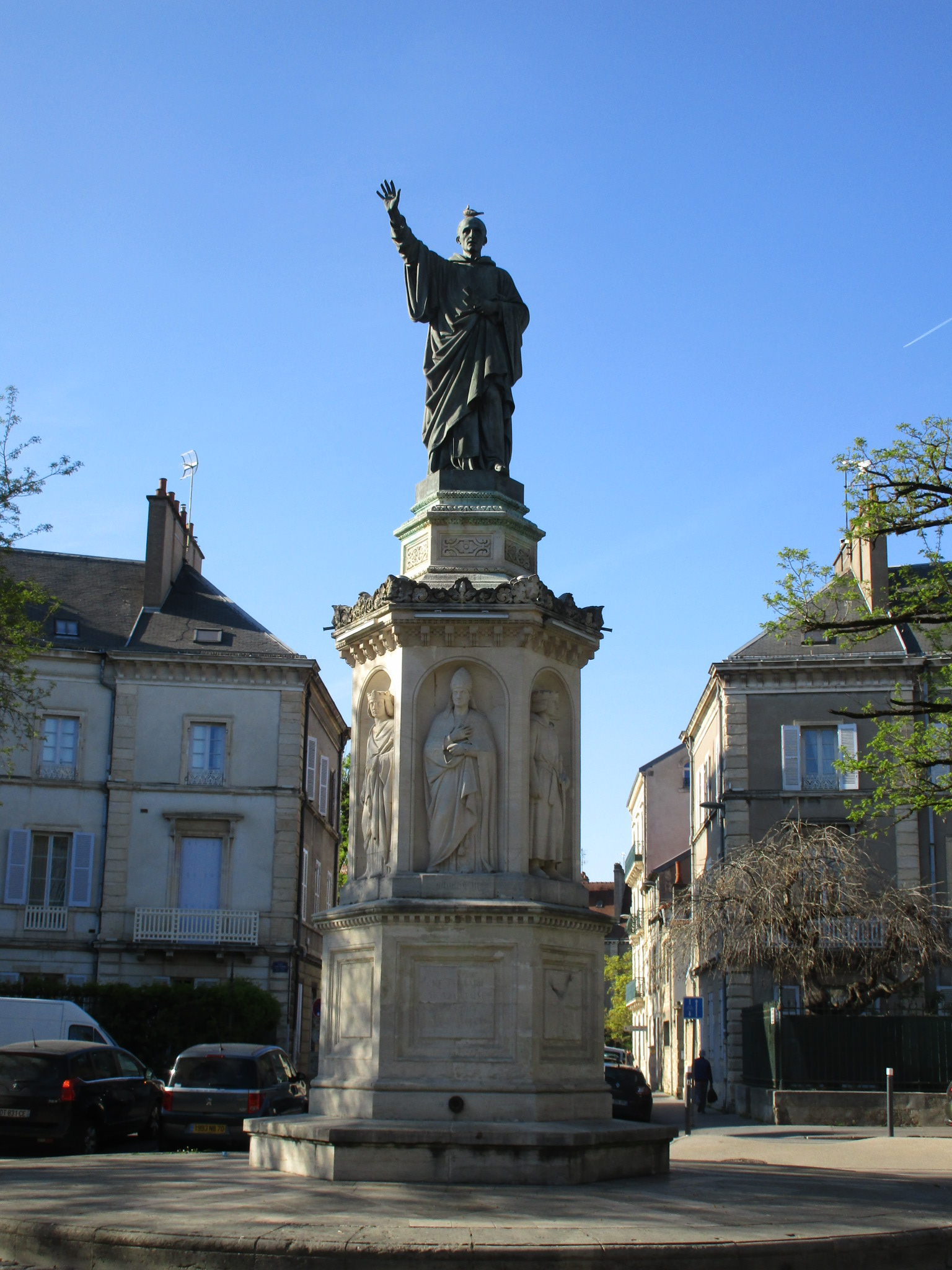
Monument to Bernard of Clairvaux at Dijon, France.

The results of the former could not but benefit the latter by placing Christian morality on a scientific basis and throwing ascetical theology itself into a scientific form. The pioneers in this field were St. Bernard (d. 1156), Hugh of St. Victor and Richard of St. Victor. St. Bernard, the greatest mystical theologian of the 12th century, also holds a prominent place among ascetical writers, so that Harnack calls the "religious genius" of the 12th century. The basic idea of his works, especially prominent in his treatise "De gratia et libero arbitrio", is that the life of the Christian should be a copy of the life of Jesus. Like Clement of Alexandria, he lays down precepts for the regulation of the necessities of life as food and dress, and for the implanting of God's love in man's heart, which would sanctify all things ("Apologia", "De præcepto et dispensatione"). Many are the steps by which love ascends till it reaches its perfection in the love for God's sake. Among his ascetical writings are: "Liber de diligendo Deo", "Tractatus de gradibus humilitatis et superbiæ", "De moribus et officio episcoporum", "Sermo de conversione ad clericos", and "De consideratione".

Frequent allusions to SS. Augustine and Gregory the Great are scattered through the pages of Hugh of St. Victor (d. 1141), so much so that he earned the distinction of being called a second Augustine by his contemporaries. He was undoubtedly the first to give to ascetical theology a more or less definite, scientific character. The ever-recurring theme of his works is love. But what he aimed at above all in his writings was to lay bare the psychological bearings of mystical and ascetical theology. Noteworthy are his works: "De vanitate mundi", "De laude caritatis", "De mode orandi", "De meditatione".

His pupil, Richard of St. Victor (d. 1173), though more ingenious and systematic, is yet less intent upon practical utility, except in his work "De exterminatione mali et promotione boni".

The theologians of the 13th century, who were no less famous for their scholastic "Summæ" than for their ascetical and mystical writings, brought ascetical teaching a broadened form and gave it the definite shape it has retained. No other epoch furnishes such proof that true science and true piety are rather a help than a hindrance to each other.

Albertus Magnus, or Albert the Great, the illustrious teacher of Thomas Aquinas, who was the first to join Aristotelian philosophy with theology and to make philosophy the handmaid of theology, was at the same time the author of excellent works on ascetics and mysticism, e. g., "De adhærendo Deo", the ripest fruit of his mystic genius, and "Paradisus animæ", which was conceived along more practical lines. St. Thomas explains in the ascetic work "De perfectione vitæ spiritualis" the essence of Christian perfection so lucidly that his line of argumentation may even in our days serve as a model. His other works too contain ample material of value both for ascetics and for mysticism.

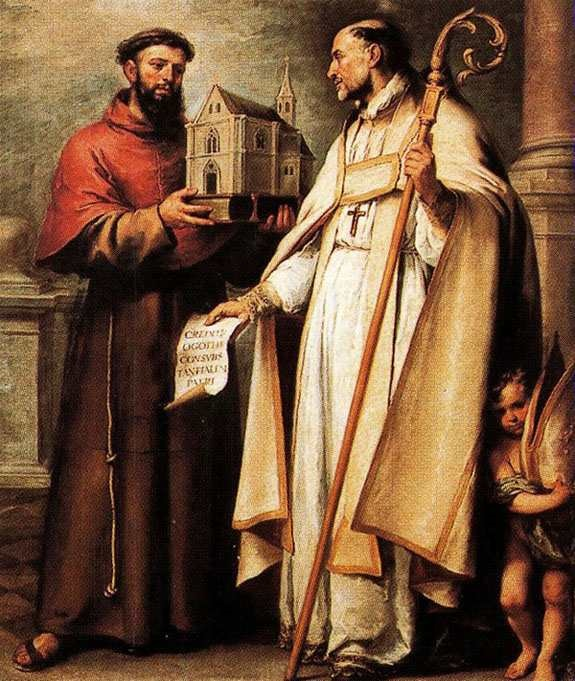
Saint Bonaventure and Saint Leander (1665–1666), by Bartolomé Esteban Murillo.

The Seraphic Doctor, St. Bonaventure, in the words of Pope Leo XIII, "treats of mystic theology in a manner so perfect that the unanimous opinion of the most expert theologians regards him as the prince of mystic theologians". Of his authentic works the following deserve mention: "De perfectione evangelica", "Collationes de septem donis Spiritus sancti", "Incendium amoris", "Soliloquium", Lignum vitæ", "De præparatione ad Missam", "Apologia pauperum". From the pen of David of Augsburg, a contemporary of these great masters, is an ascetic instruction for novices in his book entitled "De exterioris et interioris hominis compositione". He leads the reader along the three well-known ways, purgative, illuminative and unitive, purposing to make the reader a spiritual man. By severely disciplining the faculties of the soul and subordinating the flesh to the spirit, man must restore the original order, so that he may not only do what is good, but likewise do it with ease. There remains to be mentioned the "Summa de vitiis et virtutibus" of Peraldus (d. c. 1270).

The 14th century is characterized throughout by its mystical tendencies. Among the works which this period produced, Henry Suso's "Booklet of Eternal Wisdom deserves special mention on account of its highly practical value.

Pre-eminent in the fifteenth century were Gerson, Dionysius the Carthusian and the author of the Imitation of Christ. Relinquishing the ideals of the mystic writers of the fourteenth century, Gerson attached himself again to the great scholastic writers, thus avoiding the vagaries which had become alarmingly frequent among the mystics. His "Considerationes de theologia mystica" shows that he belongs to the practical school of asceticism. Dionysius the Carthusian is esteemed as a highly gifted teacher of the spiritual life. Both mysticism properly so called and practical asceticism owe valuable works to his pen. To the latter category belong: "De remediis tentationum", "De via purgativa", "De oratione", "De gaudio spirituali et pace interna", "De quatuor novissimis".

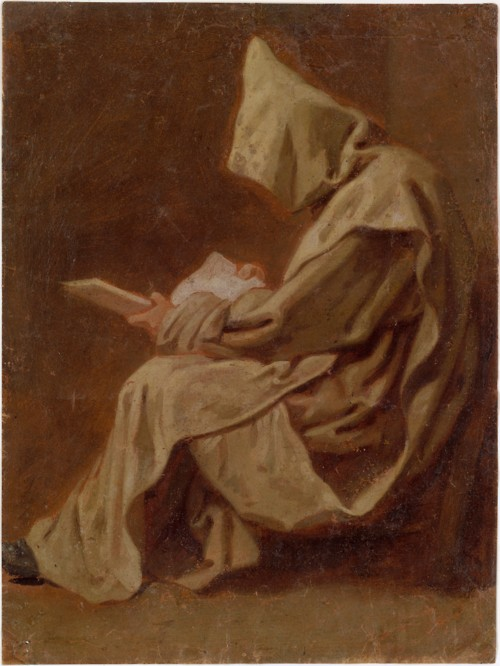
Seated Carthusian holding an open book (1711), by Jean Restout

The "Imitatio Christi", which appeared in the middle of the 15th century, deserves special attention on account of its lasting influence. "It is a classic in its ascetical unction and perfect in its artistic style" (Hamm, "Die Schönheit der kath. Moral", Munich-Gladbach, 1911, p. 74). In four books it treats of the interior spiritual life in imitation of Jesus Christ. It pictures the struggle which man must wage against his inordinate passions and perverse inclinations, the indulgence of which sullies his conscience and robs him of God's grace: "Vanity of vanities and all is vanity, except to love God and serve Him alone" (Vanitas vanitatum et omnia vanitas præter amare Deum et illi soli servire: I, i). It advises mortification and self-denial as the most efficacious weapons in this struggle. It teaches man to establish God's kingdom in his soul by the practice of virtues according to the example of Jesus Christ. It finally leads him to union with Christ by exciting love for him as well as by pointing out the frailty of all creatures: "It is necessary to leave the beloved thing for the beloved, because Jesus wishes to be loved above all things" (Oportet dilectum propter dilectum relinquere, quia Jesus vult solus super omnia amari: II, xvii). The thoughts of the "Imitation" are thrown into epigrams so simple that they are within the mental grasp of all. Though the book betrays that the author was well versed not only in Scholastic philosophy and theology, but also in the secrets of the mystical life, yet this fact never obtrudes itself on the reader, nor does it obscure the meaning of the contents. A number of quotations from the great doctors Augustine, Bernard, Bonaventure and Thomas, from Aristotle, Ovid and Seneca do not mar the impression that the whole work is the spontaneous outburst of an intensely glowing soul. It has often been said that the teachings of the "Imitation" are "unworldly" and show little appreciation for science, but one must take into consideration the peculiar circumstances of the time: Scholasticism had entered on a period of decline and had lost itself in intricate subtleties; mysticism had gone astray; all classes had been more or less infected with the spirit of licentiousness; conditions like these are the key to interpret phrases such as the following: "I would rather feel compunction than know how to define it" (Opto magis sentire compunctionem quam scire ejus definitionem) or "This is the highest wisdom: through contempt of the world to strive for the kingdom of heaven" (Ista est summa sapientia: per contemptum mundi tendere ad regna coelestia).

==== Modern times ====
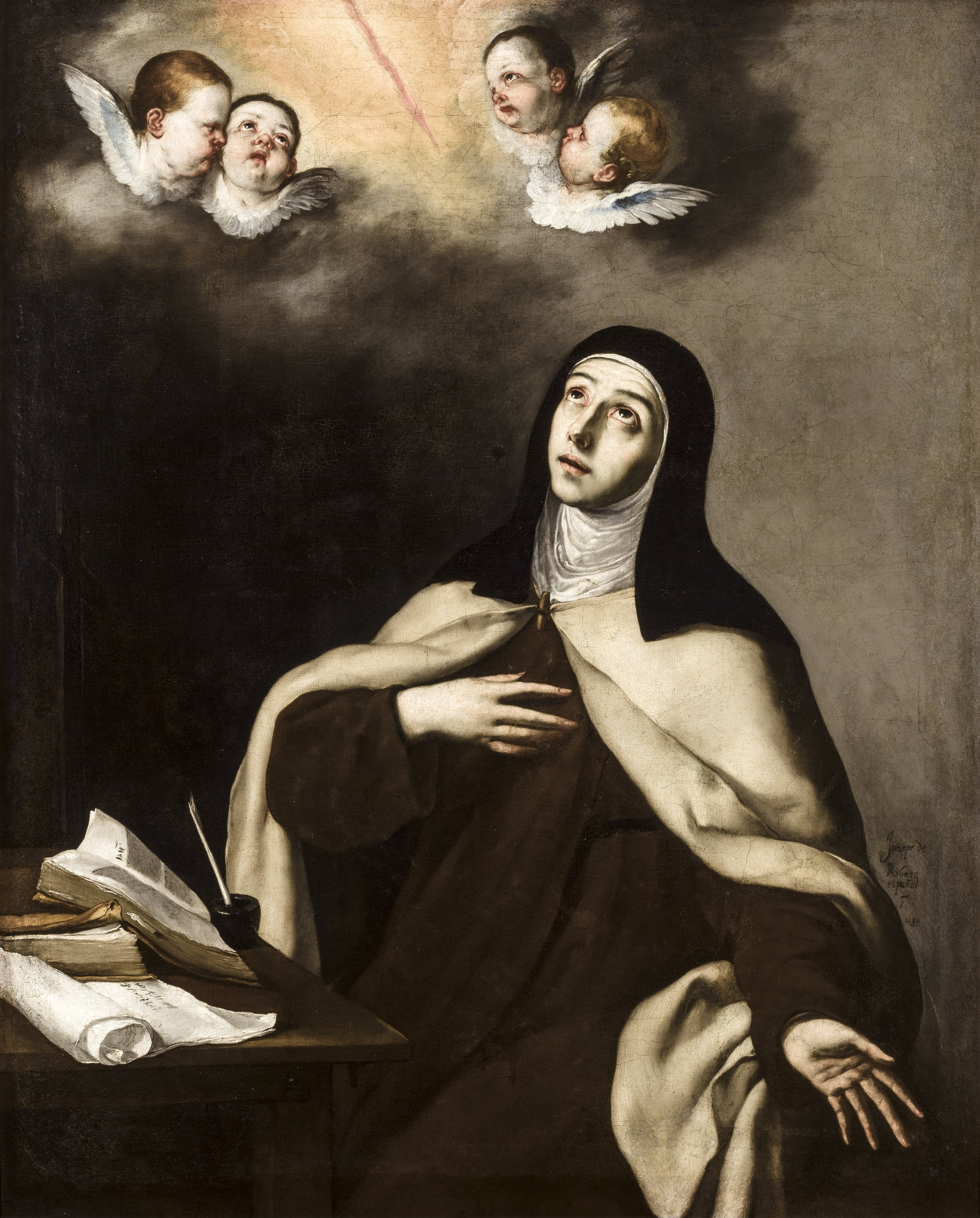
Saint Teresa of Jesus (1630), by Jusepe de Ribera.

During the 16th century St. Teresa and St. Ignatius of Loyola stand out most prominently owing to the wide-felt influence which they exerted upon the religion of their contemporaries, an influence that is still at work through their writings. The writings of St. Teresa arouse our admiration by the simplicity, clearness and precision of her judgment. Her letters show her to be an enemy of everything that smacks of eccentricity or singularity, sham piety or indiscreet zeal. One of her principal works, the "Way to Perfection", though written primarily for nuns, also contains apposite instructions for those who live in the world. While teaching the way to contemplation, she yet insists that not all are called to it and that there is greater security in the practice of humility, mortification, and the other virtues. Her masterpiece is the "Castle of the Soul", in which she expounds her theory of mysticism under the metaphor of a "castle" with many chambers. The soul resplendent with the beauty of the diamond or crystal is the castle; the various chambers are the various degrees through which the soul must pass before she can dwell in perfect union with God. Scattered throughout the work are many hints of inestimable value for asceticism as applied in everyday life. This fact is undoubtedly due to the well-founded conviction of the saint that even in extraordinary states the ordinary means must not be set aside altogether, so that illusions may be guarded against (cf. J. Zahn, "Introduction to Mysticism" p. 213).

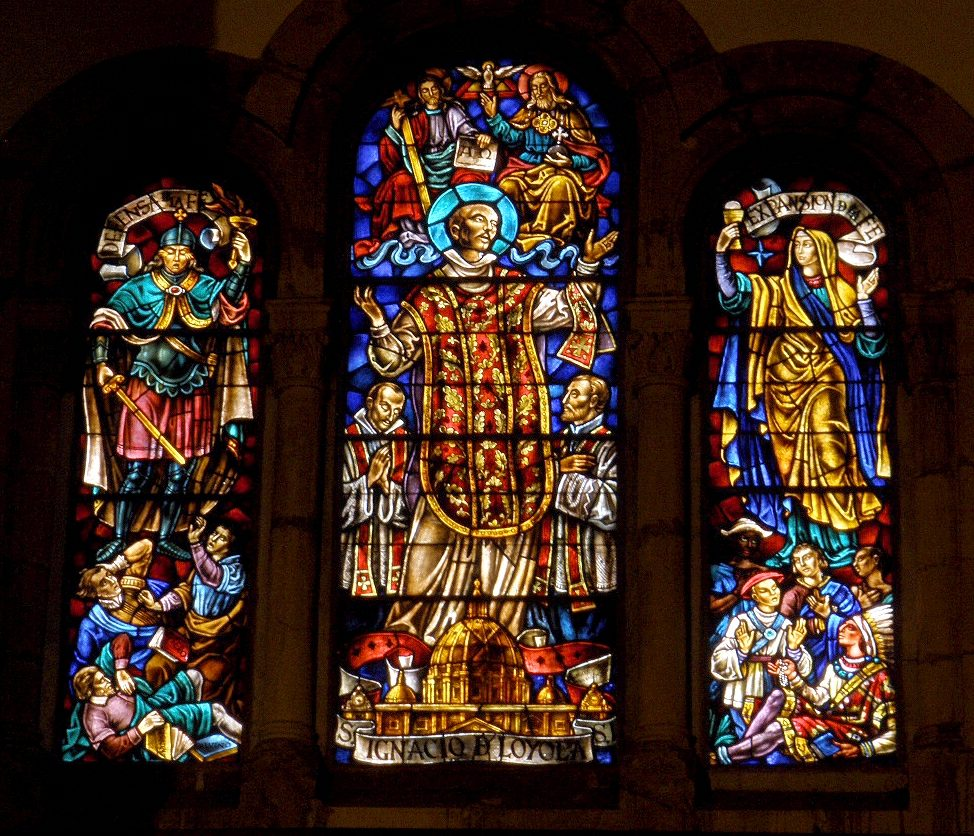
Stained glass depicting Ignatius of Loyola at Guecho, Spain.

In his "Exercitia spiritualia" St. Ignatius of Loyola has left to posterity a grand literary monument of the science of the soul, but also a method unparalleled in its practical efficacy of strengthening the willpower. The booklet has appeared in numberless editions and revisions and, "despite its modest guise, is in reality a complete system of asceticism" (Meschler). The four weeks of the Exercises acquaint the exercitant with the three degrees of the spiritual life. The first week is taken up with cleansing the soul from sin and from its inordinate attachment to creatures. The second and third weeks lead the exercitant along the illuminative way. The portrait of Christ, the most lovable of all men, is outlined before his eyes, so that he can contemplate in the humanity the reflex of Divine light and the supreme model of all virtues. The meditations of the fourth week, the subject of which are the resurrection etc., lead to union with God and teach the soul to rejoice in the glory of the Lord. It is true, there are many rules and regulations, the sequence is most logical, the arrangement of the meditations follows the laws of psychology; yet these exercises do no violence to the free will, but are meant to strengthen the faculties of the soul. They do not, as has often been asserted, make the exercitant a powerless instrument in the hands of the confessor, nor are they a mystic flight to heaven, accomplished by means of a compulsion which intends a rapid advance in perfection by a mechanical process (Zöckler, "Die Tugendlehre des Christentums", Gütersloh, 1904, p. 335). Their marked intellectualism, so frequently objected to, in no way constitutes a hindrance to mysticism (Meschler, "Jesuitenaszese u. deutsche Mystik" in "Stimmen aus Maria-Laach", 1912). On the contrary, they make man's moral will truly free by removing the hindrances, while, by cleansing the heart and by accustoming the mind to meditative prayer, they are an excellent preparation for the mystical life.

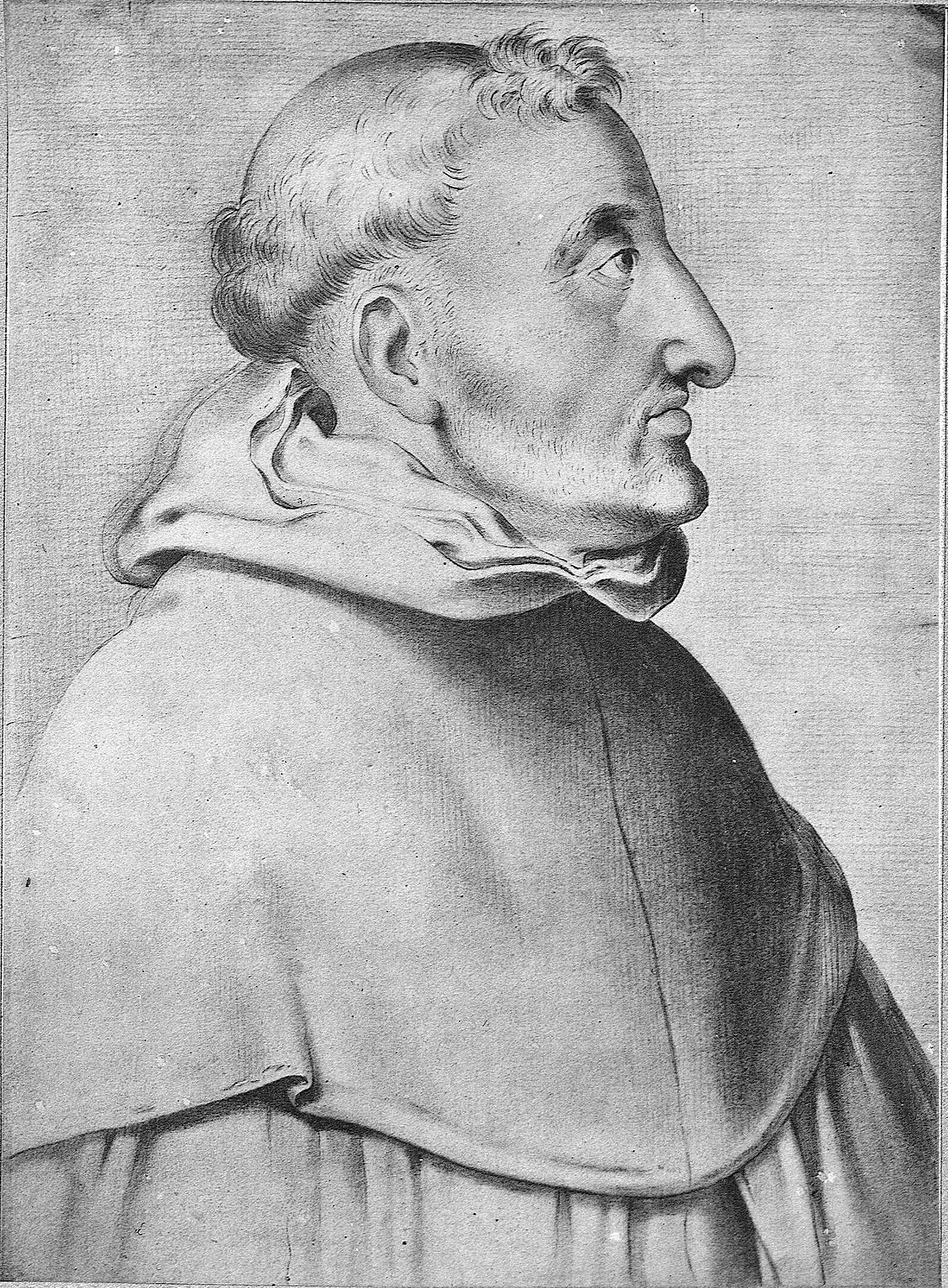
Louis of Granada (c. 1599)

Louis of Granada, O. P. (died 1588), also belongs to this period. His work "La guia de pecadores" may be styled a book full of consolation for the erring. His "El memorial de la vida cristiana" contains instructions which take the soul from the very beginning and lead her to the highest perfection. Louis of Blois (Blosius), O. S. B. (d. 1566), is of a mind kindred to St. Bernard. His "Monile spirituale" is the best known of his numerous works. Thomas of Jesus (died 1582) wrote the "Passion of Christ" and "De oratione dominica".

A great number of ascetical writers sprang up during the 17th century. Among them St. Francis de Sales stands out most prominently. According to Linsemann, the publication of his "Philothea" was an event of historical importance. To make piety attractive and to adapt it to all classes whether living in Court circles, in the world or in a monastery, this was his aim and in this he succeeded. Of a mild and sweet temperament, he never lost sight of the habits and particular circumstances of the individual. Though unwavering in his ascetical principles, he yet possessed an admirable facility for adapting them without constraint or rigidity. In the practice of mortification he recommends moderation and adaptation to one's state of life and to personal circumstances. Love of God and of man: this he puts down as the motive power of all actions. The spirit of St. Francis pervades the whole of modern asceticism, and even today his "Philothea" is one of the most widely read books on asceticism. "Theotimus", another work of his, treats in the first six chapters of the love of God, the rest being devoted to mystical prayer. His letters, too, are very instructive. Attention may be called to the new edition of his works (Euvres, Annecy, 1891 sqq.). "Il combattimento spirituale" of Scupoli (d. 1610) was spread very widely and earnestly recommended by Francis de Sales.

=== Further Catholic bibliography ===
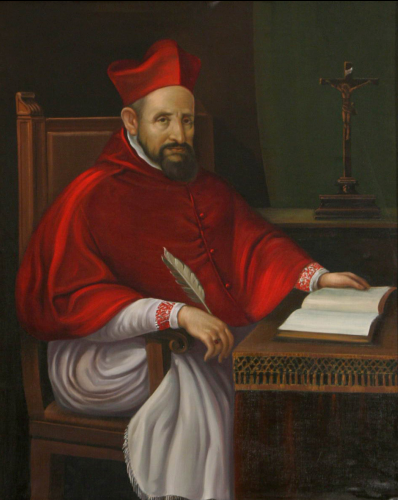
Robert Bellarmine (1542–1621), Jesuit and Doctor of the Church.

To the same period belong the following authors and works.

- Bellarmine, S. J. (d. 1621): "Gemitus columbæ"; "De ascensione mentis in Deum"; "De arte bene moriendi".
- Alphonsus Rodriguez, S. J. (d. 1616): "Exercicio de perfección y virtudes cristianas" (3 vols., Seville, 1609), which has frequently been re-edited and translated into nearly all languages.
- John of Jesus-Mary, O. C. D. (d. 1615): "Teologia Mistica" (Naples, 1607), highly esteemed by Bellarmine and Francis de Sales.
- Alvarez de Paz, S. J. (d. 1620): "De vita spirituali ejusque perfectione" (1608); "De exterminatione mali et promotione boni" (1613); "De inquisitione pacis" (1617), which was frequently re-edited.
- Antoine de Gaudier, S. J. (d. 1620): "De perfectione vitæ spiritualis" (1619; new ed., 3 vols., Turin, 1903–4).
- La Puente, S. J. (d. 1624): "Guia espiritual" (Valladolid, 1609), containing, according to his own statement, a brief epitome of the spiritual life both active and contemplative (prayer, meditation, trials, mortification, practice of virtue); "De la Perfección del Cristiano en todos sus estados" (1612). Both works have ever been highly esteemed by all ascetical men and have been translated into many languages.
- Lessius, S. J. (d. 1623): "De perfectionibus moribusque divinis", a work distinguished both for its scientific and ascetical spirit.
- Nicholas Lancicius, S. J. (d. 1638), past-master in the spiritual life, whose saintly personality is reflected in his writings (new ed., Cracow, 1889 sqq.): "De exteriore corporis compositione"; "De quatuor viis perveniendi ad perfectionem"; "De humanarum passionum dominio": "De mediis ad virtutem"; "De causis et remediis in oratione". Greatly valued is his book of meditations: "De piis erga Deum et coelites affectibus"; it has been translated into several languages.
- Schorrer, S. J.: "Synopsis theol. ascet." (Dillingen, 1662; rare edition).
- Michael Wadding (priest) as Miguel Godinez, S. J.: "Práctica de la teologia mystica" (La Puebla de los Angeles, 1681), of which we have a Latin edition together with a commentary by de la Reguera, S. J. (Rome, 1740).
- Surin, S. J. (d. 1665), wrote his important "Catéchisme spirituel" at a time when he was subject to interior trials (cf. Zahn, "Mystik", p. 441). The book appeared in many editions and translations, but was placed on the Index. The edition of Fr. Fellon, S. J. (1730), and that of Marie Dominique Bouix (Paris, 1882), probably do not fall under this prohibition, because in them the errors have been corrected. After Surin's death appeared: "Les fondements de la vie spirituelle" (Paris, 1667); "Lettres spirituelles" (ib., 1695); "Dialogues spirituels" (ib., 1704).
- Gaspar Druzbicki, S. J. (d. 1662), is the author of a considerable number of ascetical works both in Polish and in Latin, many of which were translated into other languages. There are two complete editions of his works: one published at Ingolstadt (1732) in two folios, the other at Kalisz and Posen (1681–91). Among his numerous works are: "Lapis lydius boni spiritus"; "Considerationes de soliditate veræ virtutis"; "De sublimitate perfectionis"; "De brevissima ad perfectionem via"; "Vota religiosa".
- The "Mystica theologia Divi Thomæ" of Thomas a Vallgornera, O. P. (d. 1665), published at Barcelona, (1662 and 1672) and at Turin (1890), is almost exclusively made up of quotations from St. Thomas and is a rich storehouse of ascetical material.
- From the pen of Cardinal Bona, O. Cist. (d. 1674), we have: "Principia et documents vitæ christianæ" (Rome, 1673) and "Manuductio ad coelum" (Rome, 1672 and 1678), both of which works, remarkable for their simplicity and practical utility, were frequently re-edited; the still valuable "De sacrificio Missæ"; "De discretione spirituum"; "Horologium asceticum". Complete editions of his works appeared at Antwerp, Turin, Venice.
- Morotius, O. Cist., in his "Cursus vitæ spiritualis" (Rome, 1674; new ed., Ratisbon, 1891), follows closely the lead of St. Thomas.
- The "Summa theologiæ mysticæ" (new ed., 3 vols., Freiburg, 1874) is the best and most widely read work of Philip of the Blessed Trinity (d. 1671), the philosopher among the mystic writers. He wrote in the spirit of St. Thomas, following definite scientific principles and showing their practical application in the spiritual life.
- Anthony of the Holy Ghost, O. C. D. (d. 1674), was a disciple of the author just named. His "Directorium mysticum" (new ed., Paris, 1904), dominated by the spirit of. his master, was written for the instruction of his pupils. He is also the author of the following works: "Seminarium virtutum" (3rd ed., Augsburg and Würzburg, 1750), "Irriguum virtutum" (Würzburg, 1723), "Tractatus de clericorum ac præcipue sacerdotum et pastorum dignitate", etc. (Würzburg, 1676).

In the course of the 18th century a number of valuable works on asceticism and mysticism were published. To Neumeyer, S. J. (d. 1765), we owe the "Idea theol. ascet.", a complete, scientifically arranged epitome. Rogacci, S. J. (d. 1719), wrote "Del uno necessario", an instruction in the love of God, which ranks high in ascetical literature and was translated into several languages. Giovanni Battista Scaramelli's Direttorio ascetico treats asceticism apart from mysticism. A treatise on the virtues is contained in Dirkink, S. J., "Semita perfectionis" (new ed., Paderborn, 1890). Designed along broad lines is the "Trinum perfectum" (3rd ed., Augsburg, 1728) by Michael of St. Catherine. Katzenberger, O. F. M., wrote "Scientia salutis" (new ed., Paderborn, 1901). Schram's "Institutiones theol. mysticæ" (2 vols.) combines asceticism with mysticism, though the author is at his best in the ascetical parts. St. Alphonsus Liguori (d. 1787), rightly called the "Apostolic Man", published a large number of ascetic works, full of heavenly unction and tender-hearted piety. The best-known and most important of them are: "Pratica di amar Gesù Cristo" (1768), "Visita al SS. Sacramento", perhaps the most widely read of all his ascetical works: "La vera sposa di Gesù Cristo" (1760), was meant to serve as a guide for the perfection of the soul.

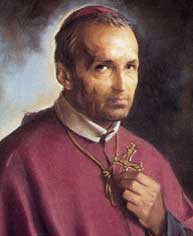
Alphonsus Liguori (1696–1787), Catholic mystic and founder of the Redemptorist Fathers.

Complete treatises on asceticism, published during the 19th and 20th centuries, are the following: Grundkötter, "Anleitung zur christl. Vollkommenheit" (Ratisbon, 1896). Leick, C. SS. R., "Schule der christl. Vollkommenheit" (Ratisbon, 1886), inspired by the writings of St. Alphonsus Liguori. Weiss, O. P., "Philosophie der christl. Vollkommenheit" (vol. V of his "Apologie"; Freiburg 1898). The author is extraordinarily well read, and his conception of the spiritual life is unusually deep. Ribet, "L'ascétique chrétienne" (Paris, 1888). Tissot, "La vie intérieure". Saudreau, "Les degrés de la vie spirituelle" (Angers, 1896 and 1897), a work full of unction. His other works, "Les faits extraordinaires de la vie spirituelle" (1908) and "La vie d'union à Dieu" (1909), belong to mysticism properly so called. Poulain, S. J., "La grâce d'oraison", though of a mystic character, yet treats of the ordinary method of prayer. Saudreau and Poulain are reliable throughout and their works are among the best productions in this branch. Rousset, O. P., "Directorium asceticum" (Freiburg, 1893). Meynard, O. P., "Traité de la vie intérieure" (Paris, 1899), based on St. Thomas. Meyer, S. J., "First Lessons in the Science of the Saints" (2nd ed., St. Louis, 1903), translated into several languages. Francis X. Mutz, "Die christliche Aszetik" (2nd ed., Paderborn, 1909). Joseph Zahn, "Einführung in die christliche Mystik" (Paderborn, 1908), important also for asceticism. Berthier, "De la perfection chrétienne et de la perfection religieuse d'après S. Thomas et S. François de Sales" (2 vols., Paris, 1901). A. Devine, "Manual of Ascetical Theology" (London). Ryan, "Groundwork of Christian Perfection" (London). Buchanan, "Perfect Love of God" (London).

An exhaustive list of Catholic ascetical writers is given in Migne.

Non-Catholic authors: Otto Zöckler, "Die Tugendlehre des Christentums, geschichtlich dargestellt" (Gütersloh, 1904). W. Hermann, "Der Verkehr des Christen mit Gott" (6th ed., Stuttgart, 1908), and "Die sittlichen Weisungen Jesu" (Göttingen, 1907). Kähler, "Verkehr mit Christo in seiner Bedeutung für das eigene Leben" (Leipzig, 1904). Peabody, "Jesus Christ and the Christian Character". A. Ritschl, "Christiiche Vollkommenheit" (Göttingen, 1902). Sheldon, "In his Steps -- What Would Jesus do?", widely read in England.

== Eastern Orthodox ==
The Eastern Orthodox share the apostolic faith and sacramental life held in the Catholic faith, and have a virtually identical understanding of the nature and purpose of the Christian life, using different terminology. Those of the Eastern Orthodox tradition refer to the practice of faith as praxis, which encompasses prayer, worship, and fasting. A form of prayer corresponding perhaps to the illuminative and unitive ways is called Hesychasm. The overall progression toward union with God is called theosis. The understanding of the Christian life, consistent with Patristic and apostolic teachings and implying a start toward purgation, is termed phronema. Orthodox sources also refer to ascetical theology, with a meaning consistent with that given above.

== Protestant ==
Many Protestants do not share the sacramental understanding that characterizes Catholic and Orthodox faith, but use the term ascetical theology in some contexts. Without the sacrament of Confession, the purgative way is more personal, and without belief that God is literally present in the Eucharist, the unitive way is also more personal and ethereal. Protestant theology of union with God tends to be personalist. As with the Eucharist, a wide variety of Protestant viewpoints exist regarding the way to follow Christ. This is partly because there is no one center of Protestant thought.

A helpful writer on the theme of askesis from a Protestant viewpoint is Eugene Peterson, especially in his work Under the Unpredictable Plant. He refers to many other Protestant writers, including Martin Thornton. Thornton's parochial theology of the remnant is an Anglican expression of the Roman Catholic rule of faith.

== Islam ==
There is not an extensive evidence trail of Islam embracing an ascetical theology, but Islamic teachings encourage adherents to imitate closely Muhammad in order to achieve spiritual perfection. Moreover, a certain kind of asceticism, known in Islamic terminology as zuhd, exists in manuals of Islamic ethics and mysticism.

== See also ==
- Asceticism
- Christian monasticism
- Eastern Christian monasticism
- The Ascetical Homilies of Isaac the Syrian
