= Jacob Merlo Horstius =

German theologian

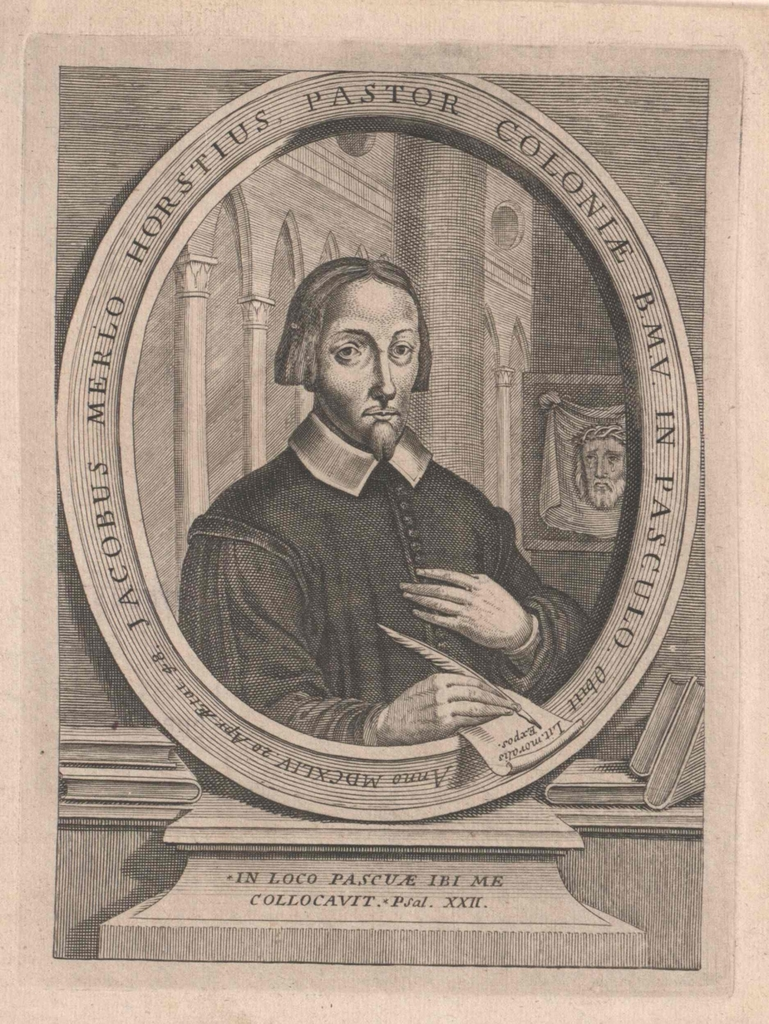
- Jacob Merlo Horstius
- Born: 24 July 1597; Horst, Limburg
- Died: 21 April 1644 (aged 46); Cologne, Germany
- Occupation: Theologian

Jacob Merlo Horstius (24 July 1597 – 21 April 1644) was a Dutch Roman Catholic theologian of the 17th century.

== Life ==
He was born in Horst, Limburg on 24 July 1597.

At a young age, he moved from Horst to Cologne and started his career in theology as a preacher.

He died in Cologne, Germany on 21 April 1644.

== Education ==
He attended the Jesuit high school in Cologne.

He received his Licentiate of Theology from the University of Cologne in 1626.

== Career ==
He served as a priest at the Lyskirchen in Cologne.

In 1623, he was appointed as a pastor of St. Mary's in Pesch.

== Bibliography ==
He is the author of a number of notable books:

- Life and works of Saint Bernard, Abbot of Clairvaux
- The paradise of the soul; containing a great variety of moving instructions and prayers - https://en.wikisource.org/wiki/The_paradise_of_the_Christian_soul
- The paradise of the soul of a true Christian: containing the necessary duties of a Christian life
- Sancti Bernardi abbatis primi Clarae-Vallensis volumen
- Absolutissima in omnes Beati Pauli et septem Catholicas apostolorum epistolas commentaria tribus tomis distincta

== See also ==
- Prayer in the Catholic Church
- De moribus et officio episcoporum
