= Antoine de Gaudier =

French Jesuit writer

Antoine de Gaudier (7 January 1572 – 14 April 1622) was a French Jesuit writer on ascetic theology.

== Life ==
Gaudier was born at Château-Thierry. About the age of twenty he entered the Society of Jesus at Tournay. Later on he was rector at Liège, professor of Holy Scripture at Pont-à-Mousson, and of moral theology at La Flèche. In these two last-named posts he was also charged with the spiritual direction of his brethren, and showed such an aptitude for this branch of the ministry that he was named master of novices and tertians. He died in Paris.

== Works ==
In the discharge of his various functions, he found an opportunity of developing before a domestic audience the principal matter of asceticism, which he elaborated little by little into a complete treatise. The eagerness shown to possess his spiritual writings led him at last to publish them. There then appeared successively in Latin:

- De Sanctissimo Christi Jesu amore opusculum (Pont-à-Mousson, 1619), translated into English by G. Tickell, S.J. (The Love of Our Lord Jesus Christ, Derby, 1864)
- De verâ Christi Jesu imitatione
- De Dei praesentiâ
- Praxis meditandi a B.P. Ignatio traditae explicatio (Paris, 1620)

There are French translations of these four works. After the death of Father Gaudier all his spiritual works, both printed and unedited, were collected in one folio volume under the title De naturâ et statibus perfectionis (Paris, 1643), a better edition in three octavo volumes being later supplied by Father J. Martinow, S.J. (Paris, 1856–8). It contains a thirty days' retreat according to the Spiritual Exercises of St. Ignatius, which has been separately edited several times since 1643.
