= Thomas de Vallgornera =

Thomas de Vallgornera (born in Catalonia about 1595; died 15 September 1665) was a Spanish Dominican theologian and ascetical writer.

== Life ==
He was a member of the convent of Barcelona, and for some time, while Catalonia was subject to the French, was its vicar-general, about 1642.

== Works ==
His principal work is a mystical theology first published at Barcelona in 1662 under the title Mystica theologia D. Thomae, utriusque theologiae scolasticae et mysticae principis, etc.

Three years later, 1665, a new and augmented edition appeared. The second edition exceeded the first by eighty-five pages. The work having become rare and difficult to obtain, a new edition was brought out by the Dominican Jean Berthier at Turin, 1890. It contains the text of the original edition of 1662 in the body of the work, and the editions which appeared in the edition of 1665 in the form of added notes are given in an appendix.

The doctrine of the book is the doctrine of Thomas Aquinas, of which the author writes in his prologue:

"The mystical doctrine of St. Thomas is of such great authority, precisely because it is founded on Scholastic doctrine, that it can scarcely be expressed in words. That mystic doctrine which is not repugnant to the principles of scholastic doctrine has a firm foundation, and therefore readers who study mystical theology in St. Thomas find it firm and well-established; on the contrary, those who read it in other books which treat of mystical matters alone, without any teacher or guide, under the appearance of devotion in somewhat severe words, absorb material for errors."

Besides his Mystical Theology Vallgornera is the author of a book on the Rosary of the Blessed Virgin, De Rosario B. Marix Virginis, which appeared at Barcelona about 1662. It consists of pious meditations.
