= De moribus et officio episcoporum =

Treatise by Bernard of Clairvaux

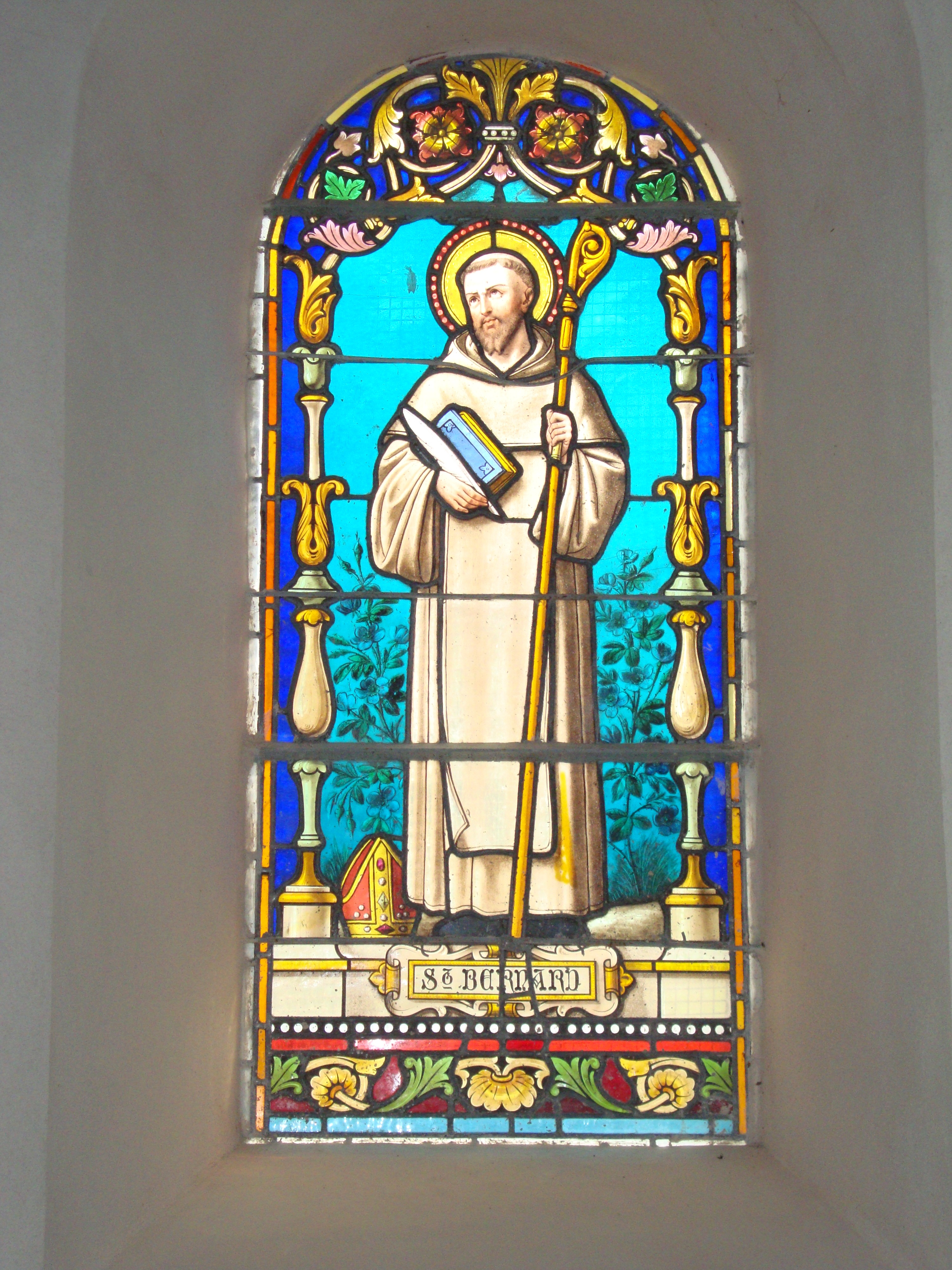
Stained glass window displaying Saint Bernard of Clairvaux at Camou-Cihigue, France.

De moribus et officio episcoporum (lit. 'On the morals and duties of bishops'), also known as the Letter 42, is a 12th-century epistle by French Catholic abbot Bernard of Clairvaux, addressed to the Archbishop of Sens Henri Sanglier. Jean Mabillon and Jacob Merlo Horstius compile it as a treatise. It is Bernard's only extensive work concerning secular clergy.

== Context ==
The letter was probably written between 1127 and 1128, and is dedicated to archbishop Henri de Boisrogues, who served at the archdiocese of Sens from 1122 to 1142. Henri had spent most of his young years at the royal court of Louis VI and had become a bishop with the approval of the king.

After his appointment, Henri continued visiting the court and living a fastuous life. He was ordained around the time of the Concordat of Worms. In the context of clerical discipline related to the Gregorian reform, aimed at rooting out concubinage and simony, Henri embraced the reform's postulates under the influence of bishops Geoffroy de Lèves and of Burchard of Meaux. At the beginning of his letter, Bernard mentions Henri's previous mundane lifestyle and praises his recent conversion.

The work is greatly influenced by the recent monastic reform and has been compared to Ambrose of Milan's Liber de Officiis. The existence of the treatise is evidence of the great prestige held by the young abbot, who was revered for moral advice even by his ecclesiastical superiors. Henri would be an important patron of the Cistercians in his diocese.

== Doctrine ==
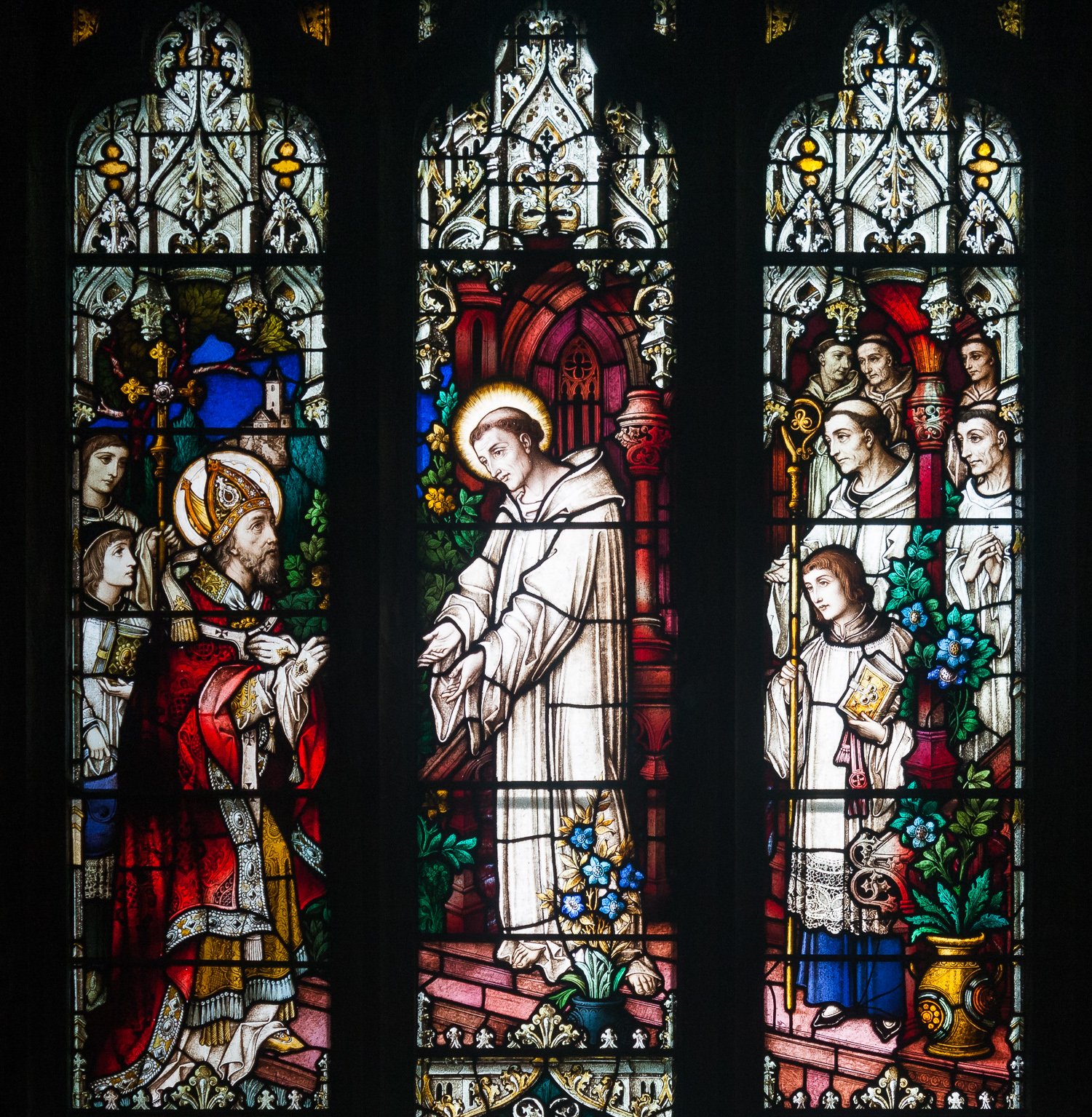
Bernard welcoming bishop Saint Malachy to Clairvaux, stained glass at the Cathedral of Armagh.

In the prologue, Bernard starts by presenting himself as unworthy to advise a bishop, but remarks his duty of obeying the prelate's command to write the letter. Both clerics are connected by a relationship of community as churchmen (familiaritas), but are also separated by the principle of authority (auctoritas). This leads to a conflict between Bernard's earlier work in favor of the independence of monastic orders from their dioceses, and his appeal to Henri to assert his authority over monastic houses.

The epistle elaborates on typical Bernardine topics, such as self-knowledge or the love of self. Bernard describes prudence and love as essential virtues of a prelate, particularly regarding those he governs. The author asks Henri to undertake his pastoral work as a matter of love and not of conceit or worldly prestige. Bernard calls the archbishop to simplicity as an antidote to greed and other vices. The monk stresses Henri's responsibilities after receiving the "keys of the Kingdom of Heaven", and warns him of the temptations common to his office.

Bernard's characterization of the ideal qualities of a bishop is markedly Cistercian, and presents humility as the most important of them all. A possible influence of Gregory I's Book of Pastoral Care has been pointed out regarding this aspect. The monk is highly critical of "clerical vanities", and attacks those secular clerics who, due to arrogance, ambition or lack of self-awareness, pursued religious life as a career.

If honours are enticing to those who aspire to them, burdens fill anyone pondering them with fear and dread...Many would not run after honours with such confidence and alacrity if they realized that they were burdens too. Frightened of being weighed down, they would certainly not make such efforts and take such risks for the trappings of the office...Schoolboys and beardless youths are elevated to ecclesiastical dignities on account of their noble birth, one day subject to the switch, the next lording it over priests.

Bernard also condemned the use of "frivolous clothing" by clerics. Critical of the display of "feminine trappings", the author states that bishops should "blush in shame at wrapping furs around necks that ought instead to bear the yoke of Christ". The writer goes further and asks the clerics of his order to return to the primitive humility, criticizing the use of miters and rings from an ascetical point of view and asking for a return to the ancient observance of the Rule of Saint Benedict, an issue which had prompted the foundation of the Cistercians.

== See also ==
- Cluniac Reforms
- De Officiis, by Cicero.

== Bibliography ==
- Boquet, Damien (2007), "Le gouvernement de soi et des autres selon Bernard de Clairvaux", Le pouvoir au Moyen Âge (in French), Presses universitaires de Provence, pp. 279–296, doi:10.4000/books.pup.5861, ISBN 978-2-85399-601-3
- de Elía, Manuel J. (2008). La Simplicitas como semejanza divina en el hombre, según San Bernardo de Claraval (Doctor of Theology thesis) (in Spanish). Pontifical University of the Holy Cross.
- Horstius, Jacob Merlo; Mabillon, Jean (1715). Les Lettres de S. Bernard. Vol. 1. Paris: Jean de Nully.
- Leclercq, Jean; Rochais, Henri; Duchet-Suchaux, Monique; Debré, Olivier (2001). Lettres. Œuvres complètes / Bernard de Clairvaux (in French). Vol. 2. Paris: les Éd. du Cerf. ISBN 978-2-204-06674-7.
- Ott, John S. (2015). Bishops, authority, and community in northwestern Europe, c.1050-1150. Cambridge studies in medieval life and thought. Cambridge: Cambridge University Press. ISBN 978-1-107-01781-8.
- Salmon, Pierre (2006). Los ornamentos pontificales (in Spanish). Barcelona: Centre de Pastoral Litúrgica. ISBN 978-84-9805-111-7.
