= Yada Yoshikiyo =

Japanese samurai military commander, feudal lord, and courtier

Minamoto no Yoshikiyo (源 義清, 1154 – 17 November 1183) was a Japanese samurai military commander, feudal lord, and courtier in the late Heian period of Japan's history. He took part in the Genpei War as a general for Minamoto no Yoshinaka, leading Yoshinaka's army against the Taira clan at the Battle of Mizushima where he was defeated and perished. His descendants would go on to form the Hosokawa clan and gain influence and power during the Ashikaga Shogunate and the subsequent Sengoku and Edo Periods as Daimyo.

== Genealogy ==
Although Yoshikiyo was the eldest son of Minamoto no Yoshiyasu, the founder of the Ashikaga clan, he did not inherit his father's estates in Shimotsuke Province following Yoshiyasu's death. Those properties instead went to his younger half-brother Ashikaga Yoshikane whose mother was Yoshiyasu's primary wife. Yoshikiyo's mother's name is unknown, but she served as a lady-in-waiting to the emperor's wife.

It was instead his uncle Nitta Yoshishige who acted as his beneficiary, marrying one of his daughters to Yoshikiyo and granting him the town of Yada from Yoshishige's own holdings in Kozuke Province. It is from that town that Yoshikiyo took the name by which he is known by in the Heike Monogatari: Yada no Hangandai (矢田判官代, "Assistant Inspector of Yada").

== Life ==
Like his brother Yoshikane, when he came of age Yoshikiyo went to Kyoto and entered the service of an Imperial Princess as a Chamberlain (蔵人) finding service under the former Saiin of Kamo Shrine and Honorary Consort of Emperor Nijo, Muneko, who by this point had retired and become a Buddhist nun.

In 1180 when Prince Mochihito sent out a request for aid from the Minamoto clan to back his bid for the Chrysanthemum Throne in response to the enthronement of Taira no Kiyomori's 2-year-old grandson Emperor Antoku. Yoshikiyo joined his clan in rebellion, first serving under the veteran statesman Minamoto no Yorimasa. Following Yorimasa's defeat and suicide at the Battle of Uji, Yoshikiyo and his forces next linked up with Minamoto no Yoshinaka where he would find greater success, leading one of the columns of Yoshinaka's army into the capital from Mount Ōe in 1183.

The Taira abandoned the capital and set up a new court in Yashima in Sanuki Province. In November 1183, Yoshinaka sent Yoshikiyo and Unno Yukihiro to lead an army with orders to destroy the Taira remnants who were causing trouble in the Seto Inland Sea. Yoshikiyo set out for Mizushima in Bitchu Province and prepared to cross the sea to take Yashima, however when he arrived he was ambushed by the Taira navy under the command of Taira no Tomomori.

Yoshikiyo's forces were handed a crushing defeat at the hands of the Taira Navy who had greater experience at nautical combat. The Taira ships had been linked together to create a larger platform upon which to concentrate their forces. Yukihiro and Yoshikiyo's younger brother Yada Yoshinaga lost their lives in the storm of arrows and melee that followed. In desperation, Yoshikiyo attempted to launch an assault on the Taira flagship with six of his retainers, but the small craft they were in capsized and Yoshikiyo drowned.

== See also ==
- Ashikaga clan
- Genpei War
- Kawachi Genji
- Minamoto no Yoshinaka
- Seiwa Genji

== Works cited ==
- 田中大喜 (Hiroki Tanaka) (16 December 2021). 足利氏と新田氏. 対決の東国史 (Conflicts in the History of Eastern Japan) (in Japanese). Vol. 3. Yoshikawa Kōbunkan. ISBN 978-4-642-06869-7.
- 上田正昭; 津田秀夫; 永原慶二; 藤井松一; 藤原彰, eds. (10 January 2009). コンサイス日本人名辞典 [Concise Japanese Biographical Dictionary] (in Japanese) (5th ed.). Sanseidō. ISBN 978-4-385-15801-3.
