= Battle of Shinohara =

Battle in 1183 in Japan

- Part of the Genpei War
Date	Summer 1183
Location	Shinohara, Kaga Province 36°21′21″N 136°21′37″E
Result	Minamoto victory

Belligerents
Minamoto clan	Taira clan

Commanders and leaders
Minamoto no Yoshinaka	Taira no Munemori
- Location within Japan

The Battle of Shinohara occurred in 1183 during the Genpei War in Japan, in what is now Kaga city, Ishikawa prefecture.

== History ==
Following the Battle of Kurikara, Minamoto no Yoshinaka caught up with the retreating Taira no Munemori. An archery duel by champions on both sides preceded general fighting, which included several celebrated instances of single combat. Victory went to the Minamoto. However, Yoshinaka's old retainer, Saito Sanemori, was a casualty.

== See also ==
- Sanemori (Noh play)
