= Battle of Mizushima =

1183 naval battle of the Genpei War

Coordinates: 34°35′N 133°46′E

- Part of the Genpei War
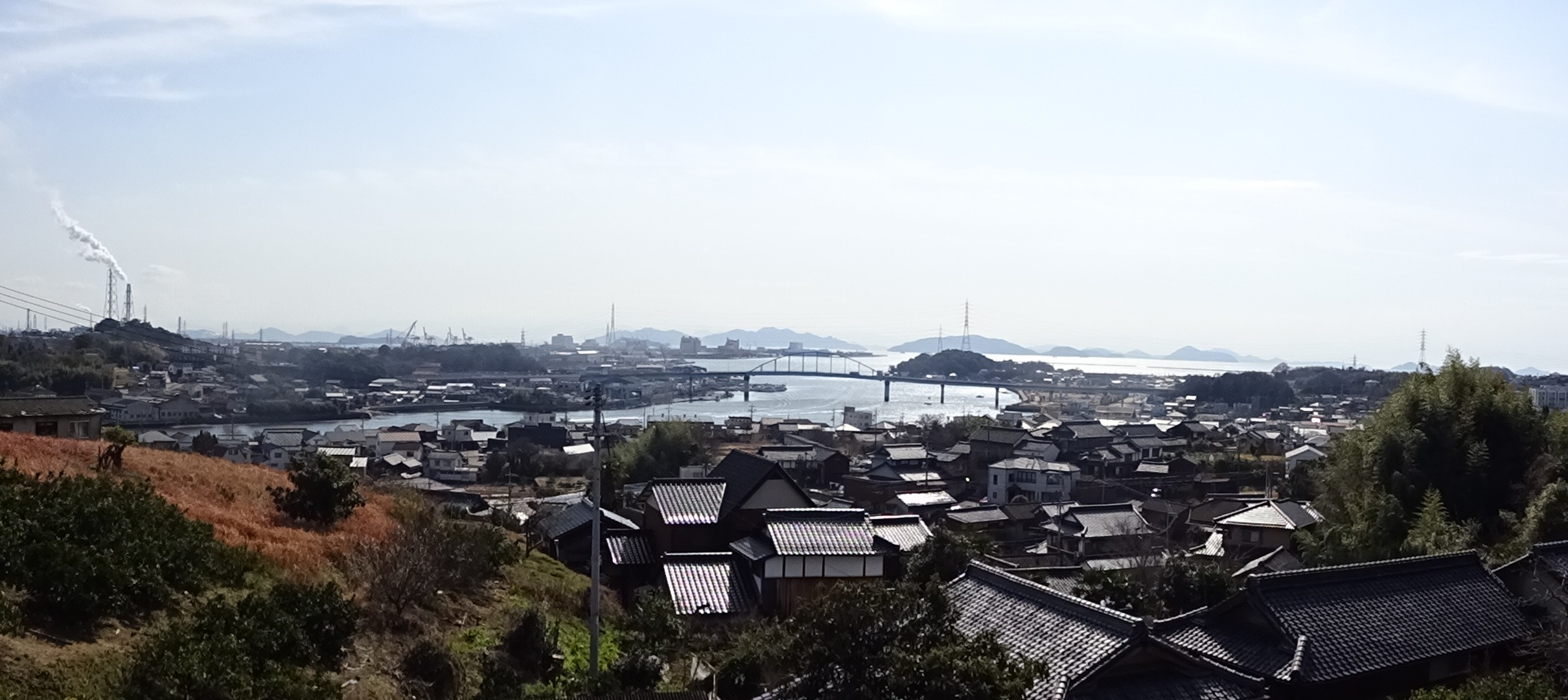
Date	November 17, 1183
Location	Mizushima, Bitchu Province
Result	Taira victory

Belligerents
Minamoto clan	Taira clan

Commanders and leaders
Yada Yoshikiyo	Taira no Shigehira; Taira no Tomomori; Taira no Noritsune

The naval battle of Mizushima took place on 17 November 1183 during the Genpei War. One of the most important bases of the Taira was Yashima, a small island off the coast of Shikoku. In November 1183, Minamoto no Yoshinaka sent an army to cross the Inland Sea to Yashima, but they were caught by the Taira just offshore of Mizushima (水島), a small island of Bitchu Province, just off Honshū. The Taira tied their ships together and placed planks across them to form a flat fighting surface.

The battle began with Taira archers loosing a rain of arrows upon the Minamoto boats; when the boats were close enough, daggers and swords were drawn, and the two sides engaged in hand-to-hand combat. Finally, the Taira, who had brought fully equipped horses on their ships, swam to the shore with their steeds, and routed the remaining Minamoto warriors.
