= Battle of Muroyama =

Battle in 1183 in Japan

- Part of the Genpei War
Date	1183
Location	Muroyama, Harima Province
Result	Taira victory

Belligerents
Minamoto clan	Taira clan

Commanders and leaders
Minamoto no Yukiie	Taira no Tomomori

The battle of Muroyama was one of many battles of the 12th-century Japanese civil war known as the Genpei War. The Taira forces split into five divisions, each attacking in succession, and wearing down Yukiie's men. Eventually surrounded, the Minamoto were forced to flee.
