= Battle of Yahagi-gawa =

Battle in 1181 in Japan

- Part of the Genpei War
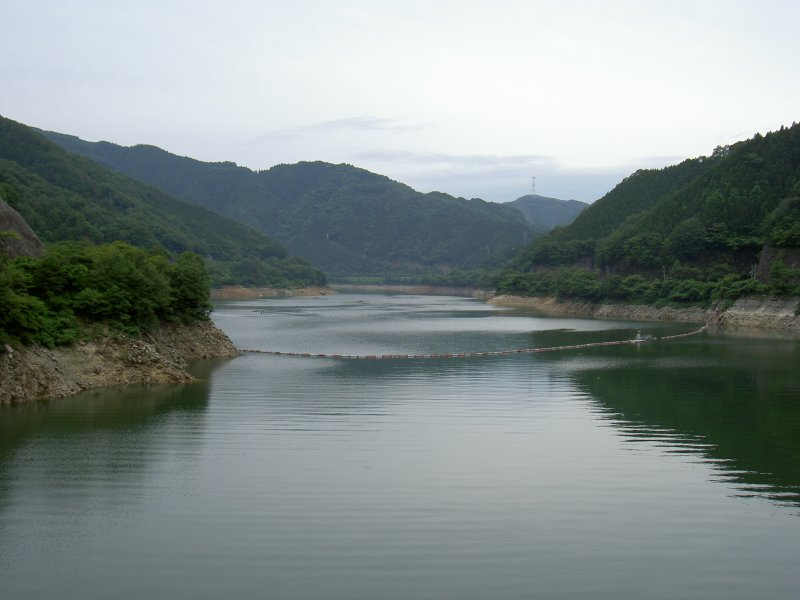
- The Yahagi River
Date	Spring 1181
Location	Yahagi-gawa, Owari Province
Result	Taira victory

Belligerents
Minamoto clan	Taira clan

Commanders and leaders
Minamoto no Yukiie	Taira no Tomomori

The Battle of Yahagi-gawa (矢作川の戦い, Yahagi-gawa no Tatakai) took place in 1181. Retreating from the Battle of Sunomata-gawa, Minamoto no Yukiie attempted to make a stand by destroying the bridge over the Yahagi River (矢作川 Yahagi-gawa) and putting up a defensive shieldwall. He was forced to withdraw in the end, but the Taira pursuit was soon called off when their leader, Tomomori, fell ill.
