= Sunomata =

Sunomata can may refer to various places and events in Japan:

- The former town of Sunomata, Gifu, now part of the city of Ōgaki, Gifu Prefecture
- The Nagara River, formerly called the Sunomata River, in Gifu, Aichi, and Mie Prefectures
- Sunomata Castle in Ōgaki, Gifu Prefecture
- The Battle of Sunomata-gawa
