= Taira no Tomomori =

Son of Taira no Kiyomori (1152–1185)

Chunagon Taira no Tomomori Junii
- 平 知盛
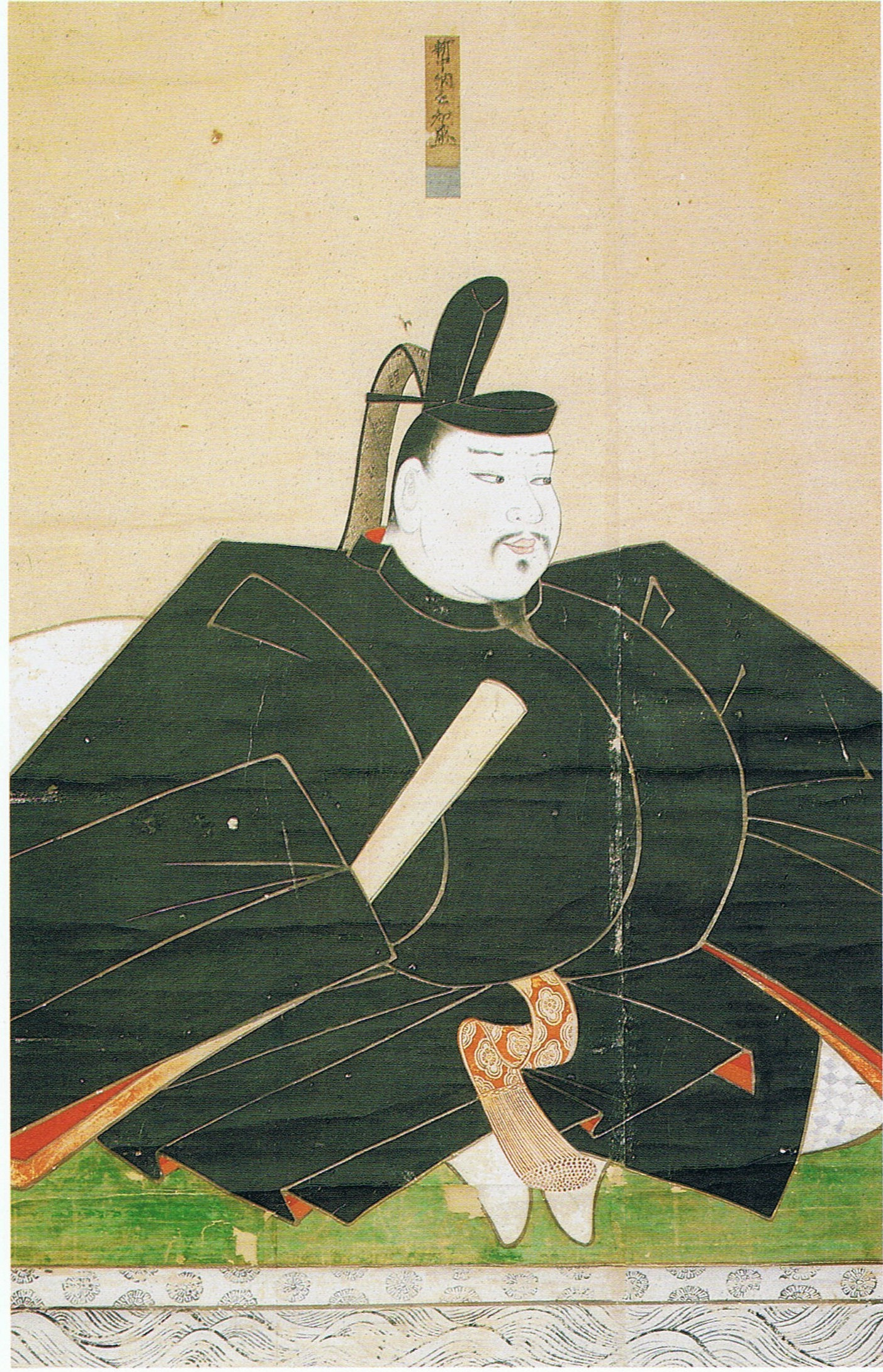
- Born: 1152
- Died: 1185 (aged 32–33)
- Children: Taira no Tomoaki
- Relatives: Taira Kiyomori (father) Taira no Tokiko (Mother) Taira no Tokuko (sister) Taira Munemori (brother) Taira Shigemori (brother) Taira no Shigehira (brother) Antoku (Nephew)
- Military career
- Allegiance: Taira clan
- Engagements: Battle of Uji (1180) Siege of Nara Battle of Sunomata-gawa Battle of Yahagi-gawa Battle of Mizushima Battle of Muroyama Battle of Dan no Ura

Taira no Tomomori (平 知盛) (1152–1185) was the son of Taira no Kiyomori, and one of the Taira clan's chief commanders in the Genpei War at the end of the Heian period of Japanese history.

He was victorious at the Battle of Uji in 1180. He also became successful in the Battle of Yahagigawa in 1181.

Tomomori was again victorious in the naval Battle of Mizushima two years later.

At the Battle of Dan-no-ura, when the Taira were decisively beaten by their rivals, Tomomori joined many of his fellow clan members in committing suicide. He tied an anchor to his feet and leapt into the sea.

Tomomori has become a popular subject for kabuki plays.

== Gallery ==
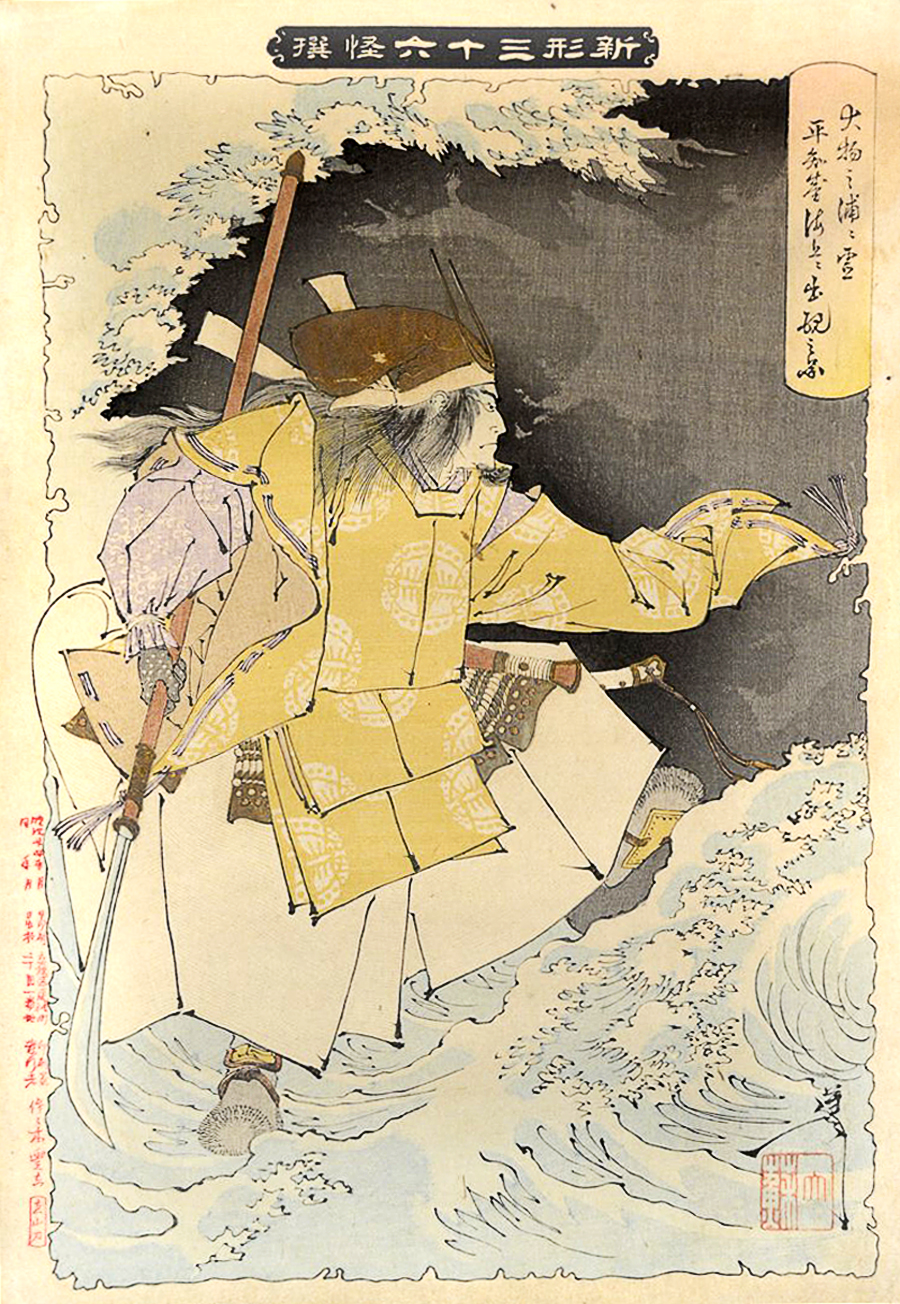
The ghost of Taira no Tomomori at Daimotsu Bay, in an 1891 print by Tsukioka Yoshitoshi.

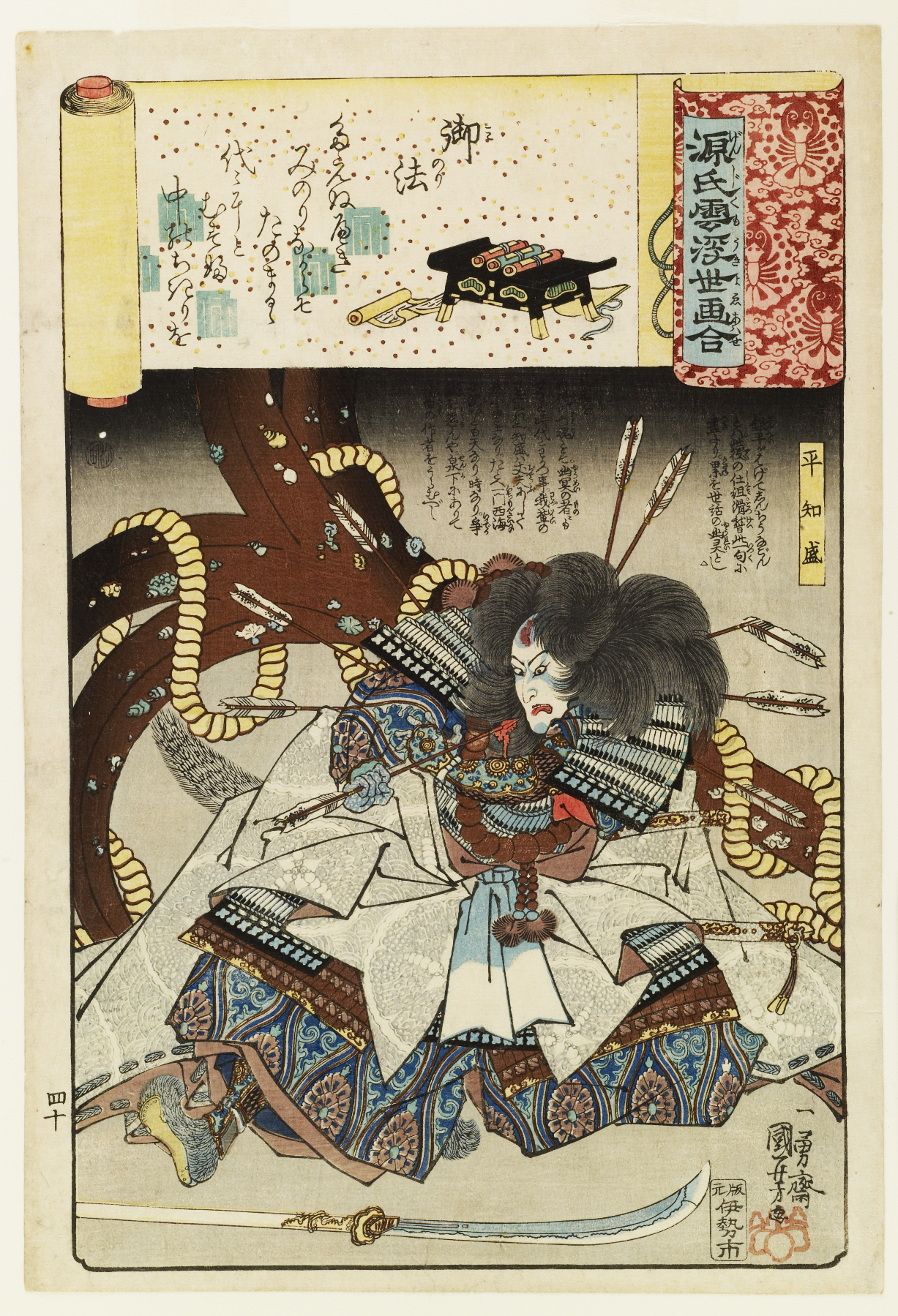
The great 12th-century general Taira no Tomomori ties himself to an anchor so that he may die by his own hand and not from enemy action as defeat nears in the famous sea battle at Dan-no-ura (1185)

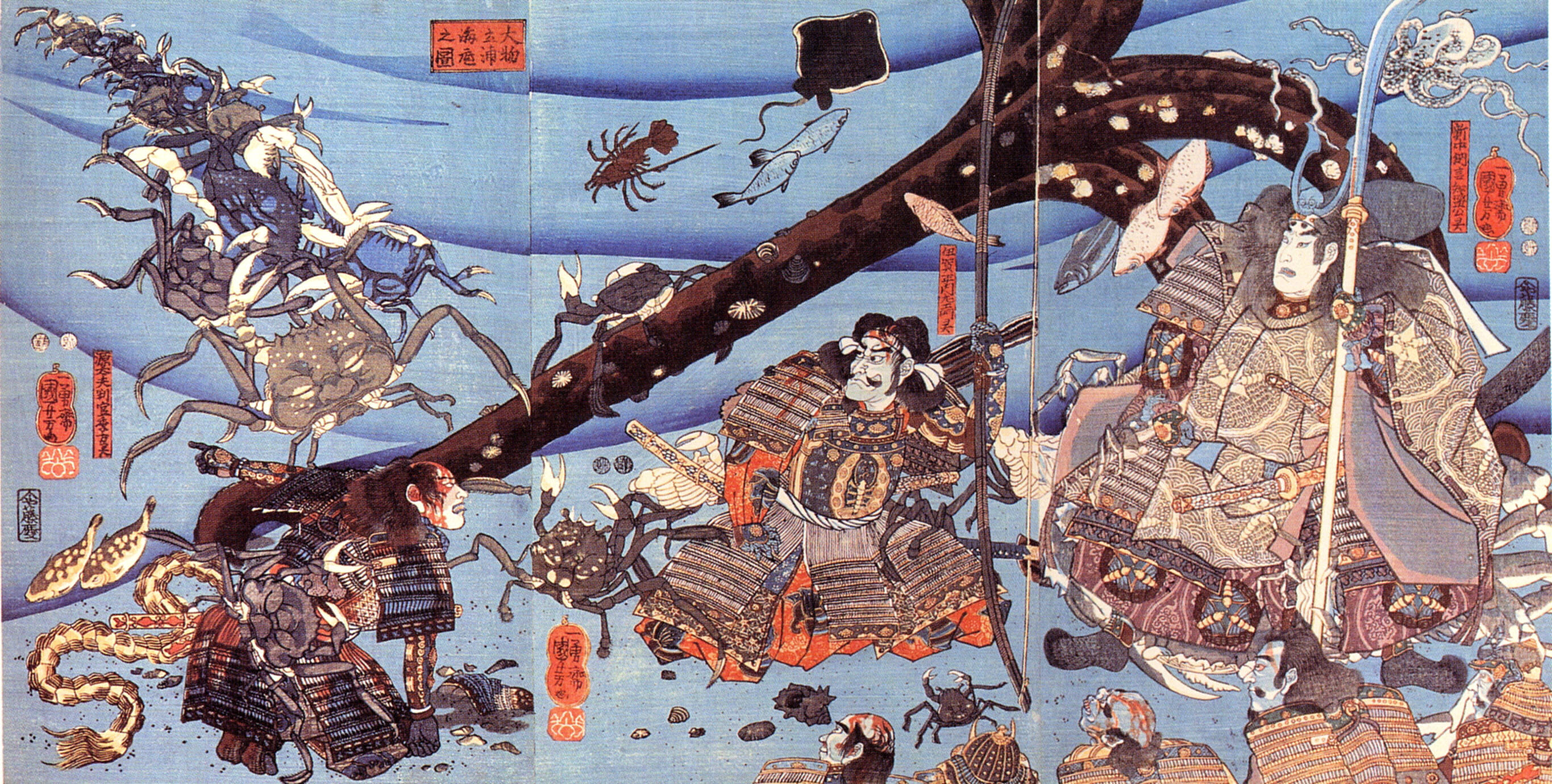
The ghost of Taira no Tomomori along with the anchor he drowned with, and heikegani with faces of fallen soldiers
