= Taira no Kagekiyo =

Samurai

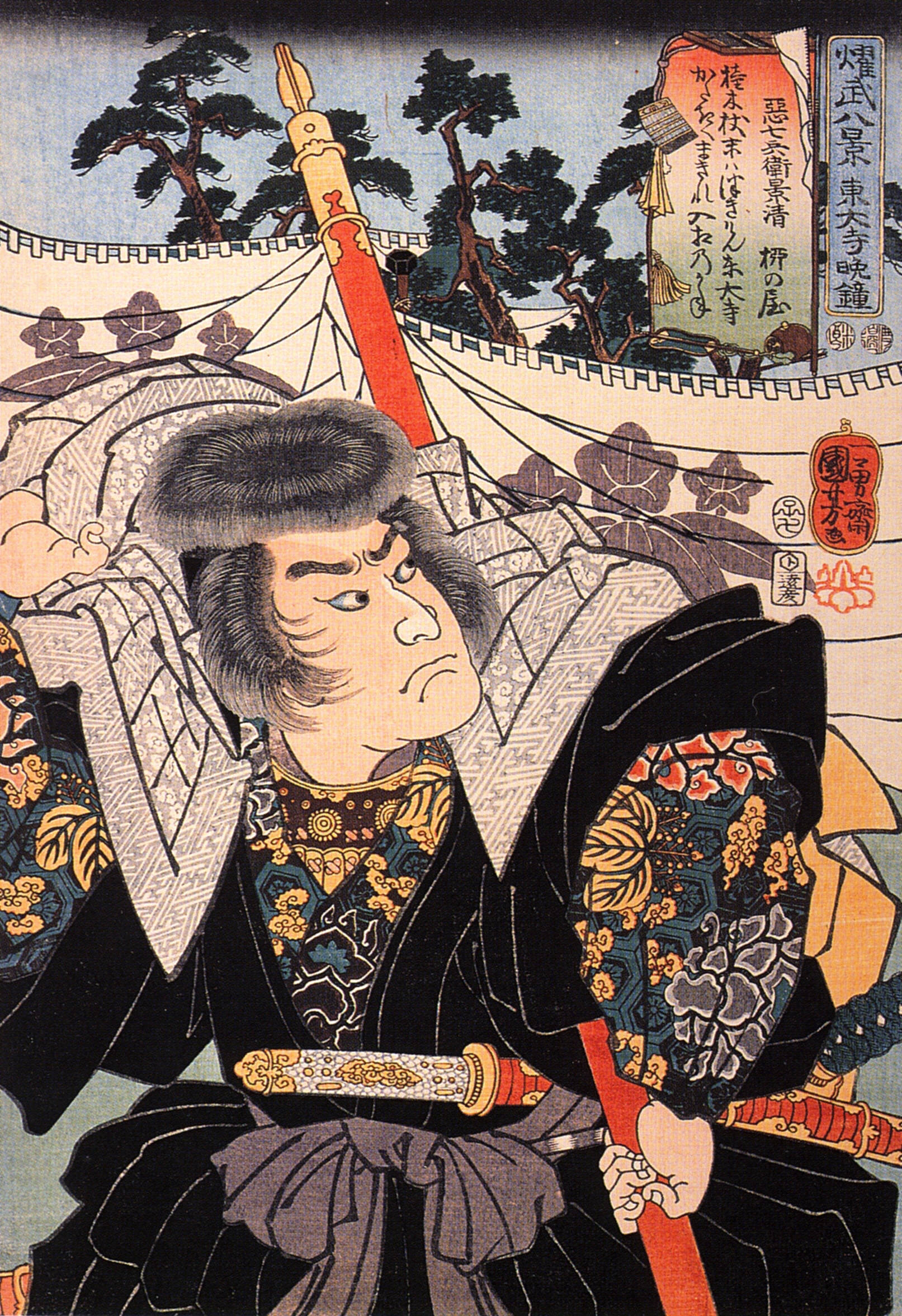
Taira no Kagekiyo, woodblock print by Utagawa Kuniyoshi.

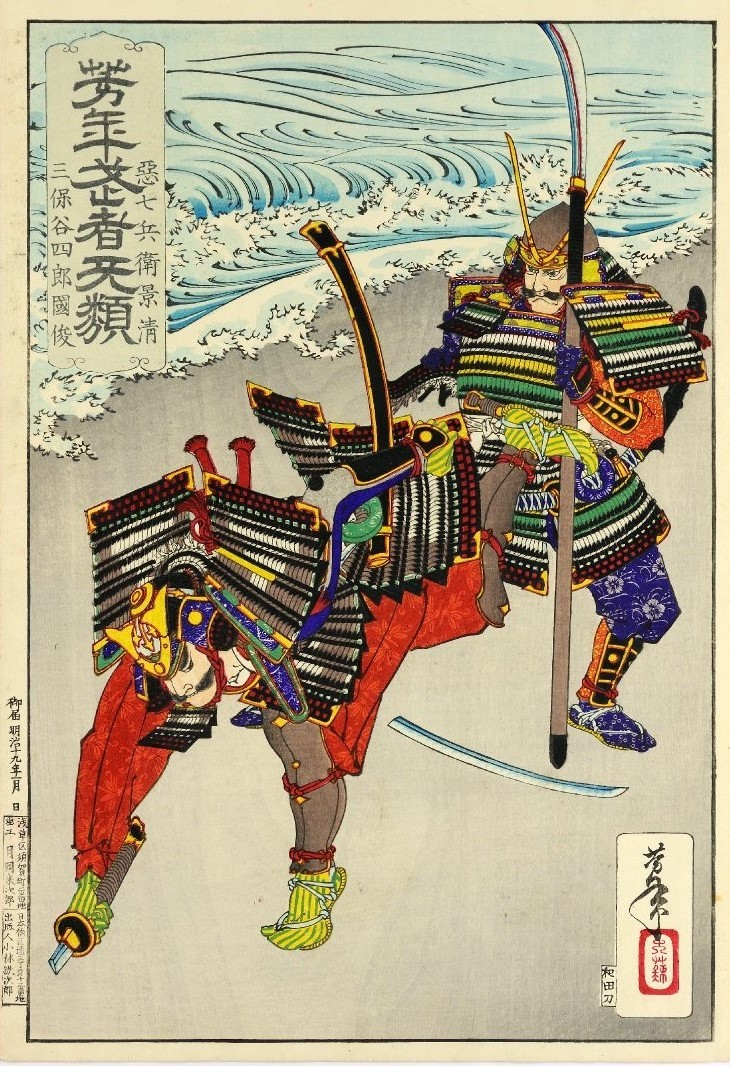
Kagekiyo (right) and Mihonoya Shiro Kunitoshi, woodblock print by Tsukioka Yoshitoshi

Taira no Kagekiyo (平 景清) (died 1196), also known as Kazusa no Shichirō (上総 七郎), was a samurai of the Taira clan who took part in the Genpei War of Japan, against the Minamoto clan.

The son by birth of Fujiwara no Tadakiyo. His original name was Fujiwara no Kagekiyo (藤原 景清), but he was adopted by the Taira and served them loyally the rest of his life. In 1156, he played a role in confirming Emperor Go-Shirakawa on the throne, and later, during the Genpei War, sought unsuccessfully to have the head of the Minamoto clan, Minamoto no Yoritomo, assassinated.

Kagekiyo is perhaps most famous for his appearance in the eleventh chapter of the fictionalized epic Heike Monogatari (The Tale of Heike) during the Battle of Yashima, in the section called "The Dropped Bow" (弓流). He grasps the neckguard of Minamoto warrior Mionoya no Jūrō in order to prevent his escape; Mionoya does escape Kagekiyo's grasp, hiding from battle behind a friendly mount. Then, Kagekiyo, leaning on his spear, exclaims "You must have heard of me long ago. See me now with your own eyes! I am the man known to the young city toughs as Akushichibyōe Kagekiyo of Kazusa!" Kagekiyo then retires from battle.

He was captured at the battle of Dan-no-ura in 1185. In 1196, Kagekiyo then allowed himself to starve to death at the new capital of Kamakura.

In the arcade game Genpei Toumaden, he is portrayed as a ghost who has risen from the dead in order to destroy Yoritomo.
