= Siege of Nara =

Siege in 1180 in Japan

Coordinates: 34.683333°N 135.8°E

- Part of the Genpei War
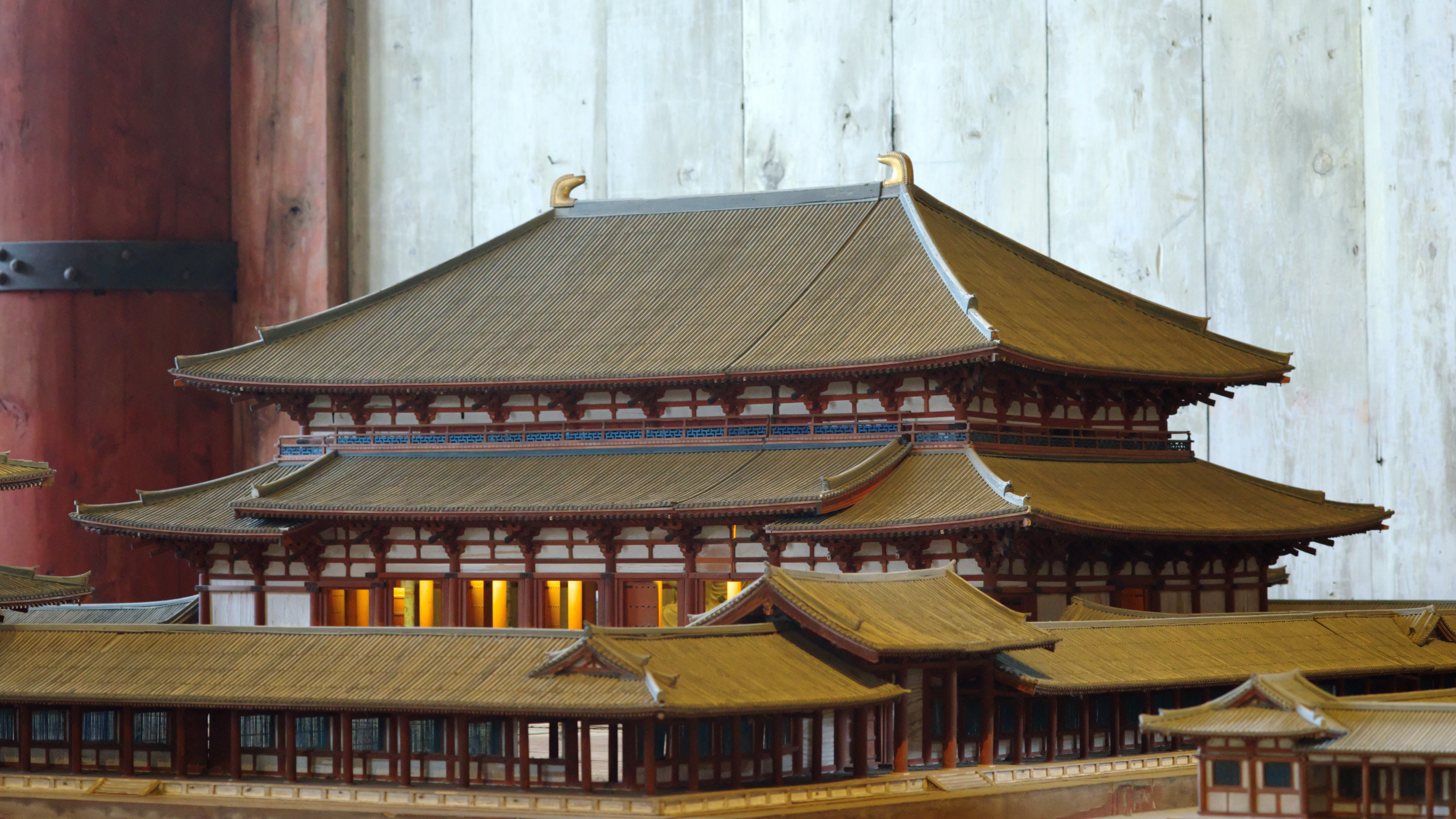
- A model of the Great Buddha Hall of Tōdai-ji that was burnt down in this siege (Founded in the 8th century)
Date	January 15, 1181 Julian Calendar (December 28, 1180 Jishō Calendar)
Location	Nara, Japan
Result	Taira victory; much of city destroyed

Belligerents
Taira clan	Warrior monks of various Nara temples

Commanders and leaders
Taira no Shigehira; Taira no Tomomori	Ygaku

Strength
Initial Mission: 500 samurai; Battle: 40,000 (likely exaggerated) or ~3,000	7,000 monks

Casualties and losses
Unknown	3,500 civilians, and 1,000 warrior monks

The siege of Nara (南都焼討, Nantō Yakiuchi) alternatively known as the Nanto Arson Campaign in Japan is an event which took place on January 15, 1181 (December 28, 1180 in the Jishō calendar), following Prince Mochihito and Minamoto no Yorimasa's defeat and subsequent death to the Taira clan, after which the Taira forces burnt down the Miidera temple (which had sheltered the anti-Taira forces), before moving on to Nara, where they "set fire to the monastic complexes of Kōfuku-ji and Tōdai-ji."

== Background ==
In June, after the suppression of Mochihito's army, the Taira clan punished Mii-dera Temple, which had been involved in the rebellion, by prohibiting it from participating in court sessions, dismissing its priests, and confiscating the temple's territory. Kōfuku-ji (one of the powerful Seven Great Temples in Nara) was not punished as severely as Mii-dera. At the end of the year, the people of Mii-dera and Kofuku-ji joined the uprising of the Ōmi Minamoto clan and others in the Omi Campaign, which finally led the Taira to turn the tables on Kofuku-ji when Taira Shigehira attacked and burned down Mii-dera.

Nara was regarded as a rebel against the throne because it had sided with Miidera and received Prince Takakura when he led the revolt. Once the temples at Nara had heard of this, they rose up like "a swarm of angry bees".

== Battle ==
Taira no Kiyomori first sent Seone Kaneyasu with 500 soldiers to Nara. Kiyomori instructed Kaneyasu to settle the matter in as peaceful a manner as possible and sent him off lightly armed. However, the monks of Nara captured and beheaded over 60 of Kaneyasu's men and lined them up at the edge of Sarusawa Pond, causing Kaneyasu to return to Kiyomori. A now infuriated Kiyomori sent Taira no Shigehira and Tomomori, both sons of Kiyomori, to siege Nara with "about 40,000 horsemen" (However, The Tale of the Heike is known for exaggerating numbers).

The monks, numbering around 7,000 men, began digging ditches in the roads, and built many forms of improvised defenses. They fought primarily with bow and arrow, and naginata, while the Taira were on horseback, giving them a great advantage.

Soon the Taira forces arrived, after which they divided into two, attacking the two defensive positions the monks had built. By nightfall, both positions had been broken through. Despite the monks' strategic defenses, their enemy succeeded in defeating even the best monks of Nara, and Shigehara ordered nearly every temple in the city to be lit, and the fire spread quickly due to the winds at the time. Soon the elderly and young (numbering roughly 1,000) began to flee into the Great Buddha Hall of the Tōdai-ji, but soon it was destroyed by fire too, with the Kofuku-ji falling as well. Only the Shōsōin survived.

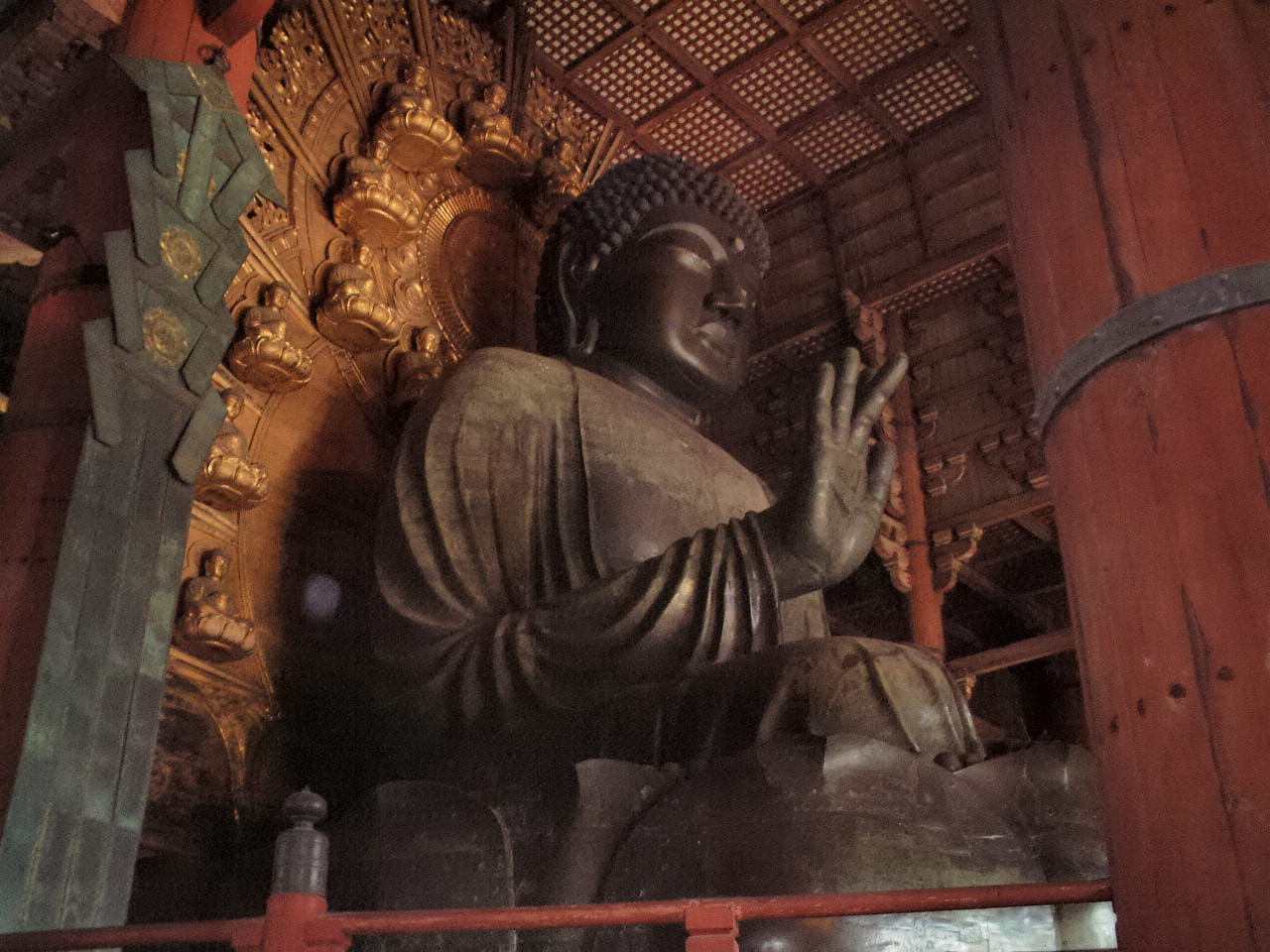
The Todai-ji Buddhist statue of Buddha

The Heike Monogatari laments the destruction of the Tōdai-ji's Daibutsu (Great Buddha statue) and Nara:

The colossal statue of Vairocana Buddha of copper and gold, whose domed head towered up into the clouds, from which gleamed the sacred jewel of his lofty forehead, fused with the heat, so that its fullmoon features fell to the pavement below, while its body melted into a shapeless mass. The myriad beauties of his Buddha Presence were hidden in the smoke like the autumn moon among the clouds [...]. The whole sky was filled with smoke, and the flames roared upward continually.

== Aftermath ==
In all, 3,500 non-combatants died in the burning of Nara, with another 1,000 warrior monks, some of whose heads where hung on the gates of the Hannya-ji, while some were carried back to Kyoto. Kiyomori alone was greatly rejoiced at the news, while the Empress, and the Retired Emperor all sorrowed at the destruction of so many temples, though somewhat pleased that the rebellious monks of Nara were exterminated. The courtiers had decided that the heads of the monks should be displayed on public scaffolds as punishment. However, they did not go through with any decisions regarding the tragic destruction of the Nara temples. In the writings of the Emperor Shōmu it says:

"When my temple of Kofukuji is prosperous the whole Empire shall be prosperous, and when my temple falls to ruin the Empire will decline also"

Due to this, many now believed the fall of the Empire was inevitable.
