= Battle of Kurikara Pass =

1183 battle of the Genpei War

- Part of the Genpei War
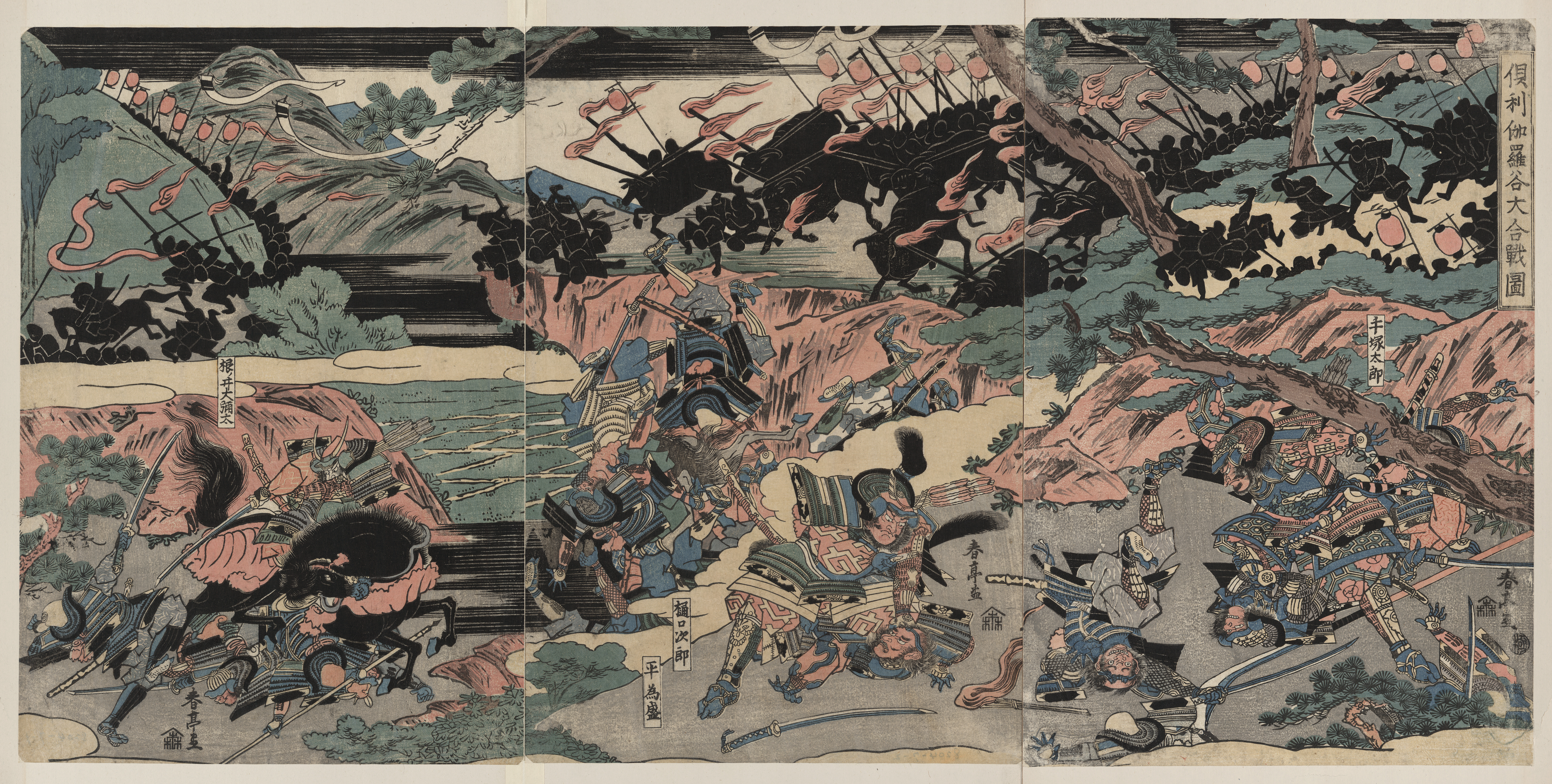
- Battle of Kurikara Pass by Katsukawa Shun'ei
| Date | June 2, 1183 |
| Location | Kurikara Pass, Tonamiyama, Etchū Province 36°39′42″N 136°49′16″E |
| Result | Minamoto victory; turning point in the war |

Belligerents
| Minamoto clan | Taira clan |

Commanders and leaders
| Minamoto no Yoshinaka; Minamoto no Yukiie | Taira no Koremori; Taira no Michimori |

Strength
| 5,000 | 40,000 |
- Location within Japan

The battle of Kurikara Pass (倶利伽羅峠の戦い, Kurikara tōge no tatakai), also known as the battle of Tonamiyama (砺波山), was a crucial engagement in Japan's Genpei War; in this battle the tide of the war turned in the favour of the Minamoto clan.

"Yoshinaka won by a clever strategy; under cover of nightfall his troops enveloped the main body of the Taira, demoralized them by a series of tactical surprises, and turned their confusion into a disastrous, headlong rout."

== Background ==
Minamoto no Yoshinaka, commander of a contingent of warriors from Shinano Province, invaded Taira lands in Shinano, Echigo, Etchū, Kaga and Echizen. The war was put on hold in 1181 on account of two years of famine. As conditions improved in 1183, the Taira sought retribution against Yoshinaka. Taira no Koremori, son of Taira no Shigemori and grandson of the late Taira no Kiyomori, took charge of this operation, backed by Taira Michimori, Tadanori, Taira no Tomonori, Taira no Tsunemasa and Taira no Kiyofusa. Their forces severely reduced by battle and famine, the Taira sought to recruit warriors from the surrounding lands and did so at the risk of further famine, since many of these warriors were farmers leaving their land. The Taira army departed from Kyoto on 10 May 1183.

Minamoto no Yoritomo, Yoshinaka's cousin, moved to fight him for dominance of the clan in March 1183, but was convinced to stand down and withdraw by Yoshinaka, who argued that they should be united against the Taira. To ensure his intentions, Yoshinaka also sent his son to Kamakura as a hostage. Shortly afterwards, Yoshinaka received news of Koremori's army, and moved to engage him, along with his uncle Minamoto no Yukiie, Tomoe Gozen, and his shitennō, Imai Kanehira, Higuchi Kanemitsu, Tate Chikatada and Nenoi Yukichika.

== Battle ==
Approaching the mountain passes which connect western Honshū to the east, Koremori split his forces in two, one part taking the Kurikara Pass (between Tsubata, Ishikawa and Oyabe, Toyama today) up to Tonamiyama, the other entering Etchū Province through Noto Province to the north. Minamoto no Yoshinaka, seeing the Taira forces coming up the pass, displayed thirty white banners on Kurosaka Hill a few kilometers away to trick his enemies into believing that his force was larger than it really was. This was a delaying tactic, aimed at keeping the Taira atop the pass until night fell, so that the second part of his strategy could fall in place.

He divided his own forces into three, sending one group to attack the Taira from the rear; a second beneath the Pass, as an ambush party; and the third he accompanied and held centrally. In order to conceal these movements, Yoshinaka sought to distract his enemy with a highly formal battle, beginning with archery exchanges using whistling-bulb arrows. This was followed by individual duels amongst a hundred samurai, to which the Taira gladly indulged, in the hopes of earning their individual places in the chronicles and epic poetry which were sure to follow such a war.

Meanwhile, Yoshinaka's armies moved into position, and as the sun set, the Taira turned to find behind them a Minamoto detachment, holding far more flags than a single detachment should merit, giving the illusion of greater numbers. Yoshinaka's central force, having gathered a herd of oxen, now released them down the pass directly into the Taira army, with lit torches tied to their horns, a strategy learned from the ancient Qi general Tian Dan. Many of the Taira warriors were simply knocked off the path. Yoshinaka's soldiers then charged down the north slope forcing the Taira down into the Kairaka Valley and Yoshinaka's ambush.

== Aftermath ==
The surviving Taira, confused, demoralized, and having suffered heavy losses, fled. This was a major victory for the Minamoto, leading to the Taira abandoning Kyoto.

== See also ==
- Toro embolado
