= Imai Kanehira =

Japanese samurai (1152–1184)

- 今井兼平
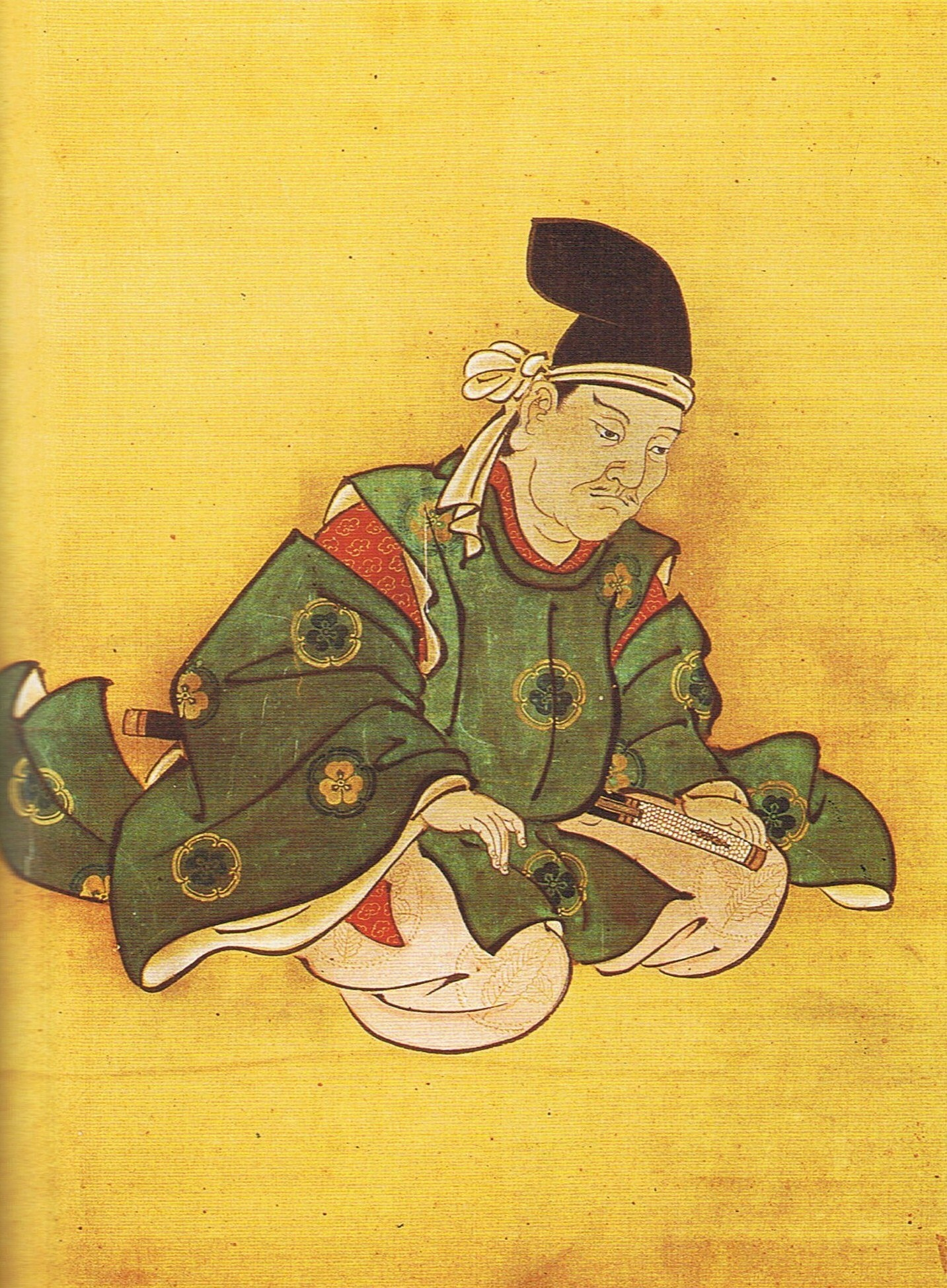
- Born: 1152
- Died: 1184 (aged 31–32)
- Cause of death: Suicide
- Military career
- Conflicts: Genpei War; Siege of Fukuryūji; Battle of Kurikara; Battle of Awazu

Imai Kanehira (今井兼平, 1152-1184) was a military commander of the late Heian Period of Japan. He was the son of Nakahara Kaneto and brother of Higuchi Kanemitsu.

He was the milk brother of Minamoto no Yoshinaka and Yoshinaka was fostered in Kanehira’s family thus they were close from childhood. Kanehira became joint commander of Yoshinaka's faction during the Genpei War after Yoshinaka met up with him at Seta and he was one of the Kiso Shitenno (the Kiso Shitenno were Yoshinaka‘s four key retainers).

His first major engagement was the Siege of Fukuryūji, where he commanded the Minamoto besiegers who successfully captured the fort. He fought with the forces of Minamoto no Yoshitsune, who wanted to bring an end to Yoshinaka's tyranny. Imai commanded Yoshinaka's forces when the two cousins met at the Battle of Awazu in 1184. He held off the attacks of Minamoto no Noriyori for a long time. However, when he heard of Yoshinaka's death from an arrow, he committed suicide by leaping off his horse while holding his sword in his mouth. The noh play Kanehira is about his ghost relating the story of Yoshinaka and himself, and how he wanted to go to the other side.

Kanehira's burial place is disputed, but largely believed that Kanehira's tumulus is in Kawanakajima, Nagano City. He also has tombs in Seiran, Otsu City, Shiga Prefecture. Hosai Shrine. Kanehira was enshrined as a god in Imai Shrine in Kawanakajima, Nagano City, and in Imai-jinja Shrine in Imai, Matsumoto City. Kanehira was also enshrined in Kisosansha-jinja Shrine, in Kitatachibana-machi, Shibukawa City, Gunma Prefecture.
