= Genpei War =

Conflict between the Minamoto and Taira clans of feudal Japan (1180–1185)

Genpei War (Jishō–Juei War)
- Part of Minamoto–Taira clan disputes of late Heian period
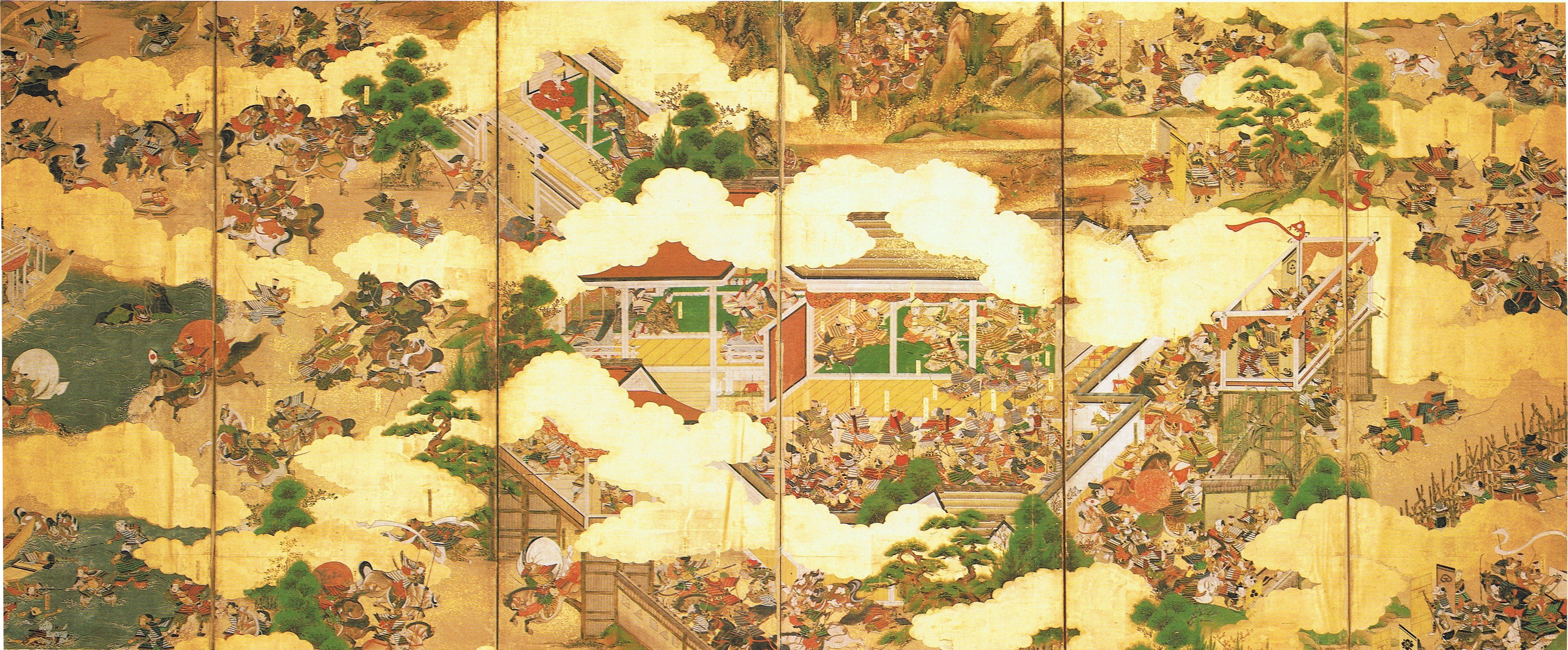
- Scene of the Genpei War
Date	June 20, 1180 – April 25, 1185 (4 years, 10 months, 2 weeks and 1 day)
Location	Japan
Result	Minamoto clan victory

Belligerents
Minamoto clan (Yoritomo): Miura clan; Takeda clan; Hōjō clan; Chiba clan	Taira clan	Minamoto clan (Yoshinaka)

Commanders and leaders
Minamoto no Yoritomo; Minamoto no Yoshitsune	Taira no Munemori (executed); Taira no Shigehira (executed); Taira no Tomomori †	Minamoto no Yoshinaka †; Imai Kanehira †

The Genpei War (源平合戦, Genpei Kassen, Genpei-Gassen; 1180–1185) was a national civil war between the Taira and Minamoto clans during the late Heian period of Japan. It resulted in the downfall of the Taira and the establishment of the Kamakura shogunate under Minamoto no Yoritomo, who appointed himself as Shōgun in 1192, governing Japan as a military dictator from the eastern city of Kamakura.

It followed a coup d'état by the Taira in 1179 with the removal of rivals from all government posts, and subsequently banishing them, and a call to arms against the Taira, led by the Minamoto in 1180. The ensuing Battle of Uji took place just outside Kyoto, starting a five-year-long war, concluding with a decisive Minamoto victory in the naval Battle of Dan-no-ura.

The name "Genpei" (Japanese pronunciation: [ɡem.pei, -peː], sometimes romanized as Gempei) comes from alternate readings of the kanji "Minamoto" (源 Gen) and "Taira" (平 Hei, pronounced as the second element in some compounds as -pei). The conflict is also known in Japanese as the Jishō–Juei War (治承・寿永の乱, Jishō–Juei no Ran), after the two Imperial eras between which it took place. The term Genpei Kassen is sometimes used in Japan, but it has been argued that it is not appropriate to use the term "Genpei" for this war.

== Background ==
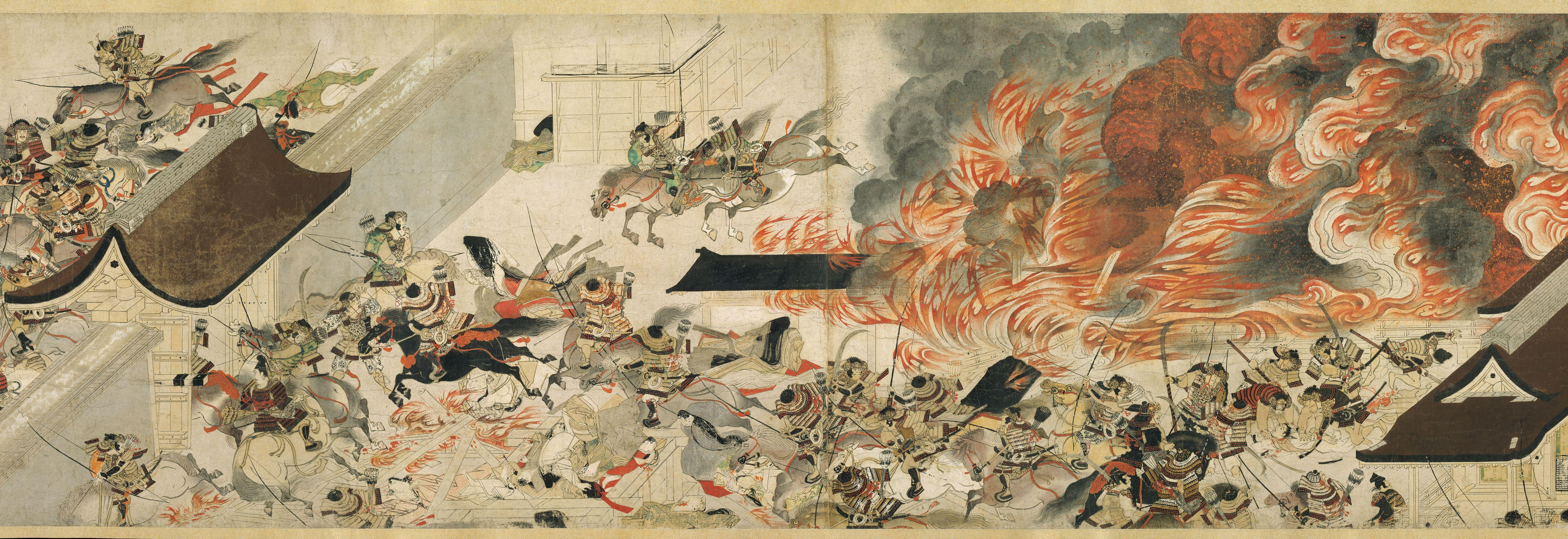
The Heiji rebellion (1159) and the subsequent rise of the Taira were the main cause of the Genpei War 20 years later.

The Genpei War was the culmination of a decades-long conflict between the two aforementioned clans over dominance of the Imperial court and, by extension, control of Japan. In the Hōgen Rebellion and in the Heiji Rebellion of earlier decades, the Minamoto attempted to regain control from the Taira and failed.

In 1180, Taira no Kiyomori put his grandson Antoku (then only 2 years of age) on the throne after the abdication of Emperor Takakura. Emperor Go-Shirakawa's son Mochihito felt that he was being denied his rightful place on the throne and, with the help of Minamoto no Yorimasa, sent out a call to arms to the Minamoto clan and Buddhist monasteries in May. However, this plot ended with the deaths of Yorimasa and Mochihito.

In June 1180, Kiyomori moved the seat of imperial power to Fukuhara-kyō, "his immediate objective seems to have been to get the royal family under his close charge."

== History ==
=== Beginnings of the war ===
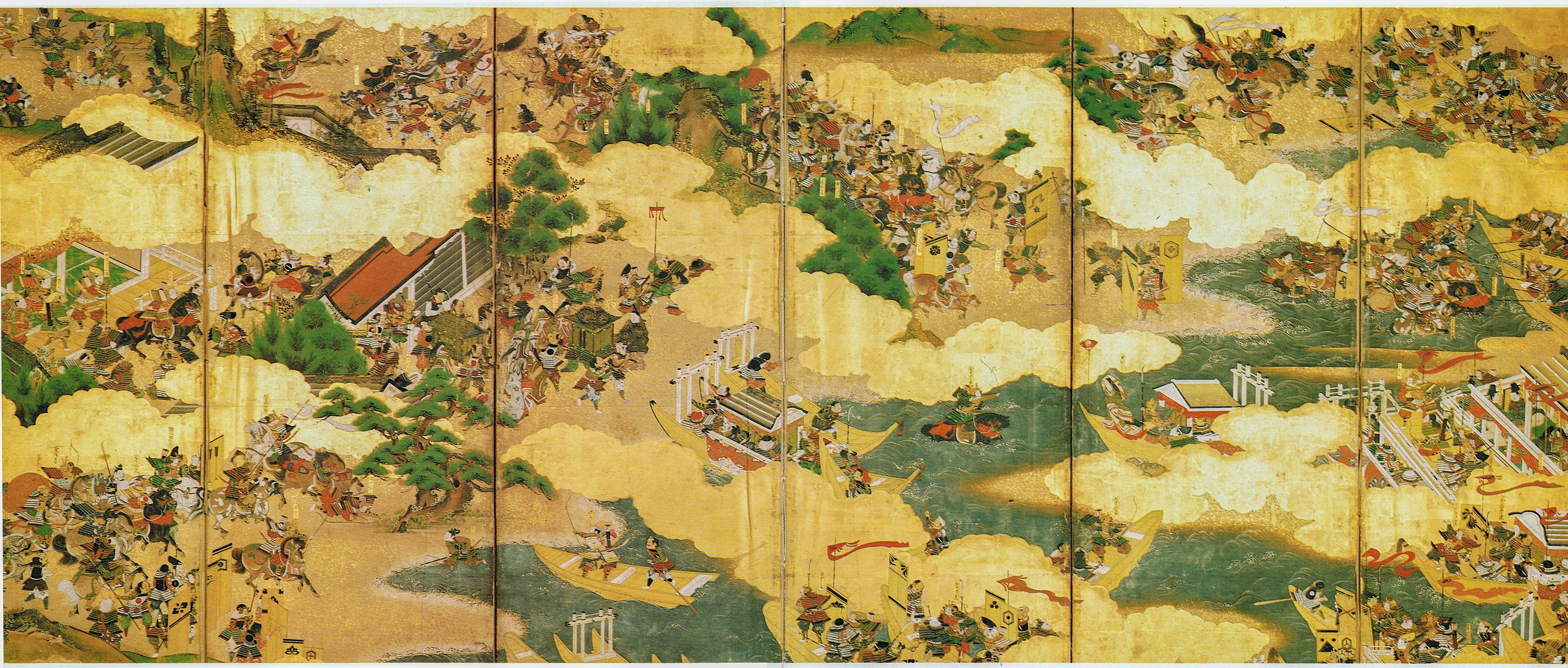
Scene of the Genpei war (1180–85), Kanō Motonobu (1476–1569), Muromachi period (1336–1573).

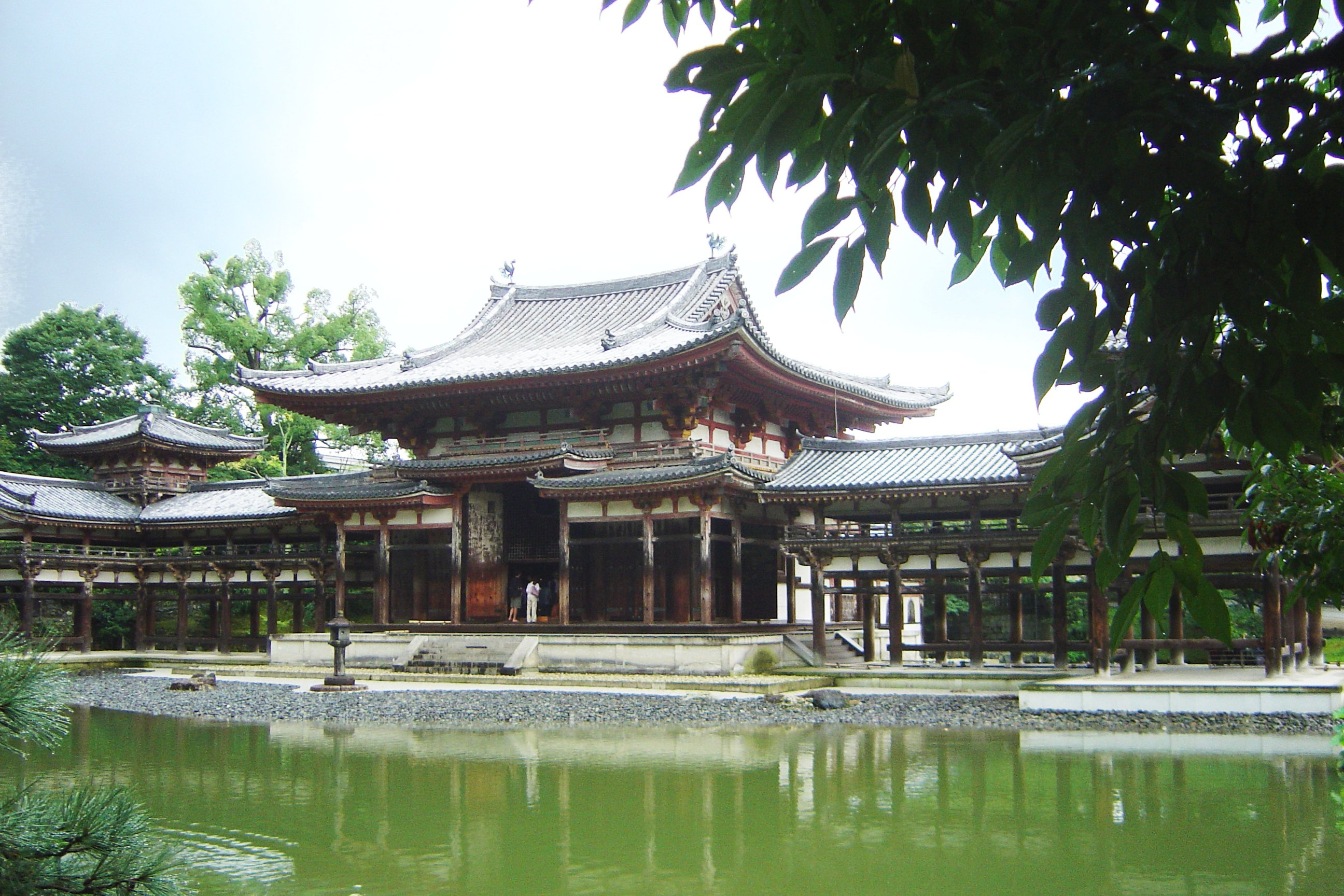
The Phoenix Hall of the Byōdō-in, where Yorimasa committed seppuku

The actions of Taira no Kiyomori having deepened Minamoto hatred for the Taira clan, a call for arms was sent up by Minamoto no Yorimasa and Prince Mochihito. Not knowing who was behind this rally, Kiyomori called for the arrest of Mochihito, who sought protection at the temple of Mii-dera. The Mii-dera monks were unable to ensure him sufficient protection, so he was forced to move along. He was then chased by Taira forces to the Byōdō-in, just outside Kyoto. The war began thus, with a dramatic encounter on and around the bridge over the River Uji. This battle ended in Yorimasa's ritual suicide inside the Byōdō-in and Mochihito's capture and execution shortly afterwards.

It was at this point that Minamoto no Yoritomo took over leadership of the Minamoto clan and began traveling the country seeking to rendezvous with allies. Leaving Izu Province and heading for the Hakone Pass, he was defeated by the Taira in the battle of Ishibashiyama. However, he successfully made it to the provinces of Kai and Kōzuke, where the Takeda and other friendly families helped repel the Taira army. Meanwhile, Kiyomori, seeking vengeance against the Mii-dera monks and others, besieged Nara and burnt much of the city to the ground.

Fighting continued the following year, 1181. Minamoto no Yukiie was defeated by a force led by Taira no Shigehira at the Battle of Sunomatagawa. However, the "Taira could not follow up their victory."

Taira no Kiyomori died from illness in the spring of 1181, and around the same time Japan began to suffer from a famine which was to last through the following year. The Taira moved to attack Minamoto no Yoshinaka, a cousin of Yoritomo who had raised forces in the north, but were unsuccessful. For nearly two years, the war ceased, only to resume in the spring of 1183.

=== Turning of the tide ===
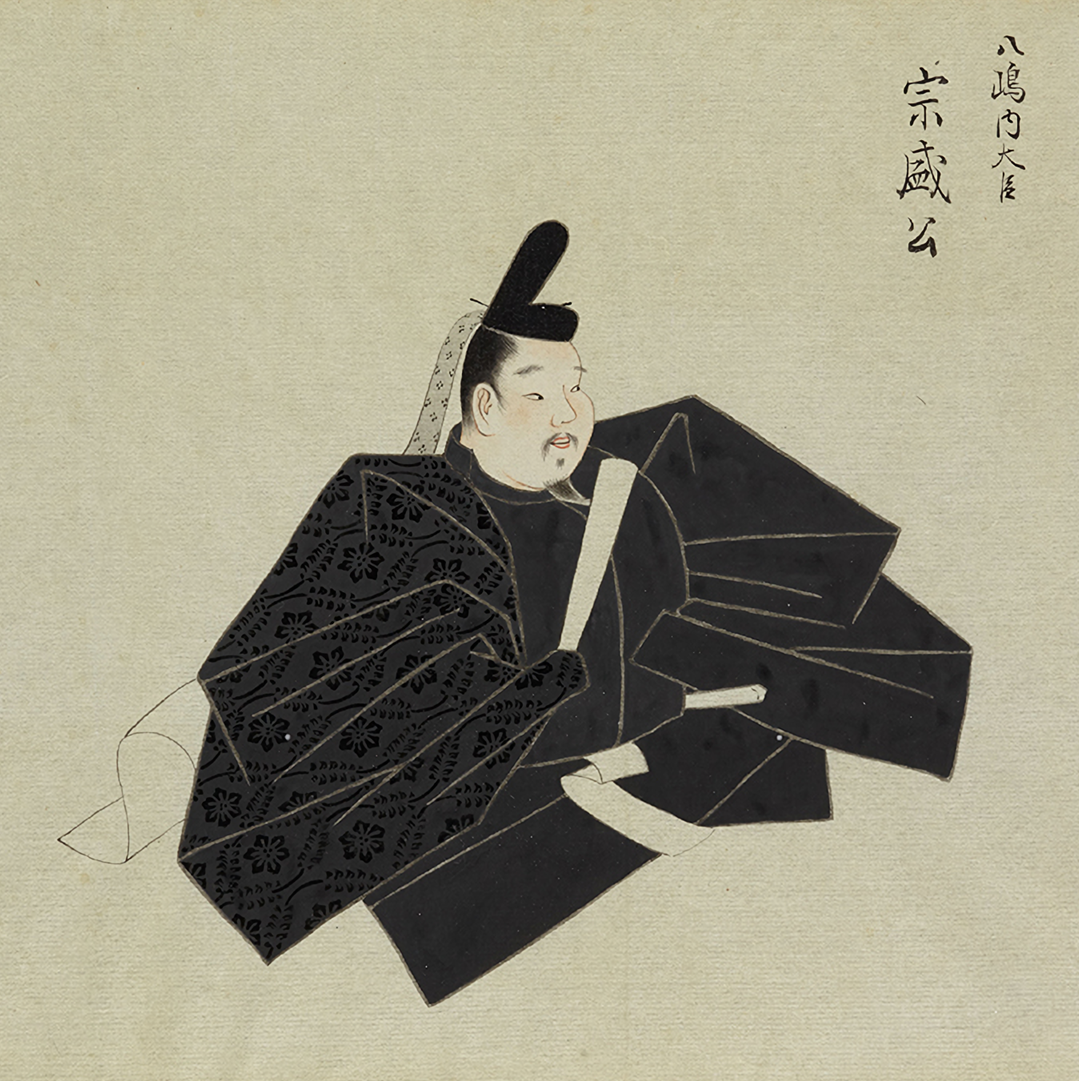
Taira no Munemori

In 1183, the Taira loss at the Battle of Kurikara was so severe that they found themselves several months later under siege in Kyoto with Yoshinaka approaching the city from the north and Yukiie from the east. Both Minamoto leaders had seen little or no opposition in marching to the capital and now forced the Taira to flee the city. Taira no Munemori, head of the clan since his father Kiyomori's death, led his army, along with the young Emperor Antoku and the Imperial regalia, to the west. The cloistered emperor Go-Shirakawa defected to Yoshinaka. Go-Shirakawa then issued a mandate for Yoshinaka to "join with Yukiie in destroying Munemori and his army".

In 1183, Yoshinaka once again sought to gain control of the Minamoto clan by planning an attack on Yoritomo, while simultaneously pursuing the Taira westward. The Taira set up a temporary Court at Dazaifu in Kyūshū, the southernmost of Japan's main islands. They were forced out soon afterwards by local revolts instigated by Go-Shirakawa, and moved their Court to Yashima. The Taira were successful in beating off an attack by Yoshinaka's pursuing forces at the Battle of Mizushima.

Yoshinaka conspired with Yukiie to seize the capital and the Emperor, possibly even establishing a new Court in the north. However, Yukiie revealed these plans to the Emperor, who communicated them to Yoritomo. Betrayed by Yukiie, Yoshinaka took command of Kyoto and, at the beginning of 1184, set fire to the Hōjūjidono, taking the Emperor into custody. Minamoto no Yoshitsune arrived soon afterwards with his brother Noriyori and a considerable force, driving Yoshinaka from the city. After fighting his cousins at the bridge over the Uji, Yoshinaka made his final stand at Awazu, in Ōmi Province. He was defeated by Yoshitsune, and killed while attempting to flee.

=== Final stages ===
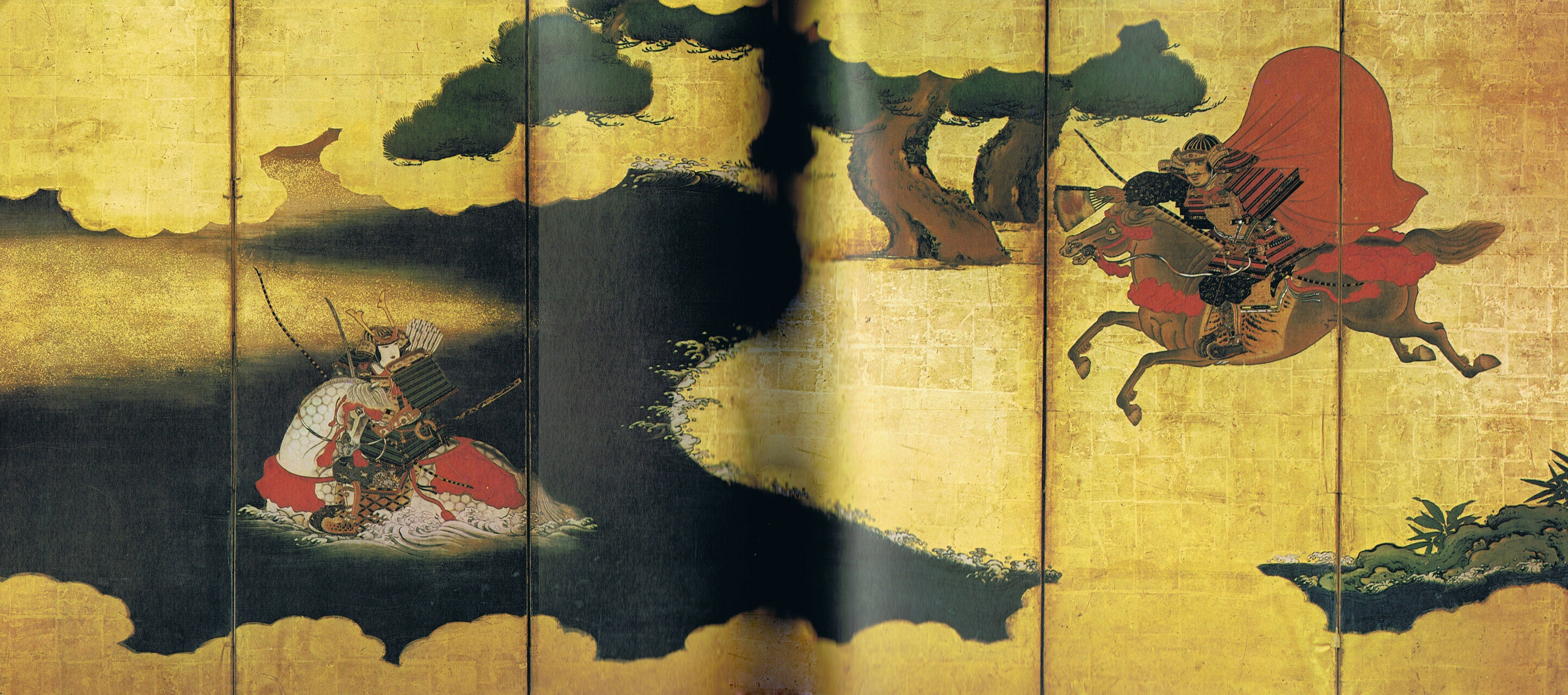
Duel between Taira no Atsumori (left) and Kumagai Naozane

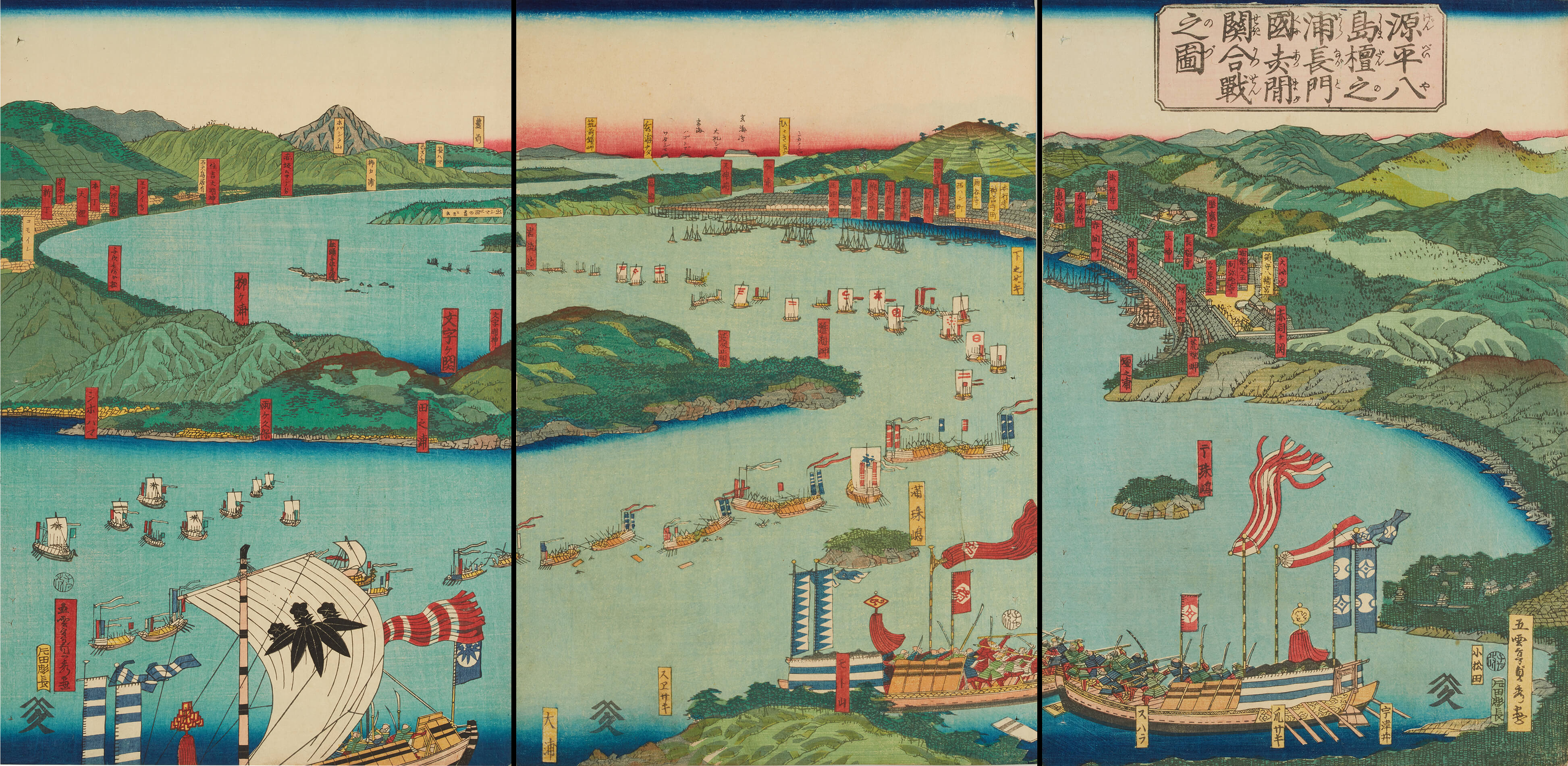
Battle of Dan-no-ura

As the united Minamoto forces left Kyoto, the Taira began consolidating their position at a number of sites in and around the Inland Sea, which was their ancestral home territory. They received a number of missives from the Emperor offering that if they surrendered by the seventh day of the second month, the Minamoto could be persuaded to agree to a truce. This was a farce, as neither the Minamoto nor the Emperor had any intentions of waiting until the eighth day to attack. Nevertheless, this tactic offered the Emperor a chance to regain the Regalia and to distract the Taira leadership.

The Minamoto army, led by Yoshitsune and Noriyori, made their first major assault at Ichi-no-Tani, one of the primary Taira camps on Honshū. The camp was attacked from two directions by Yoshitsune and Noriyori, and the Taira not killed or captured retreated to Yashima. However, the Minamoto were not prepared to assault Shikoku; a six-month pause thus ensued during which the Minamoto took the proper steps. Though on the retreat, the Taira enjoyed the distinct advantages of being in friendly, home territories, and of being far more adept at naval combat than their rivals.

It was not until nearly a year after the battle of Ichi-no-Tani that the main Taira force at Yashima came under assault. Seeing Yoshitsune's bonfires in their rear, the Taira had not expected a land-based attack and took to their ships. This was a deceptive ploy on the part of the Minamoto, however. The Taira improvised imperial palace fell, and many escaped along with the Imperial regalia and the Emperor Antoku.

The Genpei War came to an end one month later, following the battle of Dan-no-ura, one of the most famous and significant battles in Japanese history. The Minamoto engaged the Taira fleet in the Straits of Shimonoseki, a tiny body of water separating the islands of Honshū and Kyūshū. The tides played a powerful role in the development of the battle, granting the advantage first to the Taira, who were more experienced and abler sailors, and later to the Minamoto. The Minamoto advantage was considerably enhanced by the defection of Taguchi, a Shikoku warrior who went over to the Minamoto side in the middle of the action. Many of the Taira nobles perished, along with Emperor Antoku and the widow of Kiyomori.

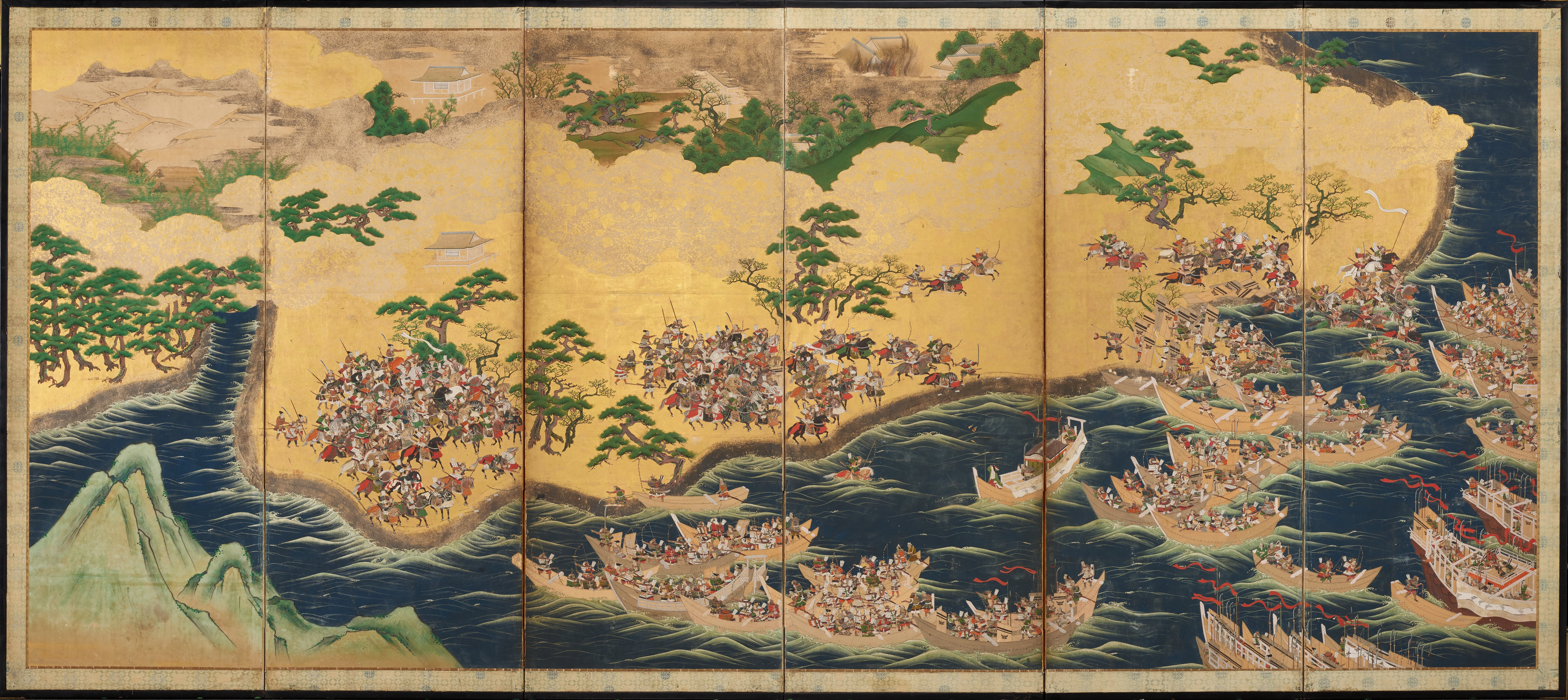
Battle of Yashima folding screen

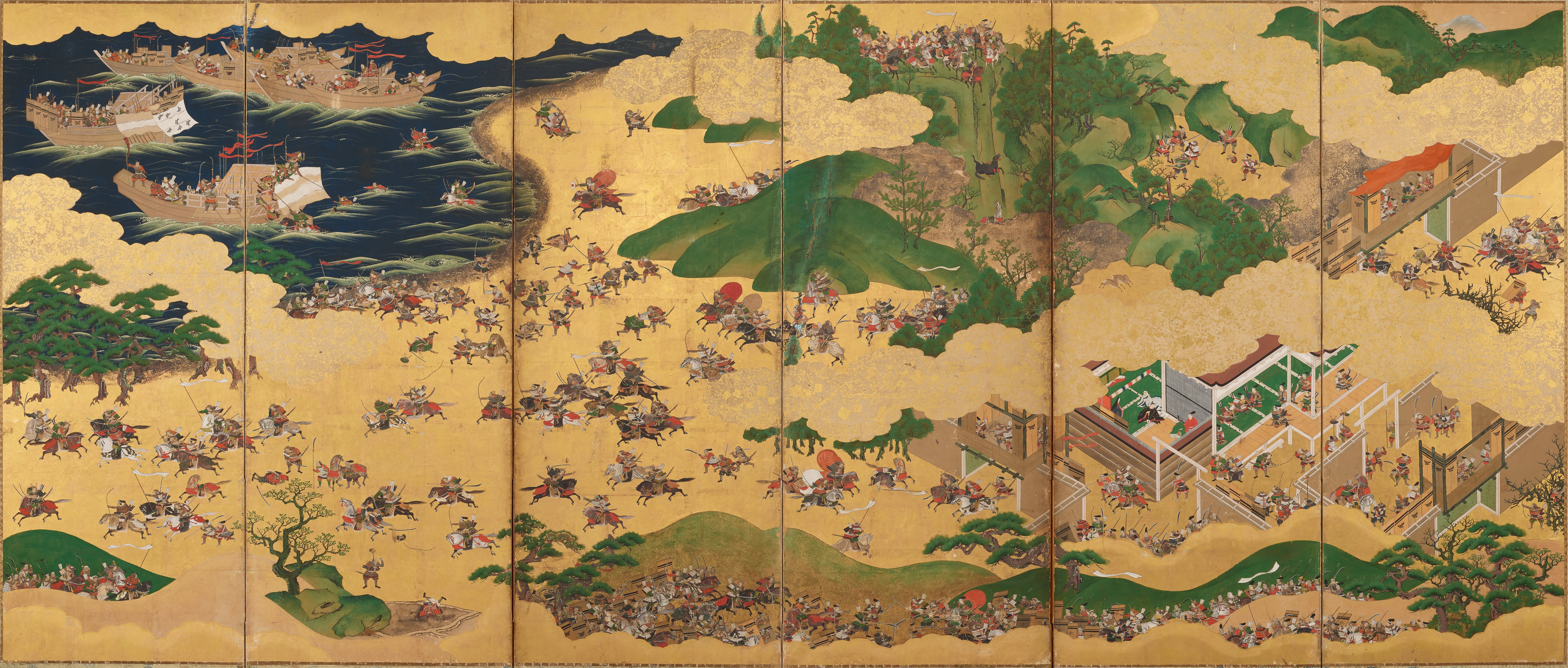
Battle of Ichi-no-Tani folding screen

== Consequences of the Genpei War ==
The defeat of the Taira armies meant the end of Taira "dominance at the capital". In December 1185, Go-Shirakawa granted to Yoritomo the power to collect taxes, and "appoint stewards and constables in all provinces". Finally, in 1192, after Go-Shirakawa's death, Yoritomo was granted the imperial commission Sei-i Tai Shōgun. This was the beginning of a feudal state in Japan, with real power now in Kamakura. However, Kyoto remained the "seat of national ceremony and ritual" and the de jure capital.

== Aftermath ==
The end of the Genpei War and beginning of the Kamakura shogunate marked the rise to power of the warrior class (samurai) and the gradual suppression of the power of the emperor, who was compelled to govern without effective political or military power, being effectively reduced to a purely symbolical and ceremonial head of state, until the Meiji Restoration over 650 years later, though there was a short-lived attempt to restore imperial rule in the 1330s, the Kenmu Restoration.

In addition, this war and its aftermath established red and white, the colors of the Taira and Minamoto standards, respectively, as Japan's national colors. Today, these colors can be seen on the flag of Japan, and also in banners and flags in sumo and other traditional activities.

== Definition ==
=== Extent ===
It has been pointed out that the Battle of Ōshū fought between the Kamakura government and the Northern Fujiwara in 1189 was in fact the last battle during this period of civil war, as it completed Yoritomo's nationwide domination through the annexation of Dewa and Mutsu Province, and that its end marked the establishment of the first military government, the Kamakura shogunate.

=== Name ===
The terms Genpei Kassen (源平合戦), Genpei Sōran (源平争乱) and Genpei no Tatakai (源平の戦い) are sometimes used in Japan, but it has been argued that it is not appropriate to use the term "Genpei" for this war, as it does not accurately represent the belligerents of the war. In fact, the head of the Minamoto clan at the time was not a samurai but a court noble, and the first samurai to be the head of the clan was Ashikaga Yoshimitsu in the 14th century.

In reality, it was not exclusively a war between the Minamoto clan and the Taira clan, and there were many members of the Taira clan fighting on Minamoto clan's side, as well as members of these two clans serving as court nobles at the Imperial Court that were not samurai and had nothing to do with the war. There is no record of any direct or indirect complicity or assistance by the non-samurai Minamoto and Taira clan members to the war, and no record of any motive for their involvement exists.

Furthermore, the Battle of Ōshū was fought between Minamoto no Yoritomo and his last strong enemy, the Northern Fujiwara, years after the Taira clan had been destroyed.

It is true that many members of the Minamoto clan, such as Takeda Nobuyoshi and Minamoto no Yoshinaka, rose to arms against the Taira clan. There were also many who belonged to the Minamoto clan, but who fought for the Taira clan because they had a kinship or a duty to the Taira clan. Although the various Minamoto clans rose up simultaneously, not all of them were under the command of Minamoto no Yoritomo from the beginning. In fact, the actual Kawachi Genji had no single legitimate lineage, and even if we were to limit ourselves to the succession of Minamoto no Yoshiie, who was the representative samurai of the Kawachi Genji, it was not only Yoritomo who could have claimed that position. Yoritomo was the heir of Yoshitomo, who had risen to that position by killing his father and younger brother during the Battle of Ōkura in 1155. However, Minamoto no Yoshinaka, the heir of Minamoto no Yoshikata, and Yukiie, the younger brother of Yoshitomo and Yoshikata, could have claimed the position as well.

== Battles ==
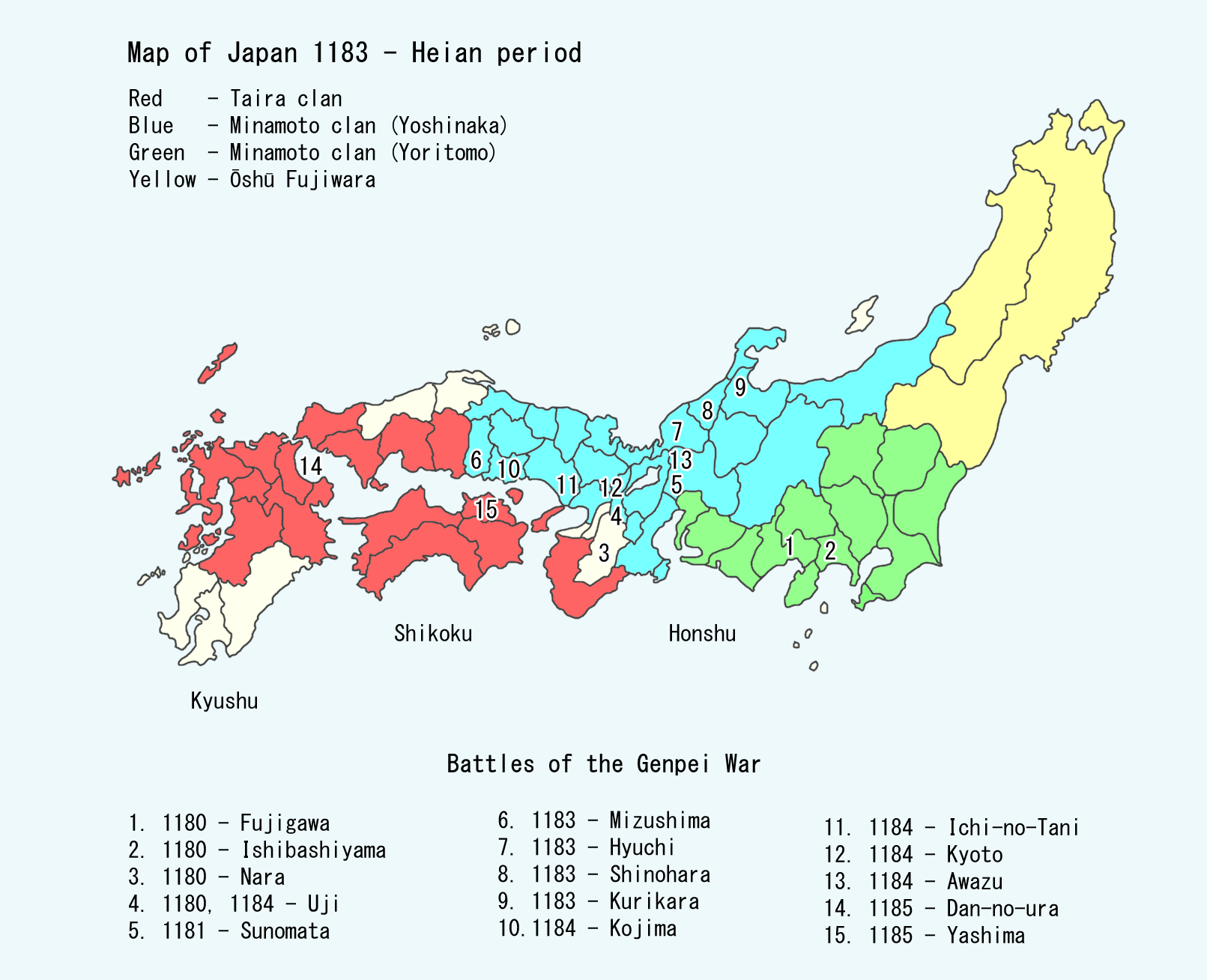
A sphere map on 1183 at Genpei War. However, it was not clearly divided in this way, and there were conflicts among Genjis as well as Tairas.

- 1180 First Battle of Uji – regarded as the first battle in the Genpei Wars, the monks of the Byōdōin fight alongside Minamoto no Yorimasa.
- 1180 Siege of Nara – the Taira set fire to temples and monasteries, to cut supplies to their rivals.
- 1180 Battle of Ishibashiyama – Minamoto no Yoritomo's first battle against the Taira, who are victorious.
- 1180 Battle of Fujikawa – the Taira mistake a flock of waterfowl for a sneak attack by the Minamoto in the night, and retreat before any fighting occurs.
- 1181 Battle of Sunomatagawa – the Taira thwart a sneak attack in the night but retreat.
- 1181 Battle of Yahagigawa – the Minamoto, retreating from Sunomata, attempt to make a stand.
- 1183 Siege of Hiuchi – the Taira attack a Minamoto fortress.
- 1183 Battle of Kurikara – the tide of the war turns, in the Minamoto's favor.
- 1183 Battle of Shinohara – Yoshinaka pursues the Taira force from Kurikara
- 1183 Battle of Mizushima – the Taira intercept a Minamoto force, heading for Yashima.
- 1183 Siege of Fukuryūji – the Minamoto attack a Taira fortress.
- 1183 Battle of Muroyama – Minamoto no Yukiie tries and fails to recoup the loss of the battle of Mizushima.
- 1184 Siege of Hōjūjidono – Yoshinaka sets fire to the Hōjūji-dono and kidnaps Emperor Go-Shirakawa.
- 1184 Second Battle of Uji – Yoshinaka is pursued out of the capital by Yoshitsune and Noriyori.
- 1184 Battle of Awazu – Minamoto no Yoshinaka is defeated and killed by Yoshitsune and Noriyori.
- 1184 Battle of Ichi-no-Tani – Minamoto no Yoshitsune attacks and drives the Taira from one of their primary fortresses.
- 1184 Battle of Kojima – Taira fleeing Ichi-no-Tani are attacked by Minamoto no Noriyori.
- 1185 Battle of Yashima – the Minamoto assault their enemies' fortress, just off Shikoku.
- 1185 Battle of Dan-no-ura – Minamoto no Yoshitsune decisively defeats Taira forces in naval battle ending the war.

== Major figures ==
=== Minamoto Clan (also known as "Genji") ===
Minamoto no Yoritomo, from an 1179 hanging scroll by Fujiwara no Takanobu

The Minamoto were one of the four great clans that dominated Japanese politics during the Heian period (794–1185). They were, however, decimated by the Taira in the Heiji Rebellion of 1160. Minamoto no Yoshitomo had been the head of the clan at this time; upon his defeat at the hands of Taira no Kiyomori, two of his sons were killed and the third, Minamoto no Yoritomo, was banished. Following the call to arms of Prince Mochihito and Minamoto no Yorimasa in 1180, the clan would gather together and rise to power again. The Genpei war would see the Minamoto clan defeat the Taira and take command of the entire country.

- Minamoto no Noriyori (源範頼), general, younger brother of Yoritomo.
- Minamoto no Yorimasa (源頼政), head of the clan at the beginning of the war.
- Minamoto no Yoritomo (源頼朝), head of the clan upon Yorimasa's death.
- Minamoto no Yoshitsune (源義経), younger brother of Yoritomo, chief general of the clan.
- Minamoto no Yukiie (源行家), general, uncle to Yoritomo.
- Allies and vassals:
  - Emperor Go-Shirakawa (後白河), cloistered (retired) emperor.
  - Prince Mochihito (以仁王), Imperial Prince.
  - Benkei (弁慶), sōhei (warrior monk), ally of Yoshitsune.
  - Hōjō Tokimasa (北条 時政), head of the Hōjō clan (北条), father-in-law of Yoritomo.
  - Kajiwara Kagetoki (梶原 景時), officially an ally of Yoshitsune, in fact a spy for Yoritomo.
  - Kumagai Naozane (熊谷 直実), vassal of Yoritomo.
  - Sasaki Moritsuna (佐々木 盛綱), vassal of Noriyori who commanded the assault at the battle of Kojima.
  - Taguchi Shigeyoshi (田口 重能), Taira general who turned to the Minamoto camp upon seeing the tide turn at the battle of Dan no Ura, thus ensuring Minamoto victory.
  - Nasu no Yoichi (那須与一), celebrated archer and Minamoto ally.
  - Yada Yoshiyasu (矢田 義康), vassal of Yoshinaka and commander of Minamoto forces at the battle of Mizushima.
  - The sōhei (warrior-monks) of Mii-dera and other temples. Three in particular are mentioned in the Heike Monogatari for their part in the first battle of Uji:
    - Tsutsui Jōmyō Meishū (筒井 浄妙 明秀), who fought a last stand on the bridge over the Uji, taking over sixty arrows and still fighting.
    - Gochi-in no Tajima (五智院 但馬), called Tajima the arrow-cutter, and famous for deflecting the Taira arrows with his naginata, upon the bridge over the Uji.
    - Ichirai Hoshi (一来 法師), who is famous for having jumped ahead of Jōmyō Meishū and led the Mii-dera monks to battle.
- Partisans of Minamoto no Yoshinaka (源義仲), cousin of Yoritomo, who supported his rebellion:
  - Imai Kanehira (今井 兼平), who joined Yoshinaka in his escape to Seta.

=== Taira Clan (also known as "Heike") ===
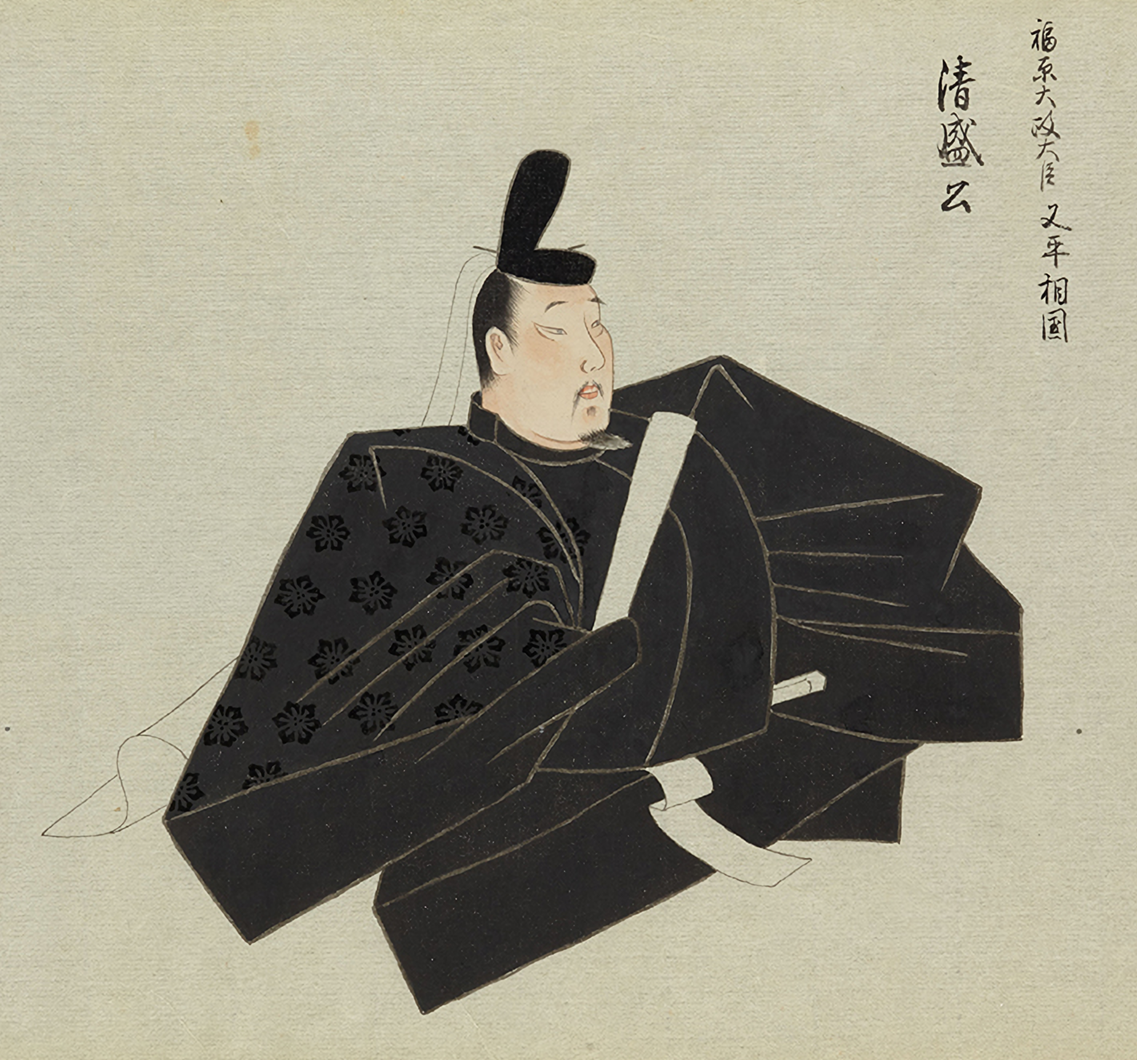
Taira no Kiyomori, by Fujiwara Tamenobu and Takenobu

The Taira clan was one of the four great clans which dominated Japanese politics during the Heian period (794–1185). As a result of the near-total destruction of their rival clan, the Minamoto, in the Heiji Rebellion of 1160, Taira no Kiyomori, head of the clan, initiated the Genpei War at the height of his power. The end of the war, however, brought destruction to the Taira clan.

- Taira no Atsumori (平敦盛), young samurai killed by Kumagai Naozane who, because of his youth and innocence, became quite famous in death.
- Taira no Kiyomori (平清盛), head of the clan at the beginning of the war.
- Taira no Koremori (平維盛), grandson of Kiyomori.
- Taira no Munemori (平宗盛), son and heir of Kiyomori; head of the clan for much of the war.
- Taira no Noritsune (平教経), a Taira samurai.
- Taira no Shigehira (平重衡), general, son of Kiyomori.
- Taira no Tadanori (平忠度), general, brother of Kiyomori.
- Taira no Tokiko (平時子), wife of Kiyomori who committed suicide at the battle of Dan-no-ura.
- Taira no Tomomori (平知盛), general, son of Kiyomori.
- Taira no Yukimori (平行盛), general, commander of the Taira forces at the battle of Kojima.
- Taira no Kagekiyo (平景清), a Taira samurai, adopted from the Fujiwara clan.
- Allies and vassals:
  - Emperor Antoku (安徳), Emperor of Japan and grandson of Taira no Kiyomori.
  - Ōba Kagechika (大庭景親), vassal of the Taira.
  - Saitō Sanemori (斎藤実盛), former vassal of Minamoto no Yoshitomo, switched sides and became a vassal of Taira no Munenori.
  - Senoo Kaneyasu (妹尾兼康), vassal of the Taira who commanded at the Fukuryūji fortress.
  - Taguchi Shigeyoshi (田口重能), Taira general who turned to the Minamoto camp upon seeing the tide turn at the battle of Dan no Ura, thus ensuring Minamoto victory.
  - The sōhei (warrior-monks) of Enryaku-ji (延暦寺), at least in theory, on account of their rivalry with the Mii-dera sōhei, who were allied with the Minamoto.

== In literature ==
Many stories and works of art depict this conflict. The Tale of the Heike (平家物語, Heike Monogatari) is the most famous, although many kabuki and bunraku plays reproduce events of the war as well. Ichinotani Futaba Gunki ('Chronicle of the battle of Ichi-no-Tani') by Namiki Sōsuke may be one of the more famous of these.

The novel Shike by Robert Shea features a somewhat fictionalized account of the wars, as seen from the perspectives of his two main characters, the Zinja Monk Jebu, and the Noblewoman Lady Shima Taniko. The names of the two rival clans have been changed, "Minamoto" to "Muratomo" and "Taira" to "Takashi".

Another fictionalized account of the conflict forms the central plot of "Civil War" (also known as "Turbulent Times"), the ninth volume of Osamu Tezuka's celebrated Phoenix series of comics.

The Genpei War is the backdrop for much of Katherine Patterson's young adult novel, Of Nightingales That Weep.

== In popular culture ==
=== Literary fiction ===
The entire story of Yoshitsune has been told in a novel form by Pamela S. Turner in the book Samurai Rising: The Epic Life of Minamoto Yoshitsune (2016).

=== Podcasts ===
Daniele Bolelli covered the story of the Genpei War in two episodes of his History on Fire podcast.

=== Film and television ===
- The science-communicating book Cosmos (1980) and subsequent television series Cosmos: A Personal Voyage (1980), presented by Carl Sagan, features the Genpei War in the second episode, "One Voice in the Cosmic Fugue", broadcast on 5 October 1980, as an introduction to discuss the phenomenon of the Heike Crabs.
- The conflict between the Genji and Heike gangs in the 2007 Japanese Western film Sukiyaki Western Django mirrors that of the actual Genpei war, albeit "a few hundred years after."
- The 61st Taiga Drama, The 13 Lords of the Shogun, features the Genpei War in the first 17 episodes.

=== Games ===
- Cinemaware's 1989 Amiga title Lords of the Rising Sun features the Genpei War.
- On 21 September 2011, The Creative Assembly released a DLC pack for Total War: Shogun 2 entitled "Rise of the Samurai", which allows players to play as members of the Taira, the Minamoto, or the Fujiwara families. Through a complex system of province building, diplomacy, research, and combat, players can decide the outcome of the Genpei War for themselves.
- "The Forgotten", an expansion developed for Ensemble Studios's 1999 Age of Empires II which was released for free with 2013's Age of Empires II: HD Edition included a scenario based loosely on the Battle of Kurikara. The player attacks five Taira princes before taking Kyoto.
- Namco's 1986 arcade horror/fantasy Genpei Tōmaden imagines the outcome of the Genpei War bringing an age of darkness to Japan, with a resurrected Taira no Kagekiyo tasked to defeat a demonic rendition of Minamoto no Yoritomo.
- The 2005 action game Genji: Dawn of the Samurai and its sequel, are set in a more fantastical reimagining of the conflict.
- In the Nioh 2 DLC The Tengu's Disciple, the Protagonist travels back in time to the Genpei War.

== See also ==
- Kuroshima and Taijima, a set of islands off the coast of Wakayama used as a naval base during the war
- Military history of Japan
- Outline of war
- Sanemori (Noh play)
- Sukiyaki Western Django, a film inspired by the events
