= Siege of Fukuryūji =

12th century battle in Japan

- Part of the Genpei War
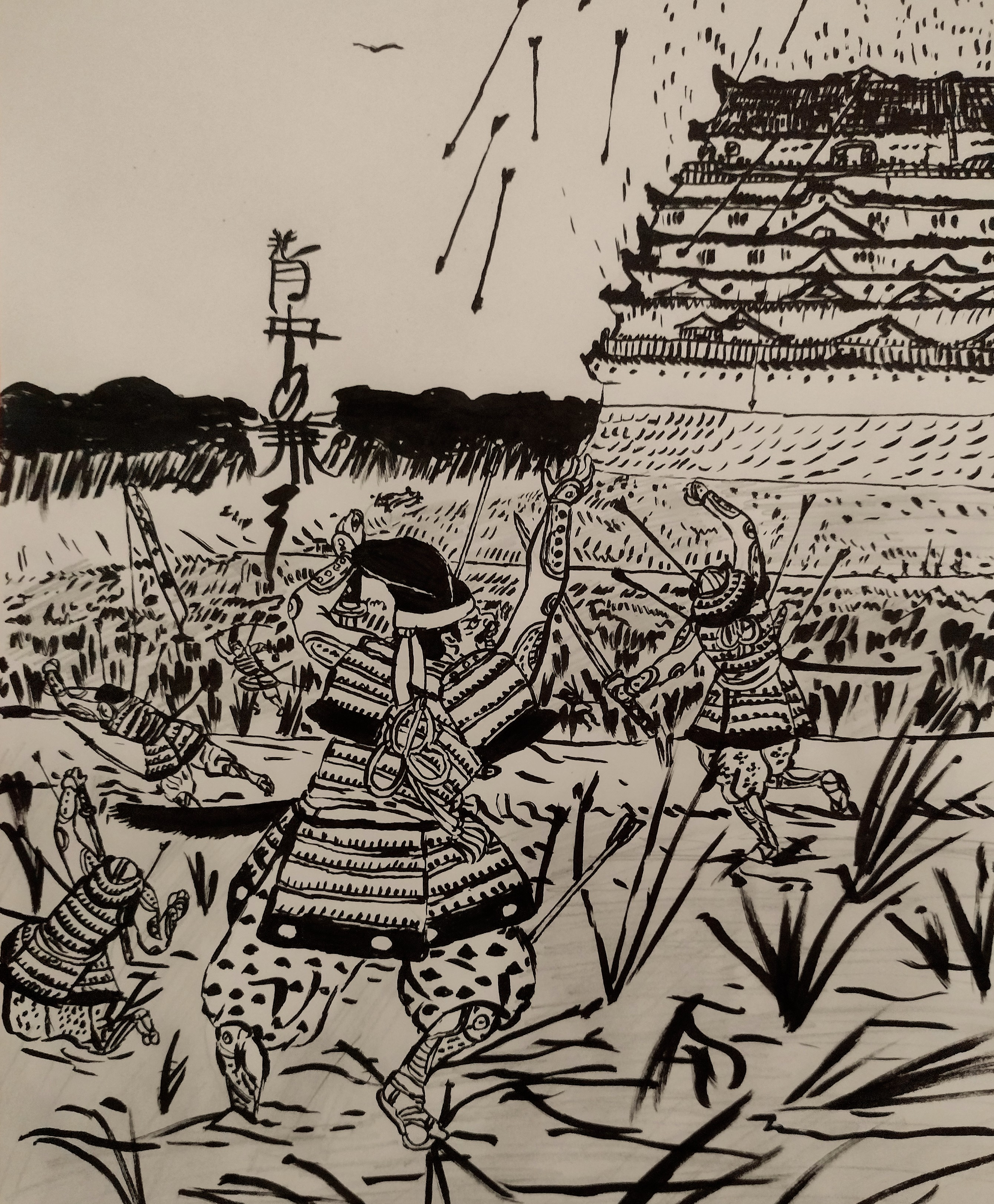
- Death of Seno Kaneyasu
| Date | 1183 |
| Location | Fukuryūji, Okayama Prefecture |
| Result | Minamoto victory |

Belligerents
| Minamoto clan | Taira clan |

Commanders and leaders
| Imai Kanehira | Seno Kaneyasu † |

The siege of Fukuryūji took place in 1183, and was a battle of the Genpei War, the great 12th-century Japanese civil war between the Taira clan and the Minamoto clan. Fukuryūji (福隆寺) was a fortress belonging to Seno Kaneyasu, a Taira partisan. Imai Kanehira led his men across muddy ricefields, under heavy archer fire, to take the fortress. The attackers were victorious, and Kaneyasu was killed.
