= Minamoto no Yukiie =

One of the commanders of the Minamoto forces in the Genpei War

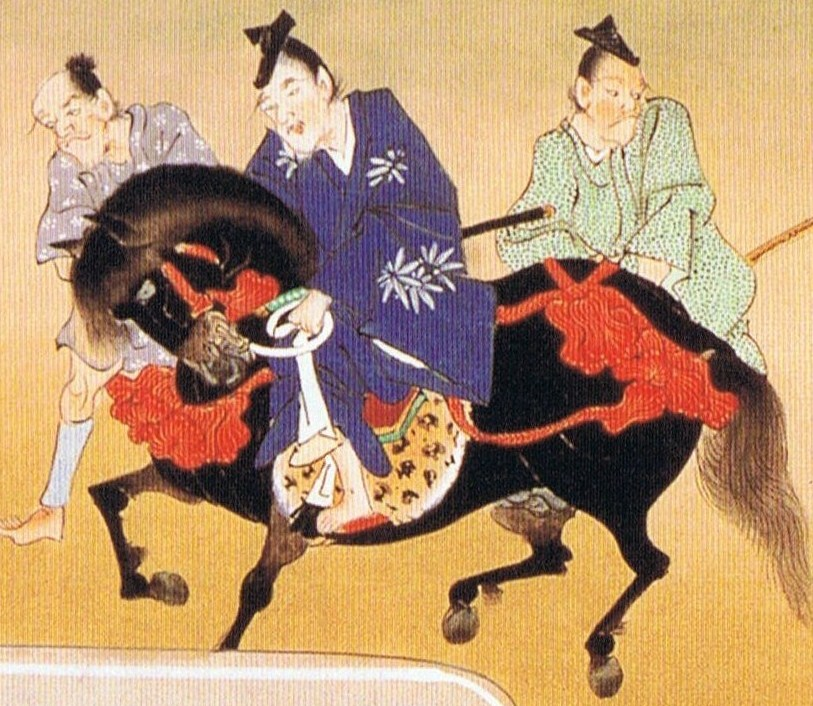
Minamoto no Yukiie

Minamoto no Yukiie (源 行家; died June 1, 1186) was a brother of Minamoto no Yoshitomo, and one of the commanders of the Minamoto forces in the Genpei War at the end of the Heian period of Japanese history.

In 1181, he was defeated at the Battle of Sunomatagawa by Taira no Shigehira. After the humiliation, he fled again to Yahagigawa bridge, where he tried destroying it. However, the Taira caught up and fought back, destroying his forces in the Battle of Yahagigawa. However, the pursuit was called off when the Taira leader, Tomomori, got sick.

Yukiie was then able to join Minamoto no Yoshinaka in besieging the capital city in the summer of 1183. Taira no Munemori was forced to flee with the young emperor while the cloistered Emperor Go-Shirakawa joined Yoshinaka.

For a time, Yukiie plotted with Minamoto no Yoshinaka against Yoritomo, the head of the clan. But when Yoshinaka suggested kidnapping the cloistered Emperor Go-Shirakawa, Yukiie betrayed Yoshinaka, revealing his plan to Go-Shirakawa, who in turn revealed it to Yoritomo.

Yukiie, former Governor of Bizen, then allied himself with Minamoto no Yoshitsune, under imperial orders, against Yoritomo.

Yukiie was captured and killed in 1186, on orders from Yoritomo.
