= Taira no Munemori =

12th-century Japanese military leader

Taira no Munemori (平 宗盛)
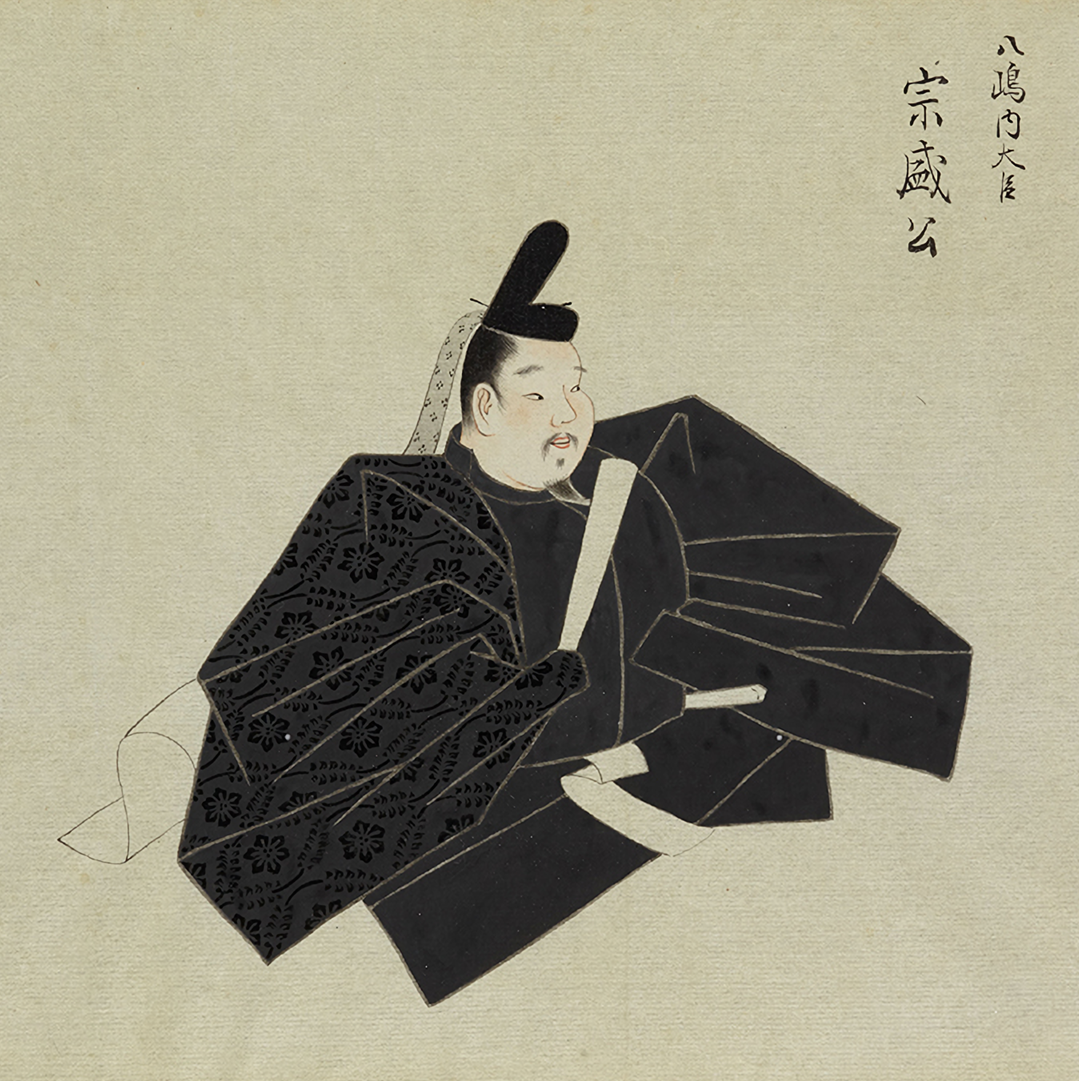
- Born: 1147
- Died: 1185 (aged 37–38)
- Occupation: Military commander

Taira no Munemori (平 宗盛; 1147 – June 19, 1185) was heir to Taira no Kiyomori, and one of the Taira clan's chief commanders in the Genpei War.

As his father Taira no Kiyomori laid on his deathbed, Kiyomori declared, among his last wishes, that all affairs of the clan be placed in Munemori's hands. His eldest son, Shigemori, had already died two years earlier, so Munemori became next in line.

In 1183, the rival Minamoto clan gained power, with Minamoto no Yoshinaka and Minamoto no Yukiie besieging the capital city. Following the defection of Emperor Go-Shirakawa to the Minamoto side, Munemori led his forces in capturing the capital city to the west, along with the young Emperor Antoku. In September that same year, the Taira established a temporary Court in Kyūshū, and then Yashima.

Munemori took part in nearly every battle of the war, including the Battle of Dan-no-ura in 1185, where he was captured and executed a few days later.
