= Battle of Sunomata-gawa =

Battle in 1181 in Japan

- Part of the Genpei War
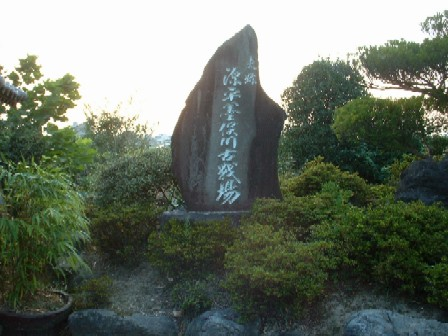
- Monument marking the battle site.
Date	6 August 1181
Location	Sunomata River, Owari Province 35°21′11″N 136°41′02″E
Result	Sneak attack fails; Taira victory

Belligerents
Minamoto clan	Taira clan

Commanders and leaders
Minamoto no Yukiie; Minamoto no Gien †; Asuke Shigenaga †	Taira no Koremori; Taira no Shigehira
- Location within Japan

The Battle of Sunomata-gawa (墨俣川の戦い, Sunomata-gawa no Tatakai) took place in Japan on 6 June 1181 (or by the Japanese calendar, Jishō-5 year, 4-month, 25-day), in the present-day town of Sunomata, Gifu Prefecture. The battle started when Minamoto no Yukiie attempted a sneak attack across the Sunomata River against his enemies during the night. He found Taira no Tomomori and his army directly opposite his, along the Sunomata River, near the borders of Owari and Mino provinces.

The Minamoto warriors waded across, but their ambush failed when the Taira clan could distinguish dry friend from soaking, dripping wet foe, even in the pitch dark of night. Yukiie and a number of other surviving Minamoto were forced back across the river.

After crossing the river, the Minamoto went to the Yahagi River in Mikawa Province, but the Taira chased after them.

== See also ==
- List of Japanese battles
