= Taira no Shigehira =

Taira Clan commanders during the Heian period (1158–1185)

- 平 重衡
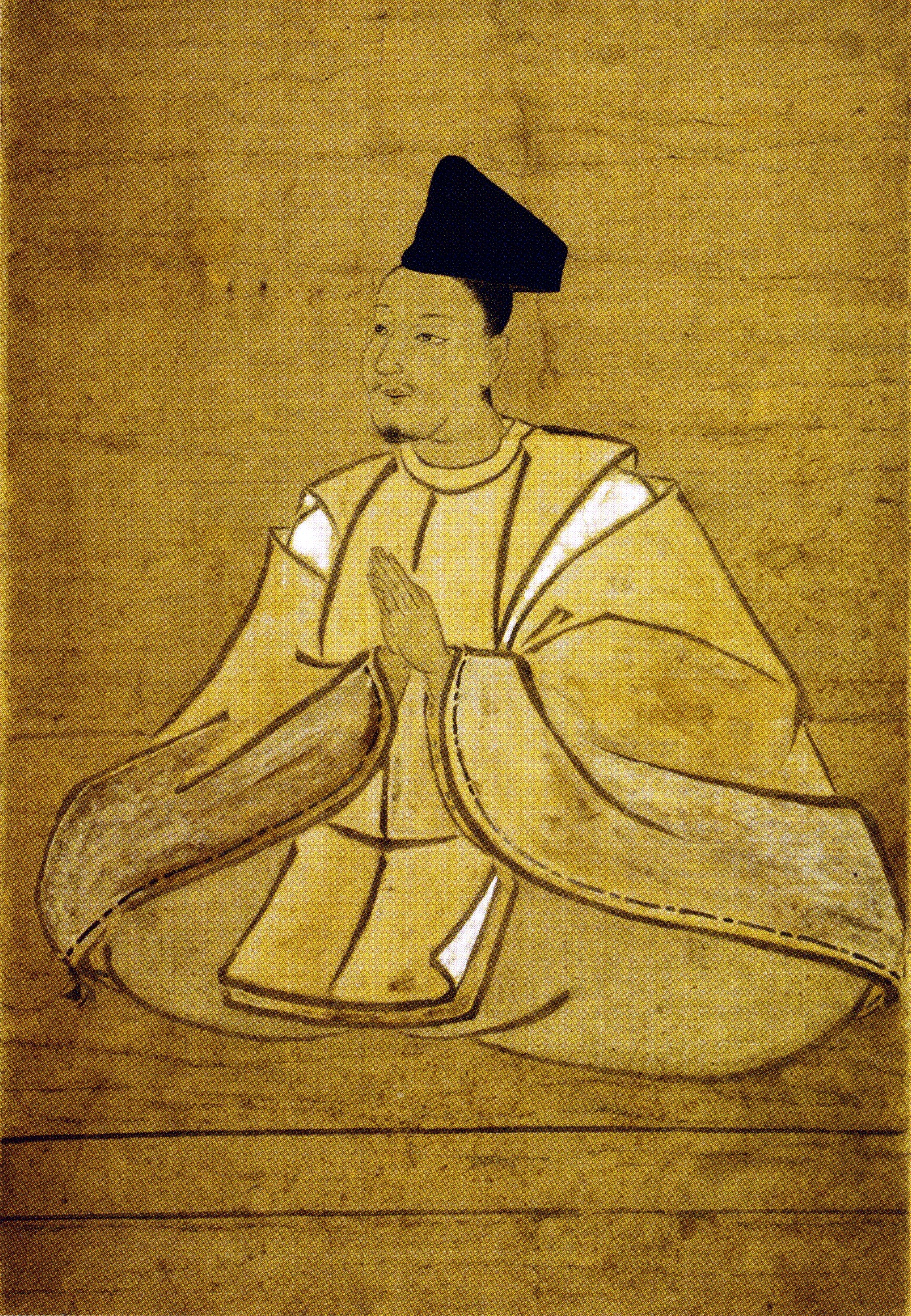
- Born: 1158; Japan
- Died: 1185 (aged 26–27); Japan
- Occupation: Military officer
- Spouse: Fujiwara no Hoshi
- Father: Taira no Kiyomori

Taira no Shigehira (平 重衡) (1158–1185) was one of the sons of Taira no Kiyomori, and one of the Taira Clan's chief commanders during the Heian period of the 12th century of Japan.

== Famous battles ==
Following the Battle of Uji in 1180, Shigehira fought in the Siege of Nara, where he burned the monks of the Tōdai-ji monastery.

Shigehira defeated Minamoto no Yukiie at the Battle of Sunomatagawa in 1181.

He was captured in 1184 at the Battle of Ichi-no-Tani. He was then turned over to the monks of the Tōdai-ji monastery in 1185 and was killed as revenge.

== Family ==
He married Fujiwara no Hoshi (藤原輔子), the second daughter of Dainagon Fujiwara Kunitsuna (藤原邦綱).
