= Minamoto no Yoshinaka =

Japanese samurai lord (1154–1184)

- 源 義仲
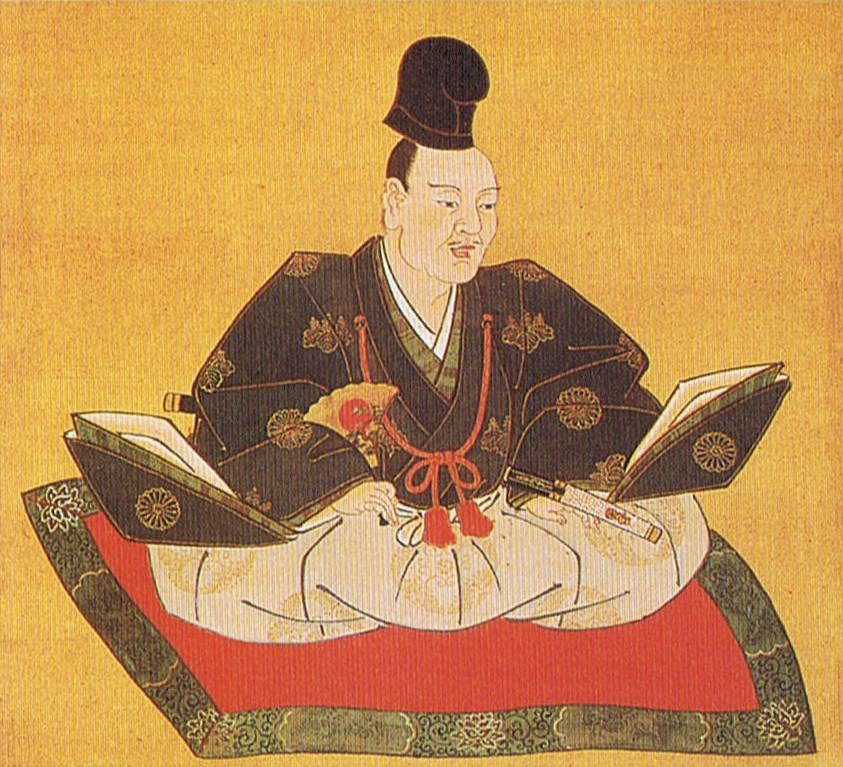
- Born: 1154
- Died: 21 February 1184 (aged 29–30)
- Relatives: Minamoto no Yoshikata (father)
- Military career
- Branch: Minamoto clan

Minamoto no Yoshinaka (源 義仲; Japanese pronunciation: [mʲì.nä́.mó̞.tó̞ nó̞ | jò̞.ɕí.nä̀.kä̀, -nó̞ jó̞-]; 1154 – February 21, 1184), also known as Kiso Yoshinaka (木曾 義仲), was a Japanese samurai lord mentioned in the epic poem The Tale of the Heike. A member of the Minamoto clan, he was a cousin and later rival of shogun Minamoto no Yoritomo during the Genpei War between the Minamoto and the Taira clans in the late Heian period.

== Early life ==
Yoshinaka was born in Musashi Province. His father, Minamoto no Yoshikata, was killed by Minamoto no Yoshihira in 1155. Yoshihira also sought to kill Yoshinaka who escaped to Shinano Province. He was raised by Nakahara no Kanetō, the father of Imai Kanehira, together with his milk-brother Imai Kanehira, who would later become his best friend and most loyal retainer. Yoshinaka later changed his name from Minamoto to Kiso (木曾), to reflect the Kiso Mountains where he was raised.

== Genpei War ==
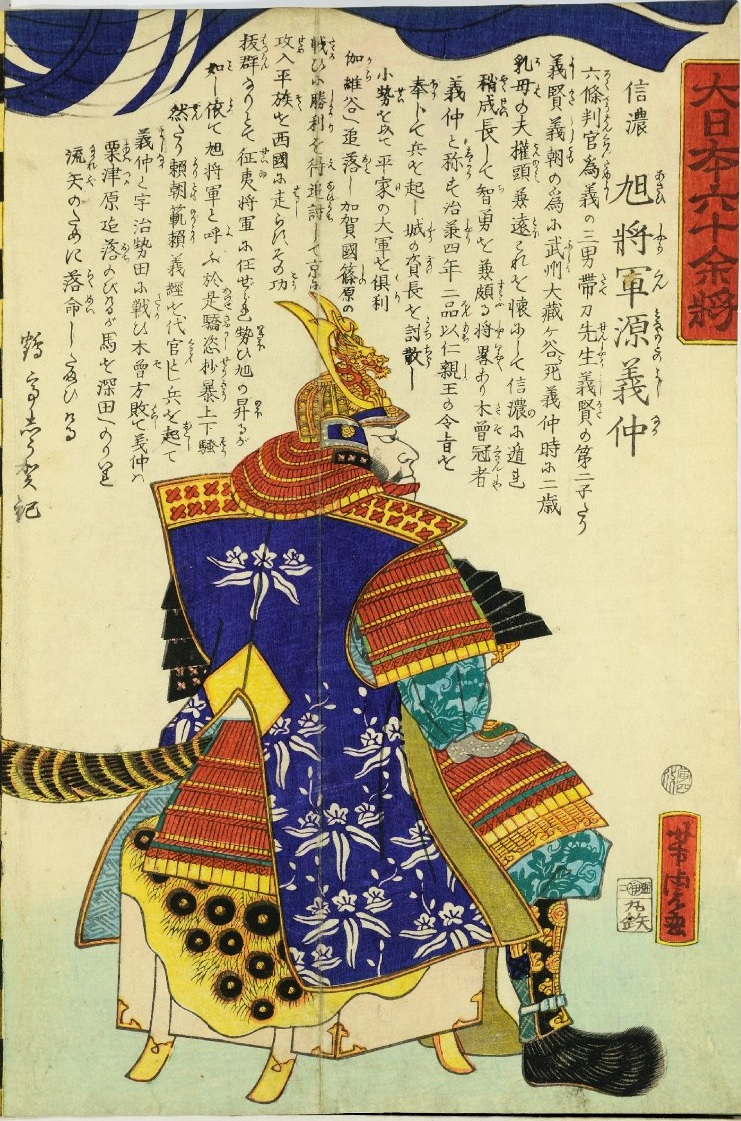
Shinano, Asahishōgun Minamoto no Yoshinaka, from the series Sixty-odd Famous Generals of Japan, woodblock print

Yoshinaka accepted Prince Mochihito's call to the Minamoto clan to rise against the Taira in 1181. He entered the Genpei War by raising an army and invading Echigo Province. He then defeated a Taira force sent to pacify the area.

The Taira army captured the fortress of Hiuchi in 1183. Yoshinaka later that year was confronted by his cousin, Minamoto no Yoritomo, whose army had entered Shinano. They reconciled and resolved to unite against the Taira. Yoshinaka to seal the agreement sent his son Yoshitaka (or Yoshimoto) to Kamakura as a hostage. However, having been shamed by the process, Yoshinaka was now determined to beat Yoritomo to Kyoto, defeat the Taira on his own, and take control of the Minamoto clan.

Yoshinaka defeated the army of Taira no Koremori at the Battle of Kurikara Pass and marched to Kyoto. The Taira retreated out of the capital, taking the child Emperor Antoku with them. Yoshinaka's army entered the capital with the cloistered Emperor Go-Shirakawa who issued a mandate for Yoshinaka to join with Yukiiye in "destroying Munemori and his army". The emperor also bestowed upon Yoshinaka the title of Asahi Shōgun (旭将軍).

Yoshinaka plotted with Yukiie in "setting up a government in their own northern province". Learning Go-Shirakawa had sought help from his cousin Yoritomo, Yoshinaka seized the cloistered emperor and burned his palace. Yoritomo ordered his brothers Yoshitsune and Noriyori to destroy Yoshinaka.

He was subsequently driven out of Kyoto and killed by his cousins at the Battle of Awazu in Ōmi Province (present-day Shiga Prefecture) along with Kanehira. With night coming and with many enemy soldiers chasing him, he attempted to find an isolated spot to kill himself. However, the story says that his horse became trapped in a field of partly frozen mud and his enemies were able to approach him and kill him.

== Legacy ==
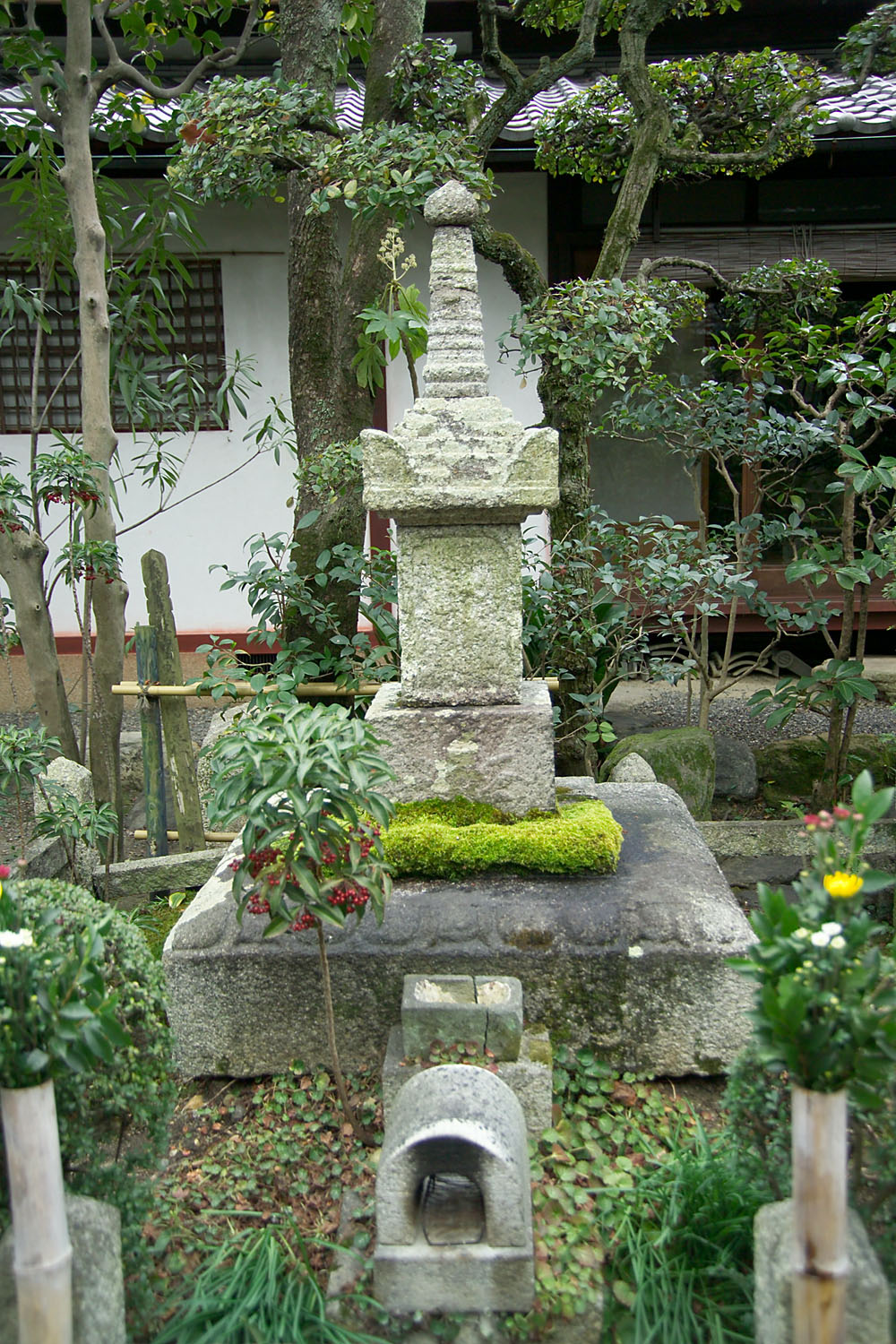
Grave of Yoshinaka (Gichū-ji, Ōtsu, Shiga Prefecture)

Yoshinaka was buried in Ōtsu, in Ōmi; a temple was built in his honor during the later Muromachi period. Its name, Gichū-ji, has the same two kanji as his given name. Kanehira's grave is also in Otsu, but it is not close to Yoshinaka's. The Edo period poet Matsuo Bashō, pursuant to his last wishes, was buried next to Minamoto no Yoshinaka in Gichū-ji.

Minamoto no Yoshinaka is one of many main characters in the Kamakura period epic, the Tale of Heike. The story of Yoshinaka and Kanehira is fairly well known in Japan; it is also the subject of the Noh play Kanehira, in which Kanehira's tormented ghost describes his and Yoshinaka's death, and his wish to go to the other side.

== See also ==
- Imai Kanehira
- Battle of Hojuji
