= Taira (disambiguation) =

The Taira clan was a major Japanese clan of samurai.

Taira may also refer to:

== People with the surname ==
- Afonso Taira, Portuguese footballer
- Airi Taira (平 愛梨; born 1984), Japanese actress
- Taira no Atsumori (平 敦盛; 1169–1184), Japanese samurai
- Akira Taira (born 1994), Argentine footballer who plays as a defender
- Taira no Chikazane (平 親真; 1178-1225), the last living member of the Taira clan
- Choji Taira (平良 朝治; born 1960), Japanese weightlifter
- Hibiki Taira (平 良響; born 2000), Japanese racing driver
- Taira no Kagekiyo (平 景清; died 1196), Japanese samurai of the Taira clan
- Kaima Taira (平良 海馬; born 1999), Japanese baseball player
- Taira no Kanemori (平 兼盛; ? –991), waka poet and Japanese nobleman
- Kentarō Taira (平良 拳太郎; born 1995), Japanese baseball player
- Taira no Kiyomori (平 清盛; 1118–1181), Japanese military leader and kugyō
- Kōichi Taira (平良 幸市; 1909–1982), Japanese politician
- Koji Taira (平 浩二; born 1983), Japanese rugby union player
- Taira no Koremori (平 維盛; 1158–1184), one of the Taira clan's commanders and military lord
- Linda Taira, American journalist and consultant from Hawai
- Masaaki Taira (平 将明; born 1967), Japanese politician
- Masaji Taira (平良 正次; born 1952), Gojū Ryū practitioner
- Taira no Masakado (平 将門; died 940), Heian period provincial magnate and samurai
- Taira no Munemori (平 宗盛; 1147–1185), Taira clan's chief commanders in the Genpei War
- Nancy Taira, Mexican actress
- Taira no Norimori (平 教盛; 1128–1185), Japanese commander during the Genpei War
- Taira no Noritsune (平 教経; 1160–1185), Japanese military leader of the late Heian period of Japan
- Robert Taira, (1923–2003) the founder of King's Hawaiian bakery
- Taira no Sadamori (平 貞盛; 10th century), Japanese samurai of the Taira clan
- Taira no Sadayoshi (平 貞能), Japanese governor and samurai commander
- Satoshi Taira (平 聡; born 1970), Japanese football player
- Taira no Shigehira (平 重盛; 1158–1185), the Taira Clan's chief commanders
- Taira no Shigemori (平 重衡; 1138–1179), the eldest regent of the Taira clan patriarch, Taira no Kiyomori
- Taira Shinken (平 信賢, Taira Shinken; 1897–1970) was a Japanese martial artist
- Susumu Taira (平良進; 1934–2024), Japanese actor
- Taira no Tadamori (平 忠盛; 1096–1153), the head of the Taira clan
- Taira no Tadanori (平 忠度; 1144–1184), Japanese poet and military leader
- Taira no Tadatsune (平 忠常; 975?-1031), Japanese samurai lord and gōzoku
- Taira no Takakiyo (平 高清; 1173–1199), a member of the ruling Taira clan
- Taira no Takamochi (平 高望), a former member of the Imperial Family demoted to nobility of the Heian period
- Takunori Taira, Japanese engineer
- Tatsuro Taira (平良 達郎; born 2000), Japanese professional mixed martial artist
- Taira no Tokiko (平 時子; 1126–1185), Japanese aristocrat from the Heian period
- Taira no Tokuko (平 徳子; 1155–1214), Empress consort of Emperor Takakura
- Tomi Taira (平良 とみ; 1928–2015), Japanese actress
- Taira no Tomomori (平 知盛; 1152–1185), one of the Taira Clan's chief commanders in the Genpei War
- Toshiko Taira (平良 敏子; 1921–2022), Japanese textile artist
- Taira no Tsunemori (平 經盛; 1124–1185), the 3rd son of Taira no Tadamori and a younger half-brother of Taira no Kiyomori
- Yoshie Taira (平 淑恵; born 1954), Japanese actress
- Taira no Yoshifumi (平 良文), Japanese samurai and military lord
- Yoshihisa Taira, composer
- Yuna Taira (平 祐奈; born 1998), Japanese actress
- José Taira (born 1968), Portuguese former footballer

== People with the given name or nickname ==
- Taira Fujita (藤田 平; born 1947), Japanese former infielder
- Taira Hara (はら たいら; 1943–2006), Japanese manga artist and tarento
- Taira Honda (本田 平; 1932–1975), Japanese mathematician
- Taira Imata (井俣 太良; born 1975), Japanese actor
- Taira Inoue (平 井上; born 1983), Japanese footballer
- Taira Shige (茂 平; born 1993), Japanese football player
- Yuliia "Taira" Paievska (born 1968) Ukrainian medic
- Taira Uematsu (born 1983), Japanese coach for the San Francisco Giants of Major League Baseball

== Places ==
- Taira, the center of Iwaki, Fukushima, Japan
- Taira Dam (平ダム) a dam in the Nagano Prefecture, Japan
- Taira Station (多比良駅) a passenger railway station
- Taira Ski Area (たいらスキー場) a skiing venue located in Nanto
- Taira, Toyama, a village in Toyama prefecture, Japan

== Other uses ==
- Taira (spider), a genus of spiders

== See also ==
- Tayra (Eira barbara), a neotropical Mustelidae
- Tiara (disambiguation)
