= Tiara (disambiguation) =

A tiara is a form of crown.

Tiara may also refer to:

== Arts and music ==
- Tiara (album), by Seventh Wonder
- "Tiara" (poem), by Mark Doty
- A song by Eric Carr from the 1999 album Rockology
- Tears to Tiara, a video games and anime
- T-ara, South Korean girl group

== Machines ==
- HMS Tiara (P351), British submarine
- Tiara Yachts, US-based boat manufacturer
- Tiara Air, Aruba-based airline
- Continental Tiara series of aircraft engines
- A name used in some markets for the Toyota Corona's T20 and T30 series sedan models
- Proton Tiara, Malaysian car

== Other ==
- TIARA (database), genomics database
- Tiara Records, US-based record label

== People with the name Tiara ==
- Tiara Andini (born 2001), Indonesian singer
- Tiara Auxier, American politician
- Tiara Jacquelina (born 1967), Malaysian actress
- Tiara Malcom (born 1983), American college basketball coach
- Tiara Rosalia Nuraidah (born 1993), Indonesian badminton player
- Tiara Andini Prastika (born 1996), Indonesian cyclist
- Tiara Purifoy, participant in American Idol (season 3)
- Tiara Brown (born 1988), American boxer
- Tiara Thomas (born 1989), American singer

=== Fictional character ===
- Lady Tiara, a character from the OVA series Shamanic Princess
- Tiara from Lapis Re:LiGHTs
- Tiara Royal Ivy from The Most Heretical Last Boss Queen
- Tiara Basori, a character from Makeine
- Blessed Tiara from the video game Meremanoid
- Tiara, a character from the video game Super Mario Odyssey

== See also ==
- Taira (disambiguation)
- Tierra (disambiguation)
