= Siege of Hiuchi =

Siege in 1183 in Japan

- Part of the Genpei War
Date	April–May 1183
Location	Hiuchiyama, Echizen Province
Result	Siege succeeds; fortress falls, but Minamoto survive and escape

Belligerents
Minamoto clan	Taira clan

Commanders and leaders
Minamoto no Yoshinaka	Taira no Koremori

Hiuchiyama (火打ち山) was one of Minamoto no Yoshinaka's fortresses in Echizen Province, Japan. In April and May 1183, a Taira force led by Taira no Koremori attacked the fortress.

It was built on rocky crags, and well-defended; the Minamoto had even built a dam to create a moat. However, a traitor within the fortress tied a message to an arrow, firing it into the Taira camp, and revealing a way to breach the dam and drain the water. The castle soon fell to the Taira, but Yoshinaka and much of his forces survived and escaped.
