= Portuguese sweet bread =

Various Portuguese sweet breads

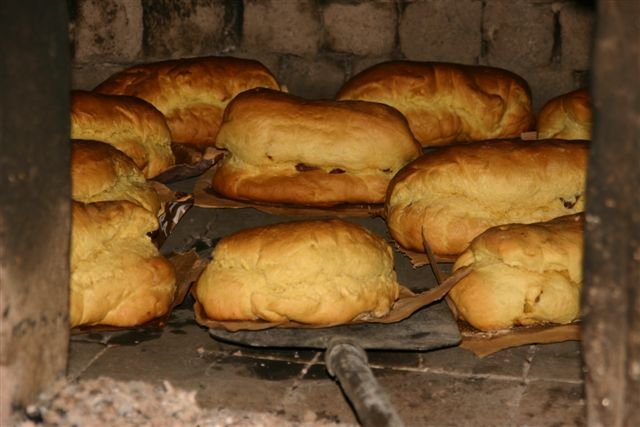
- Loaves of folar de Chaves baking in a forno
- Type: Sweet bread
- Place of origin: Portugal
- Main ingredients: Flour, milk, sugar, eggs, yeast, sea salt, butter or olive oil
- Ingredients generally used: Cinnamon, lemon zest, port
- Variations: Pão doce, arrufadas, folares, massa sovada, bolos, fogaça, regueifa
- Similar dishes: Easter bread, challah, Hawaiian rolls/bread, vada pav

Portuguese sweet bread refers to a group of enriched sweet breads or yeasted cakes originating from Portugal. (Note: Enriched breads and yeasted cakes are typically soft, sweet, yeasty, breadlike containing higher amounts of sugar, fats such as butter and oil (including eggs and milk), or flavorings such as cinnamon and lemon, whereas lean breads only contain flour, salt, water and yeast and are hard and crusty. Instead of yeast, cakes like Pão-de-ló rely on egg whites to "lighten" the cake batter, while American pancakes require baking soda (or powder).) Historically, these sweet breads were generally reserved for festive occasions such as Easter or Pentecost and were typically given as gifts. However, in contemporary times, many varieties are made and consumed year round. Outside of Portugal, Portuguese "sweet bread" translated as "pão doce" is often associated with Azorean "massa sovada" which are similar but traditionally prepared differently.

== History ==
The pão doce is of Spanish origin derived from a Renaissance era sponge cake known as pão-de-ló. In French cuisine, it would later be known as génoise, after the city of Genoa, and in Italy pan di spagna (lit. 'Spanish bread'). The Portuguese would further develop this cake into what is now known today as pão doce.

Many traditional Portuguese sweet breads are defined by the associated region or by the convents, artisan bakers or religious confraternities (similar to a guild) that historically made them. Since many have deep historical and cultural significance to the area which they originate from, these breads are as well as other foods and ingredients are inventoried by the Portuguese governmental office Directorate-General for Agriculture and Rural Development (DGARD), which collaborates with a collective of independent confraternities known as the Portuguese Federation of Gastronomic Confraternities (FPCG) throughout Portugal.

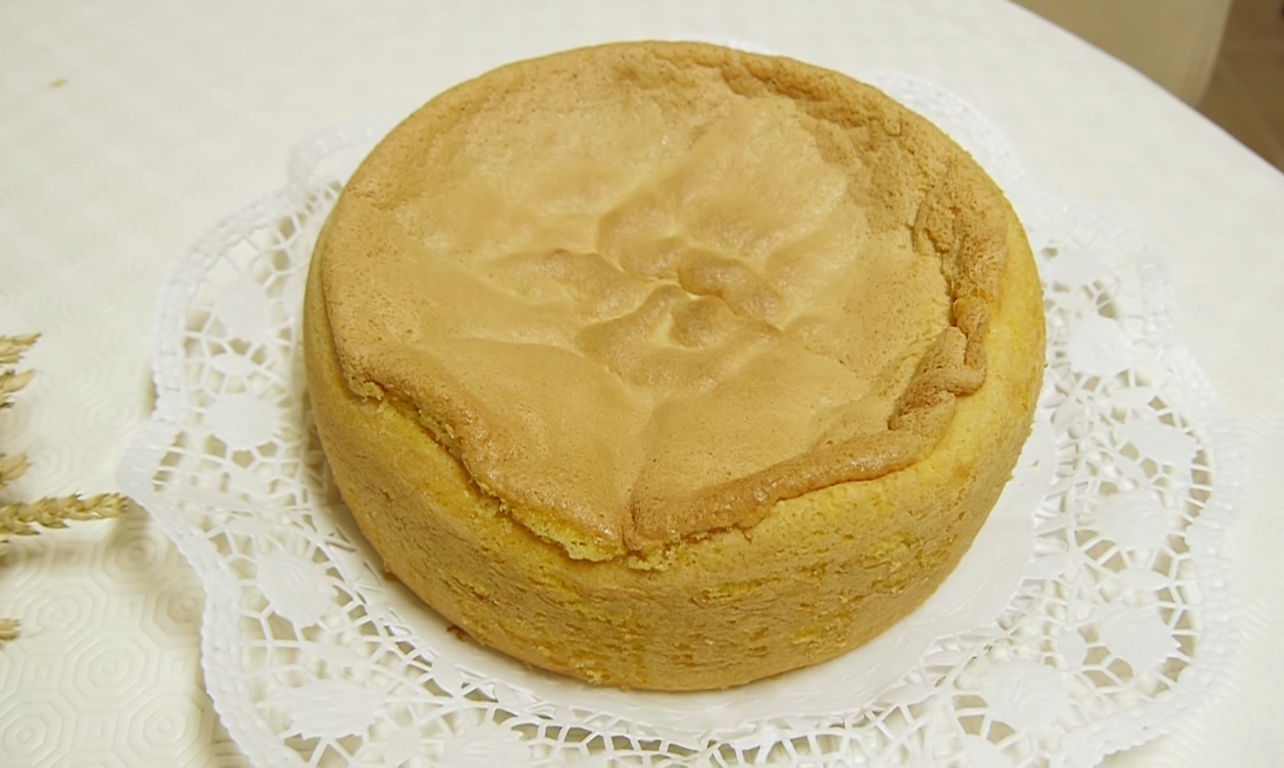
Pão doce evolved as a yeasted cake variation of the Pão de Ló, a type of sponge cake that relies on beaten eggs.

There are currently ninety-three confraternities that specializes in various gastronomies varying from specific dishes or ingredients to a particular region of Portugal. As an example, the Confraria Gastronómica As Sainhas de Vagos was given the responsibility of defining pão doce from Vagos, while the similar pão doce das-24-horas from the same region is defined by the "Directorate-General for Regional Development" (DGRD), while massa sovada from the Azores is defined by the Federação Portuguesa das Confrarias Gastronómicas.

== Variations ==
- Arrufada (wikt:arrufada) originates from Coimbra which were once made by nuns of the Santa Clara convent. Historically, this bread was enriched with surplus egg yolks left over from wine clarification. The bread is also enriched with milk, butter, sugar and sometimes cinnamon. The nuns would later incorporate coconut as an exotic ingredient brought back from Asia during Portuguese exploration. It is also known as pão de Deus or estaladinho. It was typically given to the poor on All Saints Day, typically by children as a tradition called Pão-por-Deus (lit. 'bread for God').
- Bola doce Mirandesa (lit. 'sweet Mirandesa ball') is an artisanal yeast cake from Miranda do Douro similar to folar. It is enriched with eggs, butter and olive oil, and flavored with cinnamon. The dough is rolled out into a thin sheet and sprinkled with sugar and cinnamon. Unlike a cinnamon roll, it is layered like a cake with 6 to 7 layers before being baked.
- Bolo das Alhadas is an artisanal yeast cake from Figueira da Foz created by the baker Leonor das Alhadas. It is enriched with sugar, eggs, lemon, butter, and cinnamon.

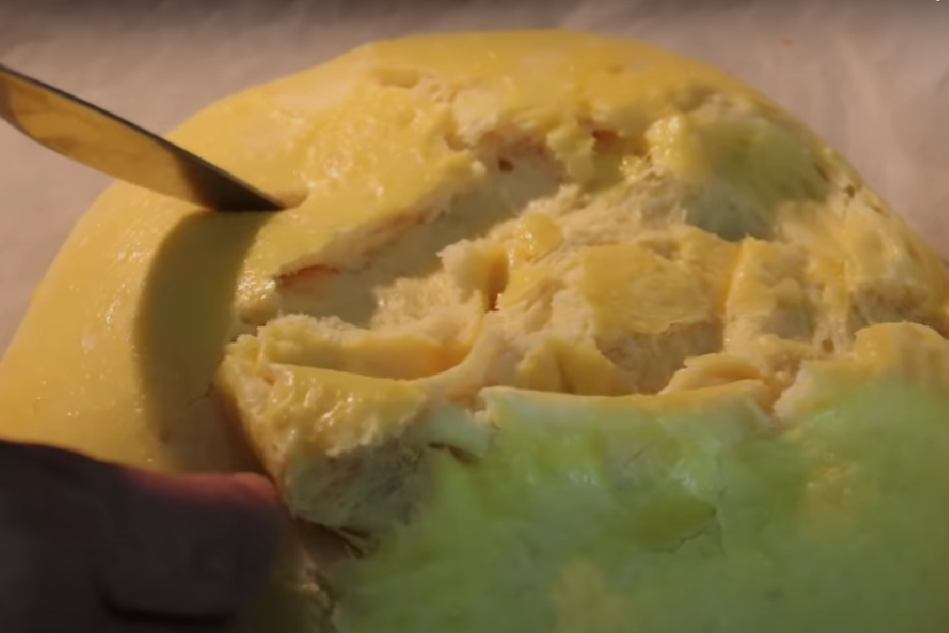
Scoring the bolo de Ançã in the middle of baking

- Bolo de Ançã is a mildly sweet artisanal yeast cake enriched with eggs, butter, and scented with lemon zest. Halfway through baking, the bread is scored with a knife creating small pointed ridges on the top.
- Bolo de Faca (lit. 'knife cake') is a large yeast cake from Algarve which incorporates margarine, lard, olive oil, eggs, walnuts (or almonds), lemon zest, cinnamon and fennel.
- Bolo de S. Nicolau (lit. 'St. Nicholas Cake') from Santa Maria da Feira is a yeasted cake enriched with eggs, sugar, butter, and milk and flavored with cinnamon and port wine. The loaf is braided and sprinkled with chopped almonds.
- Bolo Podre are mildly sweet, yeasted cakes from Castro Daire. It contains eggs, olive oil, butter, lard, and cinnamon. The dough takes 3 to 4 hours to rise, giving the name "rotten cake".
- Bolo Lêvedo (lit. 'yeast cake') is a sweet sourdough muffin found in the Azores. It resembles a large English muffin but is much sweeter and chewier. This bread incorporates milk, eggs, and butter. Some recipes include lemon zest or cinnamon. This bread was traditionally grilled on a stone tile with a wood fire beneath it.
- Bolo de Vesperas from the Azores is a yeasted cake using barley, lard, and butter prepared for Festa do Divino, a festival celebrating Pentecost. It is traditionally stamped with a symbols of the Cult of the Holy Ghost six times before baking, leaving dimples on the loaves after baking. Regular wheat flour can be used when barley flour is not available.

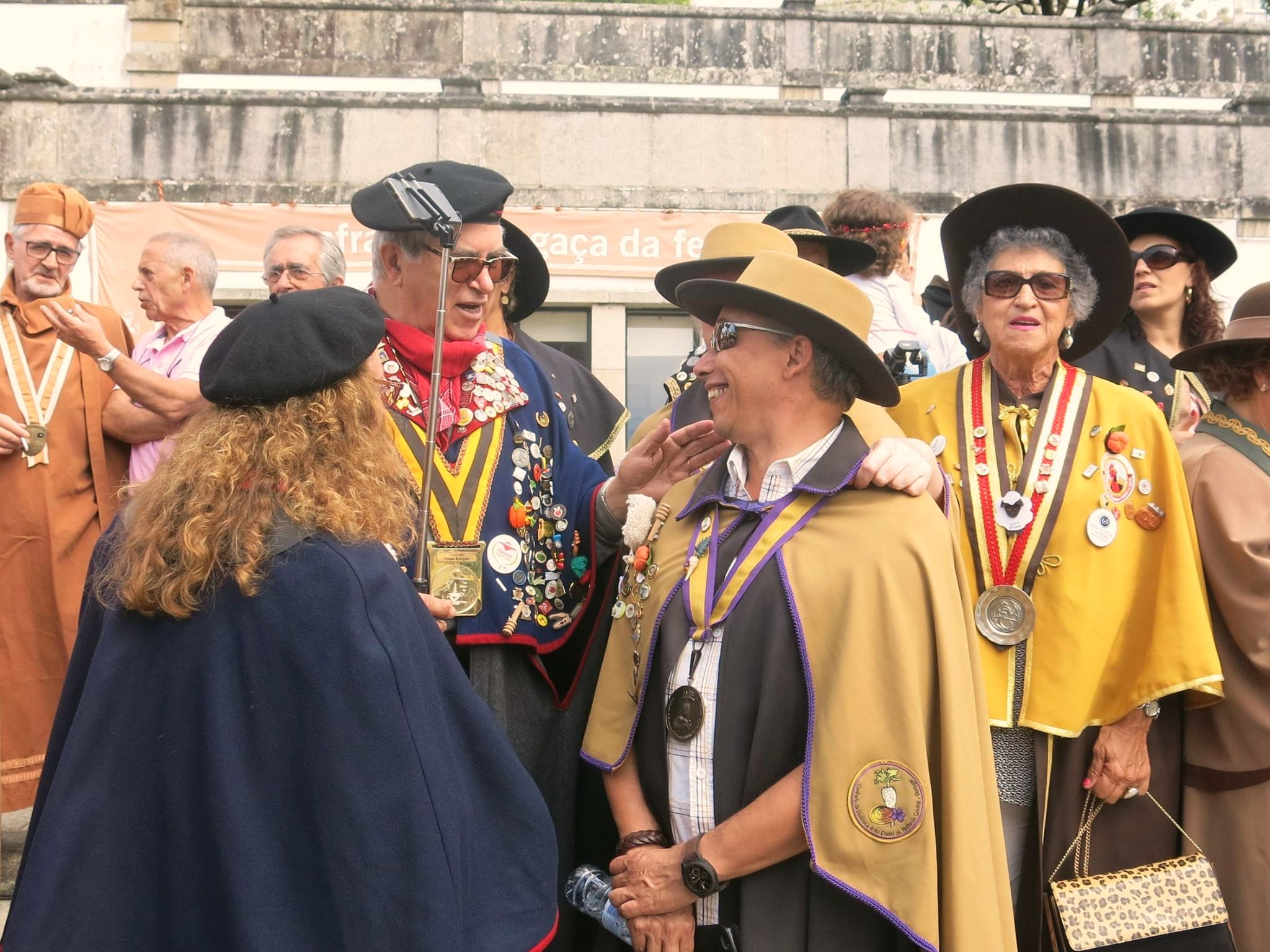
Members of several confraternities meeting during a festival in Santa Maria da Feira dressed in their distinct cloaks and headwear.

- Bolo Rei (lit. 'king's cake') is a yeasted cake typically served on the Feast of the Three Kings, otherwise known as Epiphany. It is a ring-shaped bread that is mixed with candied fruits resembling gemstones on a golden crown, the nuts for myrrh, while the sweet aroma of cinnamon or port mimic the scent of frankincense, representing the gifts of the Three Magi to the baby Jesus. The recipe was imported to Portugal around 1869 by the French, known as gateau des roi. Like its French counterpart, charms are customarily incorporated into the dough as prizes for the finder, while a dried fava bean representing the baby Jesus, signified the person who would pay for the next cake. A bolo rainha (lit. 'queen's cake') is a modern, alternative yeasted cake that omits the candied fruits. Rather, it is filled generously with nuts such as pine nuts, hazelnuts, walnuts, or almonds, and sometimes raisins. Other modern versions include chocolate and walnuts.
- Broa Mimosa do Boco from Vagos is a yeasted broa, a bread that include cornmeal in addition to wheat flour. This bread is enriched with eggs, brown sugar, flavored with cinnamon and lemon peel.
- Esquecidos da Guarda (lit. 'the forgotten ones of Guarda') from the Central Region is a sweet bread that resembles a large cookie. It is simply made with just flour, eggs, sugar, salt and yeast.
- Fogaça da Feira is from Santa Maria da Feira. This castle-shaped bread includes eggs, sugar, butter, lemons, and cinnamon. When the area was hit by a plague in 1505, the townspeople prayed to Saint Sebastian and made an offering by presenting in his honor this sweet bread. A festival is now celebrated every January 20th to commemorate the saint.

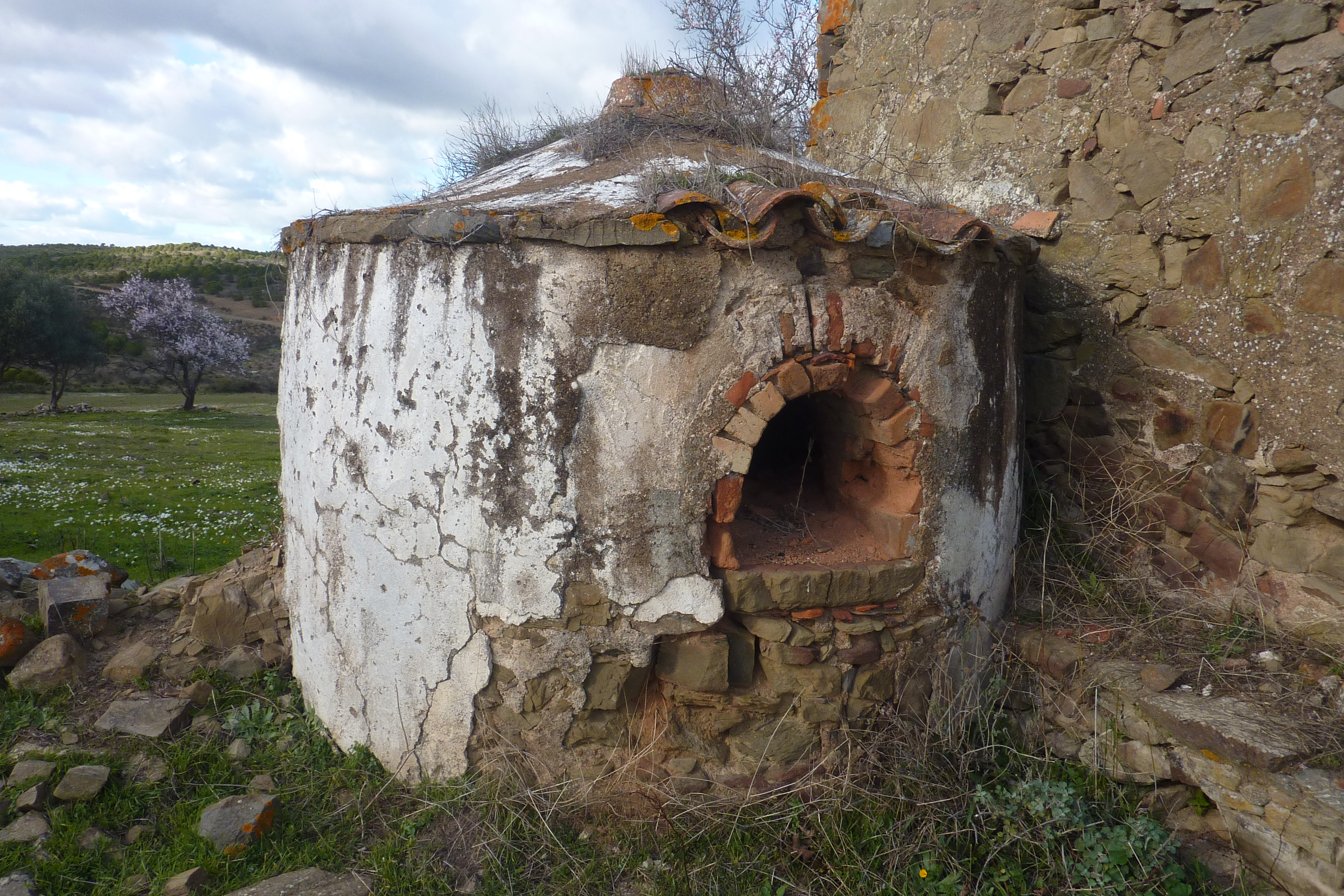
A bread oven in Algarve

- Folar is a popular Easter bread enriched with eggs, sugar, milk and butter and often scented with aniseed, fennel seed, or cinnamon. The folar may have been influenced by the Marranos, ethnic Sephardic Jews. A variation of the Purim dish bourekas, which was also known as huevos de Haman or foulares, was a hard-boiled egg wrapped in dough (like a foulard) representing Haman in a jail cell. However in Alentejo, they are sometimes shaped like animals. There are folares stuffed with meats, such as the ones from Chaves, Valpaços and Trás-os-Montes.
  - Folar da Páscoa vary by region, many contain hard boiled eggs, held in place by a cross of bread dough alluding to the festivities surrounding Easter. Godparents traditionally gave each of their godchildren one of these cakes.
  - Folar de Vale de Ílhavo are scented with cinnamon. The eggs are dyed by boiling the eggs with onion skin.
  - In Centro and Beiras, folares are sweet and commonly scented with cinnamon or fennel, which wraps a painted egg.
  - Folar de Vouzela is enriched with a fair amount of butter and egg. Once the dough is prepared, it is filled with additional butter and sugar then shaped into a horseshoe then sprinkled with more sugar. These folares were traditionally given to godparents by their godchildren.
  - Folar de Olhão of the Algarve region is layered akin to monkey bread and is made with a combination of orange juice, butter, and Aguardente, port, brandy, or rum and topped with a combination of butter, honey, orange peel, cinnamon, and brown sugar.
- Massa Sovada (lit. 'kneaded dough') is typically round loaves that are enriched with butter, eggs, milk, and sugar from the Azores traditionally eaten at Easter and on the Feast of the Holy Spirit. It is sometimes flavored with fennel or lemon zest. Sweet potato is traditionally used to activate the yeast. Massa sovada is often paired with arroz doce. It is also prepared for weddings, christenings, and anniversaries.
- Pão doce (lit. 'sweet bread') is a sweet bread from the Central Region that traditionally required additional steps. An initial dough made of flour, yeast, butter, and salt was prepared. After resting, it is mixed with egg whites, olive oil (or butter), and lemon zest (or cinnamon) then baked after resting for twenty-four hours. It has a crust characteristic of wood oven bread since loaves were often baked upside down in order to develop a crescent-shaped split or crack. Historically, because of its ingredients and laborious preparation, it was expensive and made only for festive occasions although it is now made throughout the year.
- Pão doce das 24-horas from the Centro is a sweet bread enriched with eggs, olive oil and lard. The dough is rolled out and folded in half to create an elongated loaf.
- Pão de Leite (lit. 'milk bread') is a non-traditional bread made with milk and is slightly sweet similar to Japanese milk bread. It is a favorite of children because it is fluffy and soft.

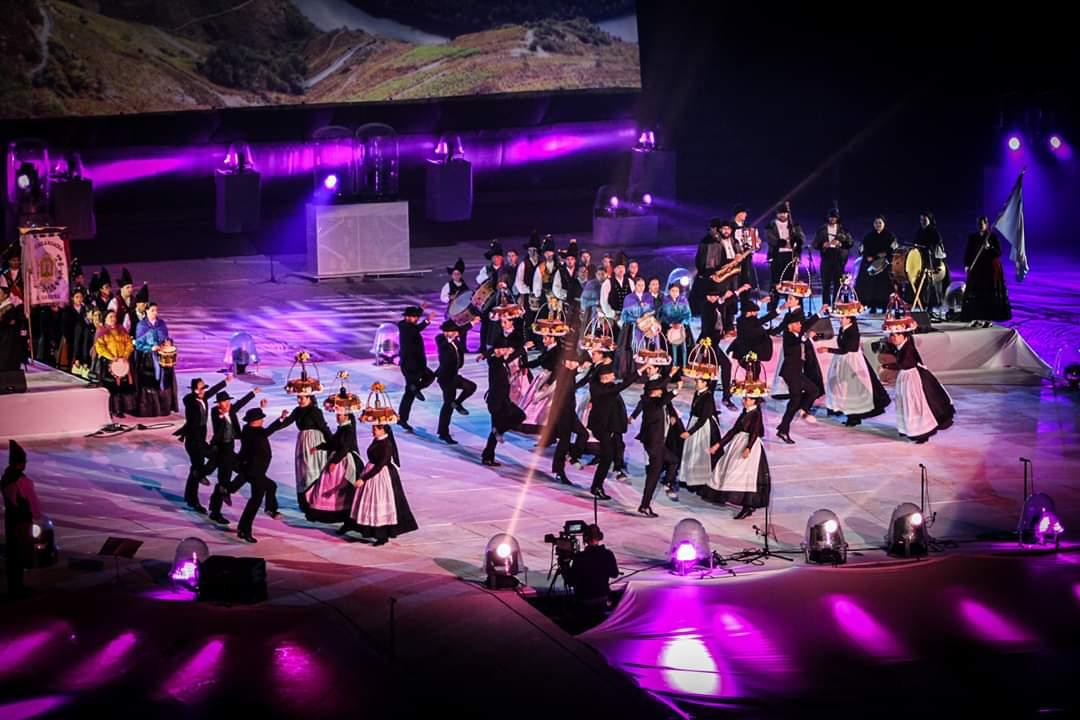
Regueifa dance, brides with a loaf of bread on their heads.

- Regueifa (wikt:regueifa) is traditionally a large round loaf with a hole enriched with eggs and sugar, and flavored with cinnamon and port wine, once given away as a prize. As such, it is now made exclusively for weddings, with an associated wedding dance ritual.
- Regueifa da Pascoa (lit. 'Easter 'brioche'') from Santa Maria da Feira is enriched with eggs, butter, and milk and flavored with cinnamon and port wine. The dough is braided and formed into a round loaf with a hole in the center.
- Viriato is named after the Lusitanian leader, Viriathus. It is a sweet bread from Viseu filled with an egg custard mixed with shredded coconut, and shaped into a "V". It was created in the 1940s by Delfim de Sousa.

== Outside of Portugal ==
Portuguese sweet breads are common in areas with a large Portuguese diaspora population, such as New England, northern New Jersey, southern Florida, California, Ontario, and Toronto. They are also found in other former colonies including Brazil, Macau, India, Angola, Cape Verde, Guinea-Bissau, Mozambique, São Tomé and Príncipe, and the island of Timor.

Bolos lêvedos are popular in the Cape Cod area with a large Portuguese population, including Rhode Island where they are sometimes known as "Portuguese muffins" or "pops". They are eaten for breakfast with butter and jam or used for sandwiches.

=== Hawaiian sweet bread ===
Massa sovada was brought to Hawaii by Portuguese immigrants from the Azores in the late 1800s and has since been adapted into Hawaiian cuisine. It was frequently called "stone bread" because of its habit of turning hard as a rock within one day of baking. Robert Taira of King's Hawaiian tweaked the recipe to manufacture a mass-produced shelf-stable product known as "Hawaiian rolls".

== Gallery ==
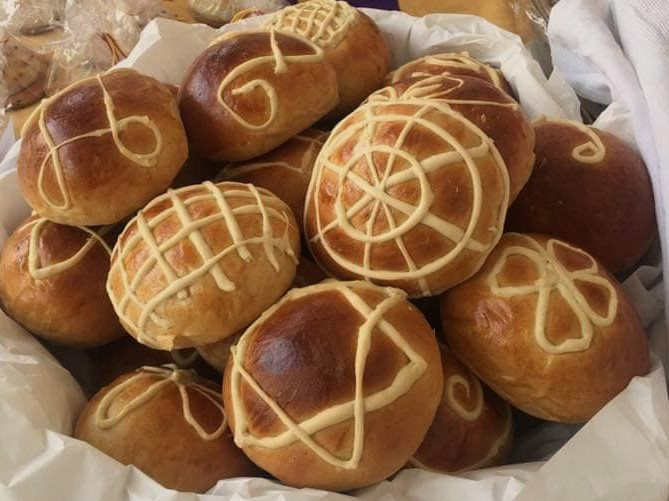
Arrufadas de Coimbra

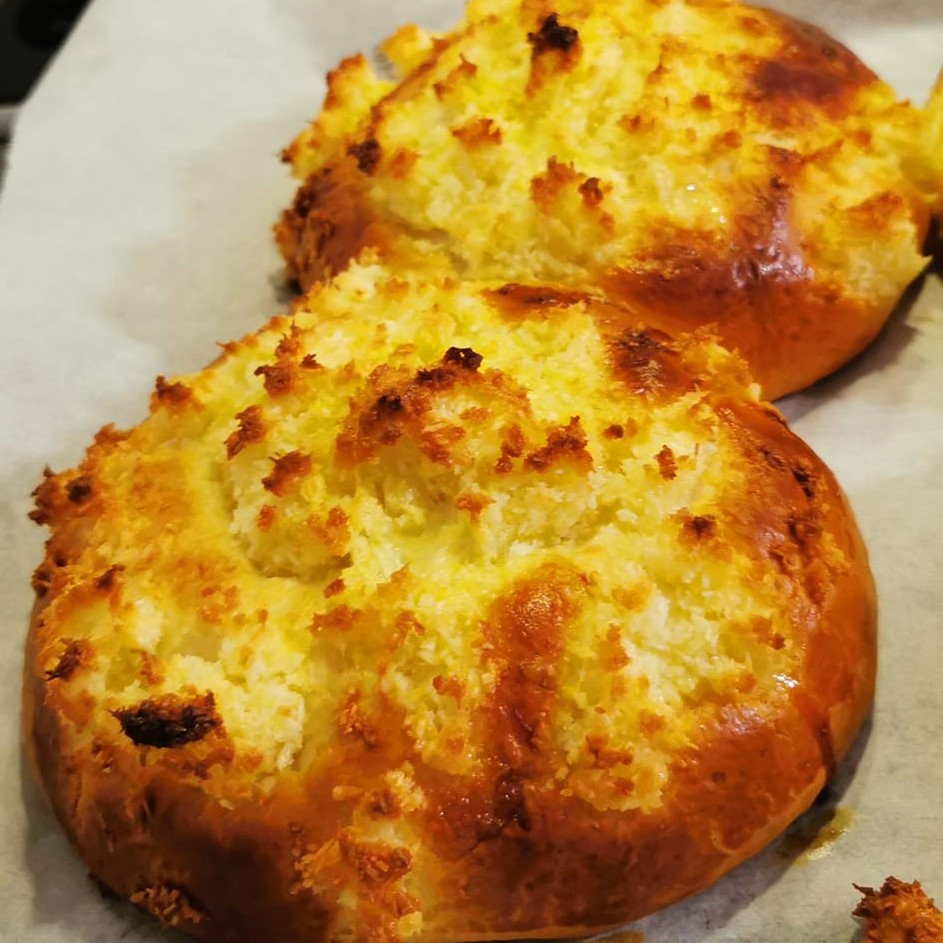
Arrufada, pão de Deus

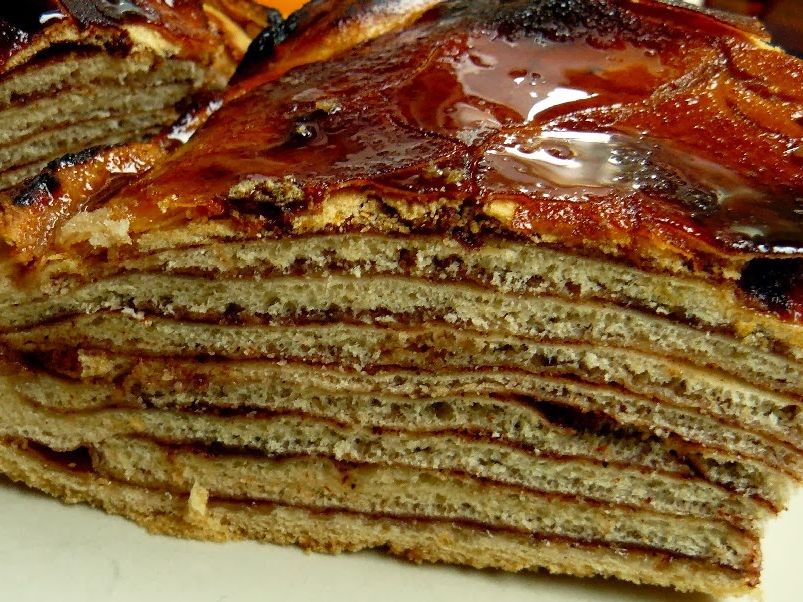
Bola Doce Mirandesa

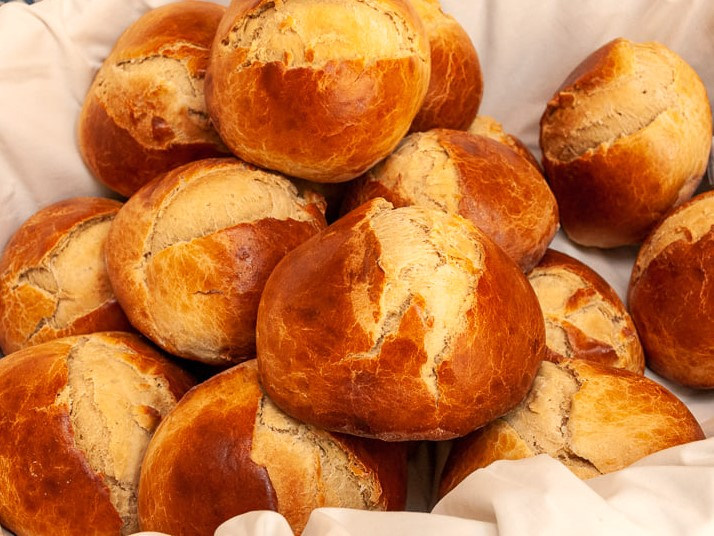
Bolo das Alhadas

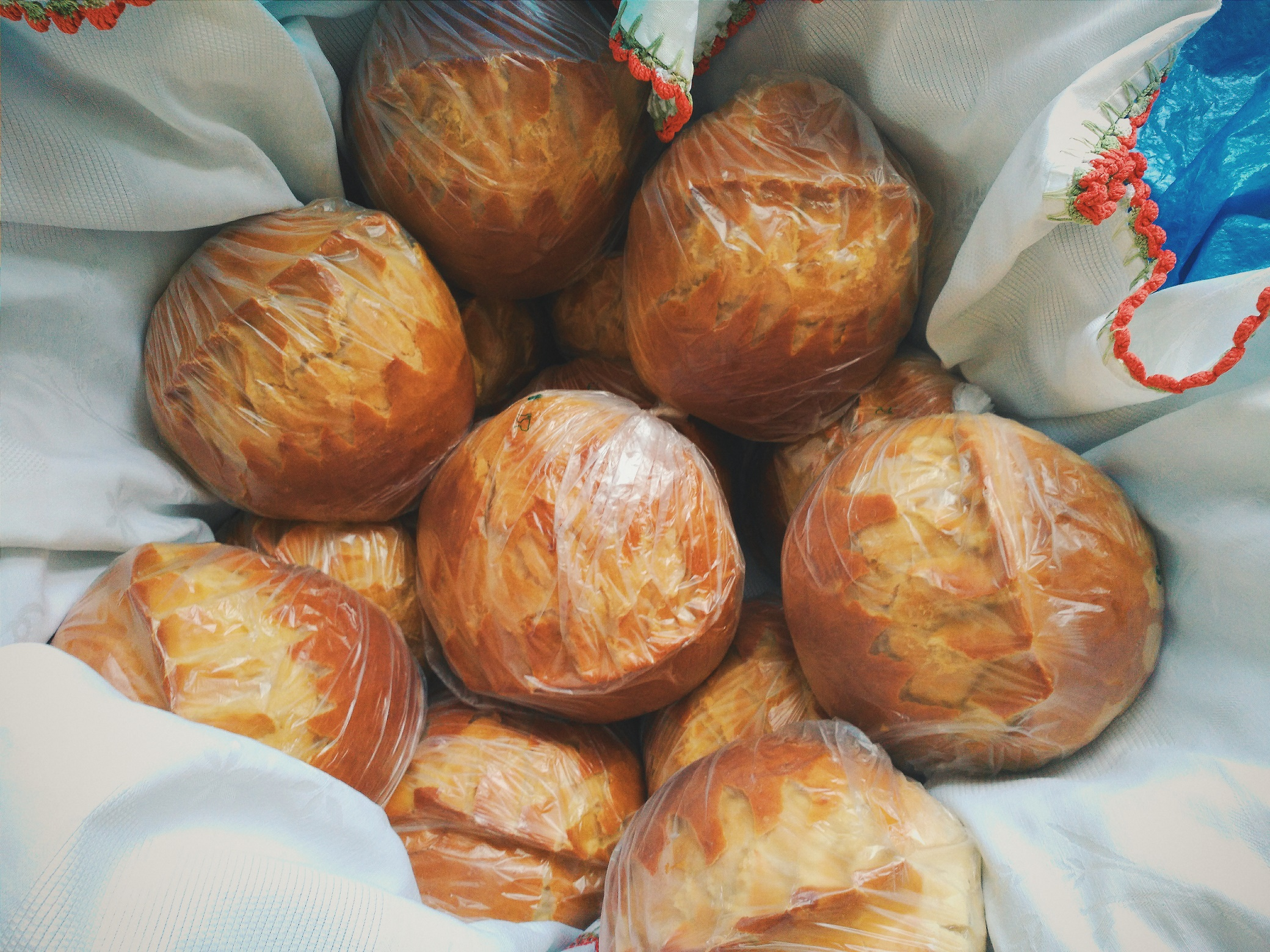
Bolo de Ançã

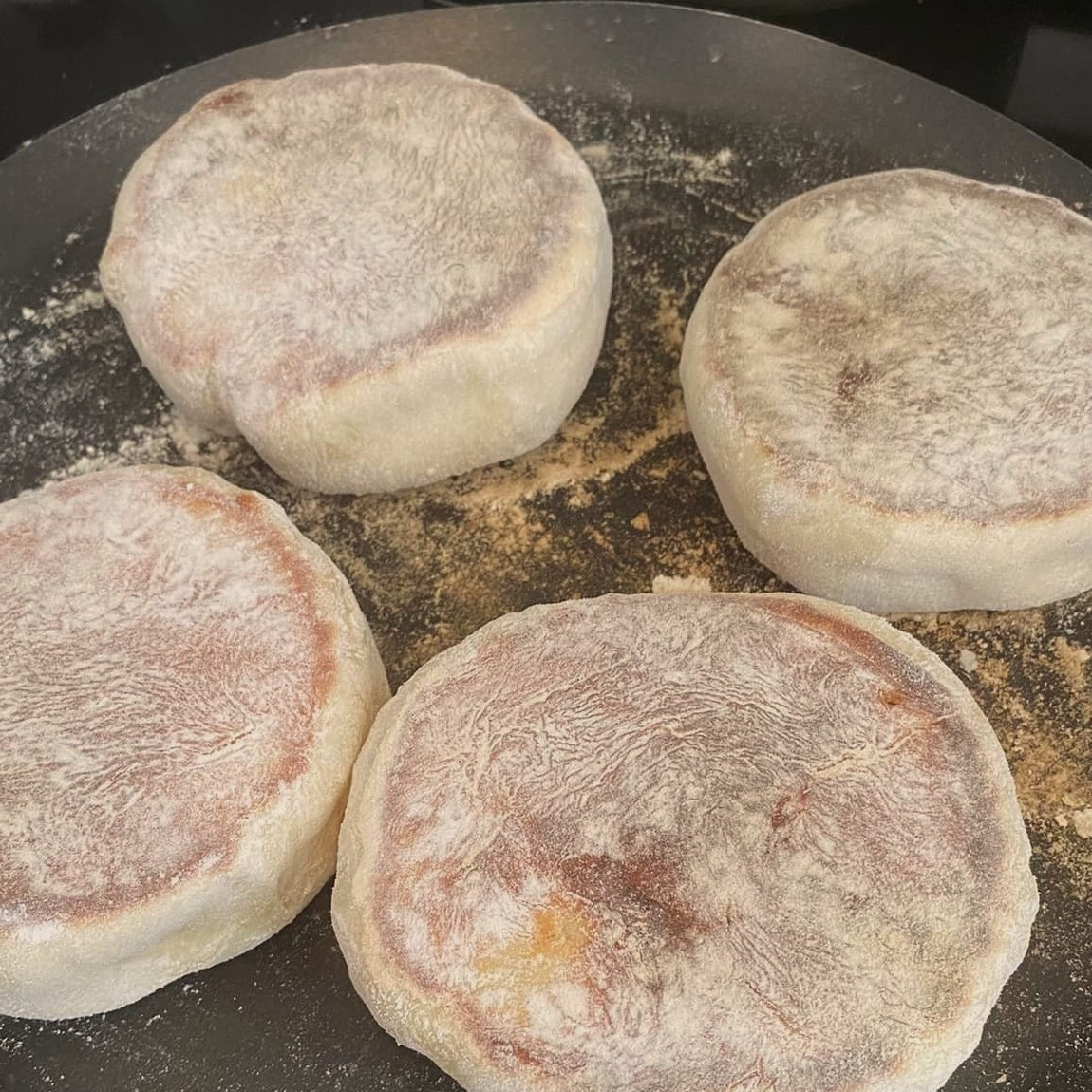
Bolo Lêvedo

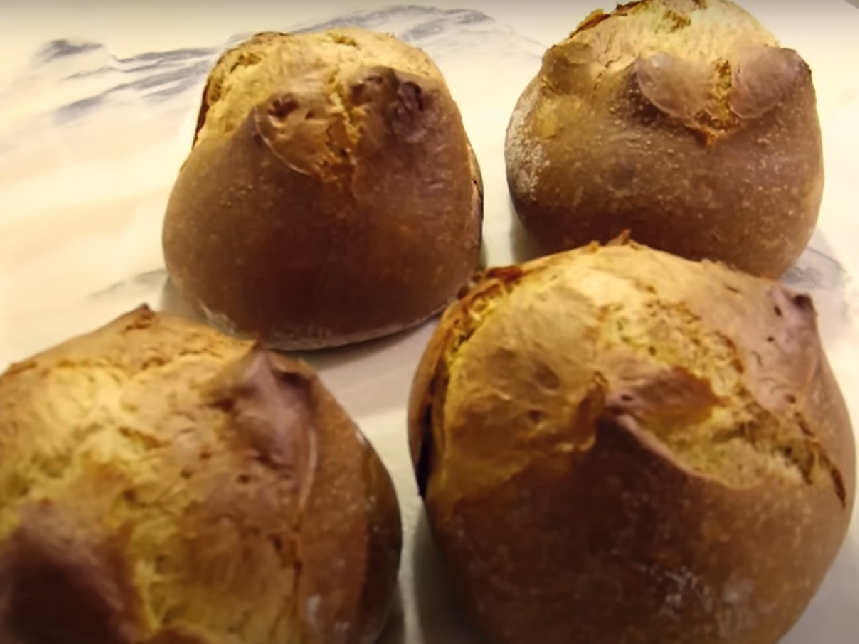
Bolo Podre

Bolo Rainha

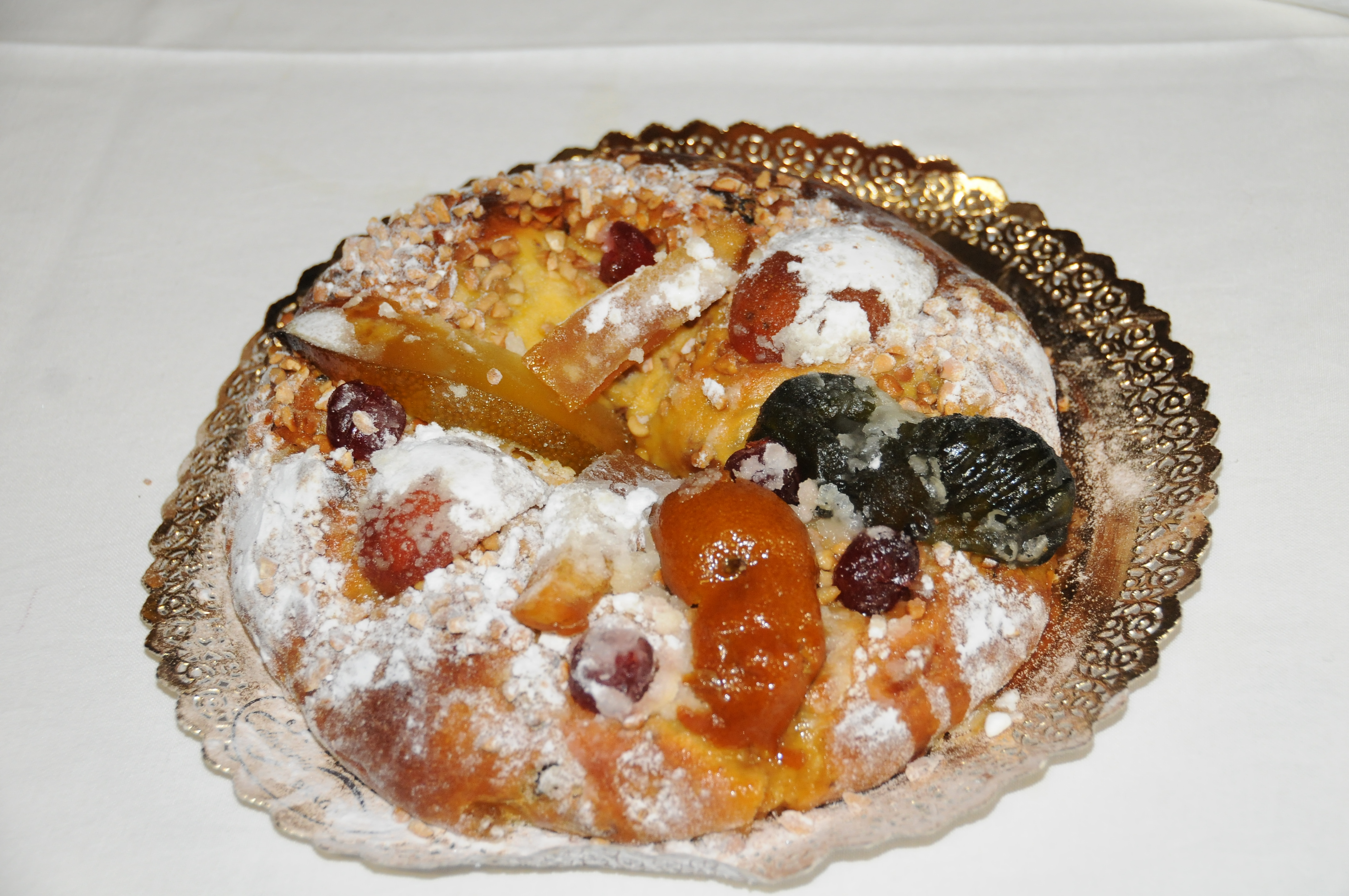
Bolo Rei

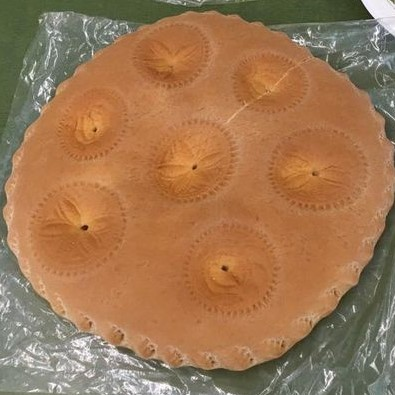
Bolos de Vésperas

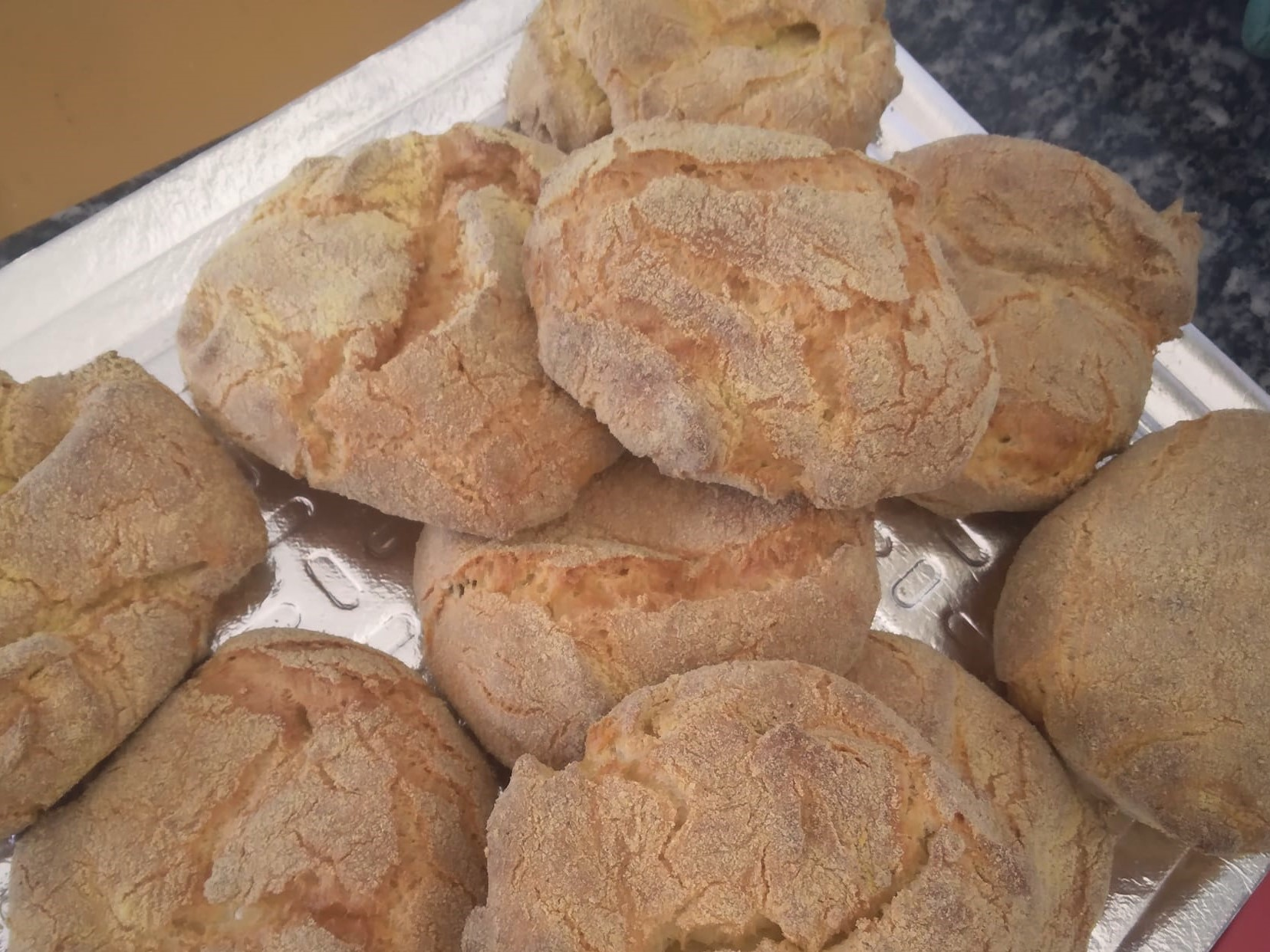
Broa Mimosa do Boco

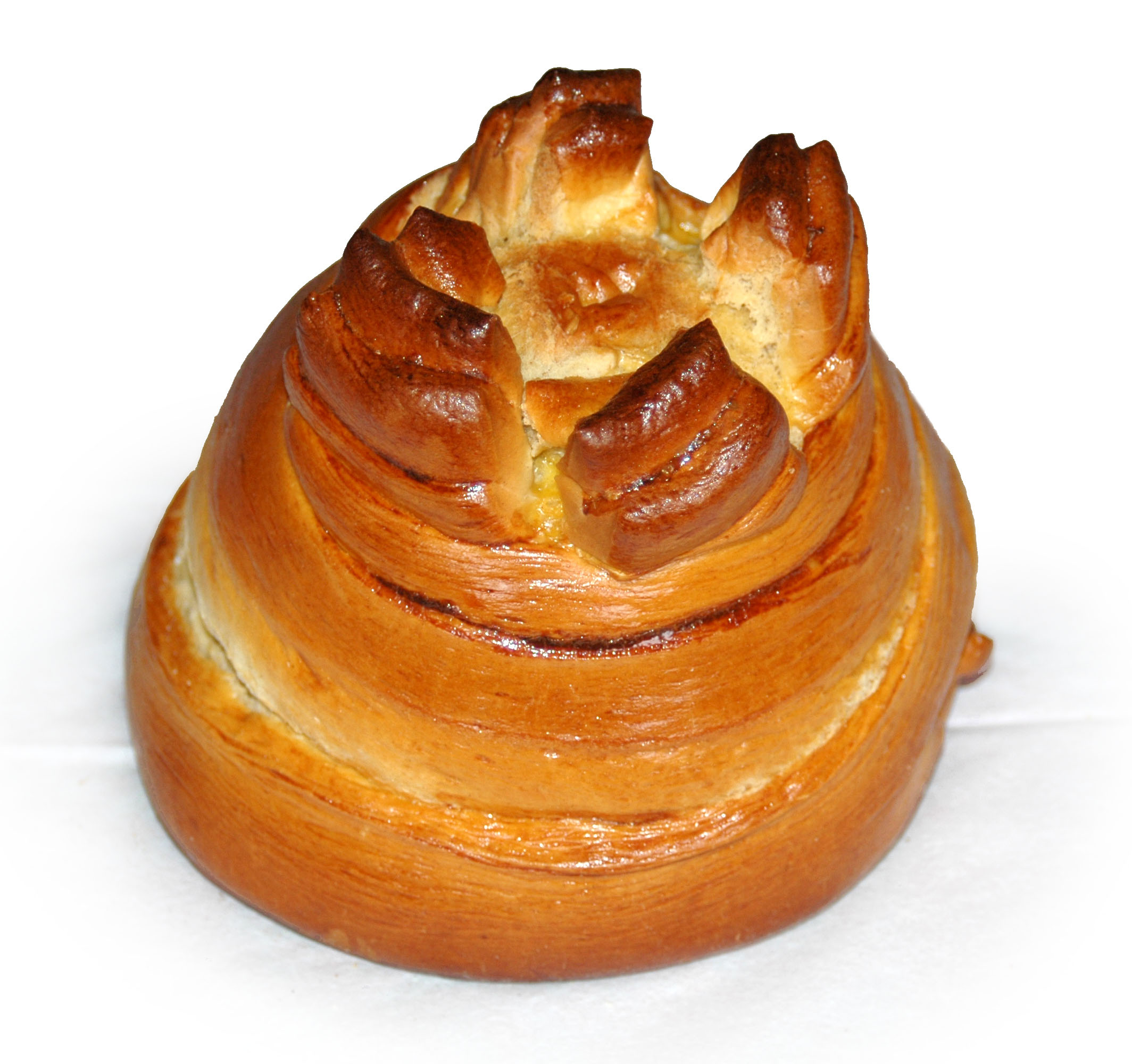
Fogaça da Feira

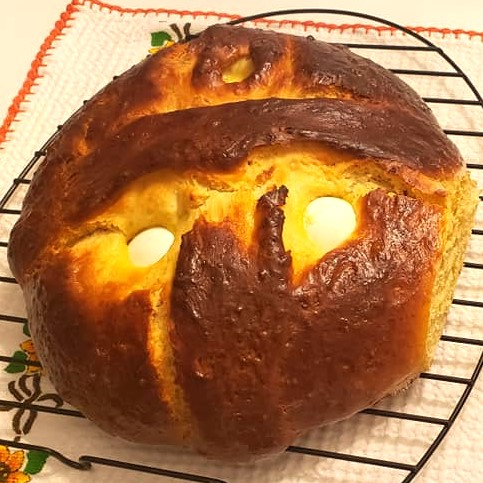
Folar da Páscoa

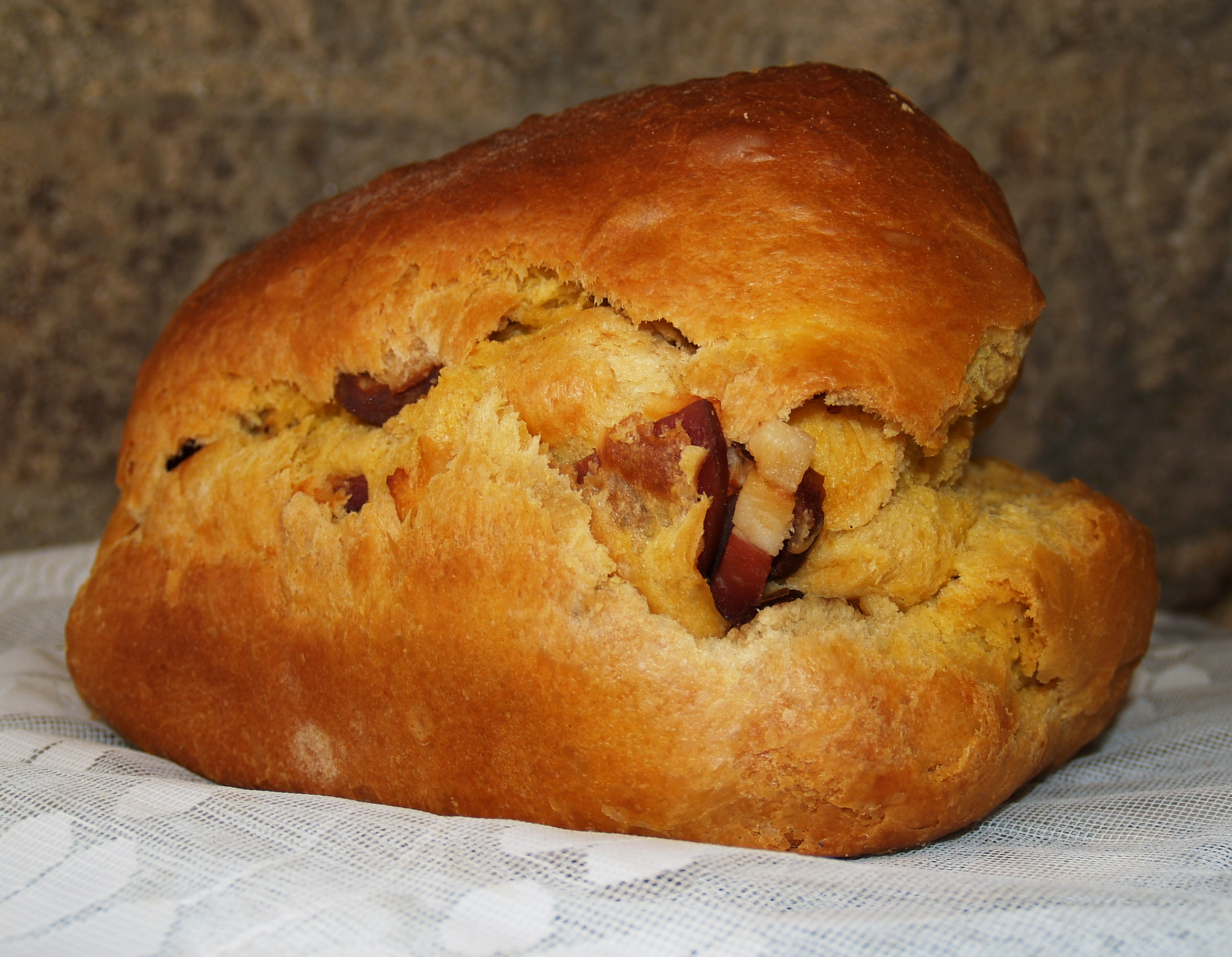
Folar de Chaves

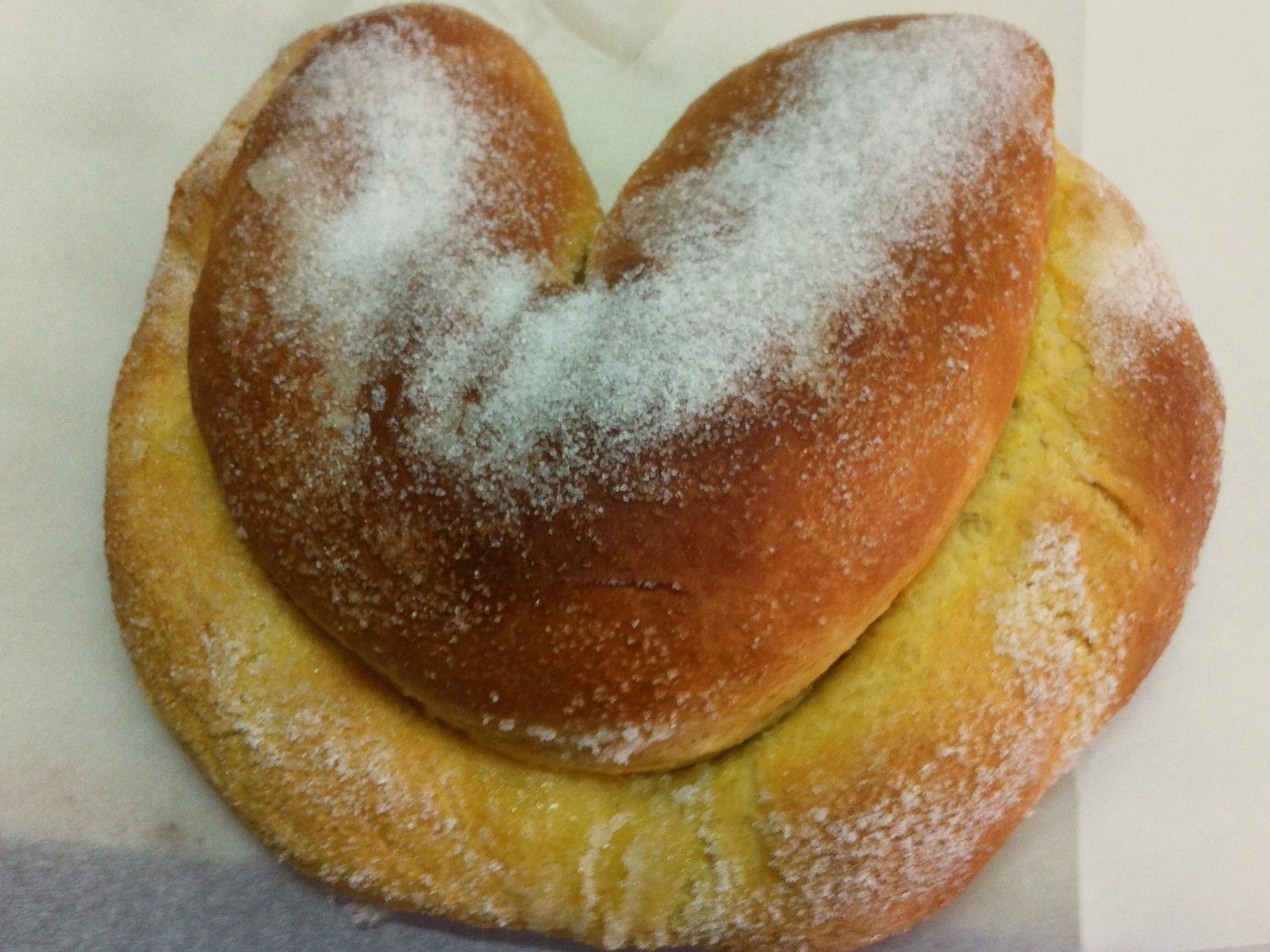
Folar de Vouzela

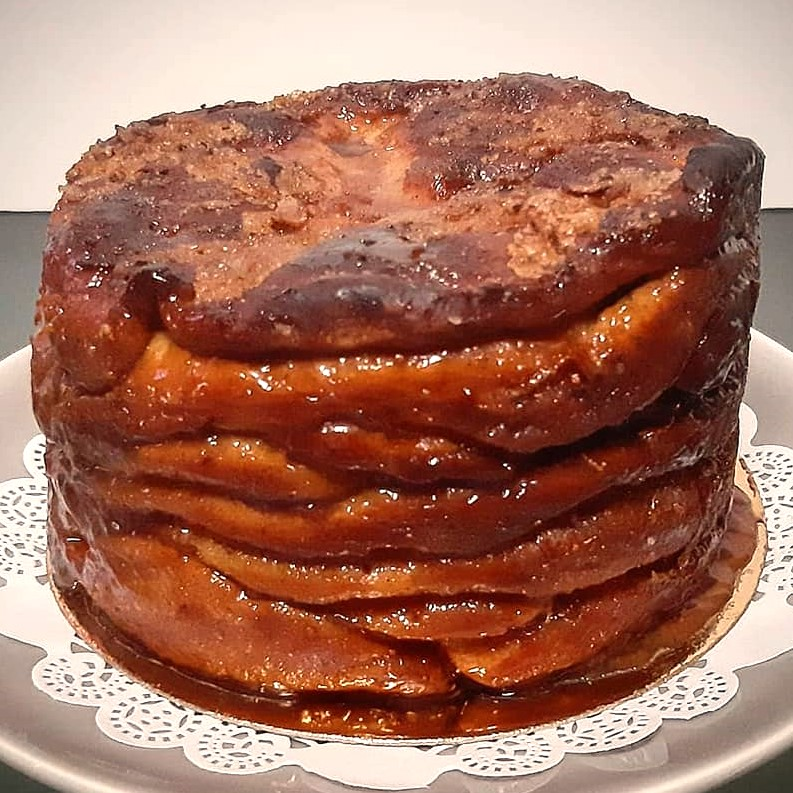
Folar de Olhão

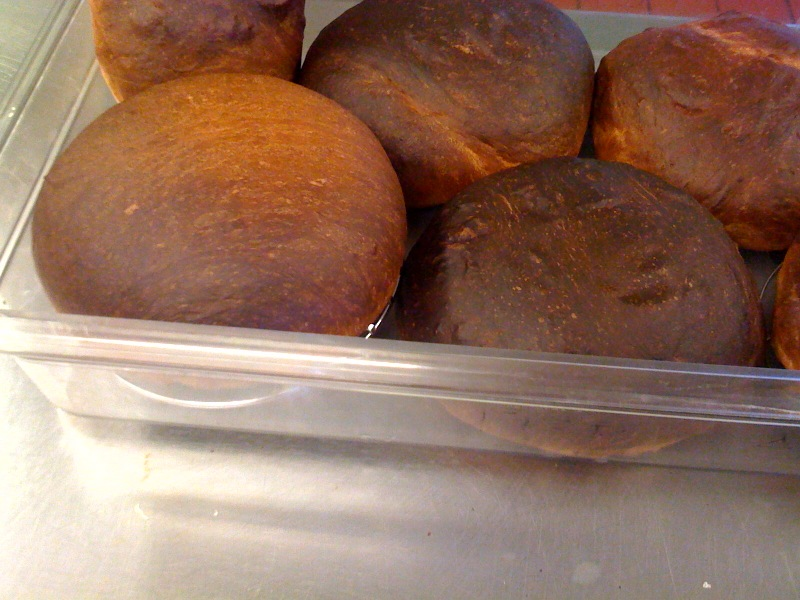
Massa Sovada

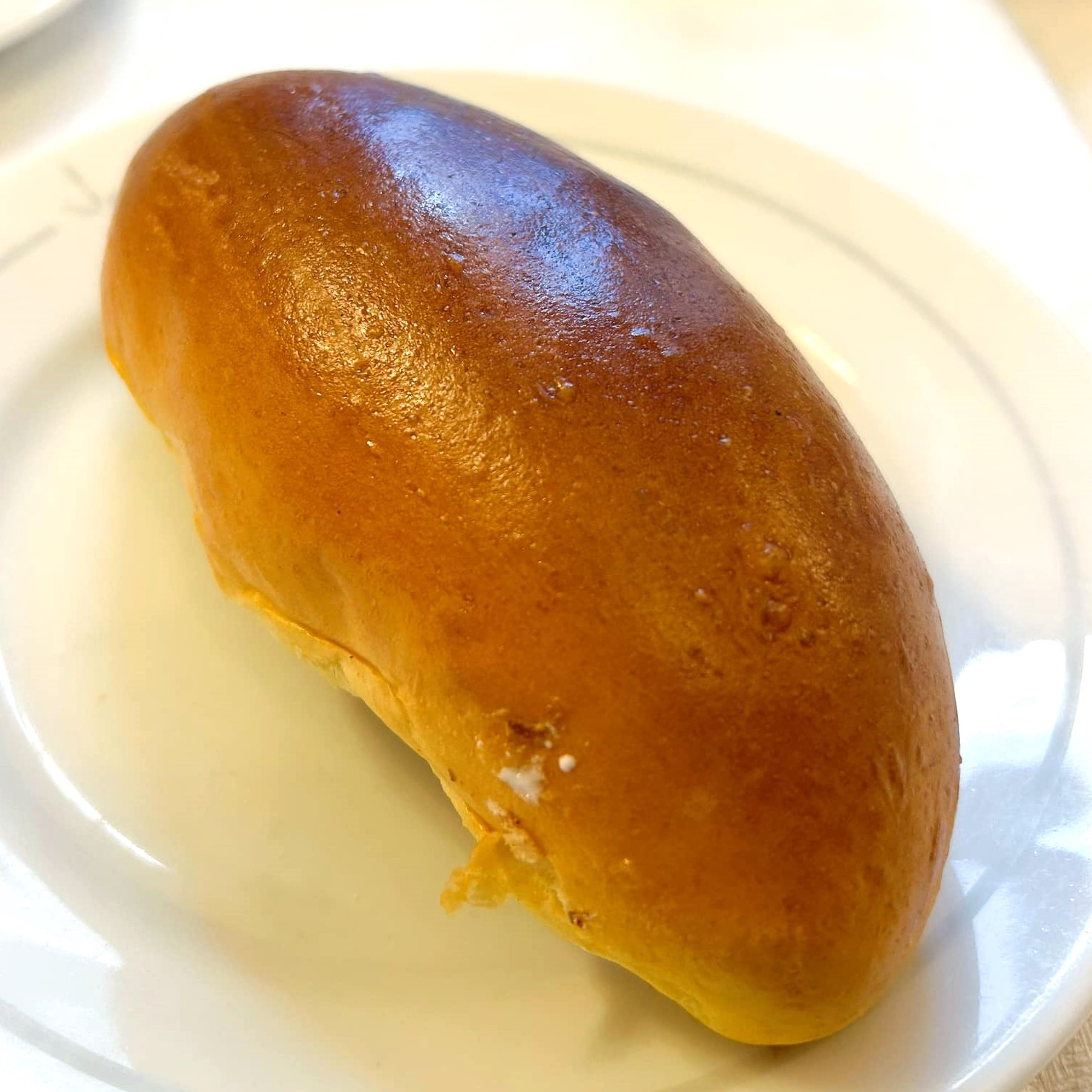
Pão de Leite

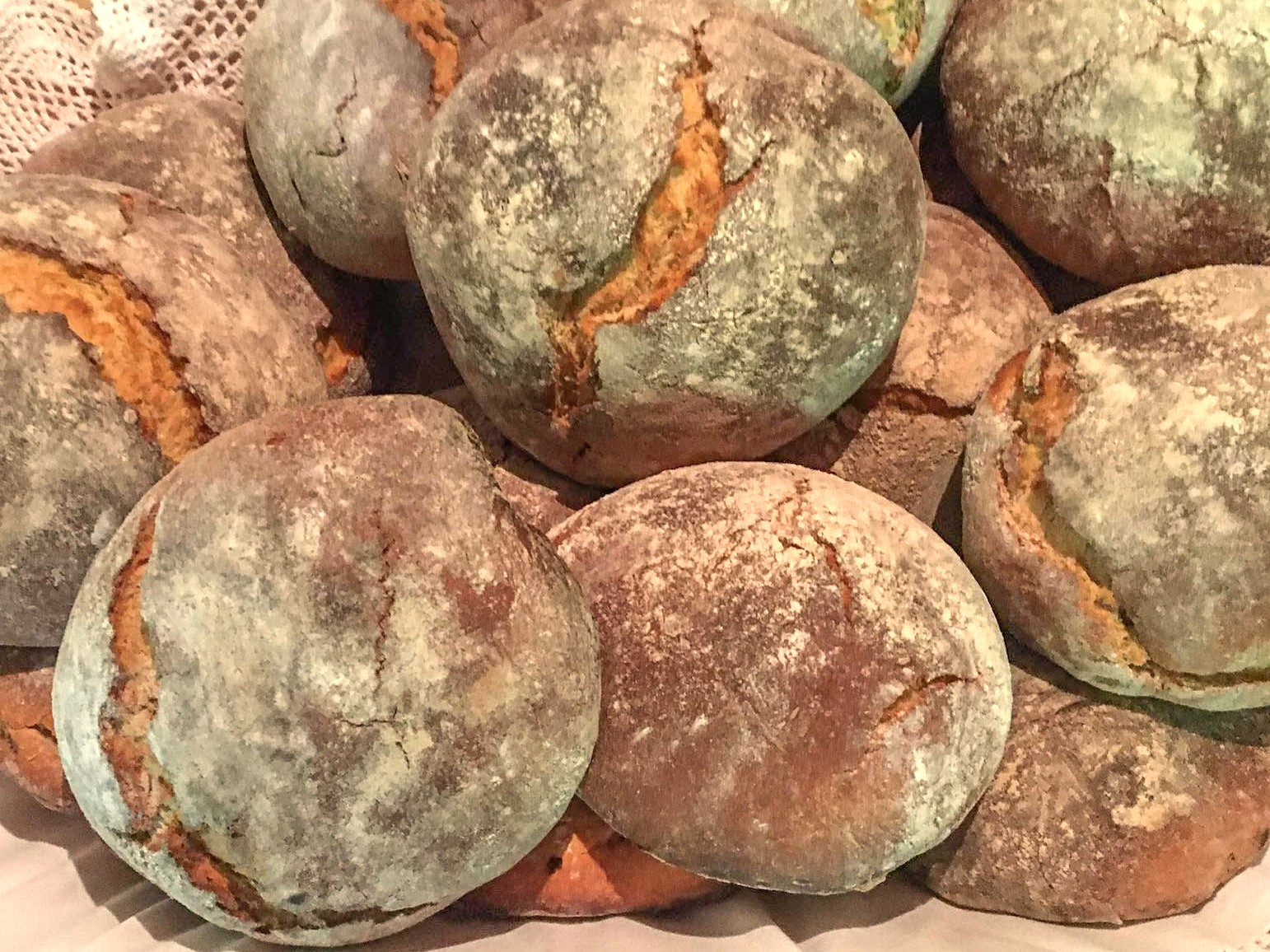
Pão Doce

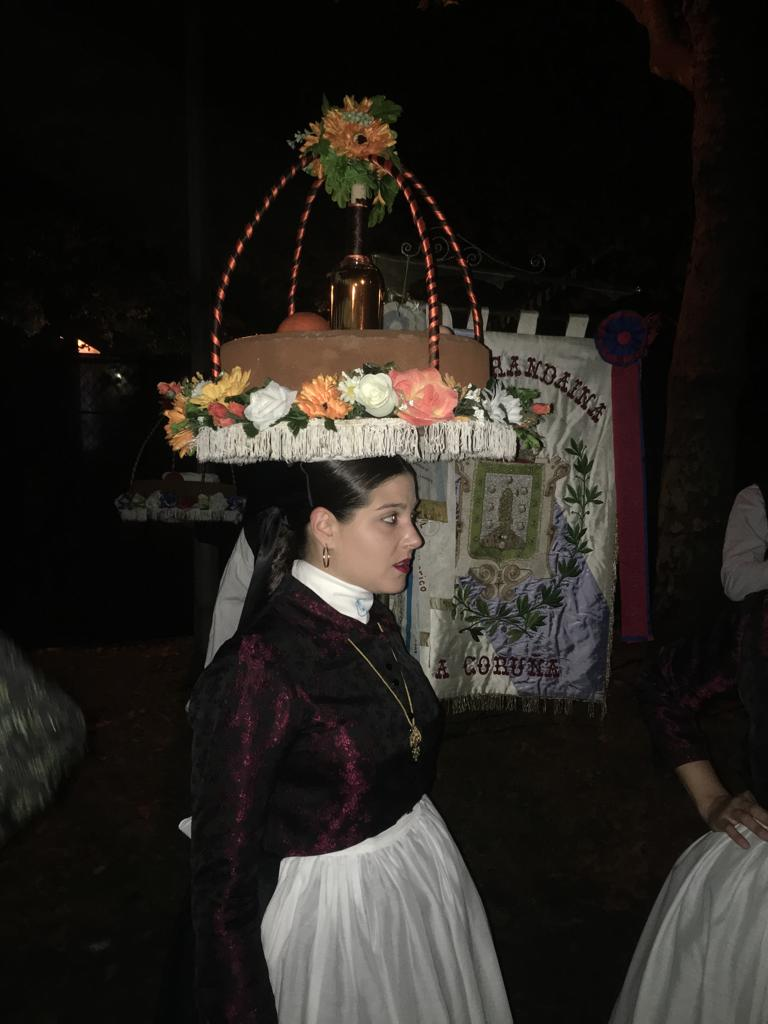
Requeifa - Wedding bread

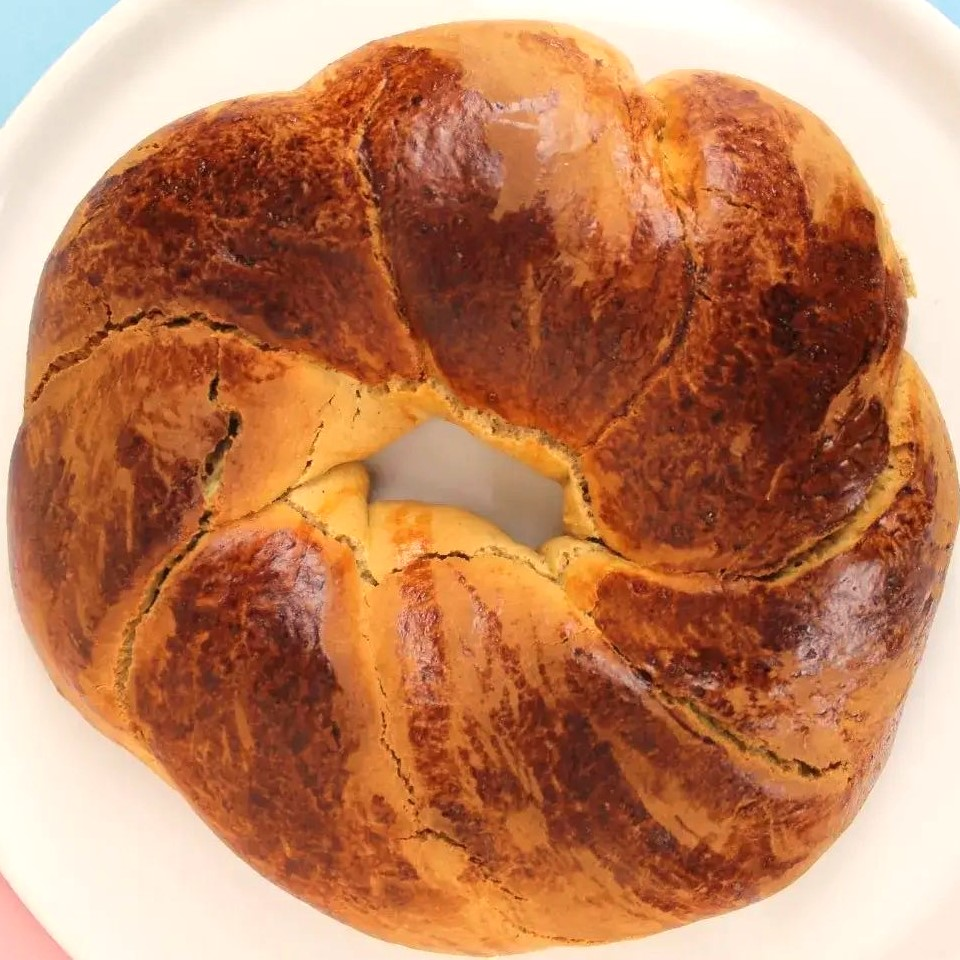
Regueifa da Páscoa

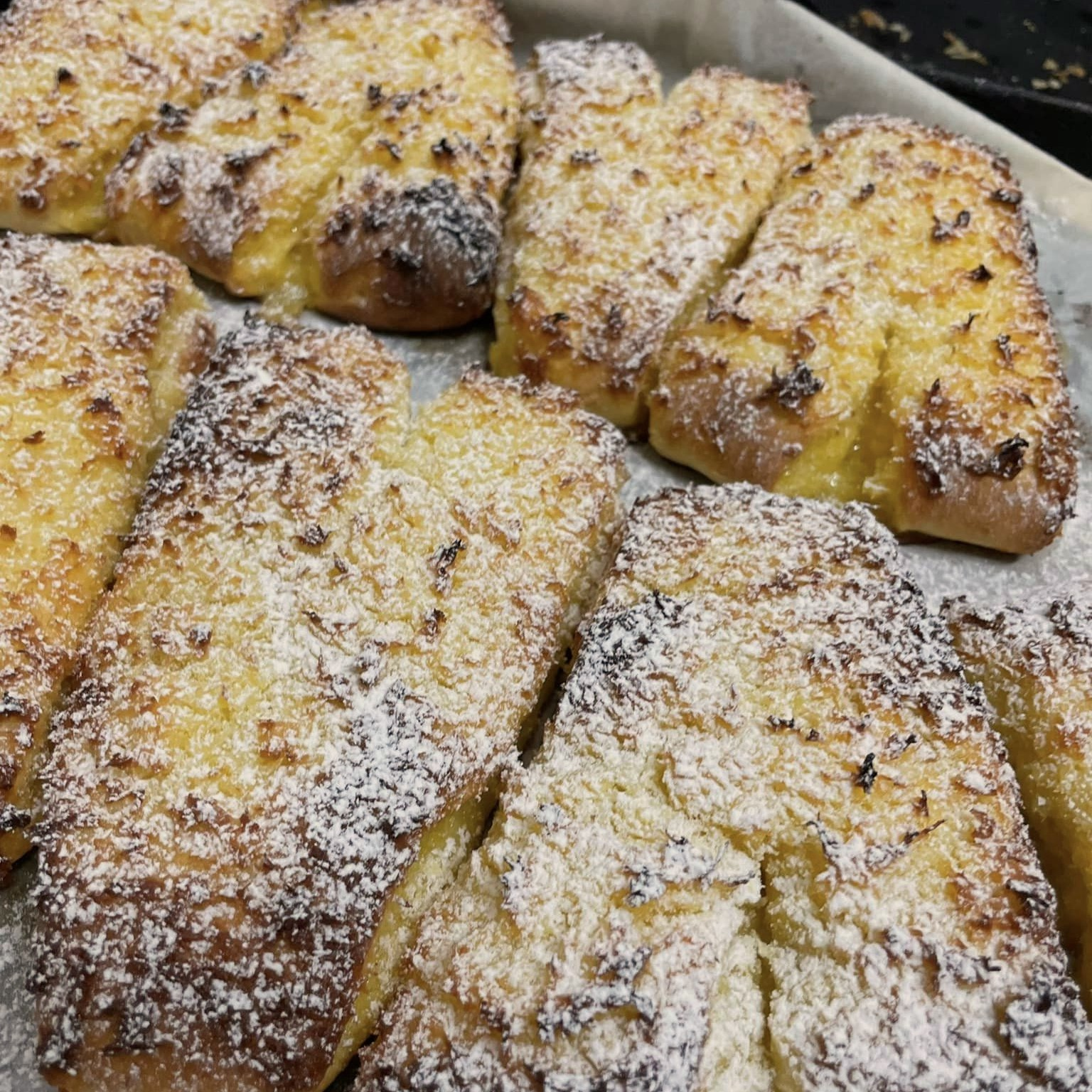
Viriato

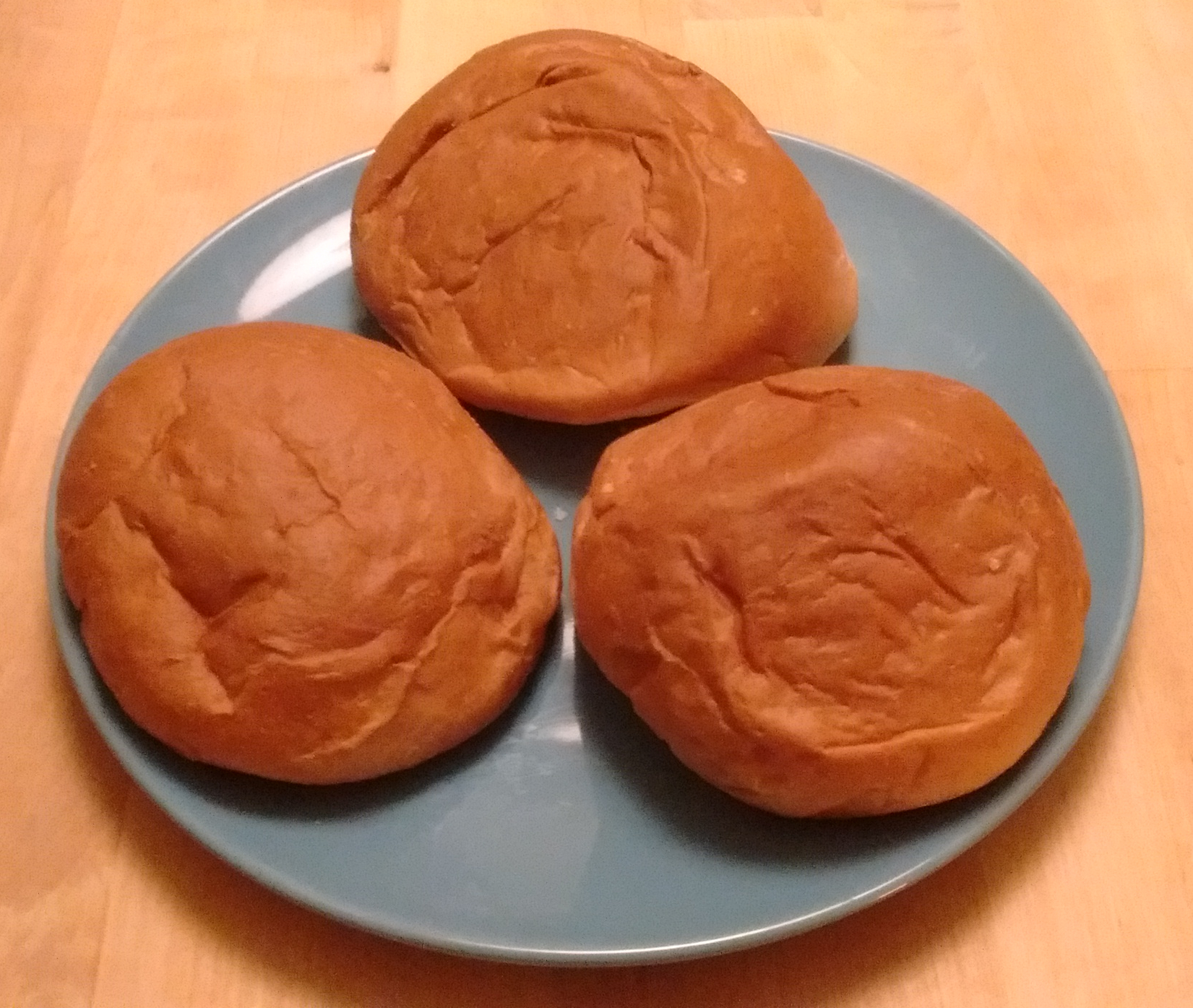
Portuguese sweet bread found in Massachusetts

== See also ==
- Brioche – Type of French pastry
- Easter bread – Bread traditionally eaten around Easter
- Ensaïmada – Pastry product from Mallorca (Balearic Islands)
- Pan dulce – Generic name for a range of Mexican baked goods
- Pandoro – Italian sweet bread
- Paska (bread) – Easter bread native to Russia, Slovakia and Ukraine
- List of sweet breads
