= Taira no Koremori =

Japanese commander

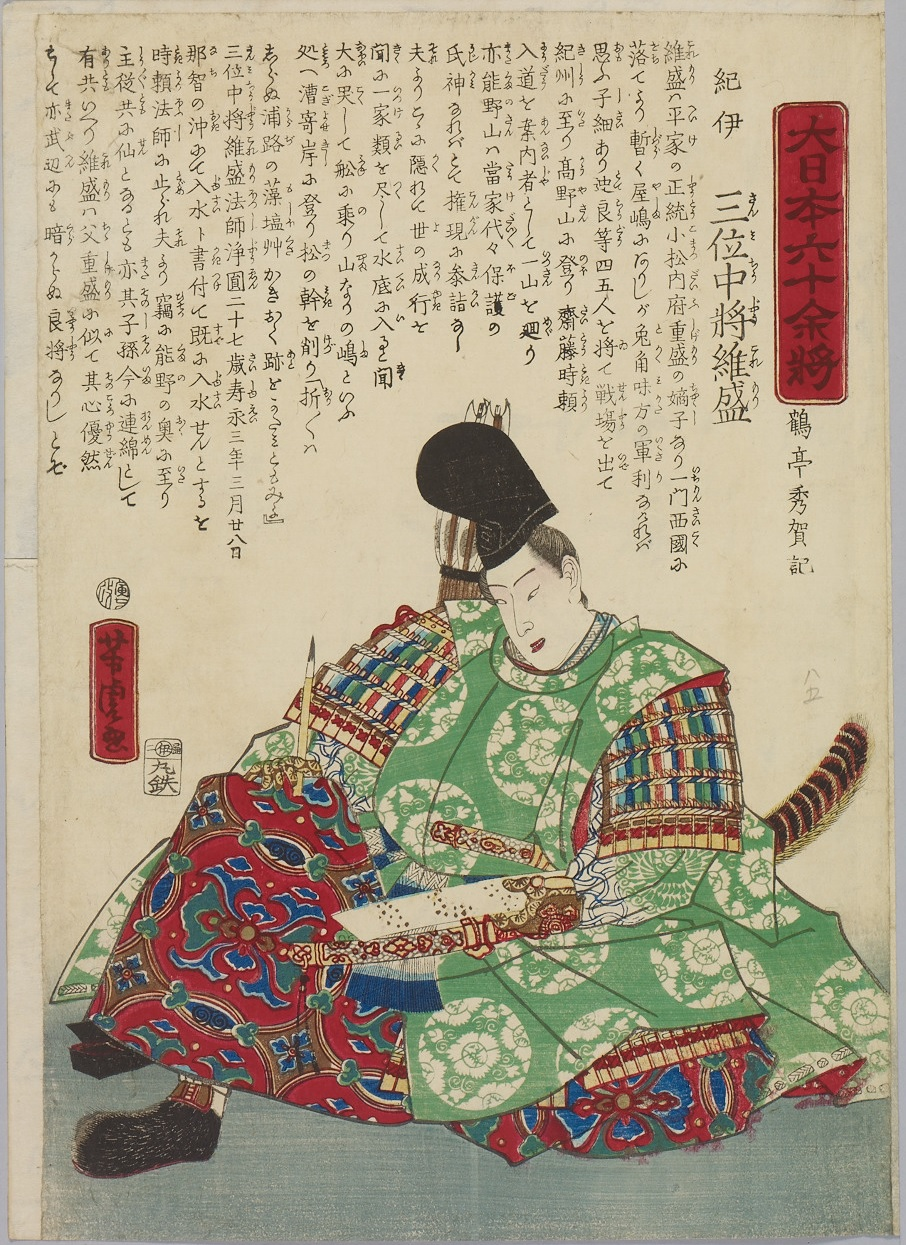
Sammichūjō Koremori woodblock print by Utagawa Yoshitora, 1866.

Taira no Koremori (平 維盛) (1158 – 1184) was one of the Taira clan's commanders and military lord during the Genpei War of the late Heian period of Japanese history. He was the eldest child of Taira no Shigemori, who was the eldest regent and heir of Taira no Kiyomori.

== Early life ==
Taira no Koremori was born in 1158. In contrast to his father, who was a warrior focused on battle, he grew up to be a young civil nobleman who enjoyed poetry and music.

== Genpei War ==
During the Genpei War, Koremori lost the Battle of Fujikawa in 1180. He invaded Echizen Province three years later, taking Hiuchiyama and several other of Minamoto no Yoshinaka's strongholds. However, Yoshinaka was able to take back the strongholds and defeat Koremori during the Battle of Kurikara Pass.

In 1184, Koremori slipped out of the Heike headquarters in Yashima, seeking to reunite with his family left behind in the capital. According to an account in the Heike Monogatari, fearing capture by Minamoto allies, he reluctantly turned back. Travelling to Mount Kōya instead, he met the priest Takiguchi (formerly Saito Tokiyori) and became a monk. He then completed the Kumano Kodō pilgrimage, boarded a boat at Hamanomiya-oji, and jumped into the sea.

== Family ==
His sons, Taira no Takakiyo and Taira no Chikazane, became the last members of the Taira clan after most of their relatives were killed or committed suicide in the Battle of Dan-no-Ura in 1185.

== See also ==
- Tale of Heike
