= King's Hawaiian =

Family-owned bakery from Los Angeles

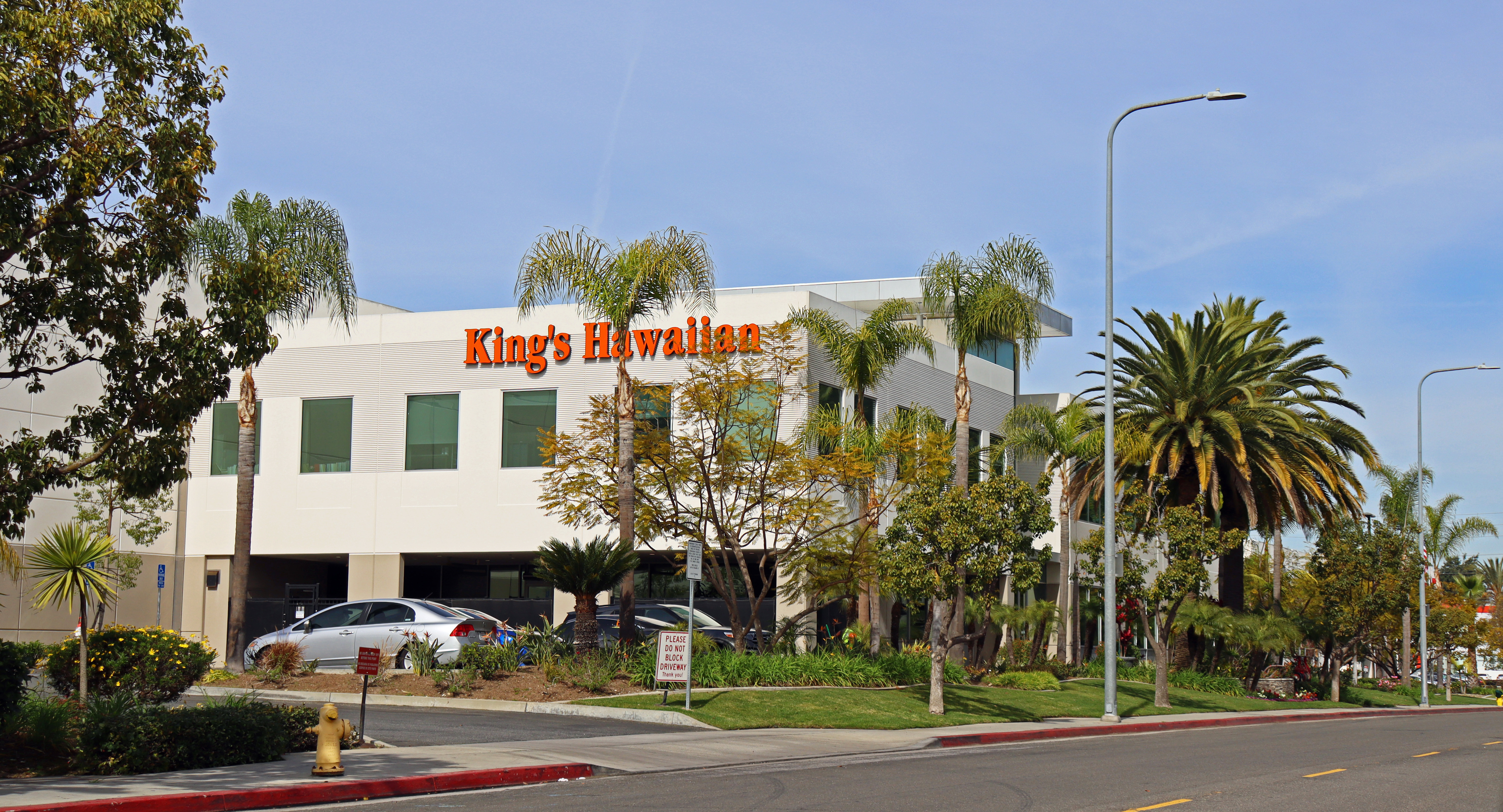
- King's Hawaiian headquarters in Los Angeles
- Type: Privately held company
- Industry: Bakery
- Predecessor: Robert's Bakery
- Founded: 1950
- Founder: Robert R. Taira
- Headquarters: Harbor Gateway, Los Angeles, California, U.S. (Torrance, California postal address)
- Website: kingshawaiian.com

King's Hawaiian is a Los Angeles-based family-owned and operated bakery, known chiefly for its Hawaiian bread. It was founded by Robert Taira in Hilo, Hawaii, in 1950.

== History ==
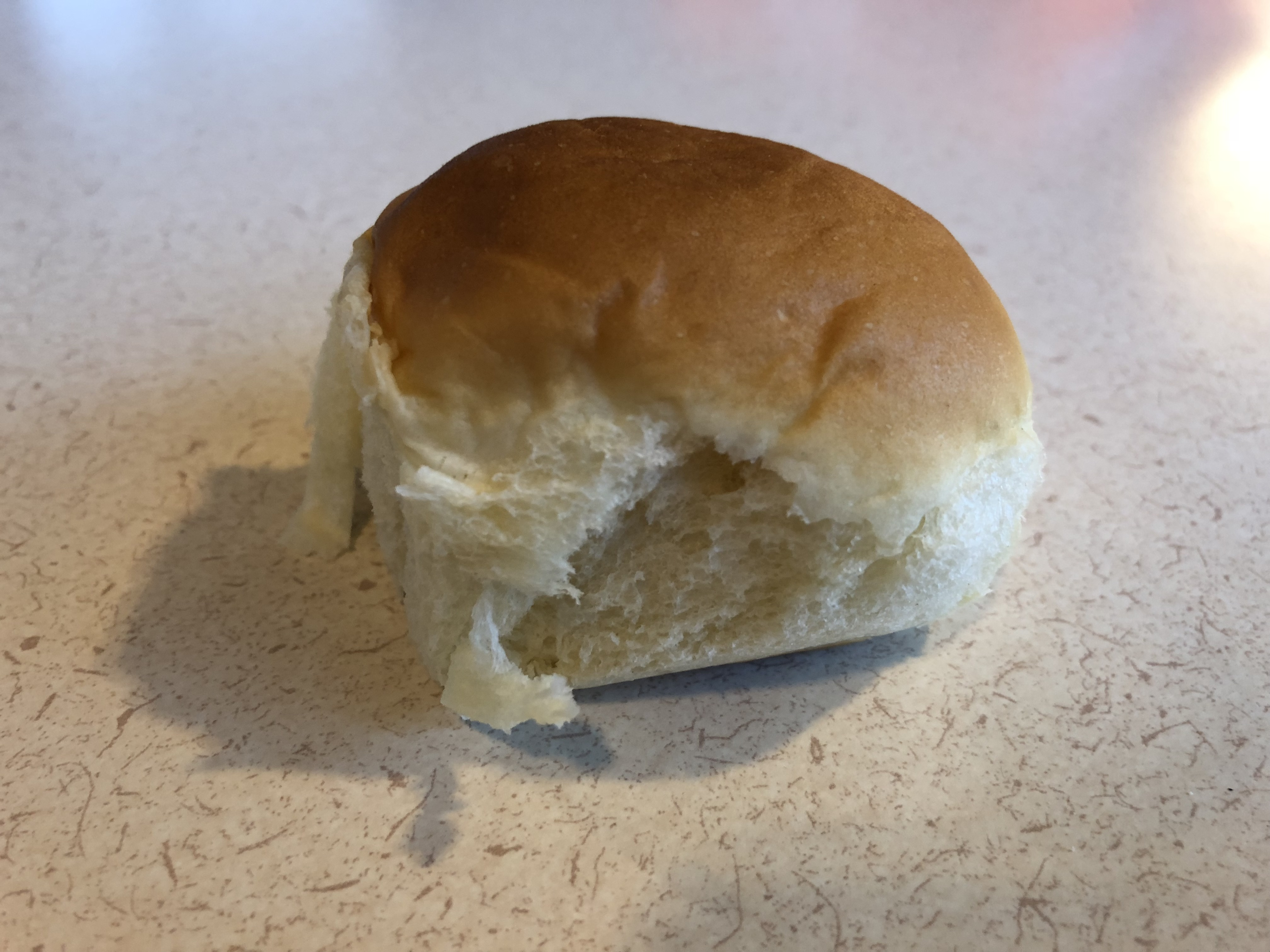
King's Hawaiian flagship Hawaiian Sweet Roll

Robert Taira founded the company, then called Robert's Bakery, in Hilo, Hawaii, in 1950. Taira originally specialized in baking cakes. He got his big break when he figured out how to extend the notoriously short shelf life of Portuguese sweet bread, which he could then sell in large volumes to supermarkets as shelf-stable "Hawaiian bread". In 1963, the company moved to Honolulu and changed its name to King's Bakery. In 1977, the company expanded to the mainland United States by opening a bakery, King's Hawaiian Bakery, in Torrance, California.

By the 1980s, Taira's company, King's Hawaiian Bakery, was grossing US$20 million annually. In 1988 the company moved its headquarters to the mainland. The Honolulu bakery closed in 1992. In 2002, the company opened a new restaurant and bakery called The Local Place Bakery & Cafe in Torrance.

Taira died in May 2003 and left the company under the control of his family. In October 2003, King's Hawaiian moved its bakery to a 151,000-square foot facility in the Harbor Gateway neighborhood of Los Angeles (which has a Torrance postal address). At the time, the new bakery was expected to be big enough for many years. However, by 2007, the company's bread had become so popular throughout the United States that it had already reached the limits of its manufacturing capacity, and the cost of shipping its bread products nationwide was becoming a problem.

In 2010, King's Hawaiian announced that it was planning to open a 111,000-square foot bakery and distribution center in Oakwood, Georgia, by fall 2011. In building a new bakery from the ground up, the company took advantage of the opportunity to heavily automate and computerize the new bakery's operations from start to finish. The manufacturing process from mixing raw ingredients to inserting baked bread into plastic bags is performed almost entirely by machines at the Georgia bakery. As of 2015, the most labor-intensive segment of the process which could not yet be automated was "casepacking", the process of manually inserting bagged bread into cardboard boxes for transport in bulk, because the fresh-baked bread is so soft and fragile.

Fast food restaurant chain Arby's seasonally sells sandwiches featuring King's Hawaiian buns. The sandwiches are the King's Hawaiian BLT and Roast Beef and Swiss (which includes Grey Poupon Honey Dijon mustard). There is also a seasonally-available King's Hawaiian Fish (which includes a slice of tomato and a slice of Market Cheddar, along with the usual lettuce and tartar sauce). In September 2014, a barbecue brisket sandwich was introduced on the King's Hawaiian buns. It is named "BBQ Brisket Sandwich"

In 2016, King's launched a new line of BBQ Sauces consisting of four flavors; Big Island Lava, Smoked Bacon, Original Sweet Pineapple, and Kona Coffee.

By February 2018, King's Hawaiian had expanded its Georgia bakery from 100 employees to more than 650 employees with three production lines. By July 2019, approximately 75% of King's Hawaiian production was coming from the Georgia bakery.

In December 2023, King's Hawaiian disclosed that it was working on its first expansion into the Midwest. The company revealed that it was planning to spend almost $200 million to build a 300,000-square foot facility in Taylorsville, Indiana.

== Marketing ==
In 1980, King's Hawaiian sponsored Ron Colson and Roland Leong in the National Hot Rod Association Number 5 Funny Car and winning that season's NHRA Winston Finals in Ontario, California.

In 2014, King's Hawaiian used MLB player Shane Victorino to advertise their products, using the slogan "Go Pupule".

In 2016, King's Hawaiian entered a three-story-tall float representing the beauty of the Hawaiian Islands in the NYC Pride March. The float included a volcano that erupted confetti and a stage for musical performers dressed in pro-LGBT attire.

In 2018, King's Hawaiian released an 82-minute Halloween-themed animated film titled The Legend of Hallowaiian featuring the voices of Mark Hamill, Vanessa Williams, and Tia Carrere. The film was produced by Canadian animation studio Arcana Studio and King Hawaiian's production company Fresh Baked Films and distributed by SC Films International.

In 2021, King's Hawaiian announced a year-long marketing partnership with chef, restaurateur and television personality Guy Fieri.

In 2022, King’s Hawaiian entered a sponsorship deal with NASCAR Cup Series team RFK Racing to sponsor driver/co-owner Brad Keselowski in multiple races until the 2024 season. Beginning in 2025, they partnered with Denny Hamlin and Joe Gibbs Racing.

== See also ==
- List of brand name breads
- List of Hawaiian restaurants
