= Taira no Chikazane =

Japanese samurai

Taira no Chikazane (平 親真) (1178-1225) was the last living member of the Taira clan. He was the son of Taira no Koremori, grandson of Taira no Shigemori, and great-grandson of Taira no Kiyomori. He and his brother, Taira no Takakiyo, were the only male members of the Taira clan to survive the Genpei War. His brother was executed in 1199, but Chikazane lived until 1225. His death marked the end of the Taira clan.

Oda Nobunaga claimed descent from him.
