= Takunori Taira =

Japanese engineer

Takunori Taira from the National Institutes of Natural Sciences, Japan, Institute for Molecular Science, in Okazaki, Aichi, was named Fellow of the Institute of Electrical and Electronics Engineers (IEEE) in 2014 for contributions to micro solid-state photonics.
