= Taira no Shigemori =

Eldest son of Taira no Kiyomori (1138–1179)

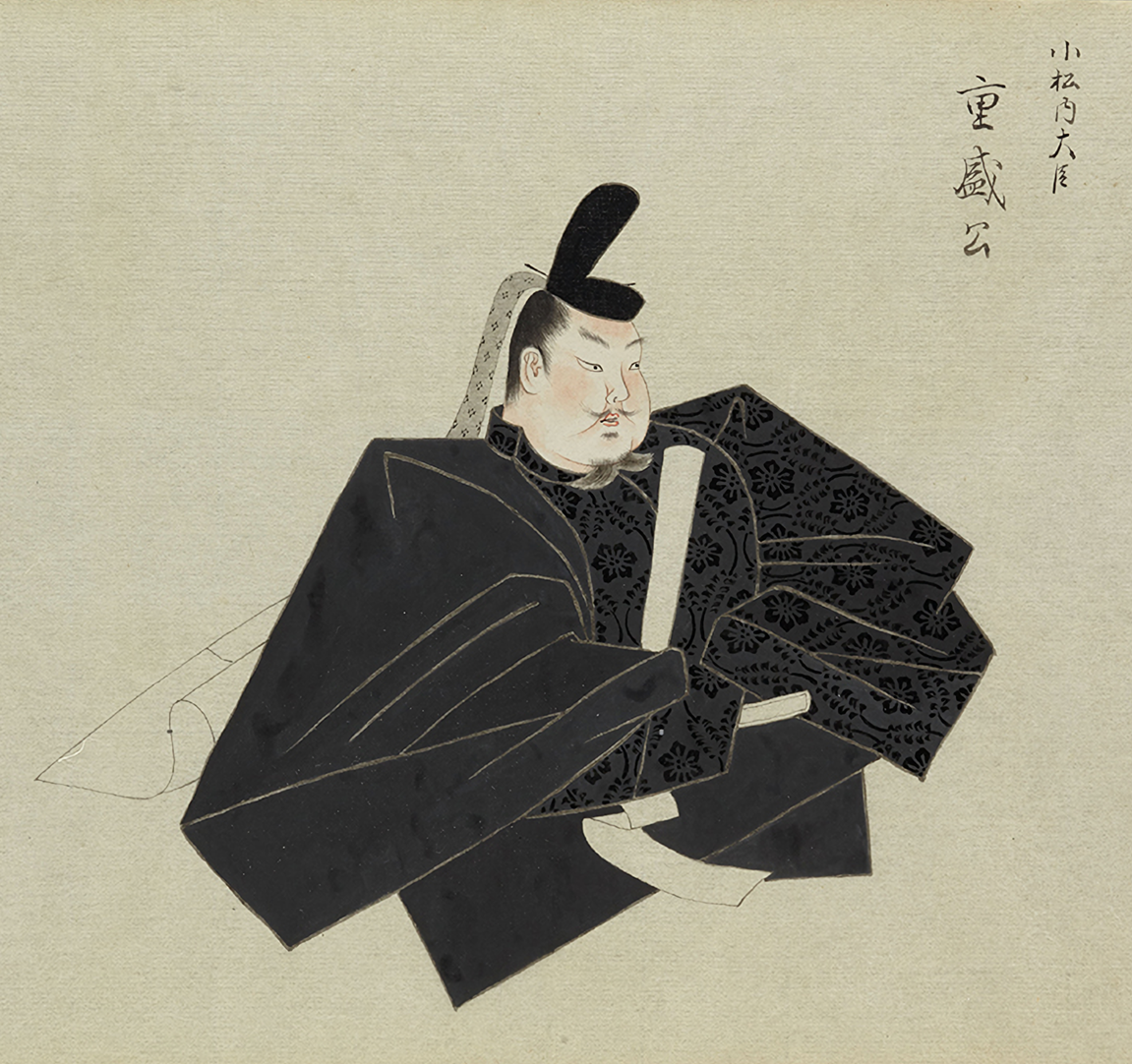
Portrait of Taira no Shigemori (from the Tenshi-Sekkan Miei)

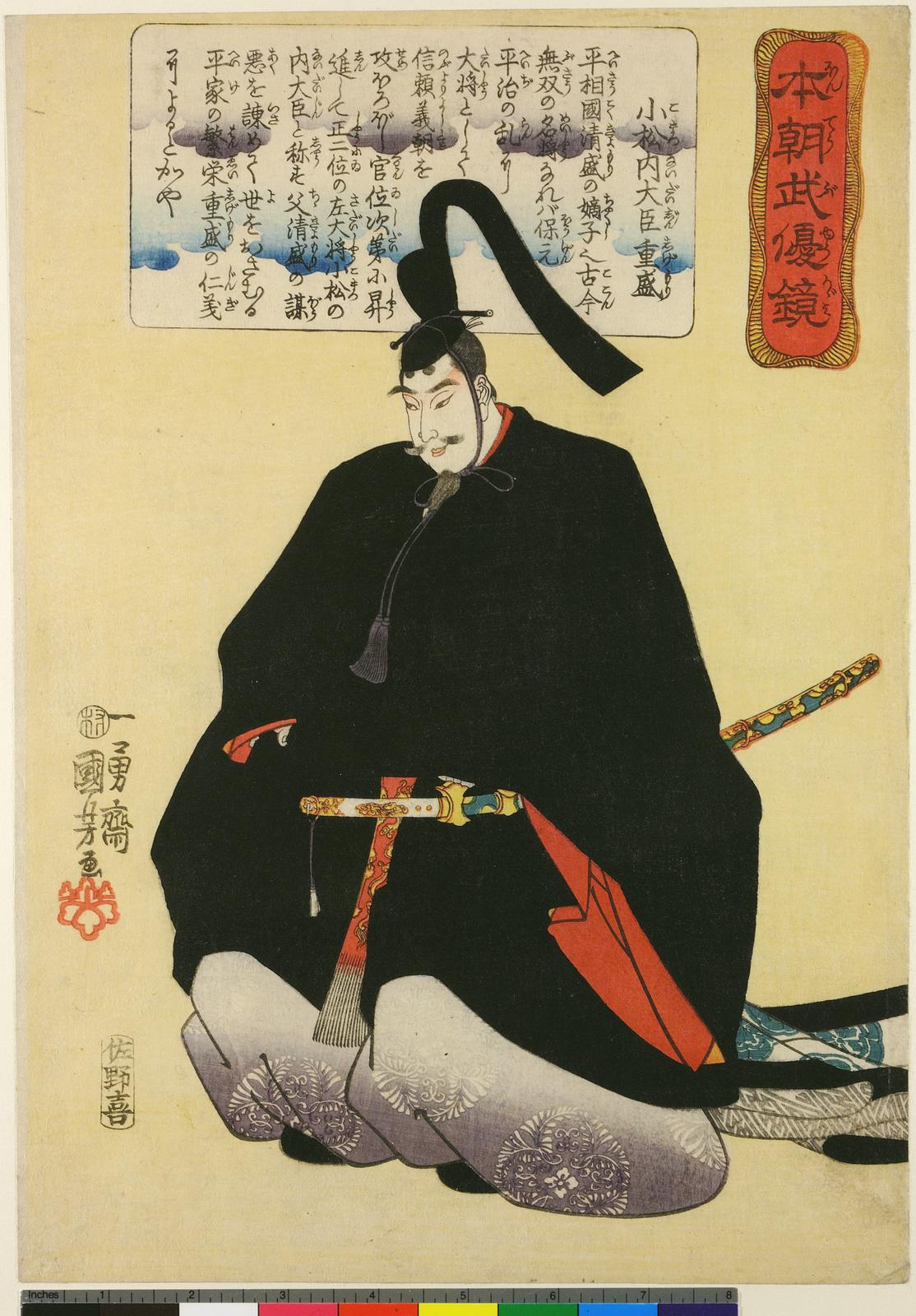
Shigemori by Utagawa Kuniyoshi

Taira no Shigemori (平 重盛; Japanese pronunciation: [tä́ì.ɾä̀ nò̞ | ɕì.ꜜɡé̞.mò̞.ɾʲì, -ꜜŋé̞-]; 1138 – September 2, 1179) was the eldest regent of the Taira clan patriarch, Taira no Kiyomori. He supported his father in the Heiji Rebellion. He died two years before his father. His son, Taira no Koremori, became a monk in 1184 during Genpei War period, and drowned himself. Oda Nobunaga claimed to have descended from him through his grandson, Taira no Chikazane.

== Life ==
Shigemori was caught between his father Kiyomori and Cloistered Emperor Go-Shirakawa, and suffered mentally. His words "If I am loyal, I cannot be filial; if I am filial, I cannot be loyal" (忠ならんと欲すれば孝ならず、孝ならんと欲すれば忠ならず) are well known in Japan. He was Kiyomori's favourite son, but as he had died ("some said of grief at his father's stubborn and misguided treatment of his opponents") his brother, Taira no Munemori was left in charge of the affairs of state.

== Portrayal in The Tale of the Heike ==
Taira no Shigemori appeared in The Tale of the Heike, one of the traditional classics in medieval Japan.

=== Death ===
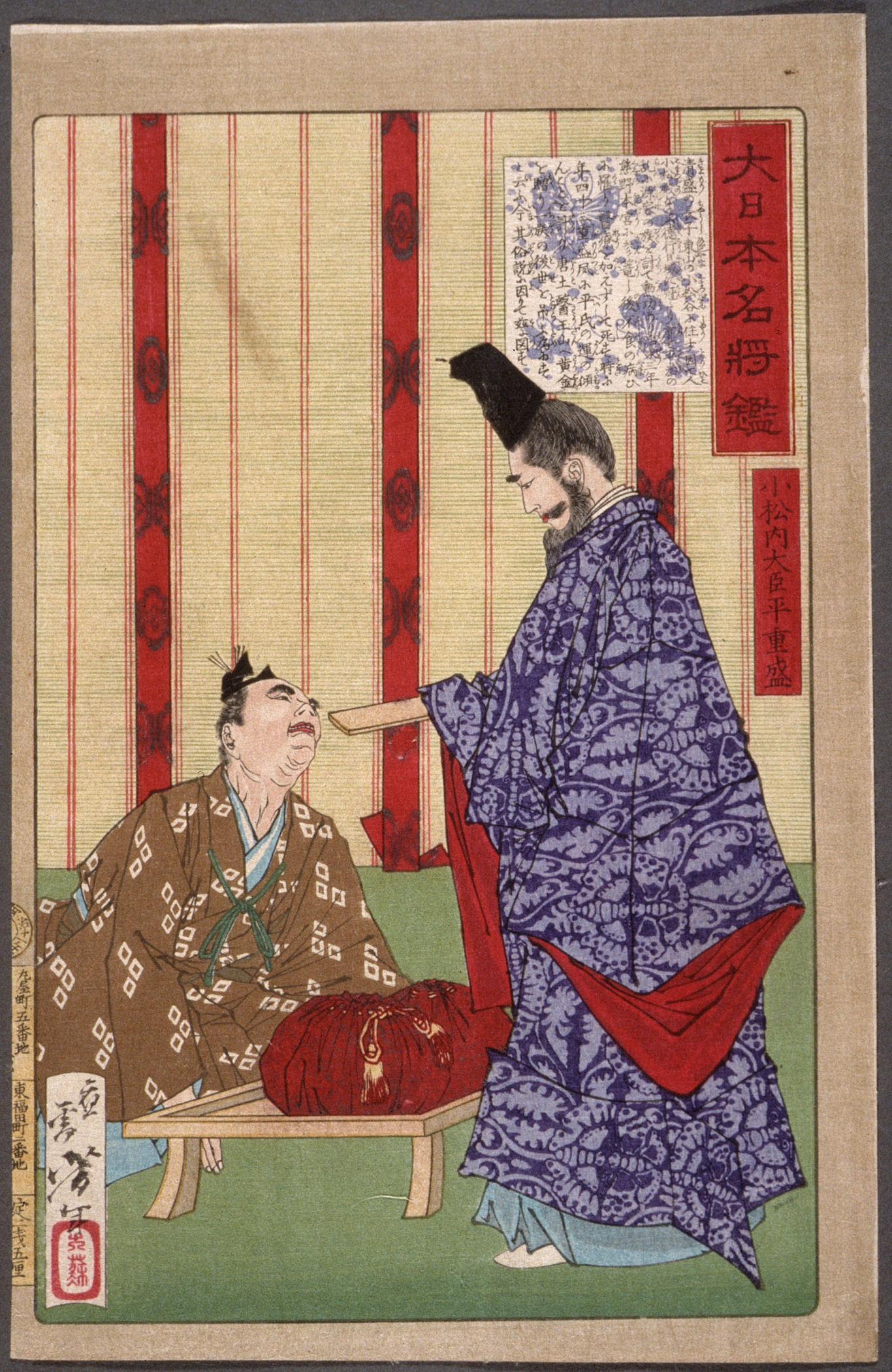
Taira no Shigemori sending gold to the Temple of King Ashoka in China to pray for the prosperity of the Taira clan

On May 12, 1179, a great whirlwind swept through the imperial capital, Kyoto. Many people died along with many buildings destroyed by the tornado. Only a few days after the incident, he fell ill and died at the age of 42, possibly due to poisonous smoke that came from the tornado.

=== Lanterns ===
Shigemori built a temple forty-eight bays long, inspired by the forty-eight great vows of the Buddha Amida, and in each bay he hung a lantern. He then became known as the "Lantern Minister".

=== Gold to China ===
In 1173, Shigemori made an agreement with a ship captain name Miao Dian in Kyushu. He gave 500 tael of gold to the captain, 3000 to the Song dynasty, 1000 to the monks of Mount Yuwang, and 2000 to purchase paddy fields for the monastery, so that the monks may offer prayers for him in his future lives. Miao Dian received the gold, crossed the ocean, and took it to the land of the Song dynasty.

== Children ==
Taira no Koremori 1158-1184
