= Tierra =

Tierra may refer to:

== Astronomy ==
- Earth in the Spanish and Asturian language

== Computing and games ==
- Tierra (computer simulation), a computer simulation of life by the ecologist Thomas S. Ray
- Tierra Entertainment, now known as AGD Interactive, a non-profit game company specializing in remakes of classic adventure games by Sierra Entertainment

== Film ==
- Tierra (film), a 1996 movie by the Spanish filmmaker Julio Medem

== Music ==
- Tierra (band), a Latin R&B band from the 1970s and 1980s

=== Albums ===
- Tierra (Tierra album), a 1973 album by Tierra
- Tierra (L'Arc-en-Ciel album), a 1994 album by the Japanese rock band L'Arc-en-Ciel

== See also ==
- Tiara, a type of crown or headpiece
