= Tiara (poem) =

"Tiara" is a poem that appears in Bethlehem in Broad Daylight. Published in 1991, it is the second collection of poems by the American poet, Mark Doty, who lived through the HIV/AIDS epidemic. The poem serves as an elegy for Doty's friend, Peter Holla. Holla was a Drag queen, and the first person Doty knew who died of AIDS. The poem wrestles with the accusation that gay men living through the HIV/AIDS plague years, especially those who ultimately died of HIV/AIDS, had "asked for it" simply by being homosexual and indulging in sexual practice with other men. According to Doty, "I was filled with rage at that ridiculous notion that we invite our own oppression as a consequence of pleasure."

== Prosody ==
This poem has 45 lines, broken up into 15 three-line stanzas. According to Kennedy, Doty’s lyricism in Tiara uses enjambment and measured pacing to “transform death into something holy,” highlighting his precise control over tone and rhythm.

This poem is heterometric, with some lines written in iambic pentameter, iambic tetrameter, iambic dimeter, trochaic pentameter, and trochaic tetrameter.

== Synopsis ==
The poem begins with Peter's death in a paper tiara. In the second stanza, the speaker offers a flashback of him and Peter in a hospital room, then transitions to his funeral in the third stanza. Some people make friendly jokes related to Peter's passion for drag, then, "someone said that he asked for it," initiating the theme of gay men deserving death by HIV/AIDS due to their having intimate homosexual relations. This statement triggers a series of abstract images where the speaker imagines a heaven where men lie peacefully on the grass while horses walk through an orchard. All the while, the speaker muses on the nature of creation and mortal pleasure.
