= Robert Taira =

American businessman (1923–2003)

Robert Taira (November 5, 1923 in Hilo, Hawaii – May 29, 2003 in Torrance, California) was the founder of King's Hawaiian bakery.

== Biography ==
Taira was born and raised in Hilo, the ninth of eleven children of Okinawan immigrants.

He served in the U.S. Army as a translator during the occupation of Japan after World War II. He thought that as a result of the occupation, Japan's insular culture would become more receptive to Western culture and Western goods, and began to dream about opening various businesses in Japan. He considered clothing and jewelry, but finally decided to open a Western-style bakery. After his discharge from the Army, Taira attended baking schools in Hilo and Chicago, but was unable to return to Japan as planned when the Korean War broke out in 1950 and Japan closed its borders to regular civilians. Instead, he opened Robert's Bakery that year in his hometown of Hilo.

Taira initially specialized in baking fine cakes, while exploring other baked goods in his spare time. Like many children in Hawaii, Taira had enjoyed Portuguese sweet bread while growing up, but knew it was derisively called "stone bread" because of its notorious tendency to turn hard as a rock within one day. This meant it had to be purchased from a local bakery and immediately eaten fresh from the oven. His big break came when he succeeded in tweaking the recipe to extend the bread's short shelf life, while maintaining its cake-like flavor and texture. He transformed it into a shelf-stable product that could be mass-produced, distributed to and conveniently sold in regular supermarkets, and eaten by consumers at their leisure.

Taira moved his bakery to King Street in Honolulu in 1963 and renamed it after that street. His sweet bread recipe, branded as Hawaiian bread, became extremely popular in Hawaii and then the entire West Coast of the United States. After many years of success he moved his business to the mainland United States, building a bakery in Torrance, California in 1977. It is one of the largest bakeries in the South Bay area. By the 1980s his bakery grossed US$20 million annually.

Although he was now leading a large-scale industrial bakery, Taira remained a pastry chef at heart. In 1988, he opened King's Hawaiian Bakery and Restaurant in Torrance, which still sells a much broader range of baked goods beyond Hawaiian bread.

His family now owns and operates both his industrial bakery as well as his regular bakery and restaurant. Taira’s son, Mark Taira, took over the operations of the company in 1983.
