= Taira no Takakiyo =

Taira no Takakiyo (平高清/ Taira no Rokudai 平六代, 1173 – March 3, 1199) was a member of the ruling Taira clan from the late Heian period to the early Kamakura period. He was the son of Taira no Koremori and grandson of Taira no Kiyomori.

== Life ==
He was given the childhood name, “Rokudai” (meaning sixth generation in Japanese), as he was the sixth direct descendant of Taira no Masamori. He was also referred to as Rokudaimaru. His real name was Takakiyo, as recorded in the Koya Shunjuu Henen Shuuroku, a written historical chronicle of Koya Mountain. However, “The Tale of Heike” referred to him as Rokudai, thus he is generally referred to as such.

In 1183, the Taira clan had made the decision to flee the Kyoto before the Minamoto no Yoshinaka led attack on the capital. Rokudai's mother (Taira no Koremori's wife), who was very much comfortable in the capital, could not tolerate the thought of leaving the capital and escaping. Therefore, Koremori left his wife and children in the capital and fled with the rest of the Taira clan to the western part of Japan. Koremori asked his wife to look after his children and that she ought to remarry should she wish to. Rokudai and his mother hid in Shobudani, Wakayama, north of a mountain temple called Daikakuji. However, in December 1185, shortly after the demise of the Taira clan, a search led by Hojo Tokimasa led to the discovery and subsequent arrest of Rokudai. As he was the last surviving male member of the Taira clan, he was sent to be executed and have his head sent to Kamakura. The great monk Mongaku, feeling sorry for the poor child, rode to the capital, Kamakura, and successfully pleaded mercy and that Rokudai placed in his custody. Mongaku then raced to Senbon-no-matsubara, the site of the supposed execution and delivered the letter of clemency to the executioner. It is commonly thought that Rokudai's mother, after the death of Koremori, remarried Minamoto no Yoritomo's trusted confidant Yoshida Tsunefusa to help spare the life of her precious son.

In 1189, Rokudai cuts off his hair and represents Myokaku. In 1194, making a request through Ooe no Hirotomo, Rokudai was able to speak to Minamoto no Yoritomo and tells him that he is escaping treachery and is becoming a monk. However, upon seeing Rokudai's wise plan, Yoritomo began feeling a sense of danger, but did not follow his intuition and allowed Rokudai to enter monkhood and appointed him to a special position at a temple.

Rokudai intensively trained as a monk by travelling across the country. He first went to Koya Mountain, where his father had spent a considerable amount of time, in an attempt to retrace his father's footsteps.

In 1199, Yoritomo died, and Rokudai was arrested at his home in Nijo Inokuma, and exiled to Oki province. He is charged of treason, for planning an attack (known as the Incident at Sansaemon) on Minamoto no Yoriie, son of the former shogun. A few months later he was executed at Tagoshi River.
