= Taira clan =

Major Japanese clan of samurai

Taira 平氏
- Mon: Agehachō, the Swallowtail butterfly
- Home province: Hitachi Province, Ise Province
- Parent house: Imperial House of Japan (Emperor Kanmu)
- Titles: Various
- Founder: Taira no Takamochi
- Final ruler: Taira no Munemori
- Founding year: c. 825
- Cadet branches: Hōjō; Chiba; Miura; Nagao; Uchima; Tajiri; Hatakeyama; Oda; Tanegashima others

The Taira (平; Japanese pronunciation: [tä́ì.ɾä̀] (Note: The clan name is pronounced like this with an accent. The common noun and adjectival noun, spelt 平ら, that the name derives from, is pronounced [tä̀í.ɾä́] without an accent.)) was one of the four most important clans that dominated Japanese politics during the Heian period of Japanese history, the others being the Minamoto, the Fujiwara, and the Tachibana. The clan is divided into four major groups, named after the emperors they descended from: Kanmu Heishi, Ninmyō Heishi, Montoku Heishi, and Kōkō Heishi, the most influential of which was the Kanmu Heishi line.

In the twilight of the Heian period, the Taira controlled the boy emperor Antoku (himself the grandson of the powerful Kugyō Taira no Kiyomori) and had effectively dominated the Imperial capital of Heian. However, they were opposed by their rivals the Minamoto clan (the Genji), which culminated in the Genpei War (1180–1185 AD). The five-year-long war concluded with a decisive Taira defeat in the naval Battle of Dan-no-Ura, which resulted in the deaths of Antoku and Taira leaders. Following the war, the victorious Minamoto established Japan's first shogunate in Kamakura. The name "Genpei" comes from alternate readings of the kanji "Minamoto" (源 Gen) and "Taira" (平 Hei).

The clan is commonly referred to as Heishi (平氏; [hé̞ì.ɕì, hé̞è̞-]; lit. 'Taira clan') or Heike (平家; [hé̞ì.kè̞, hé̞è̞-]; lit. 'House of Taira'), using the character for Taira (平)'s on'yomi hei, while shi (氏) means "clan", and ke (家) means "house" or "extended family". The clan is the namesake of The Tale of the Heike, an epic account of the Genpei War.

== History ==
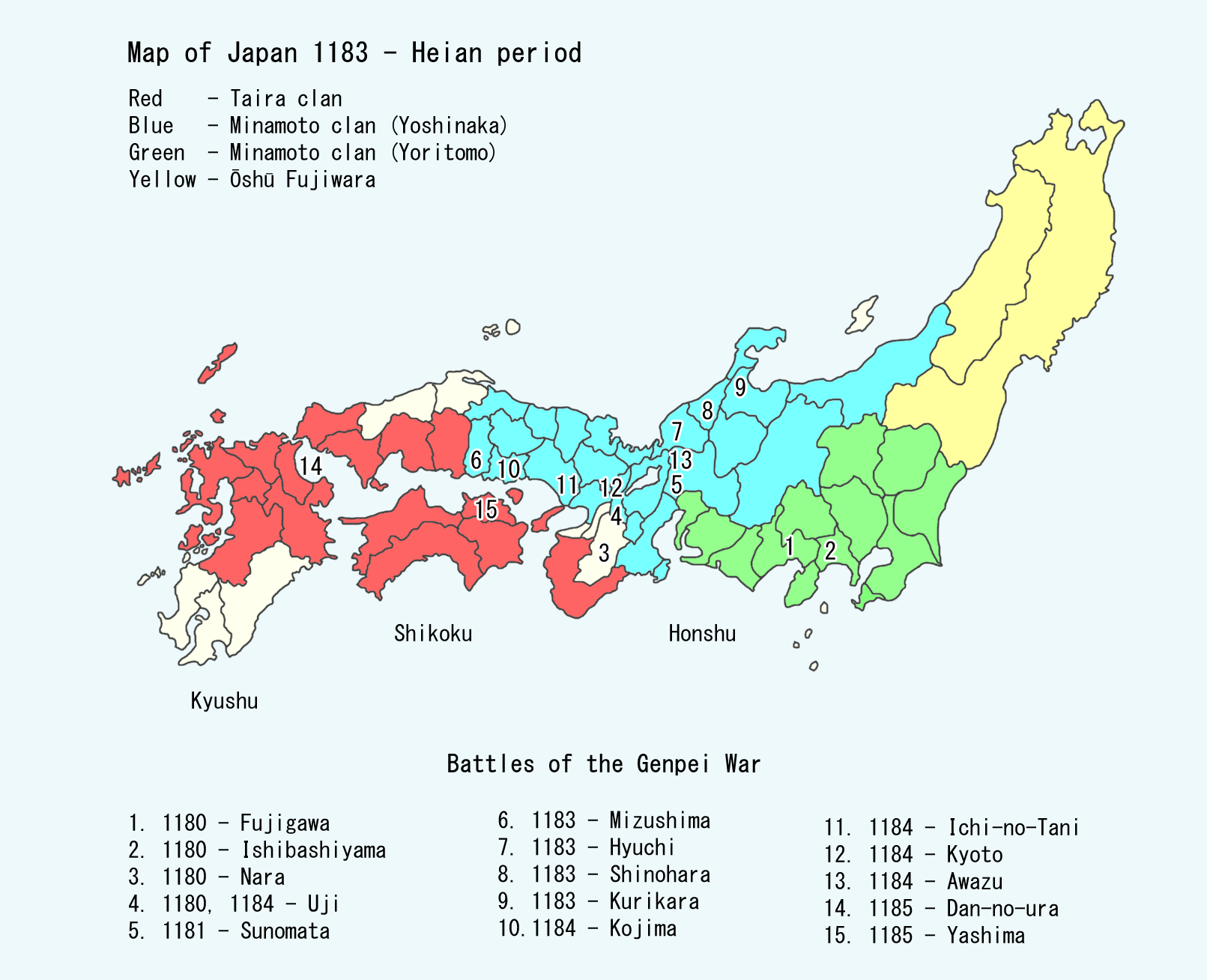
The domain of the Taira clan in Japan (1183)

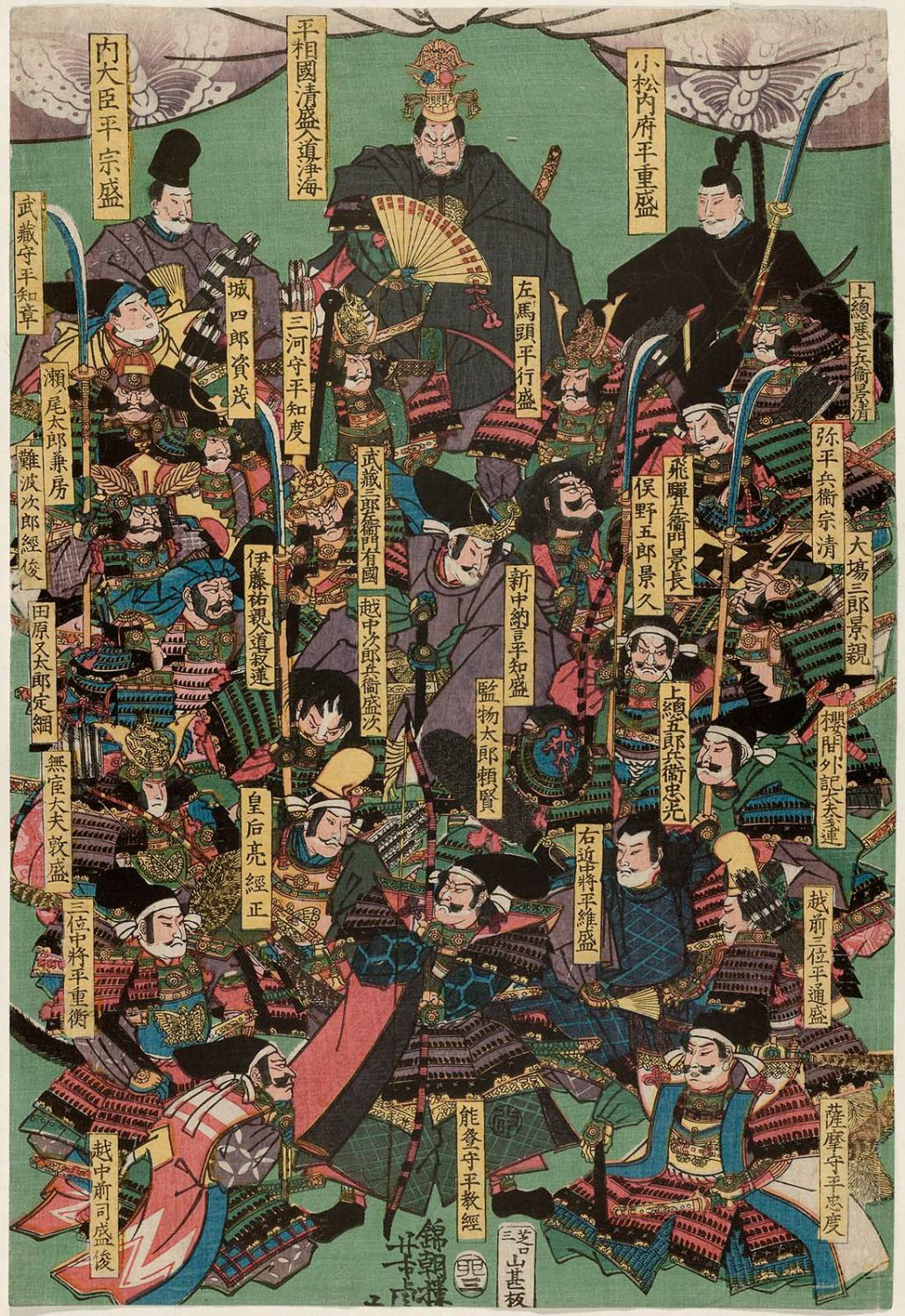
Warriors of the Taira clan by Utagawa Yoshitora

Along with the Minamoto, Taira was one of the honorary surnames given by the emperors of the Heian period (794–1185) to their children and grandchildren who were not considered eligible for the throne.

The clan was founded when the Imperial Court grew too large, and the emperor ordered that the descendants of previous emperors from several generations ago would no longer be princes but would instead be given noble surnames and ranks. The decision became applicable during the reign of Emperor Kanmu (782–805) and thus, together with the Minamoto clan, the Taira clan was born.

Some grandchildren of Emperor Kanmu were the first to bear the name of Taira, after 825. Later, descendants of Emperor Ninmyō, Emperor Montoku and Emperor Koko also received the surname. The specific hereditary lines of these emperors are referred to by the posthumous name of the emperor followed by Heishi, for example Kanmu Heishi.

The Kanmu Heishi line has two major branches. One was founded in 889 by Taira no Takamochi (great-grandson of the 50th Emperor Kanmu, who reigned from 781 to 806) and proved to be the strongest and most dominant line during the Heian period. A great-grandson of Takamochi, Taira no Korehira, moved to Ise Province (currently part of Mie Prefecture) and established an important Daimyo dynasty. Masamori, his grandson; and Tadamori, his great-grandson, became loyal supporters of Emperor Shirakawa and Emperor Toba, respectively. Later, Tadamori's son, Taira no Kiyomori, created what was considered the first samurai government in the history of Japan.

Taira no Kiyomori, son and heir of Tadamori, rose to the position of Daijō Daijin (great Minister of State), after his victories in the Hōgen Rebellion (1156) and the Heiji Rebellion (1160). Kiyomori succeeded in enthroning his youngest grandson as Emperor Antoku in 1180, an act that led to the Genpei War (Genpei no Sōran, 1180–1185). The last leader of the Kanmu Heishi bloodline was eventually destroyed by Minamoto no Yoritomo's armies at the Battle of Dan-no-ura, the last battle of the Genpei War. This story is told in the Heike Monogatari.

This branch of the Kanmu Heishi had many collateral branches, including Hōjō, Chiba, Miura and Hatakeyama.

The other major branch of Kanmu Heishi was founded by Takamune-ō (804–867), the eldest son of Prince Imperial Kazurahara and grandson of Emperor Kanmu, who received the title of Taira no Ason in the year 825. Members of this branch served as middle-class kuge in the Imperial Court of Kyoto.

The Oda clan at the time of Oda Nobunaga (1534–1582) also claimed Taira descent, they were descendants of Taira no Chikazane, grandson of Taira no Shigemori (1138–1179).

== Genpei War ==
During the Heiji Rebellion (1160), the Seiwa Genji leader, Minamoto no Yoshitomo, died in battle. Taira no Kiyomori gained power in Kyoto forging alliances with retired emperors Shirakawa and Toba. Kiyomori sent Minamoto no Yoritomo (1147–1199), the third son of Yoshitomo, into exile. In 1180, Yoritomo organized a large-scale rebellion against the rule of the Taira (the Genpei War or Taira-Minamoto War), culminated with the destruction of the Taira by the Minamoto clan and the subjugation of eastern Japan in five years. In 1192, Minamoto no Yoritomo received the title shogun and created the first bakufu based in Kamakura (Kanagawa Prefecture).

== Branches ==
The Taira clan had four main branches:

- Taira Kanmu (Kanmu Heishi, 桓武平氏) – descended from the princes, children of 50th Emperor Kanmu.
- Taira Nimmyō (Nimmyō Heishi, 仁明平氏) – descended from the princes, grandchildren of the 54th Emperor Nimmyō's lineage.
- Taira Montoku (Montoku Heishi, 文徳平氏) – descended from princes, children of 55th Emperor Montoku.
- Taira Kōkō (Kōkō Heishi, 光孝平氏) – descended from the princes, grandchildren of the 58th Emperor Kōkō's lineage.

== Clan members ==
These were important members of the Taira clan.

- Taira no Masakado (903–940)
- Taira no Kiyomori (1118–1181)
- Taira no Shigemori (1138–1179)
- Taira no Tadanori (1144–1184)
- Taira no Munemori (1147–1185)
- Taira no Tomomori (1152–1185)
- Taira no Shigehira (1158–1185)
- Taira no Takakiyo (1173–1199)

== Mon of the Taira ==
The mon (crest, emblem) of the Taira clan is an Agehanochō (揚羽蝶, Swallowtail butterfly) with raised wings.

== Gallery ==
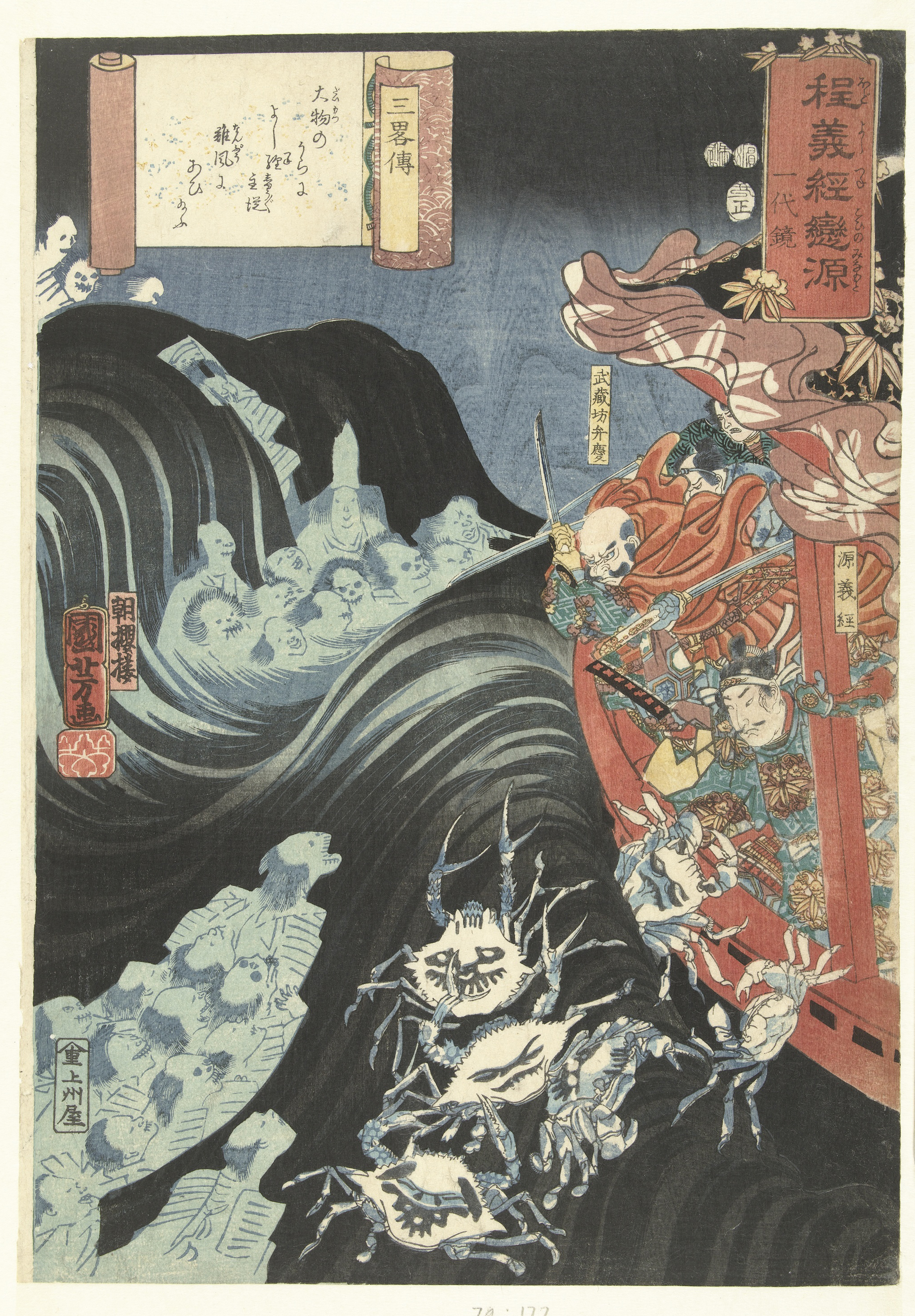
Yoshitsune and Benkei defending themselves in their boat during a storm created by the ghosts of conquered Taira warriors (by Utagawa Kuniyoshi)

== See also ==
- Japanese clans
- Japanese name
- Taira no Masakado
- The Heike Story (anime)
