= Atsumori (play) =

Japanese Noh play by Zeami Motokiyo

敦盛
- Written by: Zeami Motokiyo
- Category: 2nd—shura mono
- Characters: shite Mower/Atsumori waki Renshō/Rensei kyogen Mower's companion
- Place: Suma-ku, Kobe
- Time: 14th-15th Century
- Sources: Heike monogatari Genji monogatari Ise monogatari Kokinshū

Atsumori (敦盛, Atsumori) is a Japanese Noh play by Zeami Motokiyo which focuses on Taira no Atsumori, a young samurai who was killed in the Genpei War, and his killer, Kumagai Naozane. Atsumori's death is portrayed tragically in the Heike monogatari (Tale of the Heike), from which this and many other works stem.

== Background ==
Atsumori, roughly 16 years old at the time of the battle of Ichi-no-Tani (1184), was killed by the Minamoto warrior Kumagai Naozane. In the Heike monogatari and many works derived from it, this is focused upon as a particularly tragic episode. Atsumori is also, like many of his Taira brethren, portrayed as a courtier and poet, not truly prepared for battle. He is said to have carried a flute into battle, evidence of his peaceful, courtly nature as well as his youth and naïveté. Kumagai also notes that none of his fellow Genji (Minamoto) warriors were cultivated to a point where they would ride into battle with a flute. Royall Tyler's analysis, preceding his translation of the play, focuses on the contrasts between Atsumori, the young, peaceful courtier and flute player, and Kumagai, the older seasoned warrior.

== Plot ==
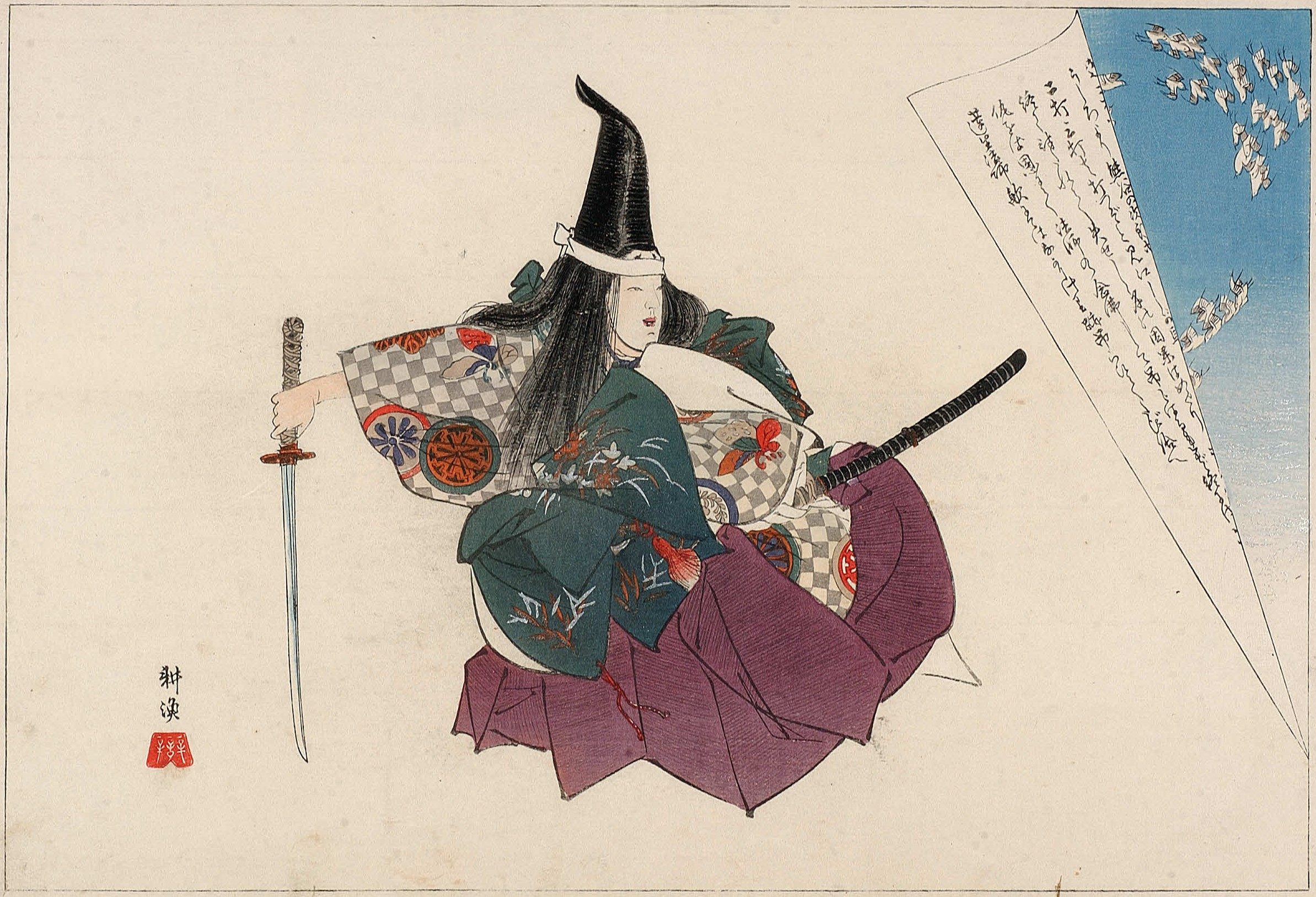
Scene from the Noh play print by Kogyo Tsukioka

The Noh play takes place some years after the end of the Genpei War. It is an example of the dream or mugen genre of Noh, although it differs slightly in that the ghost is usually unrelated to the person who sees it. The ghost of Atsumori, disguised as a grass cutter, is the shite role, and Kumagai, having become a monk and changed his name to Renshō (or Rensei), is played by the waki.

The play begins with Renshō's arrival at Ichi-no-Tani, also known as Suma, a location which features prominently in a number of classic texts, and thus has many layers of significance within the Noh; references are made throughout the play to other events that took place there, in particular those of the Genji monogatari and Ise monogatari. The monk seeks to ask forgiveness from Atsumori, and to calm his spirit. There he meets a flute-playing youth and his companions; he speaks with them briefly about fluting and about Atsumori before the youth reveals that he has a connection to Atsumori, and the first act ends.

Between the two acts, there is a kyōgen interlude, as is quite common and traditional in Noh. A kyōgen performer, playing an anonymous villager, speaks with Renshō and relates to the audience the background of the story of Atsumori, Kumagai and the battle of Ichi-no-tani.

The second act begins as the first one ended, with Renshō reciting prayers for Atsumori, who now makes his appearance. The actor who played the youth in the first act has now changed costume and plays Atsumori; this is a very common device in the most standard Noh plays, and it is implied that the youth earlier was Atsumori's ghost in disguise. Atsumori (along with the chorus chanting for him) relates his tragic story from his perspective, re-enacting it in dance form. The play then ends with Renshō refusing to re-enact his role in Atsumori's death; the ghost declares that Renshō is not his enemy, and asks that the monk pray for his release. (Tied to the mortal realm by the emotional power of his death, Atsumori's ghost has been unable to move on.)

== Famous verse ==
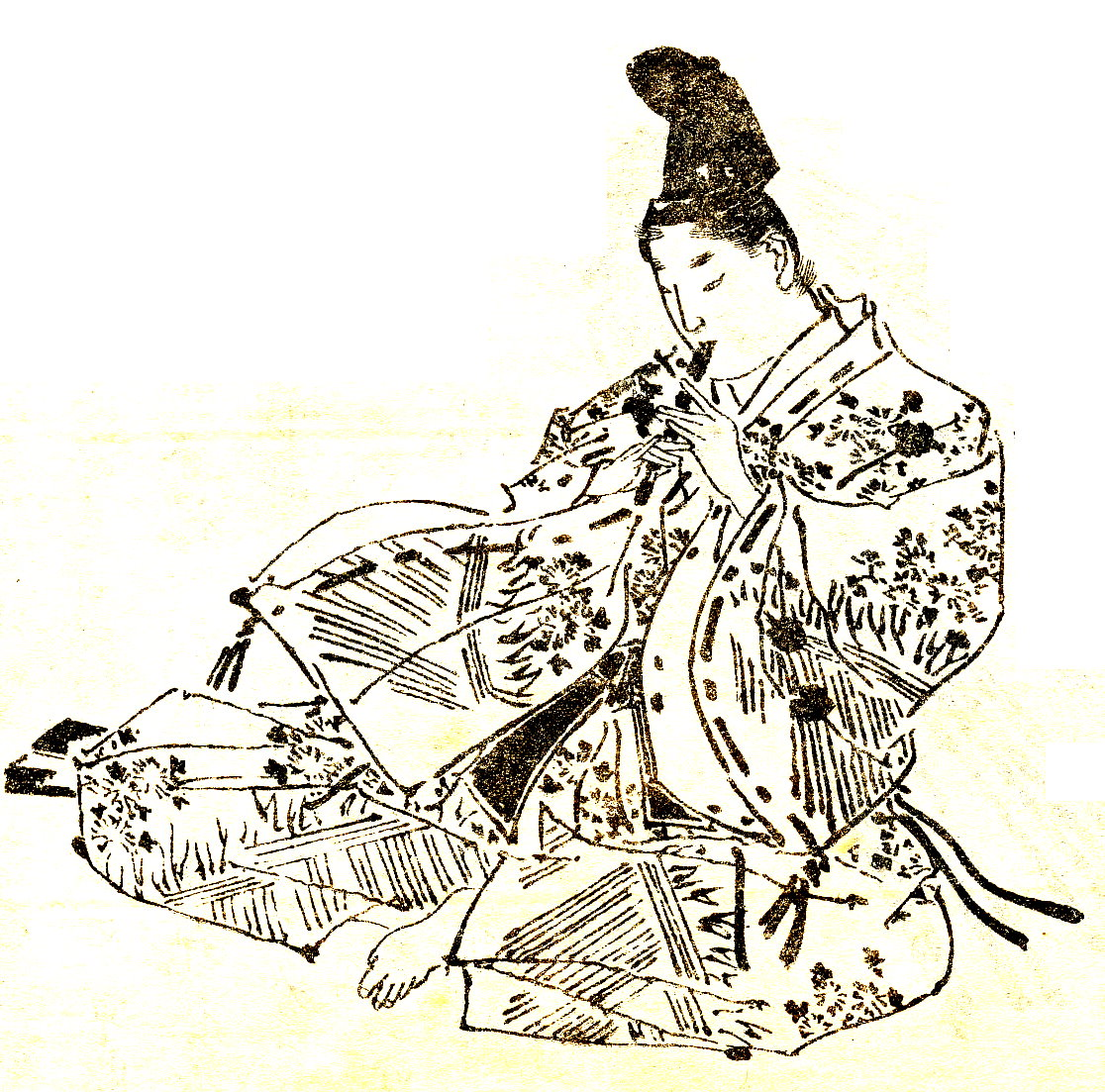
Atsumori playing the flute drawn by Kikuchi Yosai.

The Kōwakamai (幸若舞) version of Atsumori (not the Noh play) contains the following verse:

思へばこの世は常の住み家にあらず
草葉に置く白露、水に宿る月よりなほあやし
金谷に花を詠じ、榮花は先立つて無常の風に誘はるる
南楼の月を弄ぶ輩も 月に先立つて有為の雲にかくれり
人間五十年、化天のうちを比ぶれば、夢幻の如くなり
一度生を享け、滅せぬもののあるべきか
これを菩提の種と思ひ定めざらんは、口惜しかりき次第ぞ

Translation:

If you think about it, this world is not for us to inhabit forever:
It is more transient than dewdrops on blades of grass, or the moon reflected in the water.
After reciting the poetry of the flower at Kanaya, all glory is now left with the wind of impermanence.
Those who leisurely played with the moon in the southern tower are now shrouded in the cloud of Saṅkhāra [behind the moon].
50 year of a human life: compared with the life in Geten, they are [so short as to be] but a dream and illusion.
Is there anything at all that, once given life, won't perish?
Unless you consider this a seed of awakening [bodhi], you will regret the truth of this.

It is a very famous verse known to be often sung by Oda Nobunaga. Geten (化天, Gerakuten 化楽天, or Nirmaannarati) is an imaginary world of greed and desire in Buddhism. According to scriptures, a day in Geten is equal to a year in our world and an inhabitant of Geten lives 8,000 years.

== See also ==
- Ikuta Atsumori (also known as Ikuta) – a related Noh play centering on Atsumori.
- Tadanori – a related Noh play centering on another Taira killed in the same battle.
- Ichinotani Futaba Gunki – a jōruri and kabuki play which relates much the same events.
