= Ikuta Atsumori =

生田敦盛
- Written by: Konparu Zenpō
- Category: 2nd—shura mono
- Characters: shite Atsumori waki Monk kokata Atsumori's son
- Place: Kamo Shrine (Kyoto), Ikuta Shrine (Kobe)
- Time: end of 12th Century
- Sources: Heike monogatari
- Schools: all except Kita

Ikuta Atsumori (生田敦盛), sometimes known simply as Ikuta, is one of many Noh plays derived from the story of Taira no Atsumori, a young Taira clan samurai who was killed in the 1184 battle of Ichi-no-Tani. Taking place largely at Ikuta Shrine, near the scene of the battle, it centers on Atsumori's fictional son, who seeks to meet his father's ghost.

== Plot summary ==
A monk opens the play, introducing himself as a disciple of famous priest Hōnen Shōnin, and explaining how Hōnen once found a baby boy in a box at the Kamo Shrine in Kyoto. The monk says that Honen raised the boy, and, that many years later, a young woman came forth revealing herself to be the boy's mother, and explaining that his father was Taira no Atsumori. As the boy now longed to see his father's face, Hōnen suggested that he should go to Kamo and pray there for a week.

The monk concludes his introduction by explaining that this is the last day of that week, and that he has come with the boy to Kamo once again, to pray. The boy then tells the monk that he had a dream while praying, in which a voice told him to go to Ikuta Shrine in order to see his father.

Traveling to Ikuta, the pair come upon a small hut, where they decide to ask to spend the night. The man in the hut explains that he is the ghost of Atsumori. Through the intervention of the Kamo kami, Atsumori explains, he has been granted by Yama, the lord of death, a brief opportunity to appear here in the mortal world, to meet his son. He regales his son with the tale of the battle of Ichi-no-tani, in which he was killed. A messenger of Yama then appears, and takes Atsumori with him, back to the realm of the shura, the hell of constant battle.

== Taira no Atsumori ==
Atsumori is a complex character. He is a great warrior from the Taira family but he also shows a sensitive side with his son. His philosophy on life also seems to contrast during the story. Before the meeting of father and son, Atsumori recites the five attributes of "beauty, perception, knowledge, motion, consciousness". He talks about how the body is weak and it is the soul that guards it from corruption. Yet, when he meets his son, he suddenly becomes concerned about the ratty garments he wears. The idea being that someone who comes from the Taira line should have a better presentation. When talking to his son, he has great pride in telling the story of the Taira family at its peak. As soon as he speaks of the downfall of the great Taira family, he is called back to Hell and just like the Taira family, he fades away.

== Subtext of play ==
The play expresses the pain in loss of war. When the late father Atsumori, describes his son, he talks about him with such joy. He uses simile to compare his son to a flower. He compares his son to an earthly object in order to allow audiences to feel privileged that they lived in a generation in which they could feel grateful that they weren't in war.

The play also goes on to detail Atsumori's descent, after being briefly reconnected with his son, back into the realm of Shuma, a realm of constant battle. This further warns against the consequence and sadness of war.

== Filial Piety ==
Filial piety is a main theme in this story. Even though Atsumori and his son had never met, they were brought together by a deep spiritual connection. The boy’s prayers and longing for his father was so powerful that the gods allowed Atsumori to briefly leave Hell and meet his son. The following excerpt really describes the instant connection between father and son during their meeting:
And lightly he ran,
Plucked at the warrior’s sleeve,
And though his tears might seem like the long woe
Of nightingales that weep,
Yet were they tears of meeting-joy,
Or happiness too great for human heart.

== See also ==
- Heike monogatari - classical epic relating the events on which this and many other works have been derived.
- Atsumori - another Noh play centering on Atsumori.
