= Ikuta =

Ikuta may refer to:

- Ikuta Shrine, Japanese shrine
- Ikuta Station, Japanese railroad station
- Ikuta Atsumori, Japanese noh play

== People ==
- Chōkō Ikuta (生田 長江; 1882-1936), translator, literary critic
- Erina Ikuta (生田 衣梨奈; born 1997), Japanese idol singer (Morning Musume)
- Erika Ikuta (生田 絵梨花; born 1997), Japanese actress and former idol singer (Nogizaka46)
- Masaharu Ikuta (生田 正治; born 1935), Japanese businessman
- Sandra Segal Ikuta, American federal judge
- Toma Ikuta (生田 斗真; born 1984), Japanese actor
- Yasuhiro Ikuta (生田 康宏; born 1979), Japanese alpine skier
- Lilas Ikuta (幾田 りら; born 2000), Japanese singer (Yoasobi)
