= Konparu Zenpō =

Japanese Noh actor and playwright

Konparu Zenpō (金春 禅鳳; 1454–1520?) was a Japanese Noh actor and playwright of the Konparu school. He was the grandson of Konparu Zenchiku. Zenpō's plays were more popular and dramatic, novel and crowd-pleasing with large casts and more elaborate effects and sets, than the plays of his grandfather's, or his great-grandfather Zeami's, although he did have an appreciation of yugen and wabi (Zenpō was a pupil of Shuko and quoted him as saying "The moon not glimpsed through rifts in clouds holds no interest").

== Plays ==
- Arashiyama (嵐山)
- Hatsuyuki ("Virgin Snow" or "First Snow"; 初雪; written in the yugen Zenchiku style)
- Ikarikazuki ("The Anchor Draping"; 碇潜)
- Ikkaku sennin ("One-Horned Wizard"; 一角仙人; this Noh inspired the kabuki play Narukami)
- Ikuta Atsumori (生田敦盛)
- Kamo (賀茂)
- Tōbōsaku (東方朔)

== Treatises ==
- Mōtanshichinshō (1455)
