= Leslie Clio =

German singer and songwriter

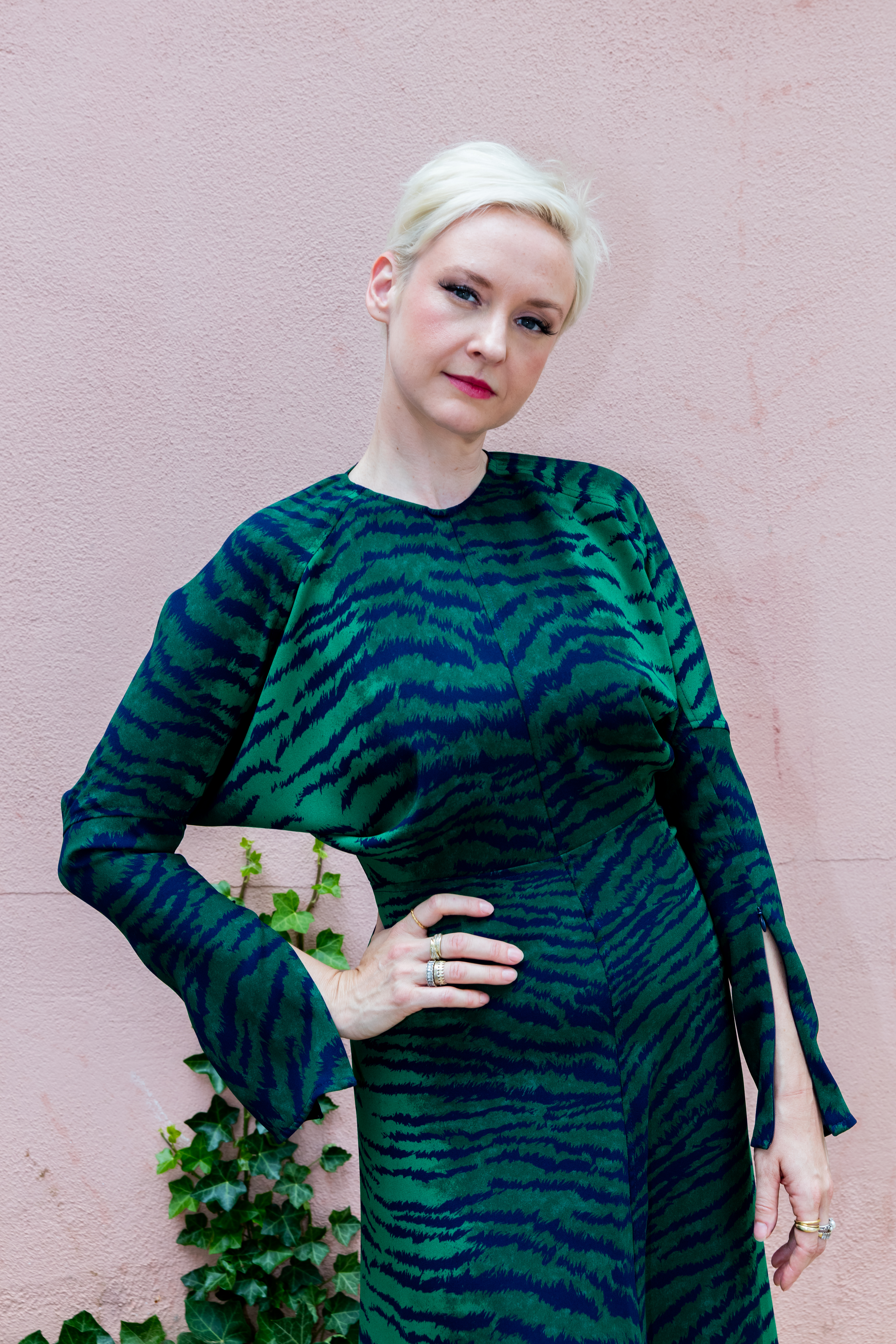
- Clio in 2025.

Background information
- Born: 16 August 1986 (age 39); Hamburg, West Germany
- Origin: Berlin, Germany
- Genres: Pop; soul pop
- Occupations: Singer-songwriter, producer, director
- Years active: 2012–present
- Labels: Vertigo, Embassy Of Music, House Of Clio
- Website: www.leslieclio.com

Leslie Clio (born 16 August 1986) is a German singer songwriter, music video director, producer and entertainer.

== Career ==
In 2008, Clio moved to Berlin. In 2013, she released her first album Gladys, a retro soul pop record which got her signed to Universal Music and charted at No. 11 in the German Albums Chart. The singles "I Couldn't Care Less" and "Told You So" became instant airplay hits and earned her a nomination for an ECHO Award in the category "Best Female Artist National". She played with Keane, Marlon Roudette, Phoenix and Joss Stone on tour. Following the success of her first album, Clio released her second record Eureka (Universal Music) in spring 2015, which charted at No. 13. The first single "My Heart Ain't That Broken" became another top 50 airplay song. In 2015, Clio appeared on Shuko's record For the Love of It (2015) with the song "Heatwave" featuring Talib Kweli. She became one of the five members of the German jury for the Eurovision Song Contest 2015 in Vienna. Her third record Purple was released on 17 May 2017, and the additional acoustic EP was released in October. In 2018 she appeared on the German TV Show Sing Meinen Song. A purple deluxe edition was released in June 2018. In June 2019 she released Repeat, an EP with 6 cover songs. In 2020 she founded her own label House Of Clio. In 2021, she released the children's album HIGHFIVE! under the name KID CLIO and translated and sang the theme song for the Disney Princess 2021 campaign Ultimate Princess Celebration, originally sung by Brandy. Her fourth and self released studio album Brave New Woman was released on 4 February 2022. She was a finalist in the German edition of The Masked Singer. In 2023 she opened the Berlinale and supported Lionel Richie on his German shows. In 2024 she wrote two songs for Marianne Rosenberg's album Bunter Planet.

== Personal life ==
Leslie is vegan and a PETA activist.

== Discography ==
=== Albums ===
Title	Album details	Peak chart positions		
Title	Album details	GER	AUT	SWI
Gladys	Released: 8 February 2013; Label: Vertigo Berlin; Formats: CD, LP, digital download	11	30	22
Eureka	Released: 17 April 2015; Label: Vertigo Berlin; Formats: CD, LP, digital download	14	—	85
Purple	Released: 17 May 2017; Label: Embassy of Music; Formats: CD, LP, digital download	41	—	67
Brave New Woman	Released: 4 February 2022; Label: House of Clio, Sony Music; Formats: CD, LP, digital download	55	—	—
"—" denotes items which were not released in that country or failed to chart.

=== Singles ===
Title	Year	Peak chart positions			Album
Title	Year	GER	AUT	SWI	Album
"Told You So"	2012	41	53	—	Gladys
"I Couldn't Care Less"	2013	25	25	66	Gladys
"Twist the Knife"	2013	—	—	—	Gladys
"My Heart Ain't That Broken"	2015	57	—	—	Eureka
"Eureka"	2015	—	—	—	Eureka
"And I'm Leaving"	2017	—	—	—	Purple
"Rumours"	2018	—	—	—	Purple Deluxe Edition
"—" denotes items which were not released in that country or failed to chart.
