= Kumagai Naozane =

Japanese soldier (1141–1207 or 1208)

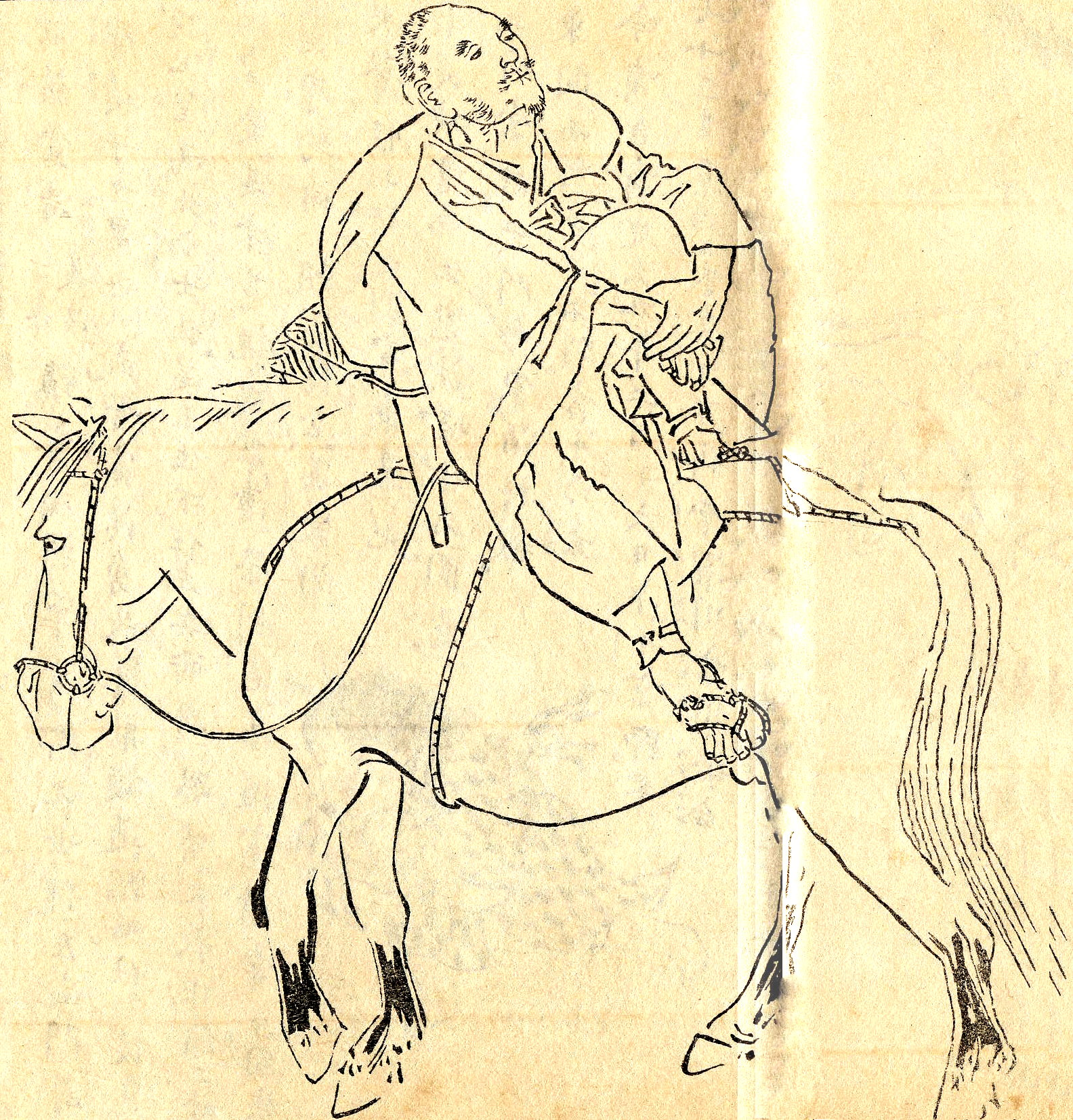
Kumagai is often depicted riding his horse backwards. Though likely more myth than historical fact, he is said to have been determined to always face towards the Western Paradise of Amida, even when riding to the east, as part of his penance and devotion.

Kumagai no Jirō Naozane (熊谷 次郎 直実) (March 24, 1141 – September 27, 1207/October 25, 1208) was a famous soldier who served the Genji (Minamoto) clan during the Heian period and Kamakura era of Japanese medieval history. Kumagai is particularly known for his exploits during the Genpei War, specifically for killing the young warrior Taira no Atsumori at the battle of Ichi-no-tani in 1184. Later in life he became a Jōdo-shū Buddhist priest, as a disciple of Hōnen. Atsumori's death and the circumstances surrounding it went on to be fictionalized and retold in numerous forms, including the Heike Monogatari epic, a number of Noh plays, and in the jōruri and kabuki theatres as well.

== Birth and origins ==
Kumagai was born in Kumagai village, in the Ōsato District of Musashi Province. He lost his father at a young age, and was raised by his maternal uncle, Hisaka Naomitsu. When Minamoto no Yoritomo first raised his army, Kumagai sided with the Taira clan (Heike). However, he soon switched allegiances to the Minamoto clan (Genji). Kumagai's most well-known battle was at Ichi no Tani, where he confronted the Heike prince, Taira no Atsumori.

== Atsumori and Ichi-no-tani ==
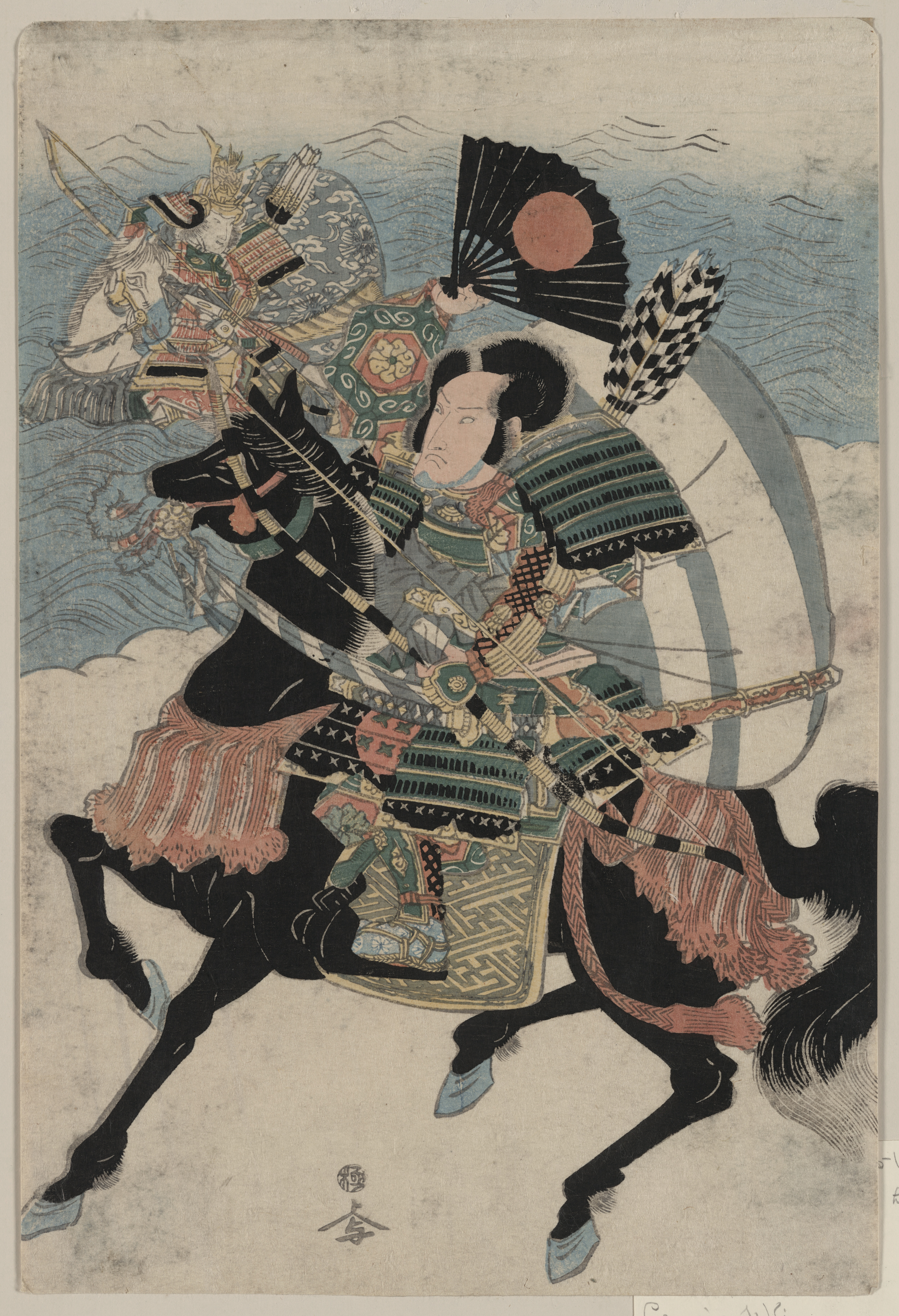
Ukiyo-e of Kumagai Naozane and Taira no Atsumori

During the battle of Ichi-no-Tani, Atsumori and Kumagai met on the beach at Suma, as the main Genji force approached and the Heike fled to their ships. As it is told in the Heike Monogotari, Kumagai caught up with Atsumori, who was fleeing on horseback. Kumagai managed to throw Atsumori from his horse and ripped off the helmet of the prone Atsumori. It was then that Kumagai realized that he had caught a young prince, based on the fine makeup and robes. Atsumori then tells Kumagai to take his head, but Kumagai hesitates because Atsumori reminded him of his own son, roughly the same age. Kumagai wished to spare Atsumori's life, due to his kind nature, but saw that his fellow Genji soldiers were approaching. Tearfully, he promises to recite prayers to Atsumori, and cuts off his head.

The Noh play Atsumori describes Atsumori's death as follows:

Overwhelmed by compassion, Naozane could not find a place to strike. His senses reeled, his wits forsook him, and he was scarcely conscious of his surroundings. But matters could not go on like that forever: in tears, he took the head.

After taking the time to look through Atsumori's belongings, he found a certain flute, known as the "Saeda" (Little Branch). Discovering that the flute was given to Taira no Tadamori by Emperor Toba, and later passed down to Atsumori, he reportedly felt even more sadness and regret for his actions. That morning, Kumagai had heard someone playing the flute with skill outside the enemy camp, and he now realized that that flute player may have been Atsumori.

== Priesthood ==
Later in life, Kumagai remained remorseful over the people he killed in his career as a soldier, and grew discontented with following Minamoto no Yoritomo, so he visited the Pure Land Buddhist Hōnen and explained that he was concerned with the afterlife. Hōnen told him that he need only recite the name of Amida Buddha, the nembutsu, and that regardless of his former life, he would be reborn in the Pure Land. Kumagai was said to have burst into tears, fearing that Hōnen would instruct him to "cut off his hands and feet or give up his life" in order to find salvation from his sins.

From there, Kumagai became a close follower of Hōnen and Jōdo-shū Buddhism, and took the ordained named Rensei (蓮生). Letters are still preserved between Hōnen and Rensei, where Hōnen advises Rensei to continue reciting the nembutsu, and to look after his aging mother. Rensei later made a written vow before a statue of Amida Buddha, stating that he would strive to reach the highest rebirth in the Pure Land, as depicted in the Buddhist text, the Contemplation Sutra:

I, Rensei, on the 13th of the fifth month of 1203, do make this vow here in this place called Toba, right in front of the picture of Amida which represents his coming down to welcome those into the highest rank of the highest class. It would be such an eternal delight to be Born into the Land of Bliss [the Pure Land], even in the lowest rank of the lowest class. But according to the great Master T'ien-tai's interpretation, no one born into any but the highest of the nine ranks can come back to this vile world. In this way, I myself want to have the joy of welcoming every karmically connected sentient being to that land. But in order to be able to include the estranged as well, I have determined to attain Birth into the highest rank of all. Otherwise, I will decline to accept Birth into any rank whatsoever.

As a close disciple of Hōnen, Rensei became a popular instructor on Pure Land Buddhism and helped spread the new doctrine to others who also became Hōnen's disciples. In the summer of 1206, Rensei/Kumagai died one morning while repeating the nenbutsu over and over in front of a hung image of Amida Buddha and his attendant Bodhisattvas.
