= Purple (Leslie Clio album) =

Studio album by Leslie Clio
- Released: 17 May 2017
- Label: Embassy of Music
- Producer: Olaf Opal

Leslie Clio chronology
Eureka (2015)	Purple (2017)	Brave New Woman (2022)

Purple is the third studio album by German recording artist Leslie Clio. Released on 19 May 2017 in German-speaking Europe, it marked her debut with the Embassy of Music label following her departure from Vertigo Records. Coinciding with Clio's appearance on the fifth season of the reality television series Sing meinen Song – Das Tauschkonzert, the German adaptation of The Best Singers series, a deluxe edition of Purple is expected to be released on 25 May 2018.

== Track listing ==
Credits adapted from the liner notes of Purple.

Purple – Standard edition
No.	Title	Writer(s)	Producer(s)	Length
1.	"Lies Are Gold"	Clio; Jacob Vetter	Olaf Opal	3:56
2.	"And I'm Leaving"	Clio; Per Eklund; Sven Johansson	Opal	3:21
3.	"Game Changer"	Clio; Blair Booth	Opal	3:28
4.	"Riot"	Clio; Eklund; Johan Jones Wetterberg	Opal	5:50
5.	"Darkness Is A Filler"	Clio; Eklund; Johansson	Opal	3:56
6.	"Sad Games"	Clio; Eklund; Johansson	Opal	3:19
7.	"In And Out"	Clio; Christian Olsson	Opal	3:56
8.	"Aquarius"	Clio; Konrad Betcher; Philipp Koller	Opal	4:24
9.	"But It Ruins Me"	Clio; Johann Fanger	Opal	4:58
10.	"Walls Down"	Clio; Jacob Vetter	Opal	3:49
11.	"Fragile"	Clio; Per Eklund; Henrik Jonzon	Opal	3:19
12.	"Bad Habit" (featuring Drangsal)	Clio; Tim Roth; Max Gruber	Opal	4:06

Purple – Deluxe edition
No.	Title	Writer(s)	Producer(s)	Length
1.	"Rumors"			2:58
2.	"Lies Are Gold"	Clio; Jacob Vetter	Opal	3:56
3.	"And I'm Leaving"	Clio; Per Eklund; Sven Johansson	Opal	3:21
4.	"Game Changer"	Clio; Blair Booth	Opal	3:28
5.	"Riot"	Clio; Eklund; Johan Jones Wetterberg	Opal	5:50
6.	"Darkness Is A Filler"	Clio; Eklund; Johansson	Opal	3:56
7.	"Sad Games"	Clio; Eklund; Johansson	Opal	3:19
8.	"In And Out"	Clio; Christian Olsson	Opal	3:56
9.	"Aquarius"	Clio; Konrad Betcher; Philipp Koller	Opal	4:24
10.	"But It Ruins Me"	Clio; Johann Fanger	Opal	4:58
11.	"Walls Down"	Clio; Jacob Vetter	Opal	3:49
12.	"Fragile"	Clio; Per Eklund; Henrik Jonzon	Opal	3:19
13.	"Bad Habit" (featuring Drangsal)	Clio; Tim Roth; Max Gruber	Opal	4:06
14.	"Home"			3:21
15.	"Sister Sun Brother Moon"			3:08
16.	"Damage Done" (Acoustic Version)			3:15
17.	"I Couldn't Care Less" (Live)			2:50
18.	"Be with You" (Live)			3:44

== Charts ==
Chart (2017–18)	Peak position
German Albums (Offizielle Top 100)	41
Swiss Albums (Schweizer Hitparade)	67
