= Tadanori =

- Gender: Male

Origin
- Origin: Japanese
- Meaning: Different meanings depending on the kanji used

Tadanori (written: 忠則, 忠度, 忠教, 忠憲, or 忠礼) is a masculine Japanese given name. Notable people with the name include:

- Ishiguro Tadanori (石黒 忠悳; 1845–1941), Imperial Japanese Army officer
- Tadanori Koshino (越野 忠則; born 1966), Japanese judoka
- Kujō Tadanori (九条 忠教; 1248–1332), Japanese kugyō
- Ōkubo Tadanori (大久保 忠礼; 1842–1897), Japanese daimyō
- Taira no Tadanori (平 忠度; 1144–1184), Japanese samurai
- Torii Tadanori (鳥居 忠則; 1646–1689), Japanese daimyō
- Tadanori Usami (宇佐美 忠則), Japanese adult video director
- Tadanori Yokoo (横尾 忠則; born 1936), Japanese artist and illustrator
