= Gladys (album) =

Studio album by Leslie Clio
- Released: 8 February 2013
- Genre: Pop; soul pop
- Label: Vertigo Berlin
- Producer: Nikolai Potthoff

Leslie Clio chronology
Gladys (2013)	Eureka (2015)

Gladys is the debut studio album by German recording artist Leslie Clio. It was released by Vertigo Berlin on 8 February 2013 in German-speaking Europe.

== Track listing ==
Credits adapted from the liner notes of Gladys.

Gladys – Standard edition
No.	Title	Writer(s)	Producer(s)	Length
1.	"Told You So"	Clio; Nikolai Potthoff; Fiora Cutler	Potthoff	3:12
2.	"I Couldn't Care Less"	Clio; Potthoff; Tobias Kuhn	Potthoff	3:16
3.	"Gotta Stop Loving You"	Clio; Potthoff; Nick Whitecross	Potthoff	3:27
4.	"Island"	Clio; Potthoff	Potthoff	3:25
5.	"Sister Sun Brother Moon"	Clio; Potthoff; Richard Causon	Tikovoï	3:05
6.	"Twist the Knife"	Clio; Potthoff; Charles Grant	Potthoff	3:16
7.	"Dr Feelgood"	Clio; Potthoff; Simon Triebel	Potthoff	3:21
8.	"Let Go"	Clio; Potthoff; Natalia Jayden	Potthoff	3:41
9.	"God No More"	Clio; Potthoff	Potthoff	3:31
10.	"Melt Back"	Clio; Potthoff	Potthoff	3:34
11.	"Holding On to Say Goodbye"	Clio; Potthoff; Whitecross	Potthoff	3:53

== Charts ==
=== Weekly charts ===
Chart (2013)	Peak position
Austrian Albums (Ö3 Austria)	30
German Albums (Offizielle Top 100)	11
Swiss Albums (Schweizer Hitparade)	22
