= Eureka (Leslie Clio album) =

Studio album by Leslie Clio
- Released: 17 April 2015
- Genre: Pop; soul pop
- Label: Vertigo Berlin
- Producer: Justin Gray; Jamie Kenney; Seth Jones; Thomas Steengaard; Dimitri Tikovoï

Leslie Clio chronology
Gladys (2013)	Eureka (2015)	Purple (2017)

Eureka is the second studio album by German recording artist Leslie Clio. It was released by Vertigo Berlin on 17 April 2015 in German-speaking Europe.

== Track listing ==
Credits adapted from the liner notes of Eureka.

Eureka – Standard edition
No.	Title	Writer(s)	Producer(s)	Length
1.	"Eureka"	Clio; Thomas Steengaard	Dimitri Tikovoï; Steengaard^{[A]}	3:27
2.	"My Heart Ain't That Broken"	Clio; Justin Gray	Tikovoï; Gray^{[A]}	2:47
3.	"Be with You"	Clio; Jonas Myrin; Per Eklund	Tikovoï	3:09
4.	"All the Other Fools"	Clio; Florian Reutter	Tikovoï	3:12
5.	"Damage Done"	Clio; Tikovoï; Fiora Cutler	Tikovoï	3:13
6.	"Fuck What They Told Ya"	Clio; Janne Kask	Tikovoï	3:33
7.	"Make Things Better"	Clio; Cameron Jaymes; Seth Jones	Tikovoï; Jones^{[A]}	4:10
8.	"Changes"	Clio; Reutter; Jennifer Decilveo	Tikovoï	3:21
9.	"Falling to Pieces"	Clio; Charles Grand	Tikovoï	3:26
10.	"Bad Eyes"	Clio; Jamie Kenney	Tikovoï; Kenney^{[A]}	3:15
11.	"Only a Fool Breaks His Own Heart"	Norman Bergen; Shelly Coburn	Tikovoï	3:22
12.	"Remedy"	Clio; Myrin; Eklund	Tikovoï	3:03

Eureka – Deluxe edition
No.	Title	Length
13.	"Trying Times"	3:49
14.	"Adam"	3:15
15.	"Million Lights"	2:47
16.	"Pas Une Larme"	2:48
17.	"My Heart Ain't That Broken" (Doo Wop Version)	2:50
18.	"My Heart Ain't That Broken" (True Love Remix)	3:21

Notes

- ^{^[A]} denotes co-producer.

== Charts ==
=== Weekly charts ===
Chart (2015)	Peak position
German Albums (Offizielle Top 100)	14
Swiss Albums (Schweizer Hitparade)	85
