= Shuko =

Shūko
- Gender: Female

Origin
- Origin: Japanese
- Meaning: Different meanings depending on the kanji used

Shuko, Shūko or Shuuko (written: 周子, 修子 or 柊子) is a feminine Japanese given name. Notable people with the name include:

- Shuko (actress) (柊子; born 1991), Japanese actress and lyricist
- Shuko Akune (born 1959) American actress
- Shuko Aoyama (青山 修子; born 1987), Japanese tennis player
- Shūko Honami (本阿弥 周子; born 1950), Japanese actress

Shūkō or Shuukou (written: 修功) is a separate masculine Japanese given name, though it may also be romanized the same way. Notable people with the name include:

- Shūkō Murase (村瀬 修功; born 1964), Japanese anime director and animator

== Fictional characters ==
- Shūko Komi, a character from Komi Can't Communicate

== See also ==
- Schuko
