= Taira no Tadanori =

Taira no Tadanori (平 忠度)
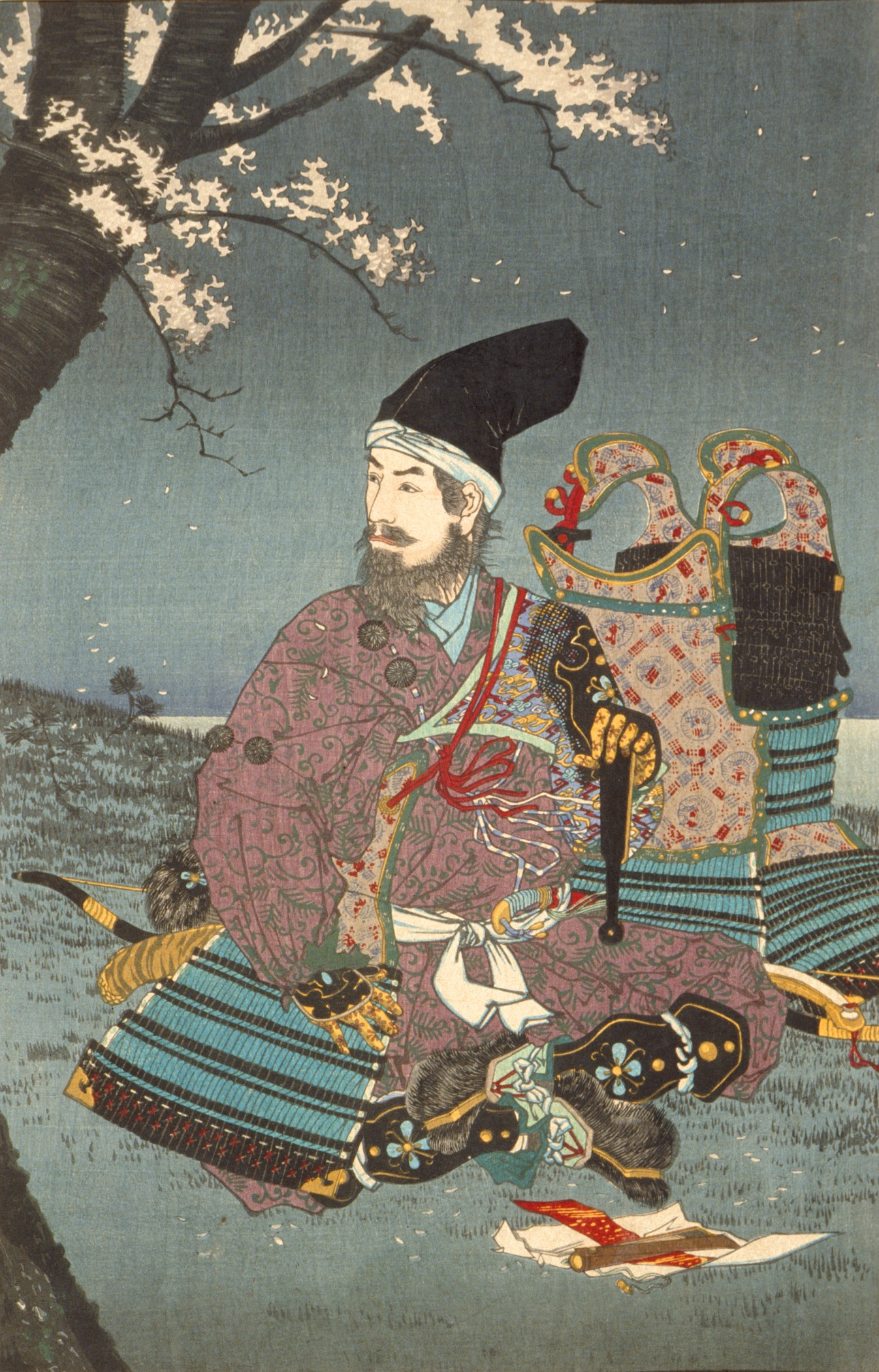
- Tadanori resting under a cherry tree by Kobayashi Kiyochika
- Born: 1144
- Died: 1184 (aged 39–40)
- Occupations: Poet and military leader

Taira no Tadanori (平 忠度) (1144–1184) was a poet and military leader of the late Heian period of Japan. He was the brother of clan head Taira no Kiyomori, and one of his generals in the Genpei War against the Minamoto.

== Career ==
Tadanori was the governor of Satsuma and a general in the Genpei War. He was also a well versed poet and a student of the famous poet Fujiwara no Shunzei.

== Genpei War ==
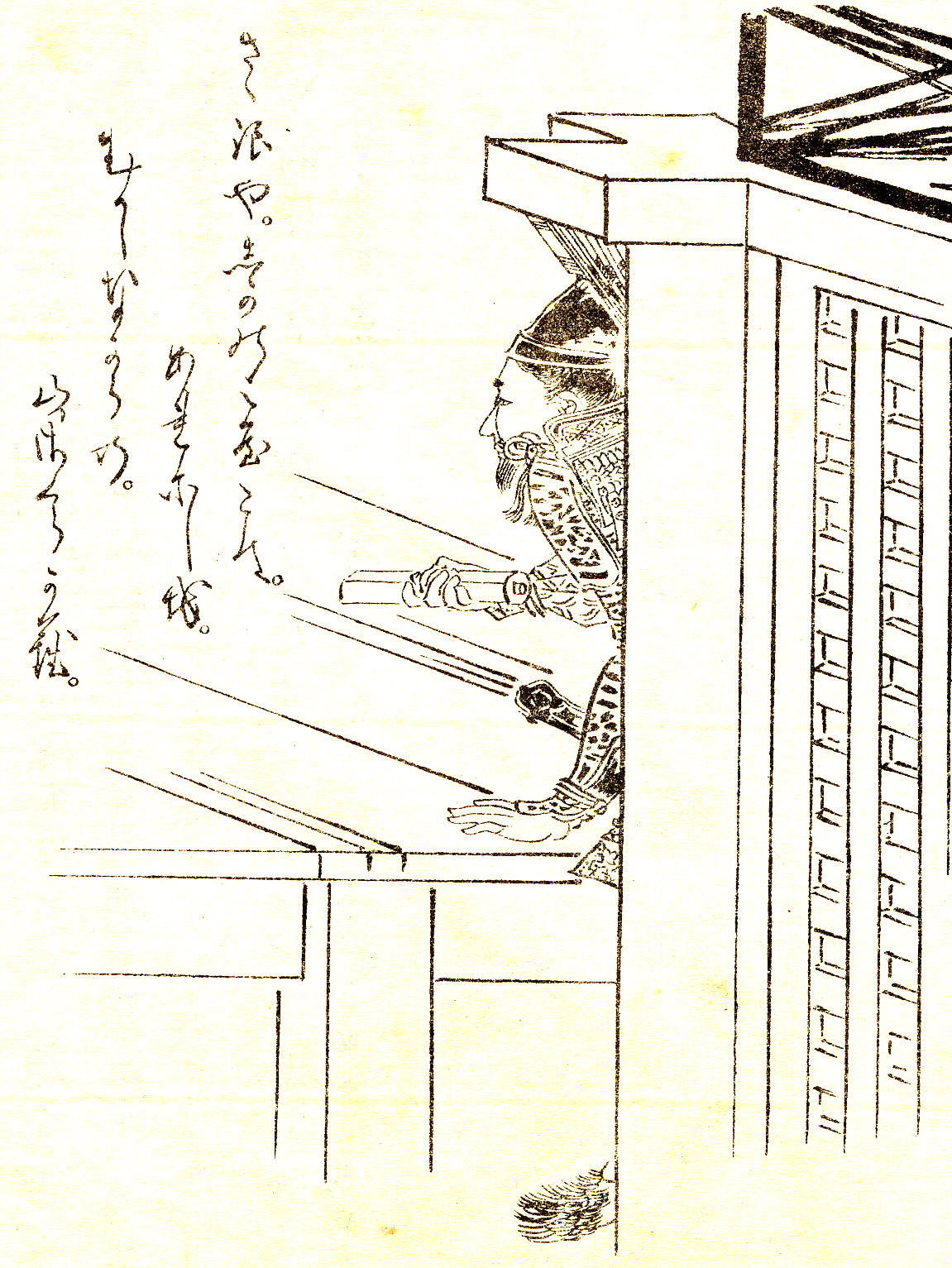
Tadanori delivering his poems by Kikuchi Yōsai

Tadanori took part in the Battle of Fujigawa of the Genpei War. He also fought against Minamoto no Yoshinaka in the Battle of Kurikara. According to the Tale of the Heike, before fleeing the capital after a loss to the Minamoto, he visited Fujiwara no Shunzei to deliver a "hundred or so" poems. Shunzei included one anonymously in the Senzaishu. The poem read:

In ruins now, the old capital Shiga by the waves,
yet the wild cherries of Naga still bloom as before.

== Death ==
He died in the Battle of Ichi-no-Tani. His body was identified by a signed poem that was fastened to his quiver. The poem read:

Evening drawing on, I'll take lodging in the shade of this tree,
and make its blossoms my host for the night.

== See also ==
- Zeami Motokiyo – playwright who wrote the Noh play Tadanori which focuses on Tadanori's spirit and his desire to have his anonymous poem attributed.
