= Taira no Atsumori =

Japanese samurai (1169–1184)

Taira no Atsumori (平 敦盛)
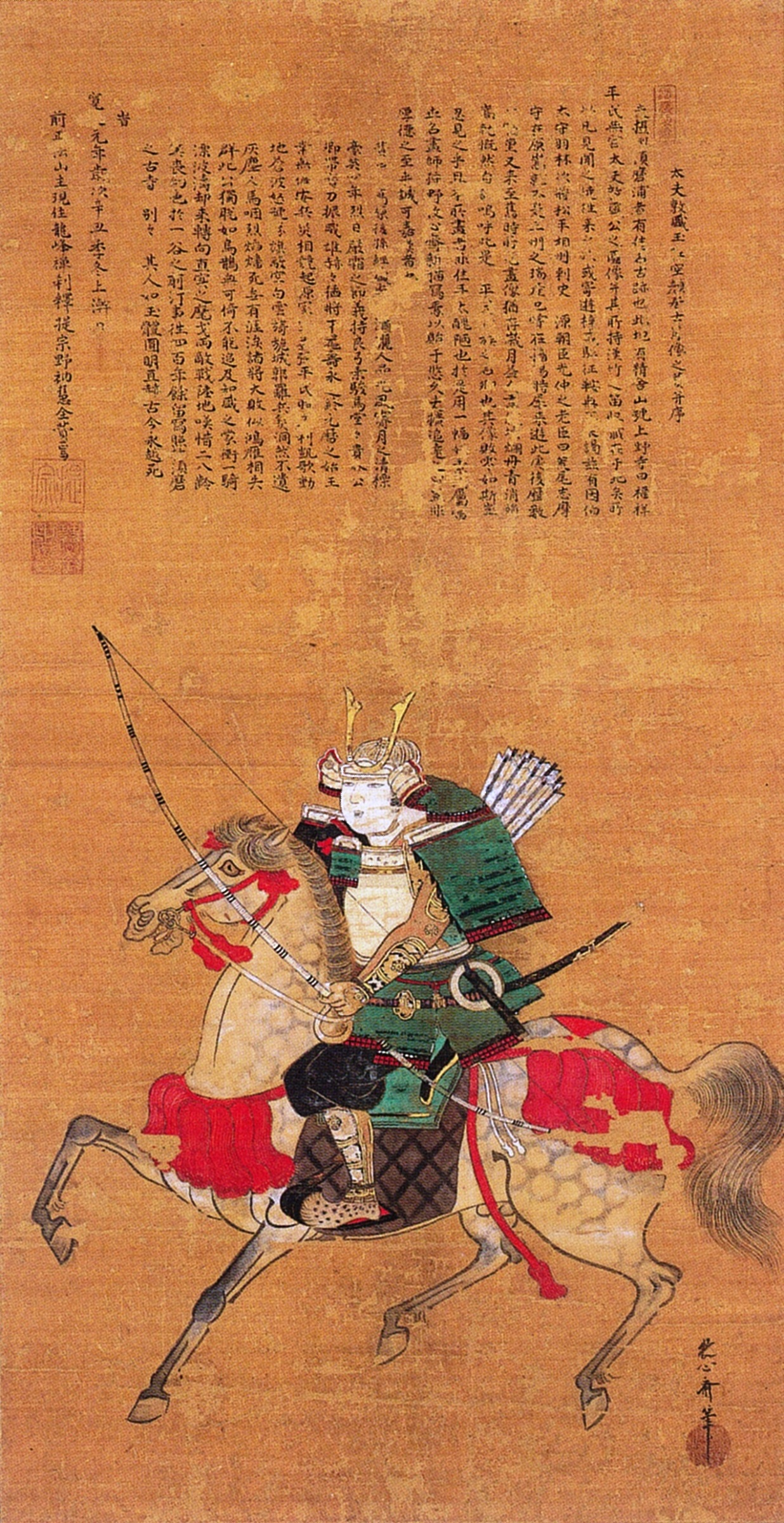
- Atsumori by Kanō Yasunobu
- Born: 1169
- Died: 1184 (aged 15-16)
- Occupation: Warrior

Taira no Atsumori (平 敦盛) (1169–1184) was a samurai of the late Heian period of Japan. He was a member of the Taira clan (Heike) who fought in the Genpei War against the Minamoto (Genji).

He is mostly known for his early death at the Battle of Ichi-no-Tani and his appearance in the epic The Tale of the Heike, in which he was killed by the remorseful warrior Kumagai Naozane. He is also the subject of the famous Noh play Atsumori.

== Career ==
Atsumori was a son of Taira no Tsunemori, a younger half-brother of the powerful lord and regent Taira no Kiyomori.

Atsumori fought as a warrior during the Genpei War. At the age of either 15 or 16, he was killed in the Battle of Ichi-no-Tani. During the battle, Atsumori engaged Kumagai Naozane, a retainer of the Minamoto, and was killed. Kumagai had a son the same age as Atsumori. Kumagai's great remorse as told in The Tale of Heike, coupled with his taking of a monk's vows, caused this otherwise obscure event to become well known for its tragedy.

== Battle of Ichi-no-Tani ==
According to The Tale of the Heike, the Taira were scattered by Yoshitsune's attack from the Ichi-no-Tani cliff. Kumagai no Jirō Naozane, while scanning the beach for fleeing soldiers, spotted the young Atsumori swimming towards the fleeing vessels.

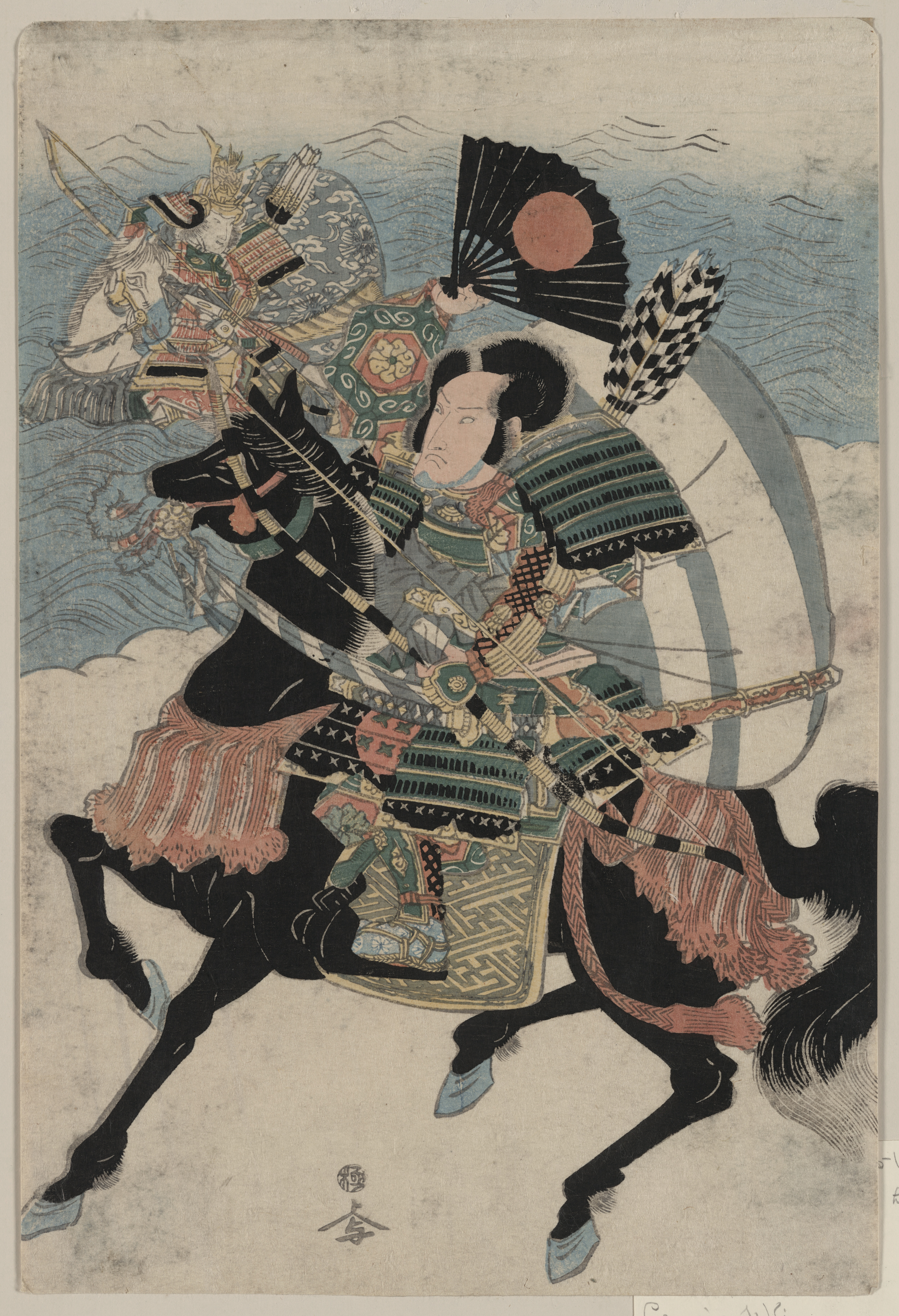
Ukiyo-e of Kumagai Naozane and Taira no Atsumori

Kumagai beckoned Atsumori with his fan, taunting Atsumori by saying, “I see that you are a commander-in-chief. It is dishonorable to show your back to an enemy. Return!”

Atsumori returned and they grappled on the beach. Kumagai was stronger. He knocked off Atsumori's helmet to deliver the finishing blow, only to be struck by the beauty of the young noble. Atsumori was “sixteen or seventeen years old, with a lightly powdered face and blackened teeth—a boy just the age of Naozane's own son...”

Kumagai, wishing to spare the life of the boy, asked for Atsumori's name, but the youth refused. He simply said that he was famous enough that Kumagai's superiors would recognize his head when it was time to assign rewards. At that moment, other Minamoto warriors arrived, and Kumagai knew that if he did not kill Atsumori, the other warriors surely would. Kumagai reasoned that it was better if he was the one to kill Atsumori, because he could offer prayers on his behalf for the afterlife.

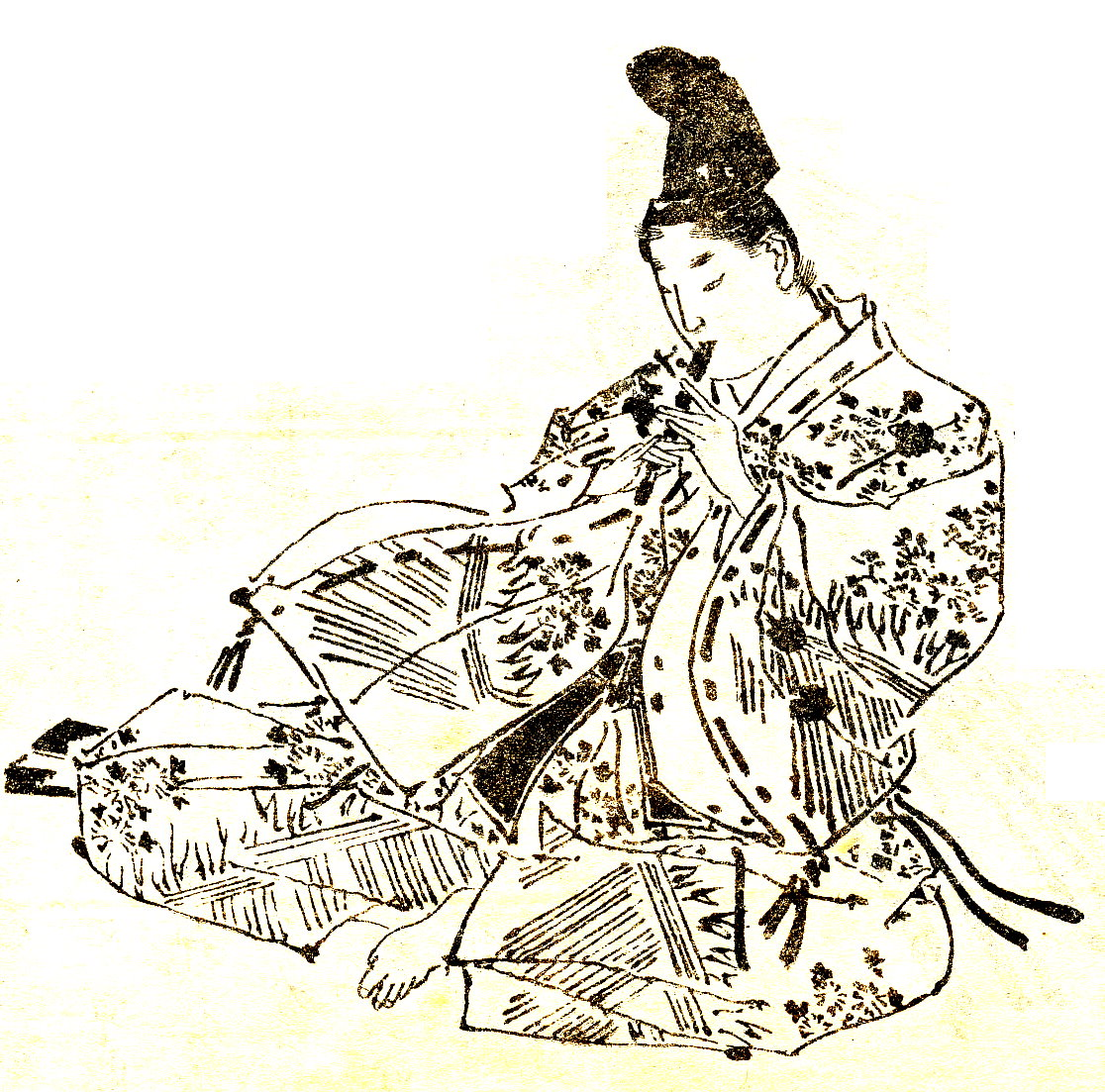
Drawing of Atsumori playing the flute, a symbol of his youth and naïveté in the Noh play Atsumori

Kumagai while crying beheaded the youth. Searching the body for something to wrap the head in, he came across a bag containing a flute. He realized that Atsumori must have been one of the soldiers playing music before the battle and thought, “there are tens of thousands of riders in our eastern armies, but I am sure none of them has brought a flute to the battlefield. Those court nobles are refined men!”

It is said that the beheading of Atsumori is what led Kumagai to take priestly vows and become a Buddhist monk.

== In other works ==
The Atsumori narrative became the subject of many subsequent works, including:

- The Noh play, Atsumori, which follows Kumagai, now known as the Buddhist priest Renshō, as he speaks with and prays for the dead Atsumori.
- The Bunraku puppet play, later adapted for Kabuki, Ichinotani Futaba Gunki.
- A Narrative: Atsumori, which expands upon the Tales of the Heike version and includes a section where Kumagai personally returns the body of Atsumori to the Minamoto.
- Little Atsumori, the tale of the resulting plight of Atsumori's wife and his yet unborn son.
- The lesser-known Kabuki play Sakigake Genpei Tsutsuji (otherwise called Ogiya Kumagai, or Suma no Miyako Genpei Tsutsuji), where Atsumori hides his identity by dressing up as the girl Kohagi and working in a fan shop.
- Atsumori, as a Kami, is a character in Wen Spencer's modern fantasy novel Eight Million Gods.

Oda Nobunaga, the 16th-century warlord often quoted from the Kōwakamai version of "Atsumori", which gave Atsumori a death poem 人間五十年、下天のうちをくらぶれば、夢幻の如くなり。一度生を享け滅せぬもののあるべきか [Man's life of fifty years, against Heaven's span, Like a dream, a phantom. Once granted breath, what being escapes its final fade?"].

== See also ==
- The Tale of Heike
