= Shuko (actress) =

Japanese actress and lyricist (born 1991)

- 柊子
- Born: September 29, 1991 (age 34); Nara Prefecture, Japan
- Other name: Shu
- Occupations: Actress, lyricist
- Agent: Act21
- Height: 1.65 m (5 ft 5 in)
- Website: Act21

Shuko (柊子, Shūko; born September 29, 1991, in Nara Prefecture, Japan) is a Japanese actress and lyricist who is represented by the talent agency, Act21. As a lyricist, she is nicknamed Shu.

== Biography ==
During high school at 2005, Shuko debuted in the stage play, Han Sāsu no Nichijō, which was staged by her current agency. In the summer of 2007, she auditioned for the film, Nasu Shōnenki, and passed. Shuko's television drama debut was in the Fuji TV drama, Taiyo to Umi no Kyoshitsu. In 2008, she participated as an initial member of the girl unit, JK21. Shuko later graduated in less than a year, but that became an occasion for her to work as a lyricist.

Her hobbies are playing the piano, buyō dancing, and horseback riding. She has a friendship with Hanshin Tigers coach, Yutaka Wada. The actress she most respects is Eri Fukatsu.

== Filmography ==
=== TV series ===
Year	Title	Role	Network	Notes
2008	Taiyo to Umi no Kyoshitsu	Nami Arai	Fuji TV	
2009	Shitsuji Kissa ni Okaerinasaimase	Mizuki	MBS	
2009	Sagishi Ririko		TV Tokyo	
2010	Daimajin Kanon		TV Tokyo	
2010	Kaze ni Mukatte Hashire!	Yoko Nakatsu	ABC	
2010	Bitter Sugar		NHK	
2012	Onsen Waka Okami no Satsujin Suiri 23		TV Asahi	
2014	Yabai Kenji Yaba Ken 3: Yabaken no Bōsō Sōsa		Fuji TV	
2015	Mare	Toko Yano	NHK	
2015	Detective versus Detectives	Nana Sawayanagi / Kunio Sawayanagi	Fuji TV	Episodes 9 and 10

=== Films ===
Year	Title	Role	Notes
2001	Onmyoji		
2008	Nasu Shōnenki		
2009	Shizumanu Taiyō		
2011	Runway Beat		
2011	Yoake no Machi de		
2012	We Were There		
2013	Platinum Data		
2013	Kids Return		
2017	Marriage	Ruriko Sengoku	
