= Ikuta Shrine =

Shinto shrine in Kobe, Japan

Ikuta Shrine 生田神社
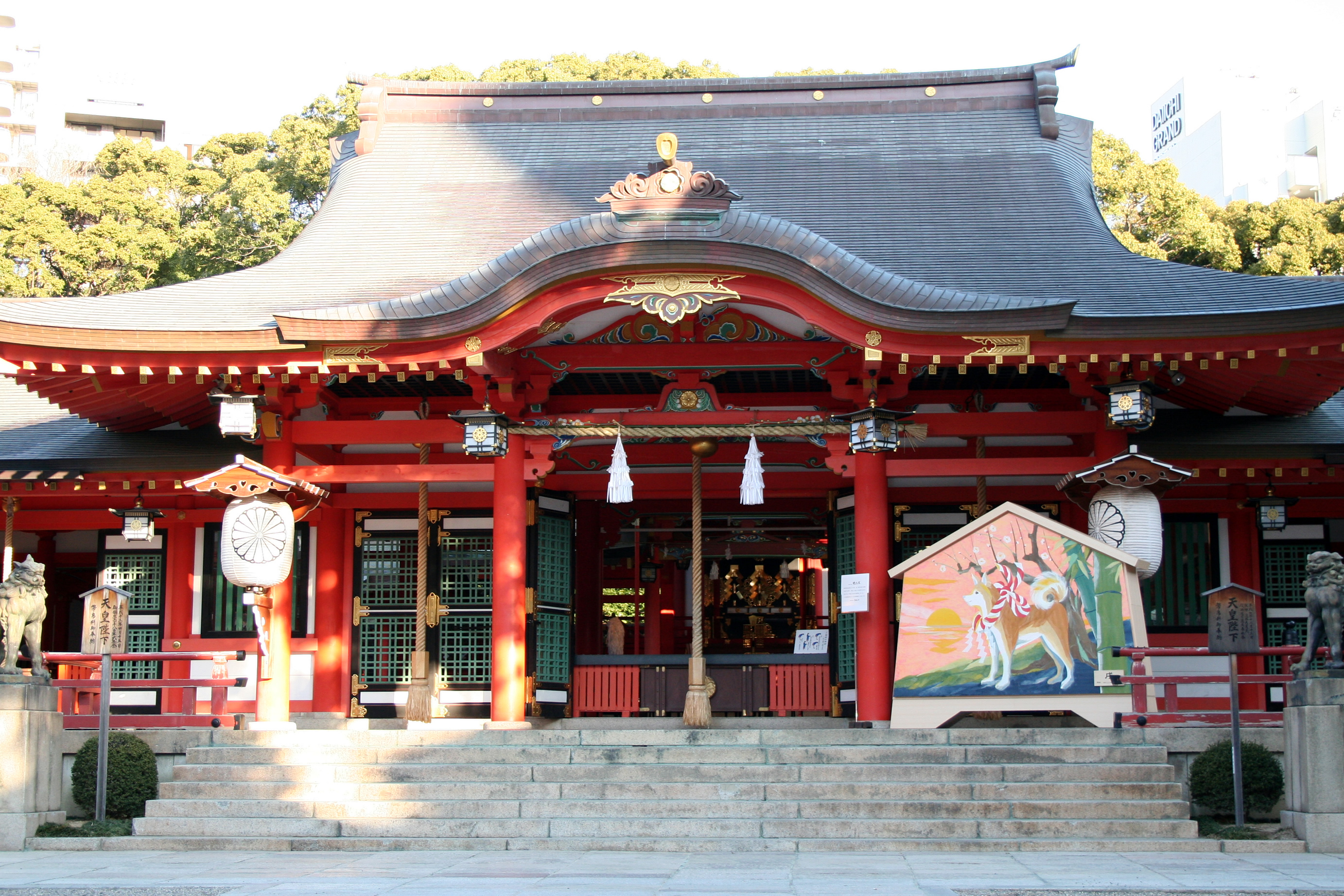
- Honden (Main Hall)

- Location within Japan

Religion
- Affiliation: Shinto
- Deity: Wakahiru-me

Location
- Location: 1-2-1 Shimoyamate-dōri, Chūō-ku, Kobe, Hyōgo prefecture
- Coordinates: 34°41′42″N 135°11′26″E

Architecture
- Founder: Empress Jingū
- Established: 3rd century

Website
- www.ikutajinja.or.jp

Ikuta Shrine (生田神社, Ikuta-jinja) is a Shinto shrine in the Chūō Ward of Kobe, Japan, and is possibly among the oldest shrines in the country.

It was founded by Empress Jingu when she returned from the Three Kan (三韓, Korea) campaign.

She was nearly shipwrecked but managed to survive thanks to praying to Watatsumi, and she made the shrine to honor him. Ikasuri Shrine and Watatsumi Shrine were both also made at the same time by the Empress.

It contains the Settsu Sannomiya.

== History ==
According to Nihon Shoki, it was founded by the Empress Jingū at the beginning of the 3rd century AD to enshrine the kami Wakahirume. It was one of three shrines established at this time; the others are Hirota Shrine, dedicated to Amaterasu, and Nagata Shrine, dedicated to Kotoshiro-nushi (also known as Ebisu).

During the Genpei War, parts of the Battle of Ichi-no-Tani took place in and around this shrine, and are commemorated by markers in the Ikuta forest behind the shrine. The shrine's land was much larger back then, before the city of Kobe was built around it. Thus, the precise locations of skirmishes or events can no longer be commemorated on shrine land.

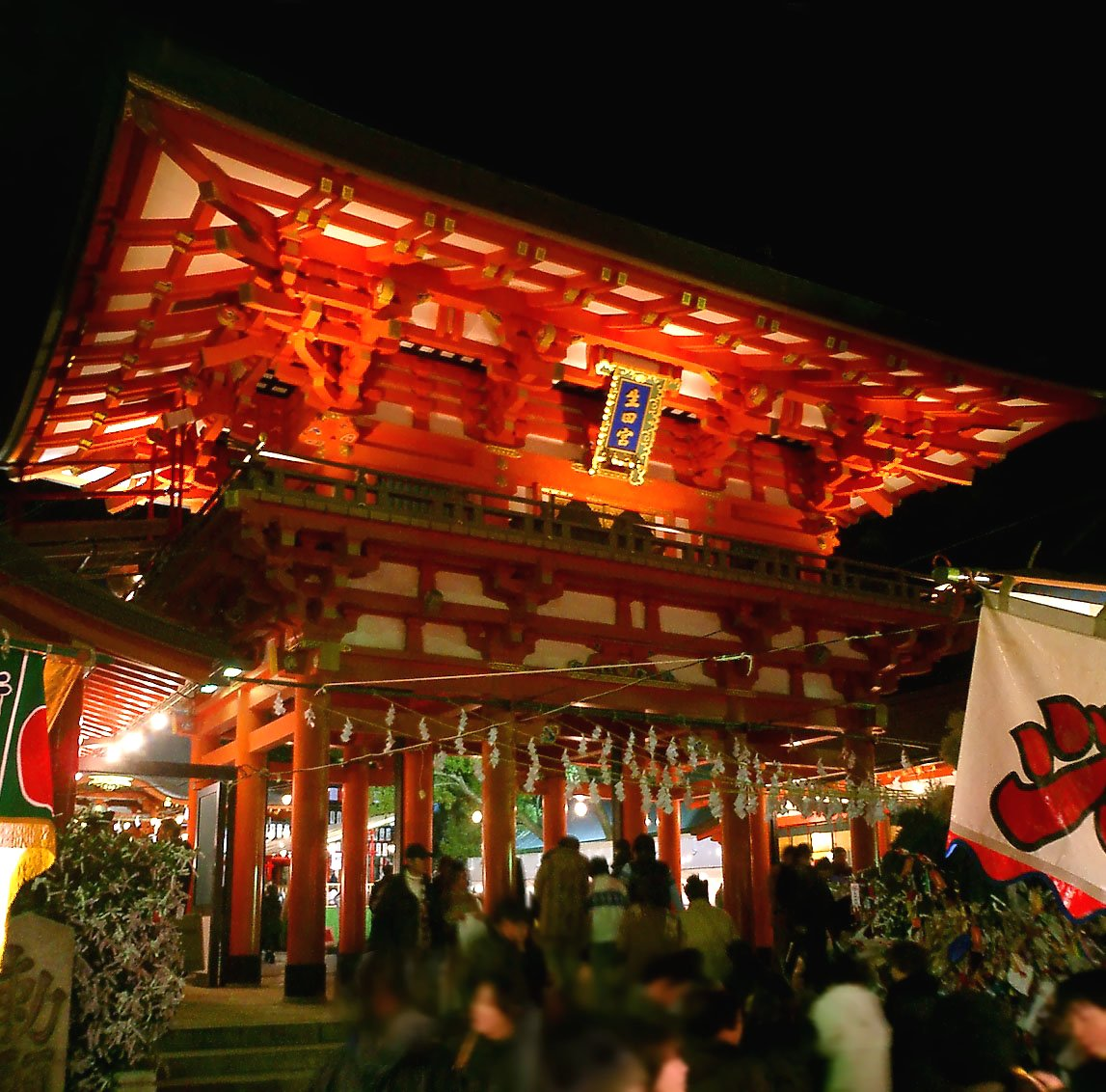
Rōmon

== Festivals and events ==
Today, two Noh plays, Ebira and Ikuta Atsumori, which retell aspects of the Genpei War, are performed near the Ikuta Shrine on a regular basis. They are performed every year at Ikuta's Autumn Festival (秋祭り, Aki-matsuri).

== See also ==
- List of Shinto shrines
- Twenty-Two Shrines
- Modern system of ranked Shinto Shrines
