= Battle of Ichi-no-Tani =

Battle in 1184 in Japan

- Part of the Genpei War
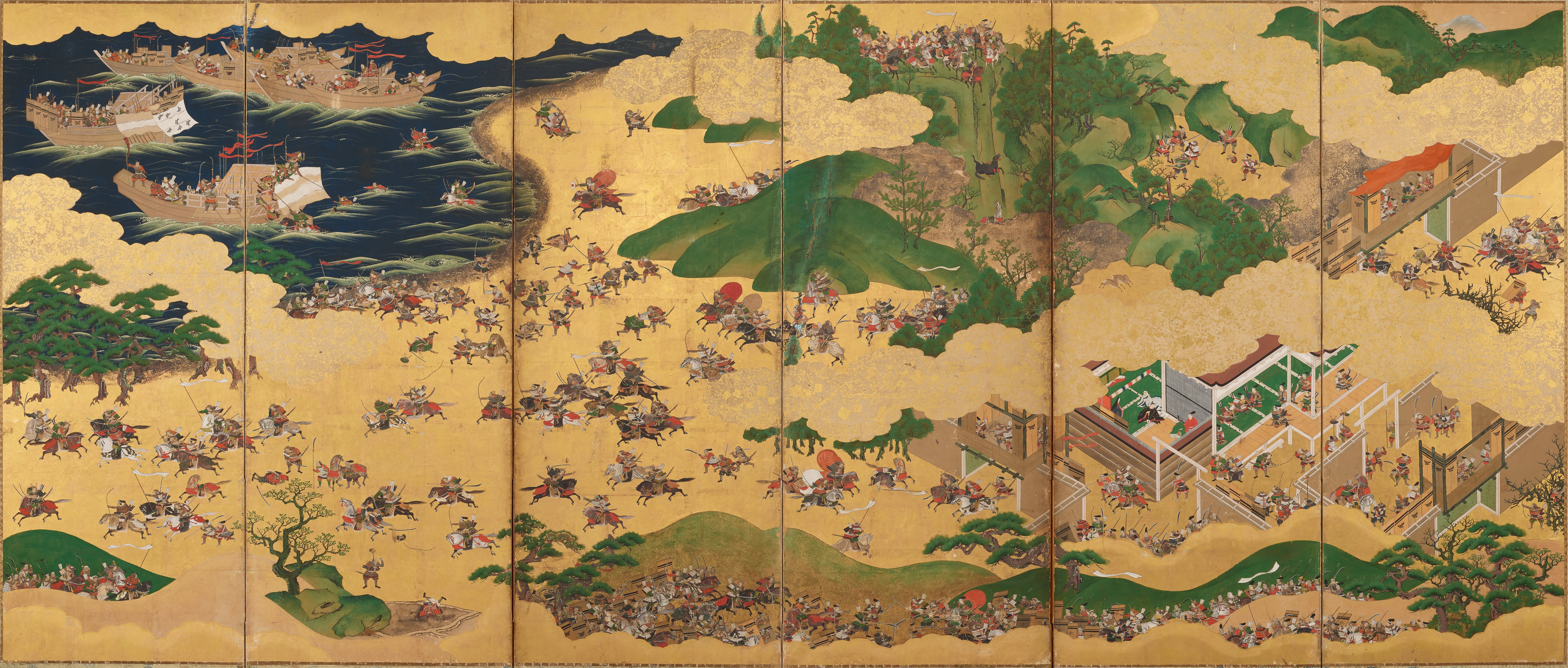
- Folding screen painting, Kano School
Date	20 March 1184
Location	Ichi-no-Tani, Settsu Province 34°38′25″N 135°6′19″E
Result	Minamoto victory

Belligerents
Minamoto clan	Taira clan

Commanders and leaders
Minamoto no Yoshitsune; Minamoto no Noriyori	Taira no Tadanori; Taira no Shigehira; Taira no Noritsune; Taira no Narimori (executed); Taira no Michimori (executed)

Strength
3,000	5,000

Casualties and losses
Unknown	1,000

The Battle of Ichi-no-Tani (一ノ谷の戦い, Ichi-no-Tani no tatakai) was fought between the attacking Minamoto clan and the defending Taira clan at Suma, to the west of present-day Kobe, Japan, on 20 March 1184. It sat on a very narrow strip of shore, between mountains on the north, and the sea to the south. This made it quite defensible, but also made it difficult to maneuver troops inside the fortress. The Taira suffered a crucial defeat to the forces of Minamoto no Yoshitsune and Minamoto no Noriyori.

== Battle ==
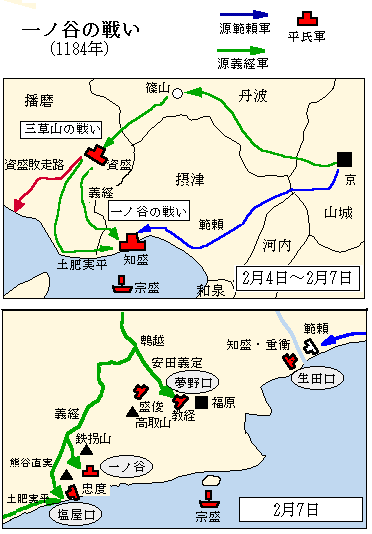
Tactical maps of the battle.

Minamoto no Yoshitsune split his forces in two. Minamoto no Noriyori's forces attacked the Taira clan at Ikuta Shrine, in the woods a short distance to the east. A second detachment, no more than a hundred horsemen under Yoshitsune himself, attacked the Taira at Ichi-no-Tani from the mountain ridge to the north. At the chosen hour, the Minamoto forces attacked causing confusion among the Taira who neither deployed nor retreated. Only about 3,000 Taira escaped to Yashima, while Tadanori was killed and Shigehira captured. Also killed from the Taira clan were Lord Michimori, Tsunemasa, Atsumori, Moromori, Tomoakira, Tsunetoshi, and Moritoshi.

Ichi-no-Tani is one of the most famous battles of the Genpei War, in large part due to the individual combats that occurred here. Benkei, probably the most famous of all warrior monks, fought alongside his lord Minamoto no Yoshitsune here, and many of the Taira's most important and powerful warriors were present as well.

Ichi-no-Tani is the last recorded instance in which crossbows were used in a Japanese siege.

== Legacy ==
The death of Taira no Atsumori at the hand of Kumagai no Naozane during the battle is a particularly famous passage in the Heike Monogatari. It has been dramatized in noh and kabuki, and in popular fiction, Oda Nobunaga is often portrayed as performing the noh at his own death (ningen goju nen geten no uchi wo kurabureba, yumemaboroshi no gotoku nari) in Honnō-ji Incident. The death of Atsumori is arguably among the most celebrated acts of single combat in all of Japanese history.

== Gallery ==
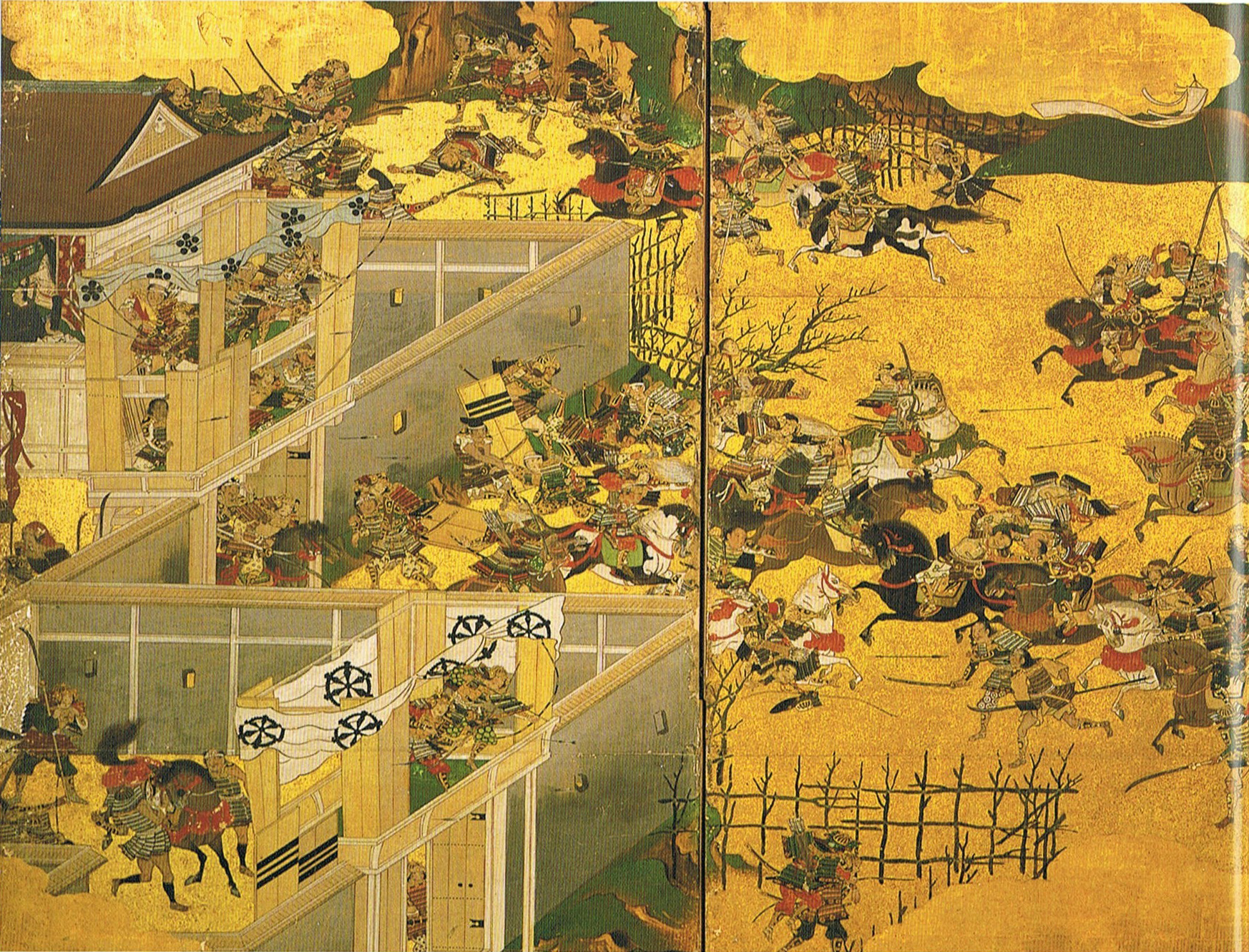
Scene from the battle, detail from screen painting

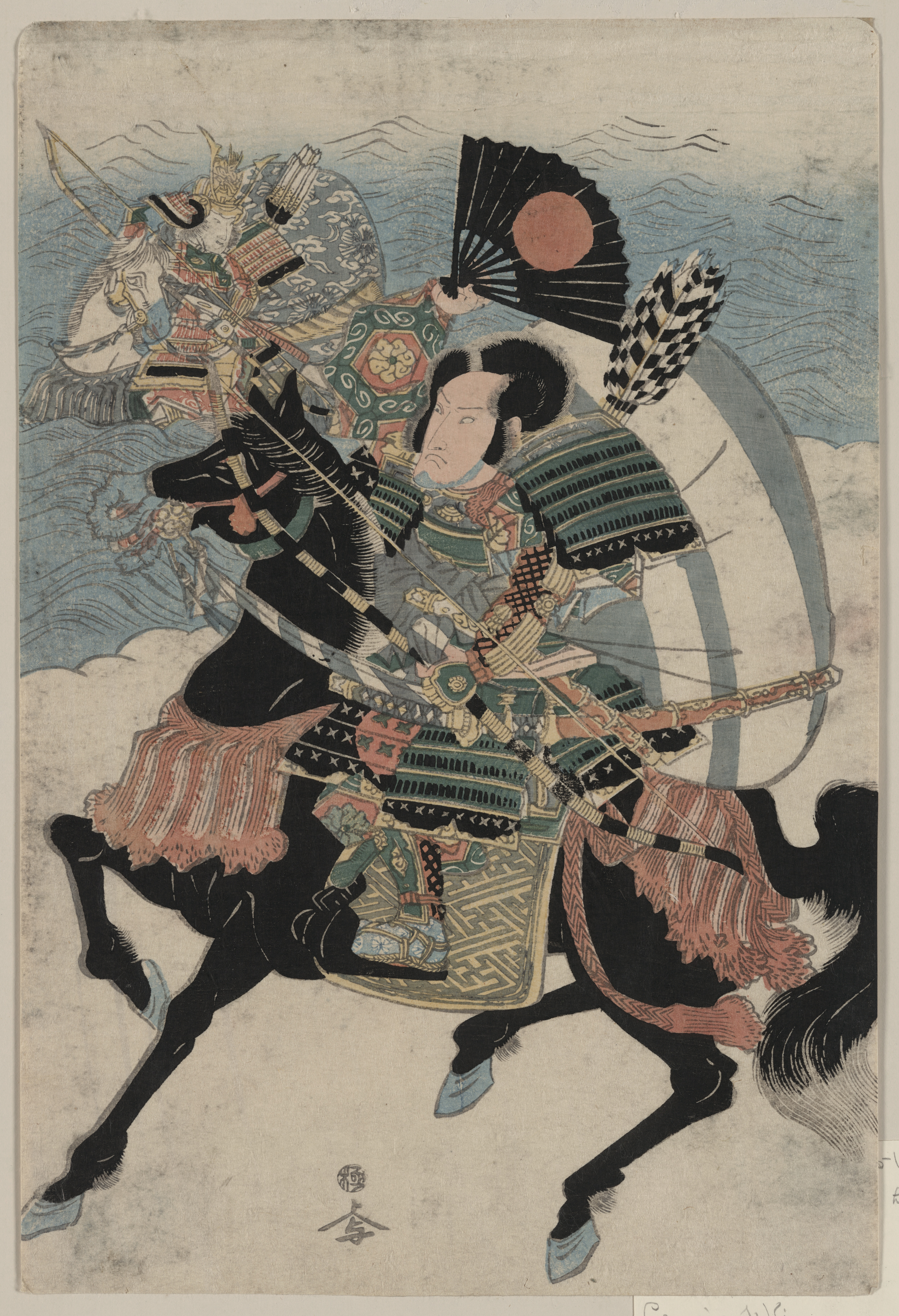
The encounter between Kumagai Naozane and Taira no Atsumori, woodblock print, circa 1820

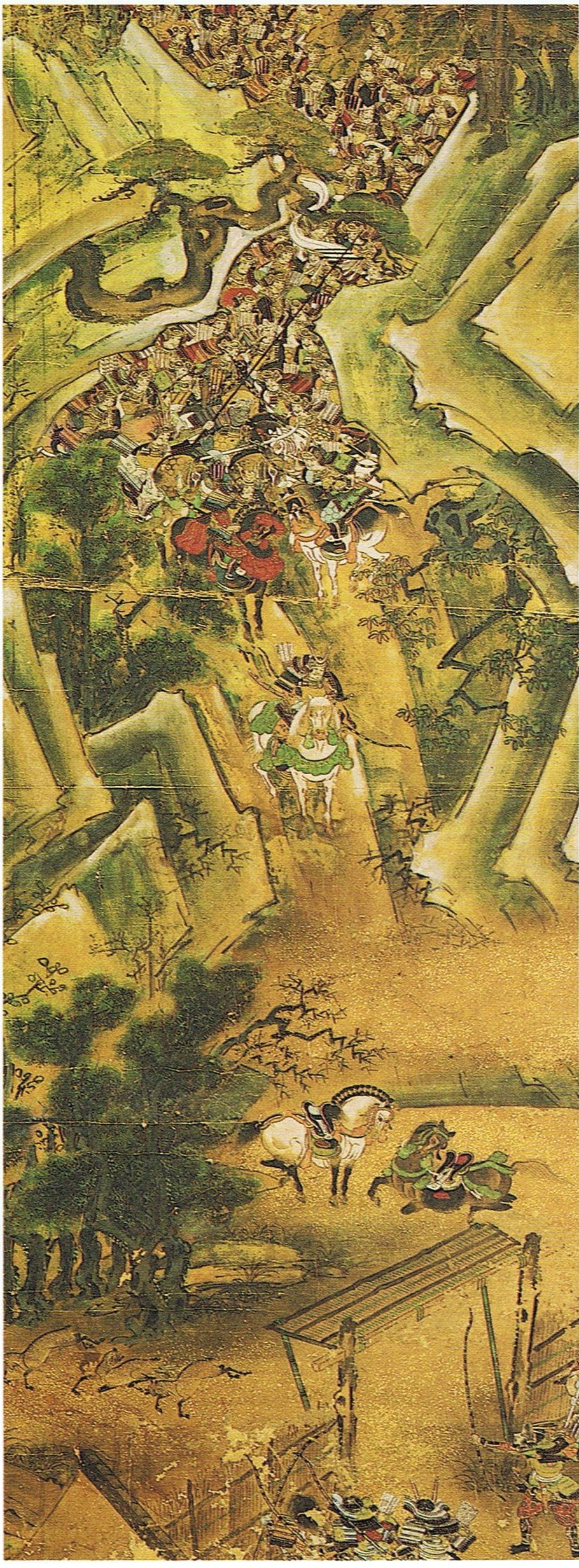
Attack down the slope on the Taira camp

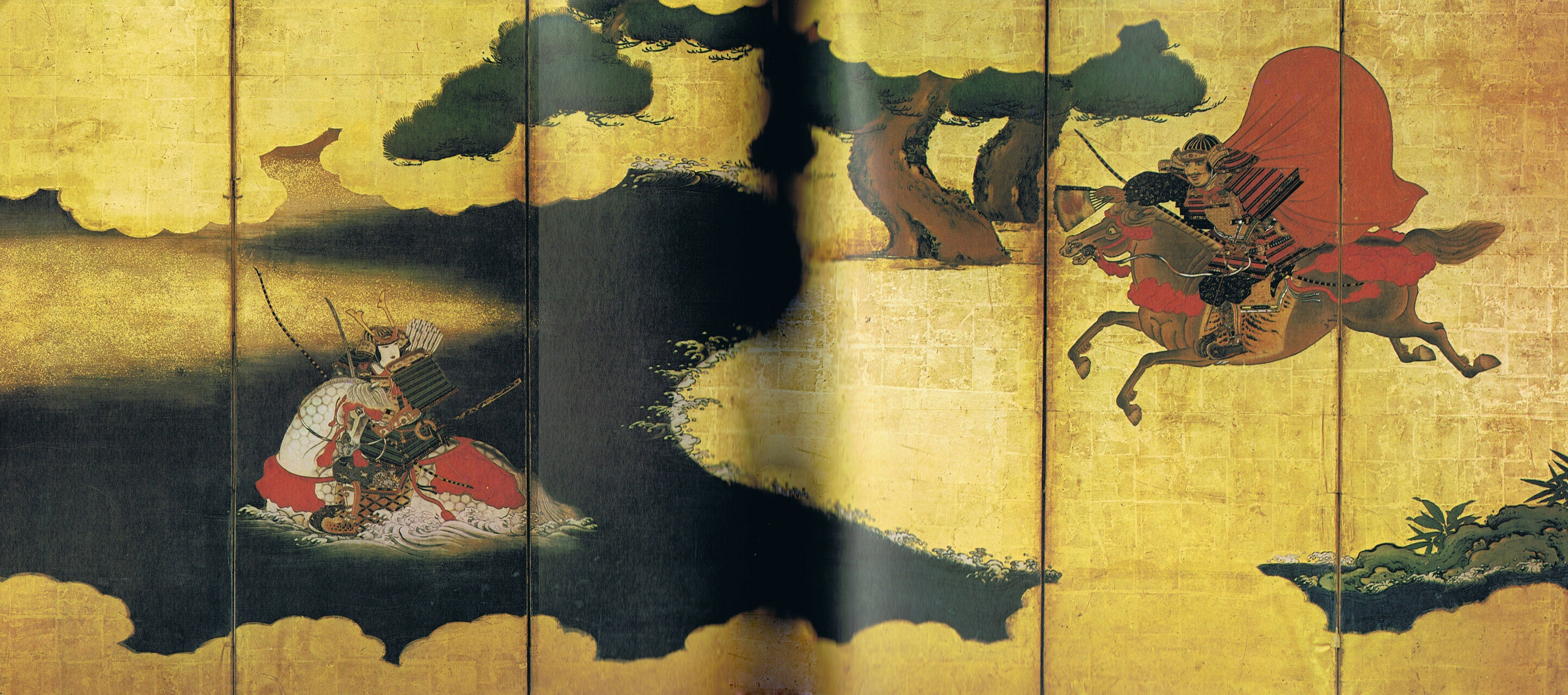
Encounter between Naozane (right) and Atsumori (left), screen painting

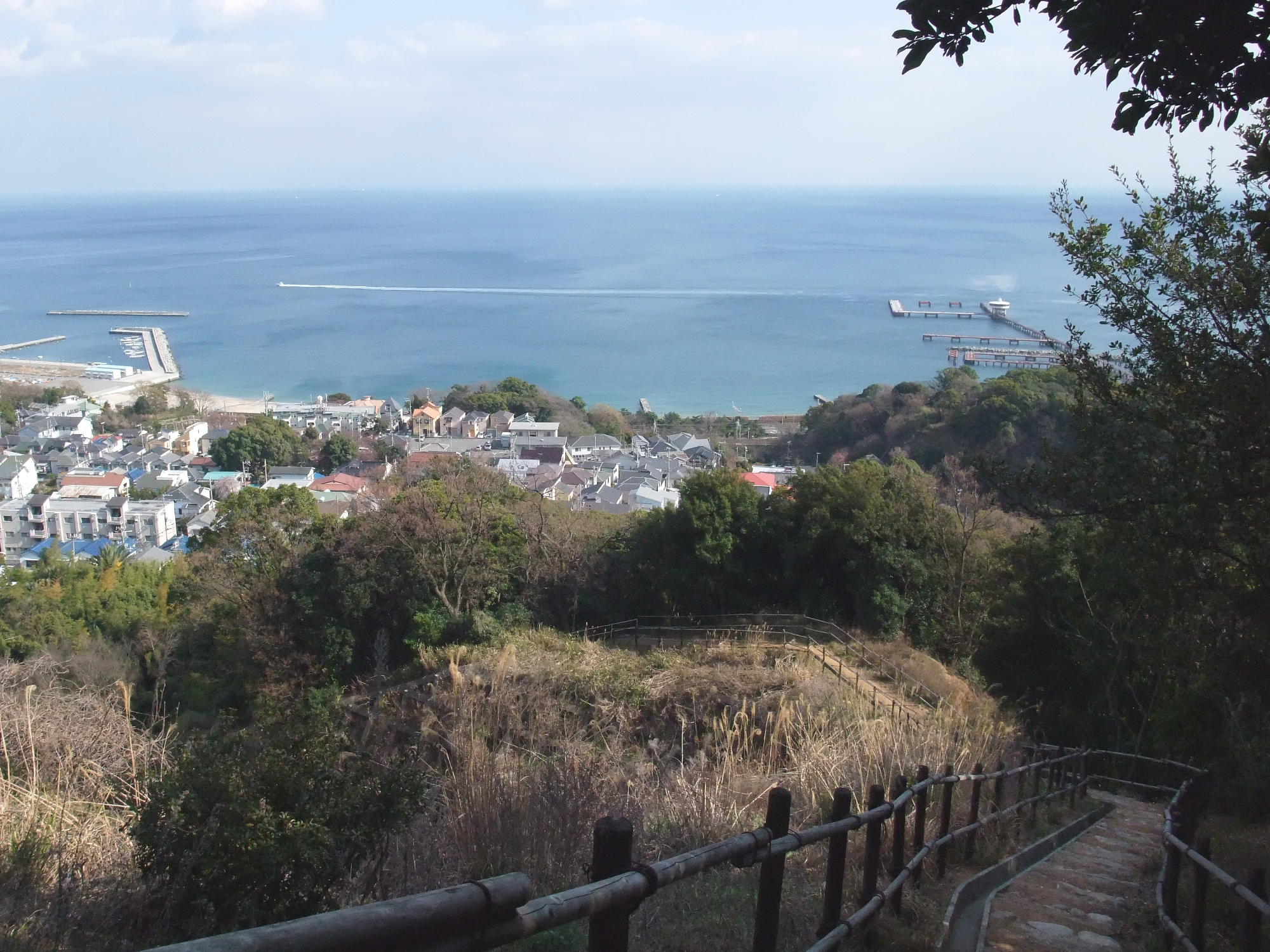
View today of the narrow coastal strip where the battle took place

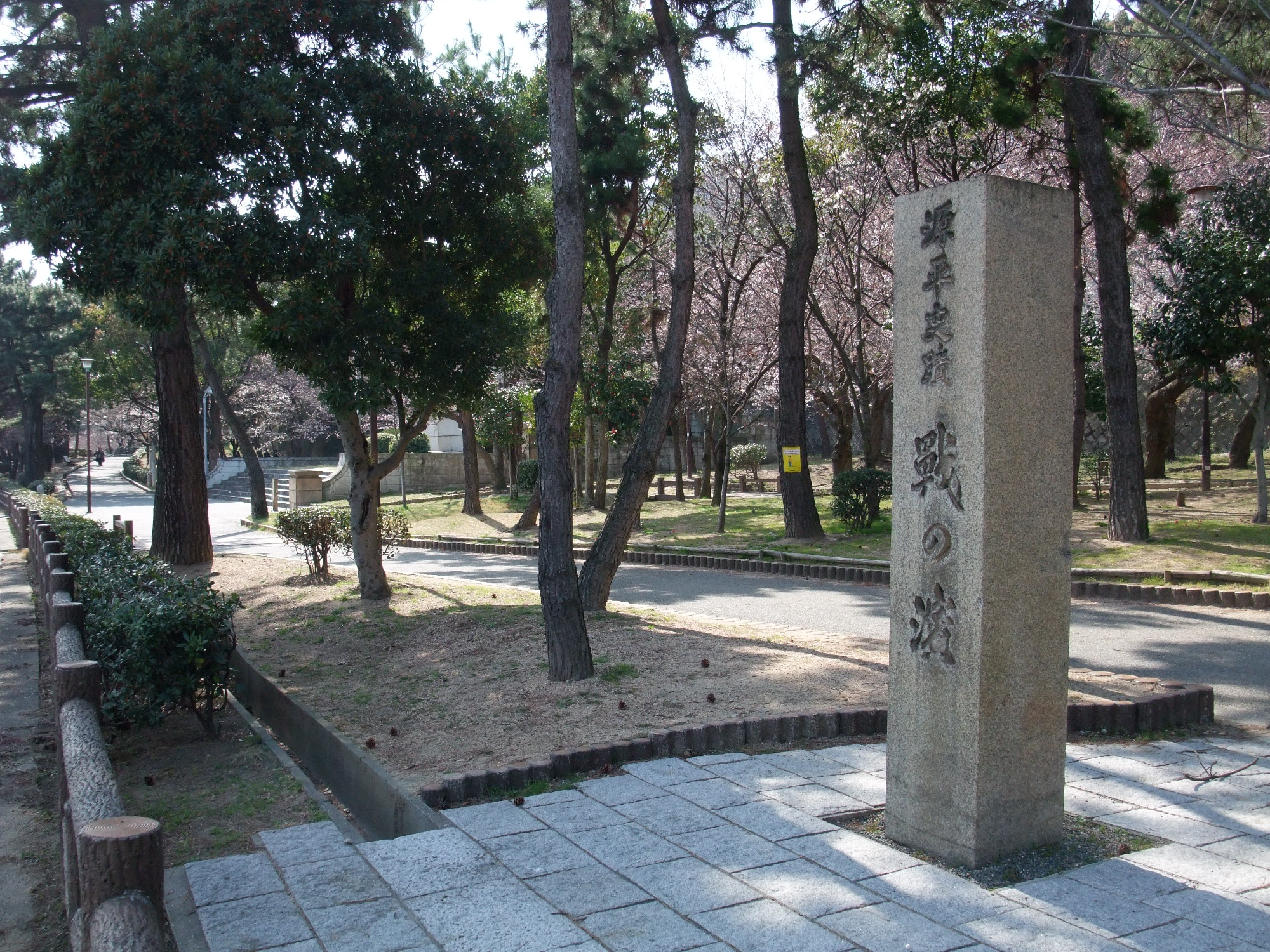
Monument at the site of the battle

== See also ==
- The Tale of Heike
