= The Tale of the Heike =

Japanese epic compiled prior to 1330

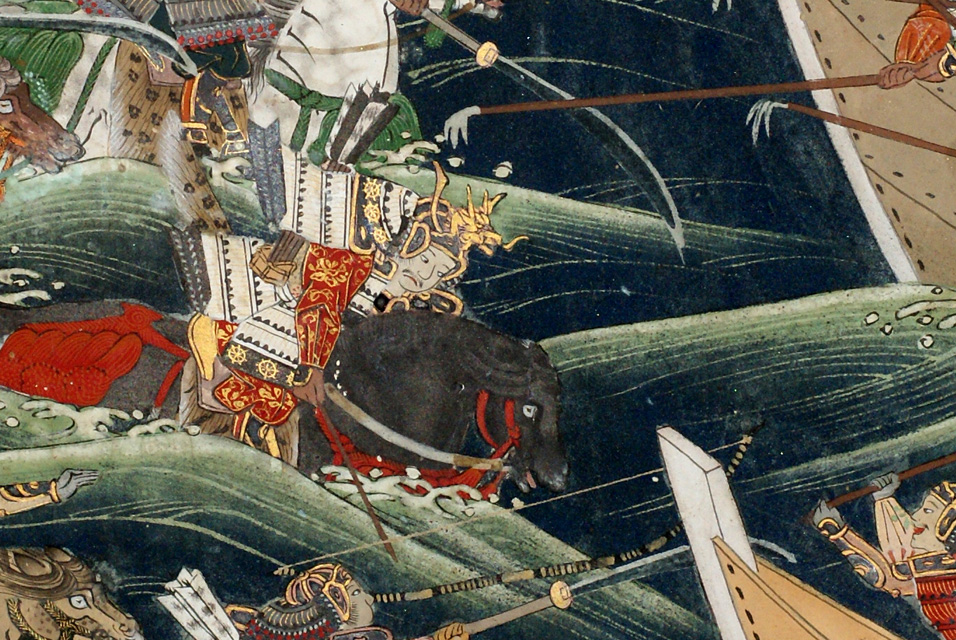
Detail of a screen painting depicting scenes from The Tales of Heike

The Tale of the Heike (平家物語, Heike Monogatari) is an epic account compiled prior to 1330 of the struggle between the Taira clan and Minamoto clan for control of Japan at the end of the 12th century in the Genpei War (1180–1185). It is written in the form of a gunki monogatari.

It has been translated into English at least five times. The first translation was by Arthur Lindsay Sadler, in 1918–1921. A complete translation in nearly 800 pages by Hiroshi Kitagawa & Bruce T. Tsuchida was published in 1975. It was also translated by Helen McCullough in 1988. An abridged translation by Burton Watson was published in 2006. In 2012, Royall Tyler completed his translation, which, he says, seeks to be mindful of the performance style for which the work was originally intended.

Historical novelist Eiji Yoshikawa published a prose rendering in the Asahi Weekly in 1950, under the title New Tale of the Heike (Shin Heike Monogatari).

== Background ==
=== Title ===
Heike (平家) refers to the Taira (平), hei being the on'yomi reading of the first kanji and ke (家) meaning "family". However, in the term "the Genpei War" hei is read as pei and the gen (源) is the first kanji in "Genji" the alternative name for the Minamoto clan.

=== Authorship ===
The Tale of the Heike's origin cannot be reduced to a single creator. Like most epics (the work is an epic chronicle in prose rather than verse), it is the result of the conglomeration of differing versions passed down through an oral tradition by biwa-playing bards known as biwa hōshi.

The monk Yoshida Kenkō (1282–1350) offers a theory as to the authorship of the text in his famous work Tsurezuregusa, which he wrote in 1330. According to Kenkō, "The former governor of Shinano, Yukinaga, wrote Heike monogatari and told a blind man named Shōbutsu to sing it". He also confirms the biwa connection of that blind man, who "was natural from the eastern tract", and who was sent by Yukinaga to "collect some information about samurai, about their bows, their horses and their war strategy. Yukinaga wrote it after that".

One of the key points in this theory is that the book was written in a difficult combination of Chinese and Japanese (wakan konkō shō), which in those days was mastered only by educated monks and nobles, such as Yukinaga. However, in the end, as the tale is the result of a long oral tradition, there is no single true author; Yukinaga is only one possibility of being the first to compile this masterpiece into a written form. Moreover, since it is true that there are frequent steps back, and that the style is not the same throughout the composition, this can only mean that it is a collective work.

== Origin and themes ==
The story of the Heike was compiled from a collection of oral stories recited by travelling monks who chanted to the accompaniment of the biwa, an instrument reminiscent of the lute. The most widely read version of the Heike monogatari was compiled by a blind monk named Kakuichi, in 1371. The Heike is considered one of the great classics of Medieval Japanese literature.

Two main strands feed into the central ethos of the tale, samurai and buddhist.

At one level, the Tale is an account of martial heroism – of courage, cruelty, power, glory, sacrifice and sorrow. Those who emphasise this aspect of the story point to its glorification of the heroic spirit, its avoidance of the realistic brutality and squalor of war, and its aestheticisation of death: a classic instance of the latter is the comparison of the drowned samurai in the final battle to a maple-leaf brocade upon the waves.

Others, while still accepting the importance of the military episodes and of heroic figures like Yoshitsune, would emphasise instead the Tale’s immersion in Buddhist thought, and its themes of duty, Dharma, and fate. Announced at the very beginning is the Buddhist law of transience and impermanence, specifically in the form of the fleeting nature of fortune, an analog of sic transit gloria mundi. The theme of impermanence (mujō) is captured in the famous opening passage:

祇園精舎の鐘の聲、諸行無常の響き有り。 沙羅雙樹の花の色、盛者必衰の理を顯す。 驕れる者も久しからず、唯春の夜の夢の如し。 猛き者も遂には滅びぬ、偏に風の前の塵に同じ。

Gionshōja no kane no koe, Shogyōmujō no hibiki ari. Sarasōju no hana no iro, Jōshahissui no kotowari wo arawasu. Ogoreru mono mo hisashikarazu, tada haru no yo no yume no gotoshi. Takeki mono mo tsui ni wa horobin(u), hitoeni kaze no mae no chiri ni onaji.

The sound of the Gion Shōja bells echoes the impermanence of all things; the color of the sāla flowers reveals the truth that the prosperous must decline. The proud do not endure, they are like a dream on a spring night; the mighty fall at last, they are as dust before the wind.

–Chapter 1.1, Helen Craig McCullough's translation

The 4-character expression (yojijukugo) "the prosperous must decline" (盛者必衰, jōshahissui) is a phrase from the Humane King Sutra, in full "The prosperous inevitably decline, the full inevitably empty" (盛者必衰、実者必虚, jōsha hissui, jissha hikkyo).

The second religious concept evident in the Tale of the Heike is another Buddhist idea, karma. The concept of karma says that every action has consequences that become apparent later in life. Thus, karma helps to deal with the problem of both moral and natural evil. Evil acts in life will bring about an inevitable suffering later in life. This can be seen clearly with the treatment of Kiyomori in The Tale of the Heike, who is cruel throughout his life, and later falls into a painful illness that kills him.

=== Focus, divisions and influence ===
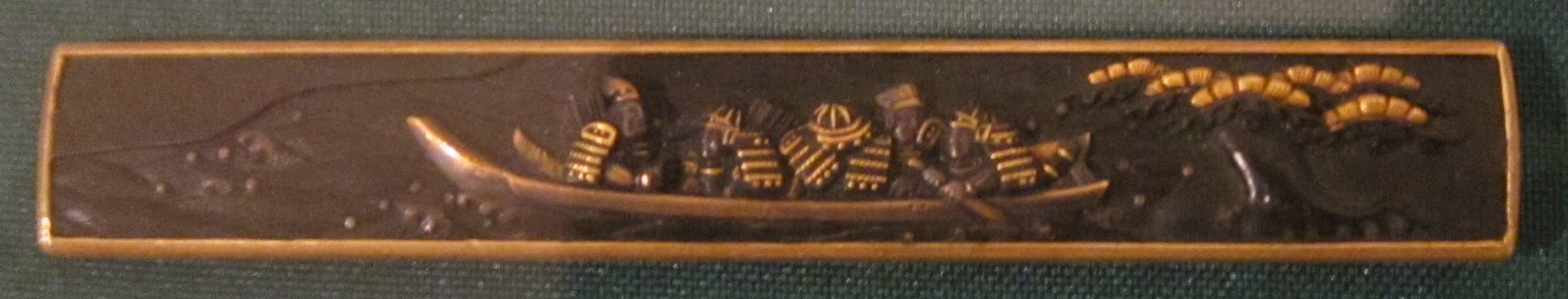
Knife handle (kozuka) from matching seven-piece set of sword fittings with scenes from The Tale of Heike

The Buddhist theme of impermanence in the Heike is epitomised in the fall of the powerful Taira – the samurai clan who defeated the imperial-backed Minamoto in 1161. The Taira warrior family sowed the seeds of their own destruction with acts of arrogance and pride that led to their defeat in 1185 at the hands of the revitalized Minamoto, and the first establishment of samurai government (Kamakura shogunate).

The story is episodic in nature and designed to be told in a series of nightly instalments. While tinged with Buddhism, it is also a samurai epic focusing on warrior culture – an ideology that ultimately laid the groundwork for bushido (the way of the warrior). The Heike also includes a number of love stories, which harken back to earlier Heian literature.

The story is roughly divided into three sections. The central figure of the first section is Taira no Kiyomori who is described as arrogant, evil, ruthless and so consumed by the fires of hatred that even in death his feverish body does not cool when immersed in water. The main figure of the second section is the Minamoto general Minamoto no Yoshinaka. After he dies the main figure of the third section is the great samurai, Minamoto no Yoshitsune, a military genius who is falsely accused of treachery by his politically astute elder brother Minamoto no Yoritomo.

The Tale of the Heike has provided material for many later artistic works ranging from Noh plays and Kabuki plays, to woodblock prints, paintings and haiku; and is also referenced in modern works.

Battle scenes from the Tale of Heike, early 17th century

== Monogatari historiography ==
The Japanese have developed a number of complementary strategies for capturing, preserving and disseminating the essential elements of their commonly accepted national history – chronicles of sovereigns and events, biographies of eminent persons and personalities, and the military tale or gunki monogatari. This last form evolved from an interest in recording the activities of military conflicts in the late 12th century. The major battles, the small skirmishes and the individual contests (and the military figures who animate these accounts) have all been passed from generation to generation in the narrative formats of The Tale of Hōgen (1156), The Tale of Heiji (1159–1160), and the Heike Monogatari (1180–1185).

In each of these familiar monogatari, the central figures are popularly well known, the major events are generally understood, and the stakes as they were understood at the time are conventionally accepted as elements in the foundation of Japanese culture. The accuracy of each of these historical records has become a compelling subject for further study; and some accounts have been shown to withstand, while other presumed "facts" have turned out to be inaccurate.

The most prevalent and well-known edition of the Tale of the Heike today, the 1371 Kakuichi text, is generally thought to be a fictional dramatization of the Genpei War. Rather than focusing on the Genpei warriors as they actually were, but rather upon the "... ideal warrior as conceived by oral singers ..." it serves as an account of glorified conduct as a source of inspiration.

== Extension ==
The Genpei Jōsuiki, also known as the Genpei Seisuiki (源平盛衰記), is a 48-book extended version of the Heike Monogatari.

== Plot ==
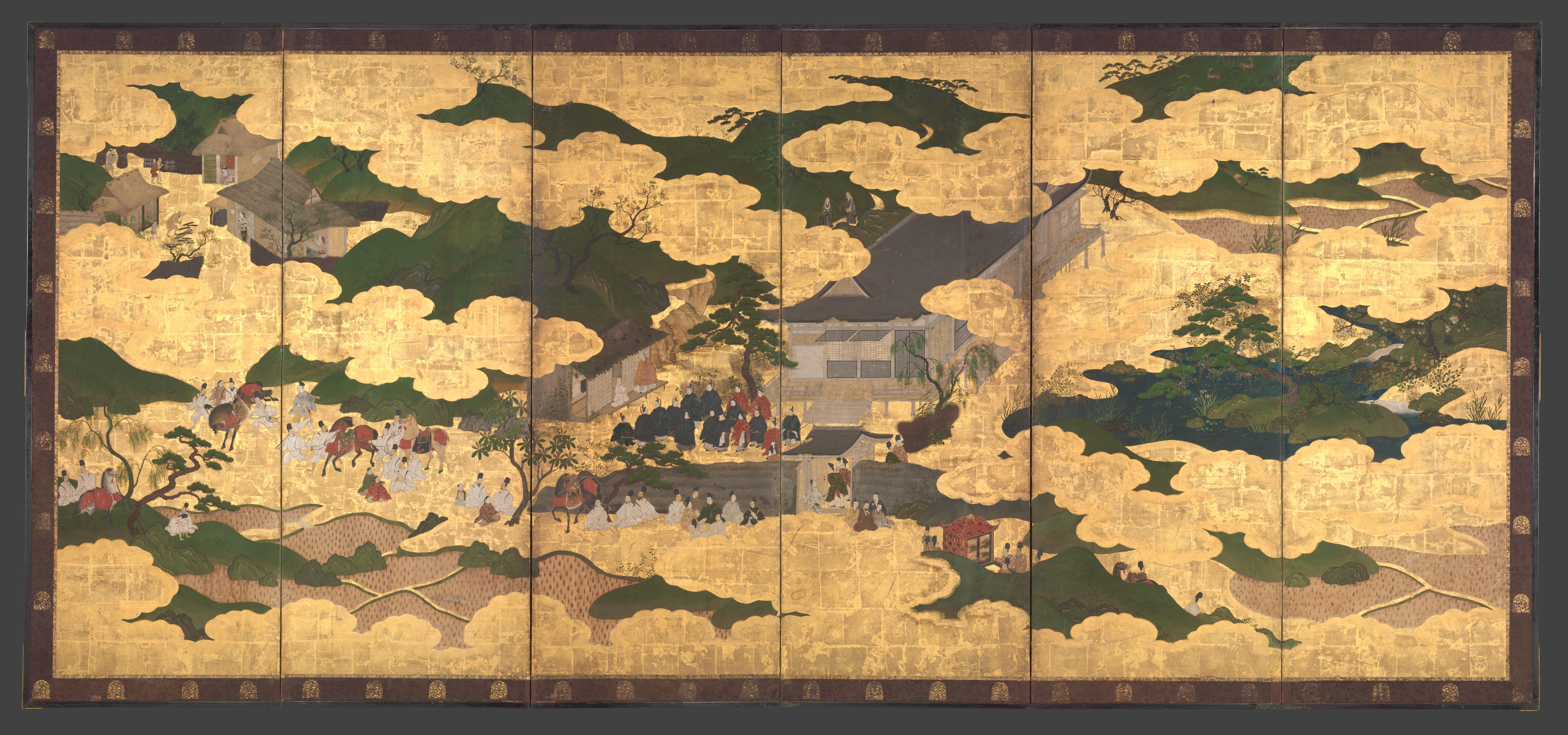
"Kogō" and "The Imperial Procession to Ōhara"

=== Chapter 1 ===
Two themes are presented in the famous introduction (the bells of the Gion Shōja): impermanence and the fall of the mighty (Taira no Kiyomori).

The chapter describes the rise of the Taira clan and early conflicts at the court. The first Taira who gets access to the Imperial court is Taira no Tadamori (1131). After Tadamori's death (1153), his son Kiyomori plays a key role in helping the Emperor Go-Shirakawa suppress the Hōgen rebellion (1156) and the Heiji rebellion (1159), thereby gaining more influence in the court affairs. The Taira clan members occupy major government positions, Kiyomori's daughter becomes the Emperor's wife, and more than half of all the provinces are under their control.

One of the episodes describing Kiyomori's arrogance is the famous story concerning the dancer Giō who falls out of Kiyomori's favor and becomes a nun. Kiyomori and the Taira even dare to contend with the powerful Regent, Fujiwara no Motofusa. Angered by the dominance of the Taira, Major Counselor Fujiwara no Narichika, retired Emperor Go-Shirakawa, Buddhist monk Saikō and others meet at Shishigatani, the villa of the temple administrator Shunkan, and plot to overthrow Kiyomori. Owing to conflict between Saikō's sons and sōhei of Enryaku-ji on Mount Hiei, the plot has to be postponed. The great fire of May 27, 1177, burns the Imperial Palace in the capital Heian-kyō.

=== Chapter 2 ===
In 1177, Retired Emperor Go-Shirakawa is in conflict with Enryaku-ji. Hearing a rumor about a possible attack on Enryaku-ji, one of the Shishi-no-tani conspirators informs Taira no Kiyomori of the plot. The monk Saikō is executed and others are exiled. Kiyomori is angered by the participation of the Retired Emperor in the plot and prepares to arrest him. Taira no Shigemori, the eldest virtuous son of Kiyomori, successfully admonishes his father by reminding him of the Confucian value of loyalty to the Emperor. Major Counselor Fujiwara no Narichika is exiled to an island and cruelly executed. Other conspirators (Naritsune, Yasuyori and Shunkan) are exiled to Kikaijima near Satsuma Province.

Meanwhile, the Enryaku-ji complex is destroyed and a fire at the Zenkō-ji destroys a Buddhist statue. People believe these troubles to be signs of the Taira decline. Those exiled to Kikaijima build a shrine where they pray for return to the capital. They make a thousand stupas (Buddhist wooden objects) with their names and throw them into the sea. One of the pieces reaches the shore. It is brought to the capital and shown to Yasuyori's family. The news reaches Retired Emperor Go-Shirakawa and Kiyomori who see the stupa with emotion.

=== Chapter 3 ===
The illness of Kiyomori's pregnant daughter, Taira no Tokuko, is attributed to angry spirits of the executed, such as Fujiwara no Narichika, and the exiled. Taira no Kiyomori, interested in becoming a grandfather of the Imperial prince, agrees to a general amnesty. Fujiwara no Narichika's son Naritsune and Yasuyori are pardoned, but Shunkan is left alone on Kikaijima for letting the anti-Taira conspirators gather at his villa. A famous tragic scene follows when Shunkan beats his feet on the ground in despair.

Kiyomori's daughter Tokuko gives birth to the future Emperor Antoku (1178). A loyal youth in service of Shunkan, Ariō, journeys to the island finding Shunkan barely alive. Hearing the news of his family's death, Shunkan starves himself to death (1179). His suffering as well as the whirlwind that strikes the capital, are seen as signs of the fall of the Taira.

Kiyomori's virtuous son, Taira no Shigemori, goes on a pilgrimage to Kumano and asks the gods for a quick death if the Taira are to fall. In a short while, he falls ill and dies. Without Shigemori's restraining influence, Kiyomori is close to open war with Retired Emperor Go-Shirakawa. He leads soldiers to Kyoto where he exiles or dismisses 43 top court officials (including Regent Fujiwara no Motofusa). Next, Kiyomori imprisons Retired Emperor Go-Shirakawa in the desolate Seinan palace (1179).

=== Chapter 4 ===
Emperor Takakura is forced to retire and Emperor Antoku, Kiyomori's grandson, aged 3, becomes the new Emperor. Retired Emperor Takakura angers the monks of Enryaku-ji by going to the Itsukushima Shrine instead of the Enryaku-ji. Minamoto no Yorimasa persuades Prince Mochihito, the second son of Retired Emperor Go-Shirakawa, to lead Minamoto forces against the Taira and become the Emperor. Prince Mochihito issues an anti-Taira call to arms. The open conflict between the Minamoto and the Taira is triggered by Kiyomori's son Taira no Munemori humiliating Minamoto no Yorimasa's son by taking away his horse and calling it by the owner's name.

Taira no Kiyomori discovers the anti-Taira plot. Prince Mochihito avoids arrest by fleeing from the capital to Miidera. Yorimasa and the Miidera monks fight with Taira forces at the bridge over the Uji River (1180). Despite bravery of the monks, Taira forces cross the river and win the battle. Yorimasa commits suicide in the Byōdōin temple and Prince Mochihito is killed on the way to the allied Kōfuku-ji in Nara. One of the Prince Mochihito's sons is forced to become a monk, but the other son flees north to join the Minamoto forces. Kiyomori gives orders to burn the Miidera temple. Many temples are burned and people see it as a bad omen for the Taira.

=== Chapter 5 ===
Kiyomori moves the capital from Kyoto to his stronghold Fukuhara-kyō in 1180. Strange ghosts appear to Kiyomori. News of unrest in the eastern provinces (controlled by the Minamoto) reaches the new capital.

A story about the monk Mongaku is inserted as a background to Minamoto no Yoritomo's revolt. Mongaku is an ascetic with strange powers who requested donations at the court in 1179. After the refusal of Retired Emperor Go-Shirakawa he caused trouble at the court and was exiled to Izu Province.

At Izu, Mongaku convinces Minamoto no Yoritomo to revolt against the Taira. Then he goes to Fukuhara and brings back the Imperial Edict from Go-Shirakawa permitting Minamoto no Yoritomo to overthrow the Taira. Kiyomori sends a military expedition to put down the rebellion of Yoritomo. When they reach the Fuji River, the Taira forces hear stories about the might of eastern warriors and fear that Minamoto forces outnumber them. At night, a flock of birds rises with great noise and the Taira forces, thinking that they are attacked, retreat in panic.

Kiyomori, under pressure from temples and courtiers, moves the capital back to Kyoto. Upon hearing the rumours of an attack being planned by the Taira, monks of the Kōfukuji temple (who supported the rebellion of Prince Mochihito) revolt and kill messengers sent by Kiyomori. Taira forces lay siege to Nara and burn many important temples (Tōdai-ji, Kōfuku-ji), statues and Buddhist texts. Retired Emperors and courtiers lament the destruction of Nara. This evil deed is believed to lead to Kiyomori's downfall.

=== Chapter 6 ===
In 1181, Retired Emperor Takakura dies. Kiso no Yoshinaka (cousin of Minamoto no Yoritomo in the northwestern provinces) plans a rebellion against the Taira and raises an army. Messengers bring news of anti-Taira forces gathering under the Minamoto leadership in the eastern provinces, Kyūshū, Shikoku. The Taira have trouble dealing with all the rebellions.

Worsening matters for the Taira, their leader, Taira no Kiyomori, falls ill. His body is set alight but no water can cool him. Water sprayed on his body turns to flames and black smoke that fills the room. Kiyomori's wife dreams of a carriage in flames that will take Kiyomori to Hell for burning Buddhist statues in the Tōdai-ji. Before dying in agony, Kiyomori makes a wish to have the head of Minamoto no Yoritomo hung before his grave. His death (in 1181, age 64) highlights the themes of impermanence and fall of the mighty. Kiyomori's evil deeds will become his torturers in Hell. His fame and power turned to smoke and dust.

In the east, Taira forces are successful in several battles, but are not able to defeat the Minamoto forces. Divine forces punish and kill the governor appointed by Kiyomori to put down Kiso no Yoshinaka's rebellion. Kiso no Yoshinaka wins a major battle at Yokotagawara (1182). Taira no Munemori, the leader of the Taira clan, is conferred a high rank in the court administration.

=== Chapter 7 ===
In 1183, the Taira gather a large army (mainly from the eastern provinces) and send it against Minamoto no Yoshinaka and Minamoto no Yoritomo. Going north, Taira armies pillage local villages. Taira no Tsunemasa visits an island to pray and compose a poem. At the Siege of Hiuchi, the Taira get help from a loyal abbot and defeat Yoshinaka's garrisons. Yoshinaka writes a petition at the Hachiman Shrine to get divine help for the upcoming battle. Yoshinaka attacks the Taira armies at night from the front and rear and forces them to retreat and descend to the Kurikara Valley, where most of the 70,000 Taira riders are crushed in layers (a famous "descent into Kurikara" – a major victory for Yoshinaka). At Shio-no-yama, Yoshinaka helps his uncle Yoshiie to defeat the Taira forces (Kiyomori's son Tomonori is killed in the battle). Taira armies are also defeated in the Battle of Shinohara. Yoshinaka wins Mount Hiei monks over to his side.

Taira no Munemori, head of the Taira, flees to the western provinces with Emperor Antoku and the Imperial Regalia (Retired Emperor Go-Shirakawa manages to escape in a different direction). Taira no Tadanori (Kiyomori's brother) flees the capital, having left behind some of his poems to a famous poet Fujiwara no Shunzei. Tsunemasa returns a famous lute to the Ninna-ji. At Fukuhara-kyō, Munemori gives a moving speech about duty to follow the Emperor, the Taira set fire to the palace and then flee from Fukuhara-kyō by boats to Kyūshū.

=== Chapter 8 ===
Retired Emperor Go-Shirakawa returns to the capital from Enryaku-ji together with Minamoto no Yoshinaka's armies. He installs a new emperor, Emperor Go-Toba, and puts the Taira out of government positions (they are designated as rebels).

The Taira want to set up a new capital in Kyūshū, but have to flee from local warriors who take the side of the Retired Emperor. They arrive to Yashima in Shikoku where they have to live in humble huts instead of palaces.

In late 1183, Minamoto no Yoritomo (still in Kamakura) is appointed by the Retired Emperor Go-Shirakawa as a "barbarian-subduing commander" (shōgun). Yoritomo receives the messenger from the capital with great courtesy, invites him to a feast and gives him many gifts. Yoritomo's manners sharply contrast with Minamoto no Yoshinaka's arrogant behaviour in the capital. Yoshinaka's rudeness and lack of knowledge about etiquette are shown to be ridiculous in several episodes (makes fun of courtiers, wears tasteless hunting robes, does not know how to get out of a carriage).

Meanwhile, the Taira regain their strength and assemble a strong army. Yoshinaka sends forces against them, but this time the Taira are victorious in the battle of Mizushima. Their influence grows even more after the victory at the Battle of Muroyama.

In the capital, Yoshinaka fights with Retired Emperor Go-Shirakawa (the battle at the Hōjūji) and takes control of the capital and the court by force. Minamoto no Yoritomo sends Minamoto no Yoshitsune to put an end to Yoshinaka's excesses.

=== Chapter 9 ===
When Minamoto no Yoshinaka prepares to march west against the Taira in early 1184, armies led by Minamoto no Yoshitsune arrive to strike him from the east. The struggle between the Minamoto forces follows. Yoshinaka tries to defend the capital, but Yoshitsune's warriors succeed in crossing the Uji River and defeating Yoshinaka's forces at Uji and Seta. Yoshitsune takes control of the capital and guards the mansion of the Retired Emperor Go-Shirakawa, not letting Yoshinaka's men capture him. Yoshinaka barely breaks through the enemy forces. He meets with his foster-brother Imai Kanehira and they try to escape from pursuing enemy forces. In a famous scene, Yoshinaka is killed when his horse is stuck in the muddy field. Kanehira fights his last battle and commits suicide.

While the Minamoto fight among themselves in the capital, the Taira move back to Fukuhara and set up defences at the Ichi-no-tani stronghold (near what is now Suma-ku, Kobe). Minamoto no Yoshitsune's armies move west to attack the Taira from the rear whereas his half-brother Noriyori advances to attack the Taira camp from the east. Yoshitsune, planning a surprise attack on Ichi-no-tani from the west, follows an old horse that guides his forces through the mountains.

Meanwhile, fierce fighting starts at Ikuta-no-mori and Ichi-no-tani, but neither side is able to gain a decisive advantage. Yoshitsune's cavalry descends a steep slope at Hiyodori Pass decisively attacking the Taira from the rear. The Taira panic and flee to the boats. As the battle continues, Taira no Tadanori (Kiyomori's brother who visited the poet Shunzei) is killed. Taira no Shigehira (Kiyomori's son who burned Nara), deserted by his men at Ikuta-no-mori, is captured alive trying to commit suicide.

In a famous passage, Taira no Atsumori (young nephew of Kiyomori) is challenged to a fight by a warrior, Kumagai Naozane. Naozane overpowers him, but then hesitates to kill him since he reminds him of his own young son. Seeing the approaching riders who are going to kill the youth, Naozane kills Atsumori, and finds his flute (later he becomes a Buddhist monk). The Taira are defeated and flee by boats in different directions.

=== Chapter 10 ===
In 1184, Taira no Shigehira (captured alive) and the heads of the defeated Taira are paraded in the streets of the capital. The Retired Emperor Go-Shirakawa offers the Taira to exchange Three Imperial Treasures for Shigehira, but they refuse. It is clear that he will be executed. Shigehira, concerned about his past arrogance and evil deeds (burning of Nara temples), wants to devote himself to Buddhism. Hōnen (the founder of the Pure Land Buddhism in Japan) concisely outlines the essential doctrines (reciting Amida's name, repentance, deep faith guarantee rebirth in the Pure Land). Shigehira is sent to Kamakura. On his journey along the Eastern Sea Road, Shigehira passes numerous places that evoke historical and literary associations.

Minamoto no Yoritomo receives Shigehira, who claims that burning Nara temples was an accident. Before being sent to the Nara monks, Shigehira is treated well at Izu (a bath is prepared for him, wine is served, a beautiful lady serving Yoritomo, Senju-no-mae, sings several songs (with Buddhist meaning) and plays the lute; Shigehira also sings and plays the lute – after Shigehira's execution, Senju-no-mae becomes a nun).

At Yashima, Taira no Koremori, grandson of Taira no Kiyomori, is grieved to be away from his family in the capital. He secretly leaves Yashima and travels to Mt. Kōya. There he meets with a holy man, Takiguchi Tokiyori.

A story of his tragic love is inserted: as a courtier, Tokiyori loved a girl of lesser birth, Yokobue. His father was against their marriage and Tokiyori became a monk. When Yokobue came looking for him, he was firm and did not come out. He went to Mt. Kōya and became a respected priest Takiguchi. Yokobue became a nun and died soon. Koremori comes to this priest, becomes a monk himself and goes on a pilgrimage to Kumano. After the priest's encouraging Pure Land Buddhist teachings, Koremori abandons his attachments, throws himself into the sea and drowns. News of his death reaches Yashima (Taira camp). The Taira are attacked at Fujito and retreat.

=== Chapter 11 ===
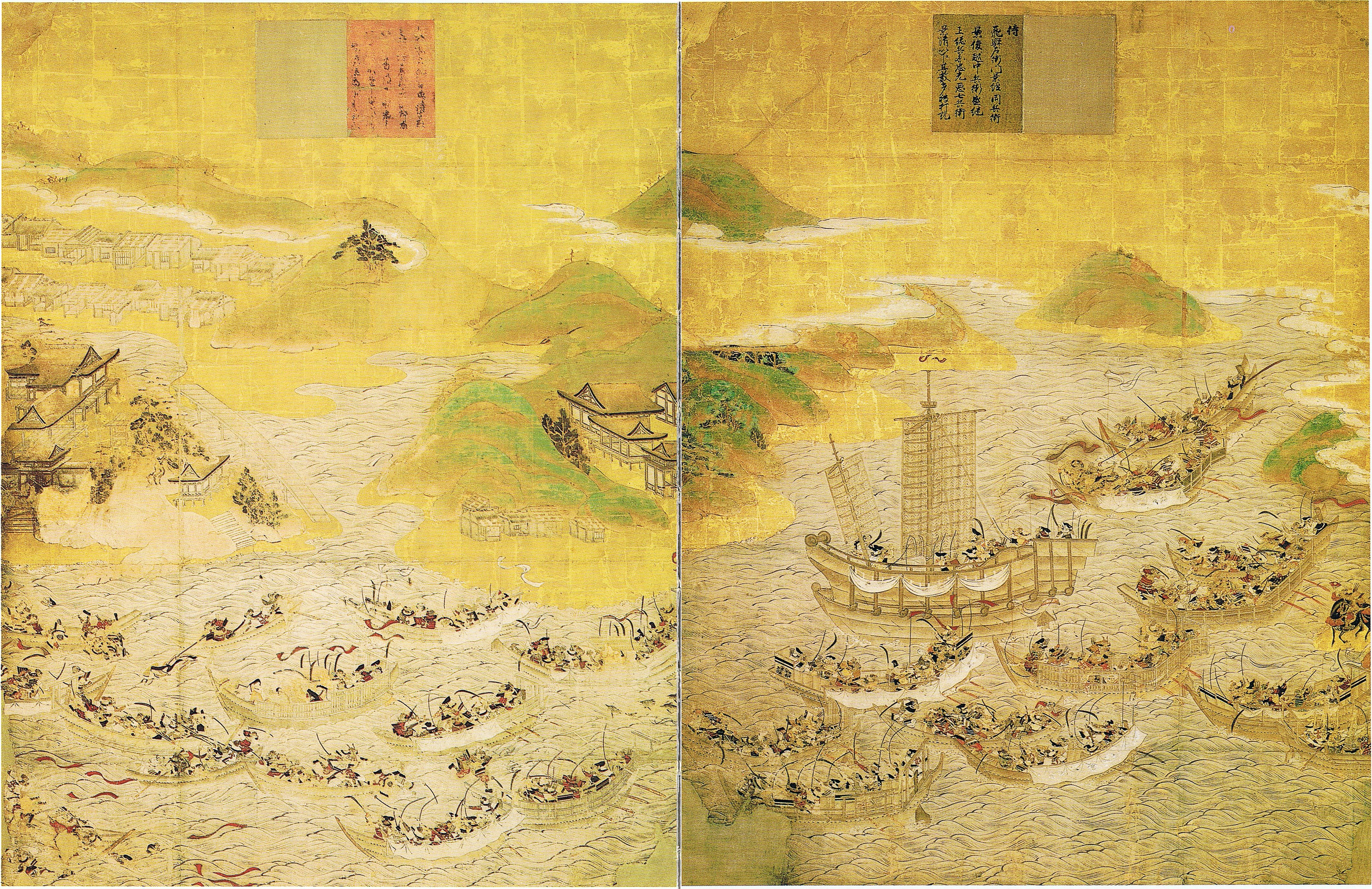
Battle of Dan-no-ura (1185）

In 1185, a small force led by Minamoto no Yoshitsune lands on the island of Shikoku. Yoshitsune plans a surprise attack from the rear (one more time after the Battle of Ichi-no-Tani) on the Taira stronghold at the Battle of Yashima. The Taira, thinking that main Minamoto forces attack them, flee to their boats in panic. The Taira warriors shoot arrows at the Yoshitsune's forces. Taira no Noritsune, Kiyomori's nephew and a commander of the Taira, shoots at Minamoto no Yoshitsune, but Tsuginobu, Yoshitsune's retainer, dies protecting him from arrows.

In a famous passage, a Taira lady in a boat holds a fan as a challenge to the Minamoto warriors and Nasu no Yoichi, a skillful young Minamoto archer, hits the fan with his arrow.

During the confused fighting at the shore, Yoshitsune loses his bow and, risking his life, gets it back. He famously explains that he did not want the Taira to have it and laugh at him. The Taira are forced to leave Shikoku and retreat to Nagato Province on the southern tip of Honshū.

Before the final Battle of Dan-no-ura, the Minamoto gain new allies: the head of the Kumano shrines decides to support the Minamoto after fortune-telling with cockfights (200 boats) and 150 boats from a province of Shikoku. In total, the Minamoto have about 3000 vessels against the Taira's 1000.

Before the battle, Yoshitsune argues about leading the attack and almost fights with Kajiwara Kagetoki (Minamoto commander jealous of Yoshitsune).

As the battle begins, the Taira are in good spirits and seem to be winning due to skillful positioning of archers on the boats. After the exchange of arrows from a distance main forces begin fighting. A number of Heavenly omens (white banner descends on a Minamoto boat, a multitude of dolphins swimming to the Taira boats) indicate that the Minamoto will win. Taguchi Shigeyoshi from Awa Province betrays the Taira and informs the Minamoto about the boats carrying the main Taira forces in disguise. Warriors from Shikoku and Kyūshū also switch sides and support the Minamoto.

In the famous and tragic passage, Kiyomori's widow, holding young Emperor Antoku in her arms, commits suicide by drowning. Many Taira are killed or commit suicide at Dan-no-ura. Tomomori (Kiyomori's son) drowns himself. Taira no Noritsune, Kiyomori's nephew and a strong warrior, after not fighting Minamoto no Yoshitsune, dies fighting bravely. Taira clan head Taira no Munemori, Taira no Tokuko, Kiyomori's daughter, are captured alive.

After the battle, Yoshitsune returns to the capital with the Imperial Treasures with prisoners. The sacred sword has been lost. Captured Taira are paraded along the streets of the capital. Many spectators pity their fate. Yoshitsune delivers Munemori to Minamoto no Yoritomo in Kamakura, but after Kajiwara Kagetoki's slander, Yoritomo suspects Yoshitsune of treachery and prevents him from entering Kamakura. Minamoto no Yoshitsune writes the Letter from Koshigoe listing his military deeds and loyal service. Yoritomo still sends him back to the capital. Taira no Munemori and his son Kiyomune are executed, their heads hung near a prison gate in the capital.

Taira no Shigehira (Taira no Kiyomori's son captured at the Battle of Ichi-no-Tani) is allowed to see his wife before being handed over to Nara monks. Shigehira hopes for Amitābha's compassion and rebirth in Sukhavati, the pure land of Amitābha. Warriors execute him in front of the monks. His head is nailed near the temple at Nara. After cremating the head and body, his wife becomes a nun.

=== Chapter 12 ===
A powerful earthquake strikes the capital. Minamoto no Yoritomo's distrust of Minamoto no Yoshitsune grows. Yoritomo makes an attempted assassination of Yoshitsune. Then, Yoritomo kills Yoshitsune's half brother Minamoto no Noriyori, who is reluctant to go against Yoshitsune. When Yoritomo sends a large force led by Hōjō Tokimasa against him, Yoshitsune flees from the capital to a northern province.

Taking control of the capital, Tokimasa executes all potential heirs to the Taira family. An informer shows the cloister where Koremori's family, including Rokudai, is hiding. Rokudai (age 12) is the last male heir of the Taira family. Rokudai is arrested, but his nurse finds Mongaku (the monk, introduced in Chapter 5), who agrees to go to Kamakura to ask for a pardon. Mongaku comes back with a letter from Yoritomo and saves Rokudai just before his execution takes place. Yoritomo has doubts about Rokudai and is forced to become a monk (1189, age 16). Rokudai visits Mt. Kōya and Kumano, where his father Koremori drowned.

Meanwhile, several Taira clan members are found and executed. In 1192, Retired Emperor Go-Shirakawa dies (age 66). Yoritomo, still suspicious, orders the execution of Rokudai (aged 30 or over), and the Taira line comes to an end.

After Yoritomo's death in 1199, the monk Mongaku plans a rebellion to install a prince on the throne. His plot is uncovered and the Retired Emperor Go-Toba exiles him to the island of Oki (age 80 or over).

=== The Initiates' Book ===
Treated as a secret text by [a group of biwahōshi], this chapter is believed to have originated in the late 13th century, after the Heike proper. [...] It brings together information about Kiyomori's daughter Kenreimon'in, the mother of Emperor Antoku. [...] It constitutes a single literary entity – a tale in the old monogatari style, rich in poetic imagery, rhythmic passages, waka, and melancholy associations.

In 1185, Taira no Tokuko becomes a nun and moves to an old hut near the capital. Her life is filled with sadness as memories of the past glory haunt her. After the 1185 earthquake, the hut is ruined.

In the autumn of 1185, Taira no Tokuko moves to a remote Buddhist retreat at Jakkō-in in the Ohara mountains to avoid public attention. There she devotes herself to Buddhist practices. Natural sights evoke images of Sukhavati and impermanence in her mind.

In the spring of 1186, Retired Emperor Go-Shirakawa makes a visit to the mountain retreat. She talks with the Retired Emperor about human miseries and Buddhist ideas of suffering and rebirth in the pure land.

As she remembers past glory of the Taira and their fall, she makes parallels between the events in her life and the six realms of rebirth. She also mentions a dream in which she saw the Taira in the dragon king's palace asking her to pray for their salvation.

The bell of the Jakkō-in sounds (parallel to the bells of the Gion monastery in the first lines of the Tale) and the Retired Emperor leaves for the capital. Misfortunes of the Taira are blamed on Taira no Kiyomori (his evil deeds caused the suffering of the whole Taira clan). In 1191, Tokuko falls ill, dies invoking Amitābha's name and is welcomed by Amitābha to Sukhavati.

== See also ==
- List of The Tale of the Heike characters
- Hōgen rebellion, 1156
  - The Tale of Hōgen or Hōgen monogatari
- Heiji rebellion, 1159–1160
  - The Tale of Heiji or Heiji monogatari
- Genpei War, 1180–1185
- Heikegani
- Hoichi the Earless
- The Heike Story (2016 novel translated into modern Japanese, adapted into a 2021 anime)
- Genji: Dawn of the Samurai (video game)
- Genji: Days of the Blade (video game)
