= 1185 =

1185 in various calendars
- Gregorian calendar: 1185; MCLXXXV
- Ab urbe condita: 1938
- Armenian calendar: 634; ԹՎ ՈԼԴ
- Assyrian calendar: 5935
- Balinese saka calendar: 1106–1107
- Bengali calendar: 591–592
- Berber calendar: 2135
- English Regnal year: 31 Hen. 2 – 32 Hen. 2
- Buddhist calendar: 1729
- Burmese calendar: 547
- Byzantine calendar: 6693–6694
- Chinese calendar: 甲辰年 (Wood Dragon); 3882 or 3675 — to — 乙巳年 (Wood Snake); 3883 or 3676
- Coptic calendar: 901–902
- Discordian calendar: 2351
- Ethiopian calendar: 1177–1178
- Hebrew calendar: 4945–4946
- Hindu calendars
- Vikram Samvat: 1241–1242
- Shaka Samvat: 1106–1107
- Kali Yuga: 4285–4286
- Holocene calendar: 11185
- Igbo calendar: 185–186
- Iranian calendar: 563–564
- Islamic calendar: 580–581
- Japanese calendar: Genryaku 2 / Bunji 1 (文治元年)
- Javanese calendar: 1092–1093
- Julian calendar: 1185; MCLXXXV
- Korean calendar: 3518
- Minguo calendar: 727 before ROC 民前727年
- Nanakshahi calendar: −283
- Seleucid era: 1496/1497 AG
- Thai solar calendar: 1727–1728
- Tibetan calendar: ཤིང་ཕོ་འབྲུག་ལོ་ (male Wood-Dragon); 1311 or 930 or 158 — to — ཤིང་མོ་སྦྲུལ་ལོ་ (female Wood-Snake); 1312 or 931 or 159

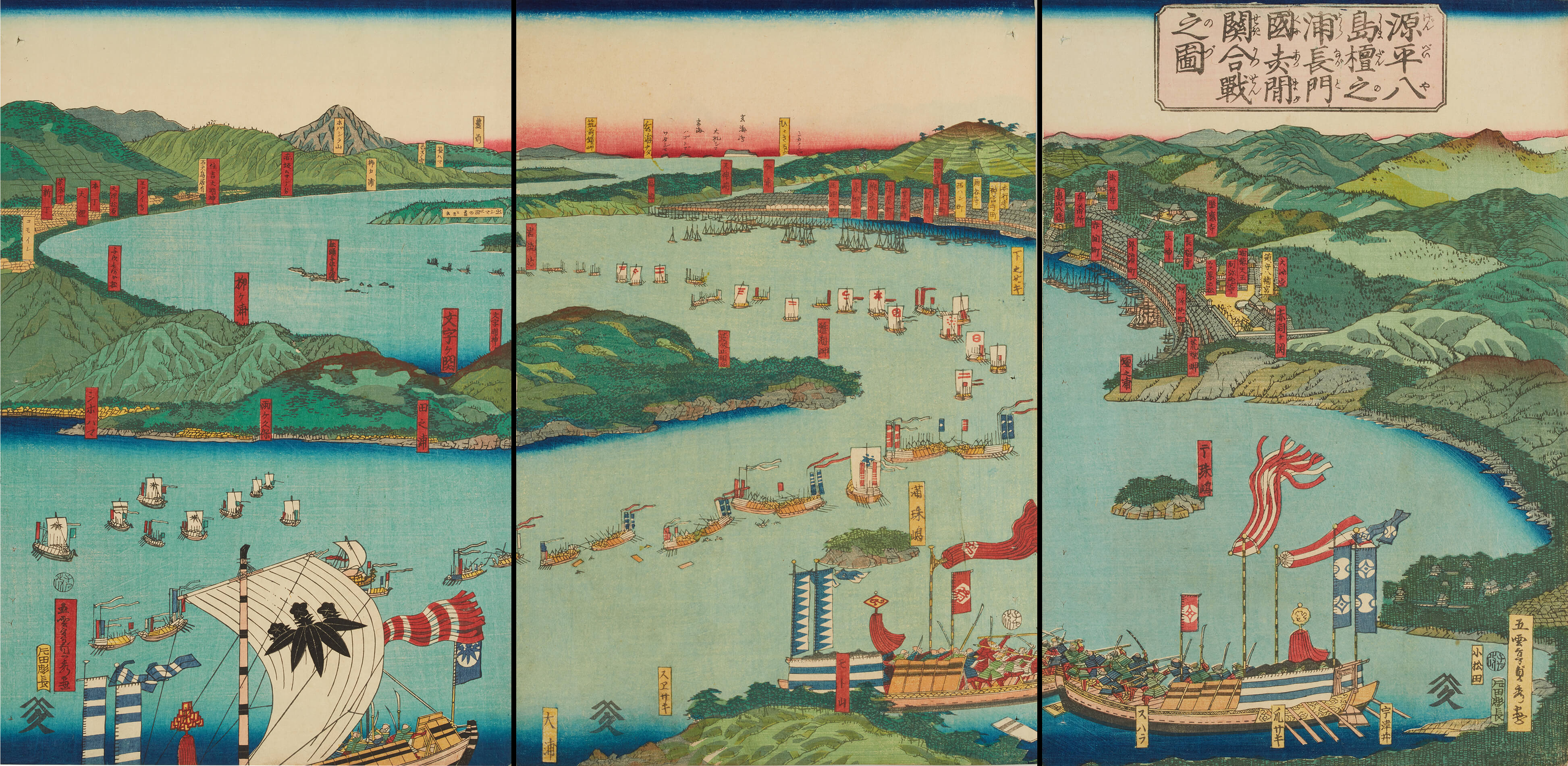
Battle of Dan-no-ura in Honshu (1185).

Year 1185 (MCLXXXV) was a common year starting on Tuesday of the Julian calendar.

== Events ==
=== By place ===
==== Byzantine Empire ====
- August – King William II of Sicily ("the Good") lands in Epirus with a Siculo-Norman expeditionary force of 200 ships and 80,000 men (including 5,000 knights) and marches as far as the Byzantine city of Thessaloniki, which he takes and pillages, massacring some 7,000 Greek citizens.
- September 11–12 – Isaac II Angelos leads a revolt in Constantinople and deposes Emperor Andronikos I Komnenos. Andronikos tries in vain to flee across Asia but is captured and killed by an angry mob. Isaac is proclaimed emperor, ending the Komnenos Dynasty.
- November 7 – Battle of Demetritzes: A reinforced Byzantine army under Alexios Branas decisively defeats William II, ending his invasion of the Byzantine Empire. Thessaloniki is recaptured, and the Normans are pushed back to Italy. Many Norman ships are lost to storms.
- Uprising of Asen and Peter: Peter and Ivan Asen lead a revolt of the Vlachs and Bulgars against the Byzantine Empire, eventually establishing the Second Bulgarian Empire.

==== Levant ====
- March 16 – The 23-year-old Baldwin IV of Jerusalem ("the Leper King") dies of leprosy after a 10-year reign. He is succeeded by his 8-year-old nephew, Baldwin V, as the sole ruler of Jerusalem under the regency of Count Raymond of Tripoli. The child-king becomes a pawn in the politics of the kingdom, between his mother Sibylla of Jerusalem (sister of Baldwin IV) and her younger half-sister Isabella I.
- Saladin agrees to a 4-year truce due to severe drought and famine which has struck Palestine. The treaty is signed by Count Raymond of Tripoli and important nobles from Jerusalem. Commerce is renewed between the Crusader states and their Muslim neighbors. A flow of corn from the east saves the Crusaders and the population from starvation.

==== British Isles ====
- April 25 – John's first expedition to Ireland: King Henry II of England knights his son and heir, the 18-year-old Prince John, newly created Lord of Ireland, and sends him to Ireland, accompanied by 300 knights and a team of administrators to enforce English control. Landing at Waterford, he treats the local Irish rulers with contempt, making fun of their unfashionable long beards. Also failing to make allies amongst the Anglo-Norman settlers, the English army is unable to subdue the Irish fighters in unfamiliar conditions and the expedition soon becomes a complete disaster. In December, John returns to England in defeat. Nonetheless, Henry gets him named 'King of Ireland' by Pope Urban III and procures a golden crown with peacock feathers.
- April 15 – 1185 East Midlands earthquake occurs. It is the first earthquake in England for which there are reliable reports indicating the damage, which includes destruction of Lincoln Cathedral.

==== Europe ====
- July – Treaty of Boves: King Philip II of France signs a treaty to ensure his authority over his vassals, with Amiénois, Artois and other places in northern France passing to him. Philip is given the nickname "Augustus" by the monk Rigord for augmenting French lands.
- August 15 – The cave monastery of Vardzia is consecrated by Queen Tamar of Georgia. She marries Yury Bogolyubsky, Grand Prince of Novgorod.
- September – Henry the Lion, duke of Saxony, returns to Germany after being banished for three years by Frederick Barbarossa, Holy Roman Emperor.
- December 6 – King Afonso I of Portugal ("the Great") dies after a 36-year reign. He is succeeded by his son Sancho I ("the Populator") as ruler of Portugal.
- Igor Svyatoslavich's failed campaign against the Cumans, later immortalized in The Tale of Igor's Campaign, takes place this year.

==== Africa ====
- The Almohad forces under Caliph Yaqub al-Mansur reconquer Béjaïa and Algiers, that have been taken by the Banu Ghaniya, descendants of the Almoravids.

==== Asia ====
- March 22 – Battle of Yashima: Japanese forces (with some 140 ships, 1,000 cavalry and 30,000 horses) under Minamoto no Yoshitsune defeat the Taira clan just off Shikoku in the Seto Inland Sea.
- April 25 – Battle of Dan-no-ura: The Japanese fleet (some 300 ships) led by Minamoto no Yoshitsune defeats the fleet of the Taira clan in the Shimonoseki Strait.
- December – Retired Emperor Go-Shirakawa grants Minamoto no Yoritomo the authority to form the first bakufu (shogunate) in Japan, ending the Genpei War.

=== By topic ===
==== Astronomy ====
- May 1 – The Solar eclipse of May 1, 1185, visible across Central America, Northern and Eastern Europe and Kazakhstan, occurs.

==== Markets ====
- Evidence is first uncovered that Henry II of England is using the safes of the Temple Church in London (consecrated February 10), under the guard of the Knights Templar, to store part of his treasure.

==== Religion ====
- November 25 – Pope Lucius III dies after a 4-year pontificate in exile at Verona. He is succeeded by Urban III as the 172nd pope of the Catholic Church (until 1187).

== Births ==
- April 23 – Afonso II ("the Fat"), king of Portugal (d. 1223)
- Alexander of Hales, English philosopher (d. 1245)
- Angelus of Jerusalem, Israeli priest and martyr (d. 1220)
- Dietrich V, German nobleman (approximate date)
- Engelbert II, archbishop of Cologne (approximate date)
- Fujiwara no Reishi, Japanese empress consort (d. 1243)
- Gerard III, count of Guelders and Zutphen (d. 1229)
- Gertrude of Merania, queen of Hungary (d. 1213)
- Inge II (Bårdsson), king of Norway (d. 1217)
- Michael of Chernigov, Kievan Grand Prince (d. 1246)
- Patrick II, Earl of Dunbar, Anglo-Scottish nobleman (d. 1249)
- Raymond Roger Trencavel, French nobleman (d. 1209)
- Robert III, count of Dreux and Braine (d. 1234)
- Shams Tabrizi, Persian poet and writer (d. 1248)
- Tancred of Siena, Italian missionary (d. 1241)

== Deaths ==
- February 9 – Theodoric I, margrave of Lusatia (b. 1130)
- March 16 – Baldwin IV ("the Leper King"), king of Jerusalem (b. 1161)
- March 22 – Satō Tsugunobu, Japanese warrior (b. 1158)
- April 25 – Battle of Dan-no-ura:
  - Antoku, child-emperor of Japan (b. 1178)
  - Taira no Tokiko, Japanese Buddhist nun (b. 1126)
  - Taira no Norimori, Japanese nobleman (b. 1128)
  - Taira no Noritsune, Japanese nobleman (b. 1160)
  - Taira no Tomomori, Japanese nobleman (b. 1152)
  - Taira no Tsunemori, Japanese nobleman (b. 1124)
- June 16 – Richeza of Poland, queen consort of Castile (b. 1140)
- May 30 – Constantine Makrodoukas, Byzantine nobleman
- June 19 – Taira no Munemori, Japanese samurai (b. 1147)
- July 18 – Stefan, archbishop of Uppsala (b. before 1143)
- September 11 – Stephen Hagiochristophorites, Byzantine official
- September 12 – Andronikos I Komnenos, Byzantine emperor, assassinated (b. 1118)
- September – John Komnenos (son of Andronikos I), Byzantine co-emperor, assassinated (b. 1159)
- November 25 – Lucius III, pope of the Catholic Church (b. 1097)
- December 6 – Afonso I ("the Great"), king of Portugal (b. 1109)
- Abd Allah Al-Suhayli, Moorish scholar and writer (b. 1114)
- Bhāskara ("the Teacher"), Indian mathematician (b. 1114)
- Fernando Rodríguez de Castro, Spanish nobleman (b. 1125) (after August 16)
- Ibn Tufail, Arab-Andalusian polymath and writer (b. 1105)
- Máel Íosa Ua Dálaigh, Irish Ollamh Érenn (chief bard)
- Taira no Shigehira, Japanese general, executed (b. 1158)
