= Tottori Castle =

Castle ruins in Tottori, Japan

- 鳥取城
- Tottori, Tottori Prefecture, Japan
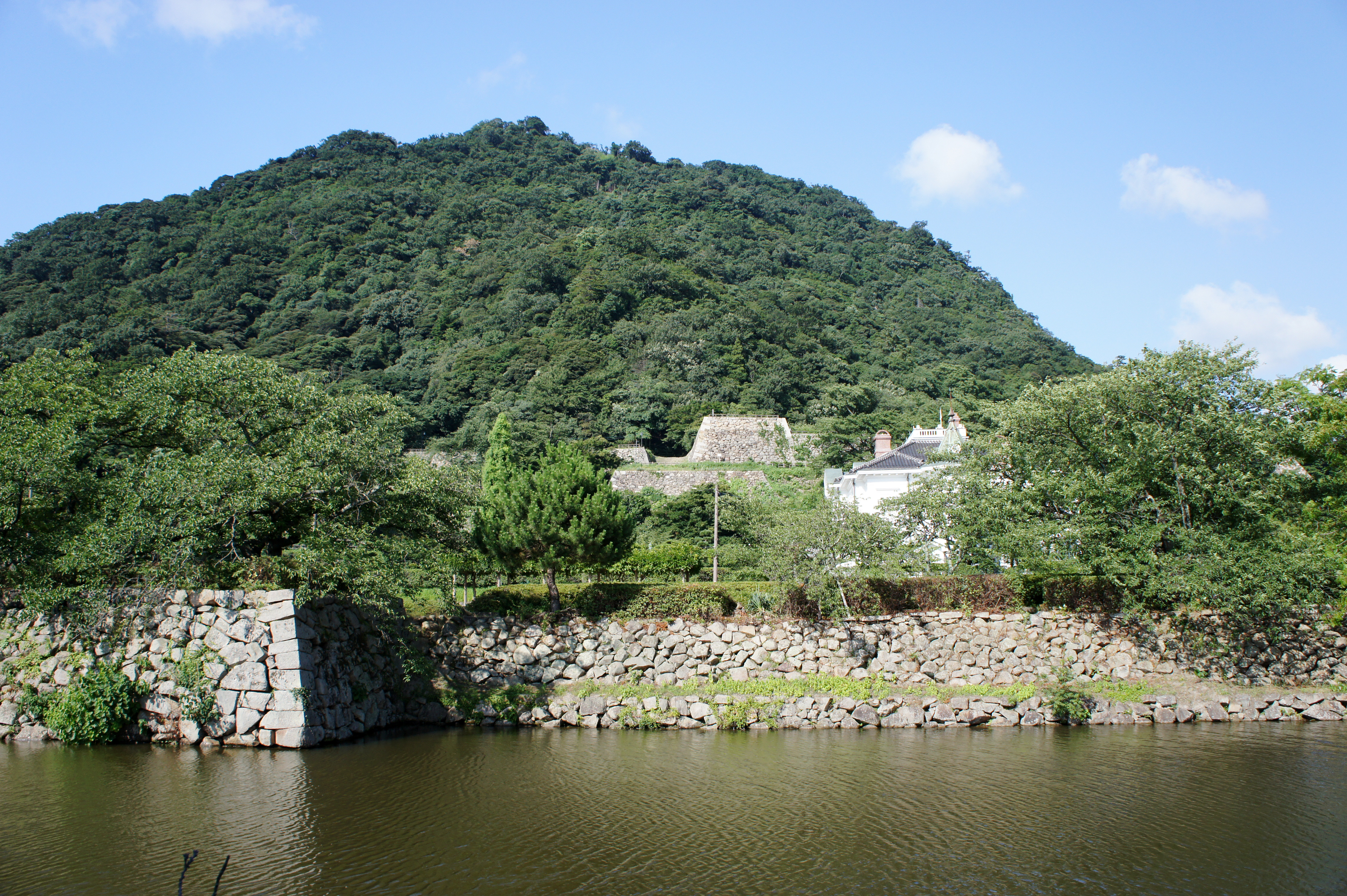
- Former site of Tottori Castle

Site information
- Type: Japanese castle
- Controlled by: Ikeda clan
- Condition: Ruins

Location
- Tottori Castle
- Location within Tottori Prefecture Location within Japan
- Coordinates: 35°30′26.73″N 134°14′24.0″E

Site history
- Built: 1532-1555
- Demolished: 1879
- Battles/wars: Siege of Tottori

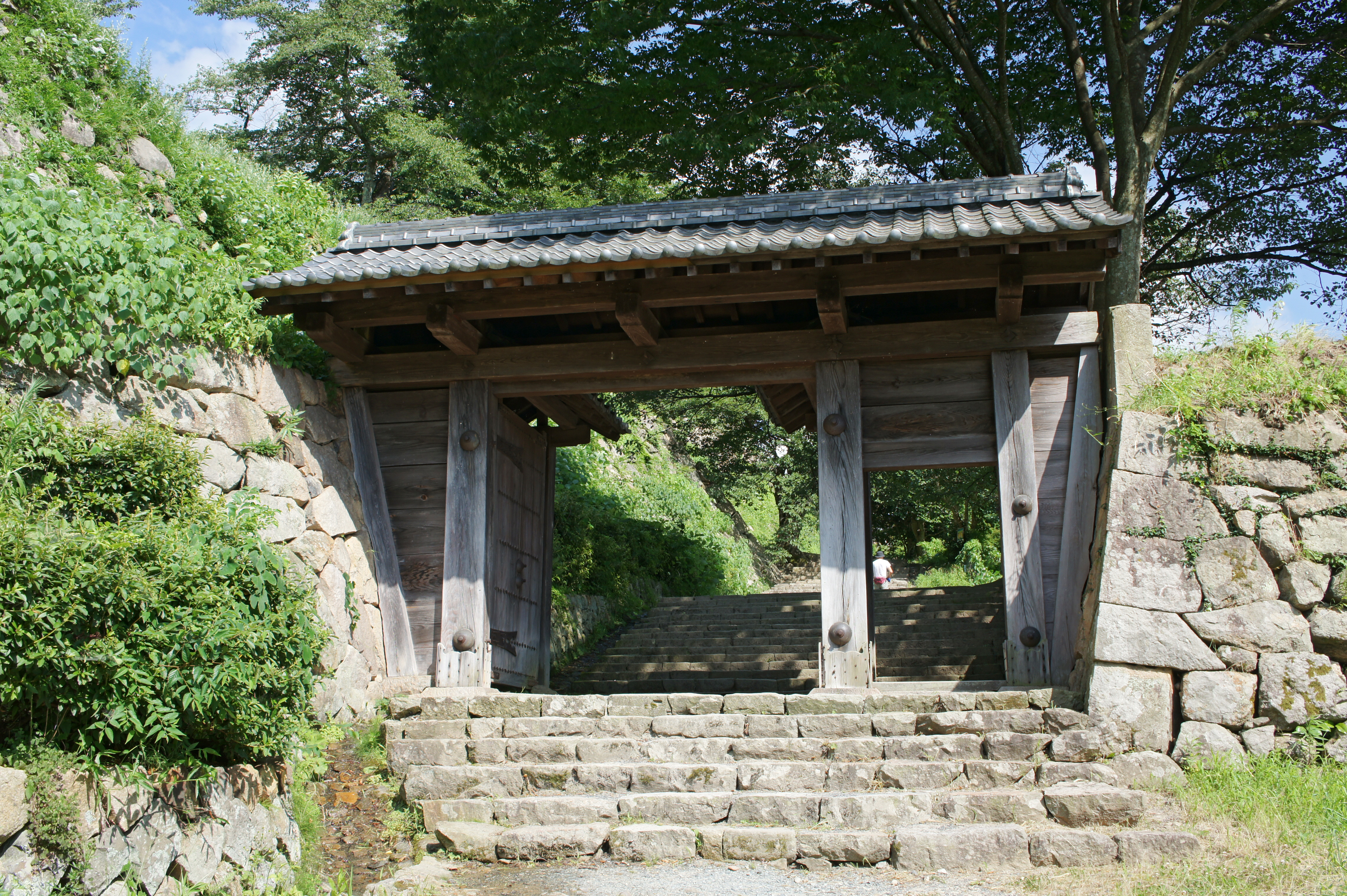
A gate leading into the castle grounds

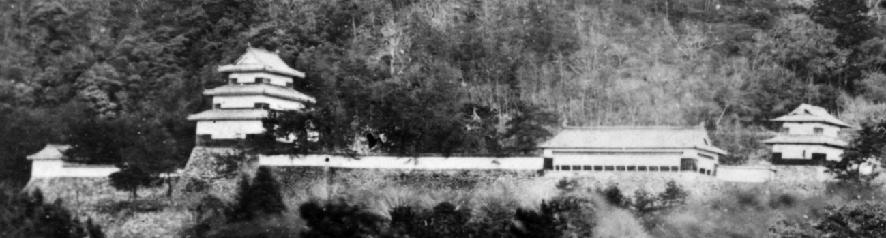
Tottori Castle's outer citadel (ninomaru) before demolition

Tottori Castle (鳥取城, Tottori-jō) was a Japanese castle located in Tottori, Tottori Prefecture in the San'in Region of western Japan. It has been protected by the central government as a National Historic Site since 1957 with the area under protection expanded in 1987. The Historical Site designation also includes the Taikōganaru (太閤ヶ平) fortification erected by Toyotomi Hideyoshi during the 1581 Siege of Tottori.

== History ==
Tottori Castle was constructed in Inaba Province during the Sengoku period as a yamashiro ("mountain castle") built into the mountain itself, using natural obstacles and defenses to a greater extent than man-made walls. The castle is located to the north the center of modern Tottori on Mount Kyusho, which has steep slopes. It is claimed that in the late 12th century, following the Genpei War, the new Shōgun Minamoto no Yoritomo granted the position of shugo of Inaba Province to Nasu no Yoichi, the hero of the Battle of Yashima. Nasu lost the castle soon afterwards to Kajiwara Kagetoki in a hunting competition. However, the castle in its present form was constructed by the Yamana clan from 1532 to 1555. In the early Muromachi period, the Yamana once held the position of shugo over most of the San'in and the San'yō region, but their hold over Inaba Province itself was weak following the Onin War and the castle was built to counter the increasingly aggressive Amago clan from Izumo, who had seized neighboring Hōki Province from the Yamana and who were now threatening their home province of Tajima. The Amago were defeated by the Mōri clan of Aki Province in 1566 and Inaba Province became a battleground between the Mōri, the remnants of the Amago, and the waning power of the Yamana, who under Yamana Toyokuni moved clan's main stronghold to Tottori castle from Tenjinyama castle in 1573. The castle fell to the Mōri in 1575; however, by seizing Inaba and parts of Harima Province, the Mōri came into conflict with the rapidly increasing power of Oda Nobunaga. In 1577, Nobunaga dispatched an army under Hashiba Hideyoshi to conquer the Mōri.

Hideyoshi's campaign took several years. In 1577 he first had to suppress revolts at Miki Castle in Harima and Arioka Castle in Settsu Province; he completed his conquest of Tajima Province (with its silver mines) in 1580 and Harima Province in 1581, and persuaded the Nanjō clan (who controlled Hōki Province) and Ukita Naoie (who controlled Mimasaka and Bizen Provinces to defect from the Mōri. In 1581 the Mōri responded by appointing Kikkawa Tsuneie to Tottori Castle with an army of 3000 men. Rather than attack the reputedly impregnable Tottori Castle by frontal assault, Hideyoshi opted for siege warfare. He purchased all available rice and other foodstuffs in Inaba Province for very high prices. He also built a semi-circular 12-kilometer long encampment called the Taikoganaru (太閤ヶ平) on three sides of the castle to isolate it from the town and any supplies or reinforcement. With little food and no hope of reinforcement, the castle surrendered after three months and Kikkawa Tsuneie was forced to commit seppuku.

After taking the castle without damage, Hideyoshi assigned it to his general, Miyabe Keihin. However, after his death and the Battle of Sekigahara in 1600, Tokugawa Ieyasu reassigned the castle to Ikeda Mitsumasa in 1616. As daimyō of Tottori Domain, which ruled both Inaba and Hōki Provinces, Ikeda Mitsumasa greatly expanded upon and rebuilt Tottori Castle with stone walls and water moats. The mountain areas of the castle, including its original inner bailey were abandoned, but at the lower levels a three-story tenshu was constructed. The castle remained in the hands of a branch of the Ikeda clan to the end of the Edo Period.

Following the Meiji restoration, Tottori Castle was given to the Ministry of the Army in 1873, coming under the jurisdiction of the Imperial Japanese Army's 4th Division. In 1876, the Ministry of the Army decided to dismantle Tottori Castle when Tottori Prefecture was incorporated into Shimane Prefecture, arguing that no castle was needed except in the prefectural capital, Matsue. In 1879, the demolition of Tottori Castle began, though Tottori Prefecture was later re-established in 1881. Little remains of the castle aside from parts of the stone wall and one gate, reinforced with iron and featuring spikes on the outside of the doors to help protect against attackers.The site became a park and grounds for a high school.

Tottori Castle was listed as one of Japan's Top 100 Castles by the Japan Castle Foundation in 2006.

The castle ruins are a 30-minute walk from Tottori Station on the JR West San'in Main Line.

== See also ==
- List of Historic Sites of Japan (Tottori)
- Siege of Tottori

== Literature ==
- Benesch, Oleg and Ran Zwigenberg (2019). Japan's Castles: Citadels of Modernity in War and Peace. Cambridge: Cambridge University Press. p. 374. ISBN 9781108481946.
- De Lange, William (2021). An Encyclopedia of Japanese Castles. Groningen: Toyo Press. pp. 600 pages. ISBN 978-9492722300.
- Schmorleitz, Morton S. (1974). Castles in Japan. Tokyo: Charles E. Tuttle Co. ISBN 0-8048-1102-4.
