= Genkurō =

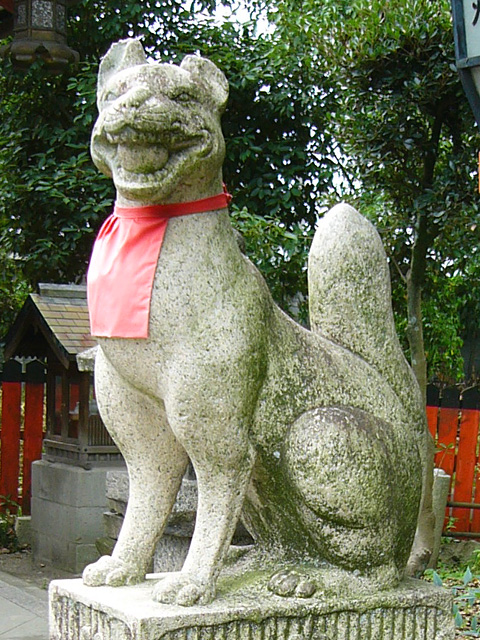

Genkurō (源九郎) is a shape-changing kitsune (fox-spirit) character who features prominently in the famous jōruri and kabuki play Yoshitsune Senbon Zakura ("Yoshitsune and the Thousand Cherry Trees").

Disguising himself as Satō Tadanobu, a retainer of Yoshitsune's, he rescues Yoshitsune's lover Shizuka Gozen from agents of Yoritomo (Yoshitsune's brother, from whom he is fleeing). In return, he is awarded a suit of armor, and also the great honor of Yoshitsune's name, "Genkurō", meaning Minamoto (源, gen) ninth son (九郎, ku-rō). As a kitsune, with no other name of his own revealed throughout the play, he is known only as "Tadanobu" and as "Genkurō".

Separating from Yoshitsune and his party, Genkurō, his true identity still unknown, escorts Shizuka to Yoshino, seeking escape and safety from the agents of Yoritomo. There, they meet up with Yoshitsune once more, both parties having taken separate, likely somewhat circuitous routes, to arrive at the same place. However, since Yoshitsune has now come to be accompanied by the true Satō Tadanobu, Genkurō is forced to reveal himself. His transformation into his fox-spirit form, along with the dance and monologue which follow, are considered the highlights of the play. He explains that the Hatsune Drum, given to Yoshitsune at the beginning of the play and playing a key role in Yoshitsune's emotional and moral torment throughout the drama, is made from the skins of his parents, 1000-year-old foxes whose magical spirits still inhabit the drum. Longing for his parents for four hundred years (the play takes place in 1186, and the drum was crafted by the Emperor Kanmu as part of a ritual to pray for rain in 786), the drum had been kept in the Imperial Palace, guarded by a multitude of kami, and was thus inaccessible to him. But when it was removed from the palace, he continues to explain, he followed it into Yoshitsune's hands, and took on the form of Tadanobu in order to get close to it.

The dance and monologue end with the fox making a grand exit. Traditionally in kabuki he would run down the hanamichi, a platform that extends through the audience to the rear of the theater, exiting in a special dance called a kitsune-roppō (狐六法, "fox six-direction steps"), however it has become increasingly popular in recent decades for the special effect of chūnori (宙乗り) to be used: the actor portraying Genkurō flies out over the audience, hoisted up on wires. A similar technique has come to be used in bunraku puppet theatre as well, in which wires are used to lift the fox puppeteer (and, of course, the puppet as well) up off the stage.

Invisible, he then uses his magics to defend Yoshitsune, and returns, visible in the form of Tadanobu, to help the real Tadanobu in achieving revenge upon Taira no Noritsune, who killed his brother Satō Tsuginobu at the battle of Yashima. Vanishing to escape Noritsune's blade, Genkurō is not seen again, and his fate is left unclear at the end of the play.
