= Kajiwara =

Kajiwara (written: 梶原) is a Japanese surname. Notable people with the surname include:

- Kajiwara Heima (梶原 平馬, c. 1842 – 1889), Japanese samurai
- Ikki Kajiwara (梶原 一騎, 1936–1987), Japanese writer
- Kajiwara Kagesue (梶原 景季, 1162–1200), Japanese samurai
- Kajiwara Kagetoki (梶原 景時, c. 1162 – 1200), Japanese samurai
- Noriko Kajiwara (梶原 紀子), Japanese Paralympic swimmer
- Takeo Kajiwara (梶原 武雄, 1923–2009), Japanese Go player
- Takuma Kajiwara (梶原 琢磨, c. 1877–1960), American artist and photographer
- Tetsuya Kajiwara (musician) (梶原 徹也, born 1963), Japanese musician
- Zen Kajiwara (梶原 善, born 1966), Japanese actor
- Daiki Kajiwara (梶原 大暉, born 2001), Japanese para badminton player
