= Tenjinyama Castle =

Tenjinyama Castle (天神山城, Tenjinyama-jō) is the name of many castles in Japan.

- Tenjinyama Castle (Kazusa) in Futtsu, Chiba Prefecture (formerly Kazusa Province)
- Tenjinyama Castle (Musashi) in Nagatoro, Saitama Prefecture (formerly Musashi Province)
- Tenjinyama Castle (Echigo) in Nishikan-ku, Niigata Prefecture (formerly Echigo Province)
- Tenjinyama Castle (Etchū) in Uozu, Toyama Prefecture (formerly Etchū Province)
- Tenjinyama Castle (Inaba) in Gobō, Tottori Prefecture (formerly Inaba Province)
- Tenjinyama Castle (Bizen) in Okayama, Okayama Prefecture (formerly Bizen Province)
- Tenjinyama Castle (Sanuki) in Mitoyo, Kagawa Prefecture (formerly Sanuki Province)
- Tenjinyama Castle (Aki) in Akitakata, Hiroshima Prefecture (formerly Aki Province)
