= Nasu no Yoichi =

Famous Samurai Archer during the Heian Period (794 - 1185)

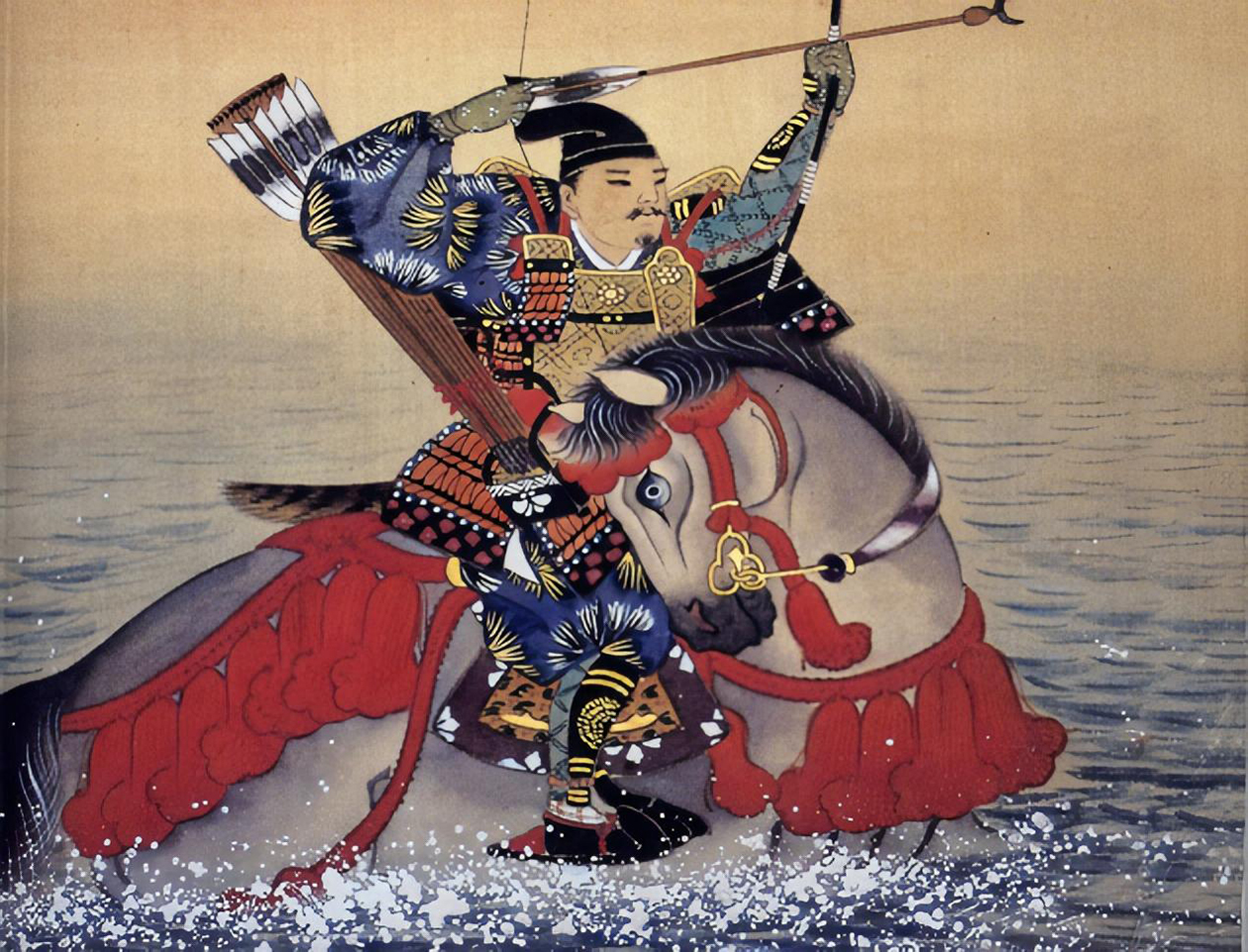
- Nasu no Yoichi, as depicted in a hanging scroll in the Watanabe Museum
- Born: May 9, 1169 (First year of the Kaō Era)
- Burial place: Sosein Temple, Kyoto City, Kyoto Prefecture, Genseiji Temple in Otawara City, Tochigi Prefecture, Hekunji Soshoin Temple in Suma Ward, Kobe City, Hyogo Prefecture
- Other name: Munetaka
- Spouse: Yoshishige Nitta’s daughter
- Father: Nasu no Suketaka
- Relatives: Mitsutaka Morita (Taro), Mikitaka imabuchi, Fukuhara Hisataka, Sukeyuki (Goro)）, Sanetaka Takita, Mitsutaka Sawamura、Yoshitaka Katata, Tomotaka Hieda, and Takashi Asakura.、Tametaka Senbon (Juro), Yoichi, and Yorisuke?, Sōjū

Nasu no Yoichi (那須 与一, Nasu no Yoichi) (c. 1169 – c. 1232) was a samurai who fought alongside the Minamoto clan in the Genpei War. He is particularly famous for his actions at the Battle of Yashima in 1185. According to the Heike Monogatari, the enemy Taira placed a fan atop a pole on one of their ships, daring the Minamoto warriors to shoot it off. Sitting atop his mount in the waves, his target atop the ship rocking as well, Nasu nevertheless shot it down with only one shot.

After the Genpei War, he was made shugo of Tottori Castle, but he lost this position to Kajiwara Kagetoki after being defeated in a hunting competition. He left Echigo Province and—following the death of Minamoto no Yoritomo—Nasu became a Buddhist monk in the Jōdo Shinshū sect. Eventually, he formed a temple, which has since been passed down to the oldest son of the Nasu family. For administrative purposes, detailed records were kept regarding who was to inherit the temple. As a result of this, it was possible to trace the Nasu lineage right up to the destruction of the temple during World War II.

There is another legend that his death in 1189 (or 1190) was disguised to facilitate his escape from Yoritomo's purge, and that the reason for his becoming a priest was that his complexion had changed due to Hansen's disease. Meanwhile, according to Yoshisada Nasu, Yoichi was pardoned and returned to Nasu after Yoritomo's death, became a priest in order to enter the Jodo-shu sect and died from paralysis in 1232 in Settsu Province, after a journey of about 30 years mourning those who had died in the Battle of Gempei-Kassen.

== Name ==
Yoichi is a common name which denotes the tenth or eleventh son. Sanada Yoshitada and Asari Yoshito were contemporaries who also called themselves Yoichi. They and Nasu no Yoichi are collectively called the 'three Yoichi of Genji.'

== Biography ==
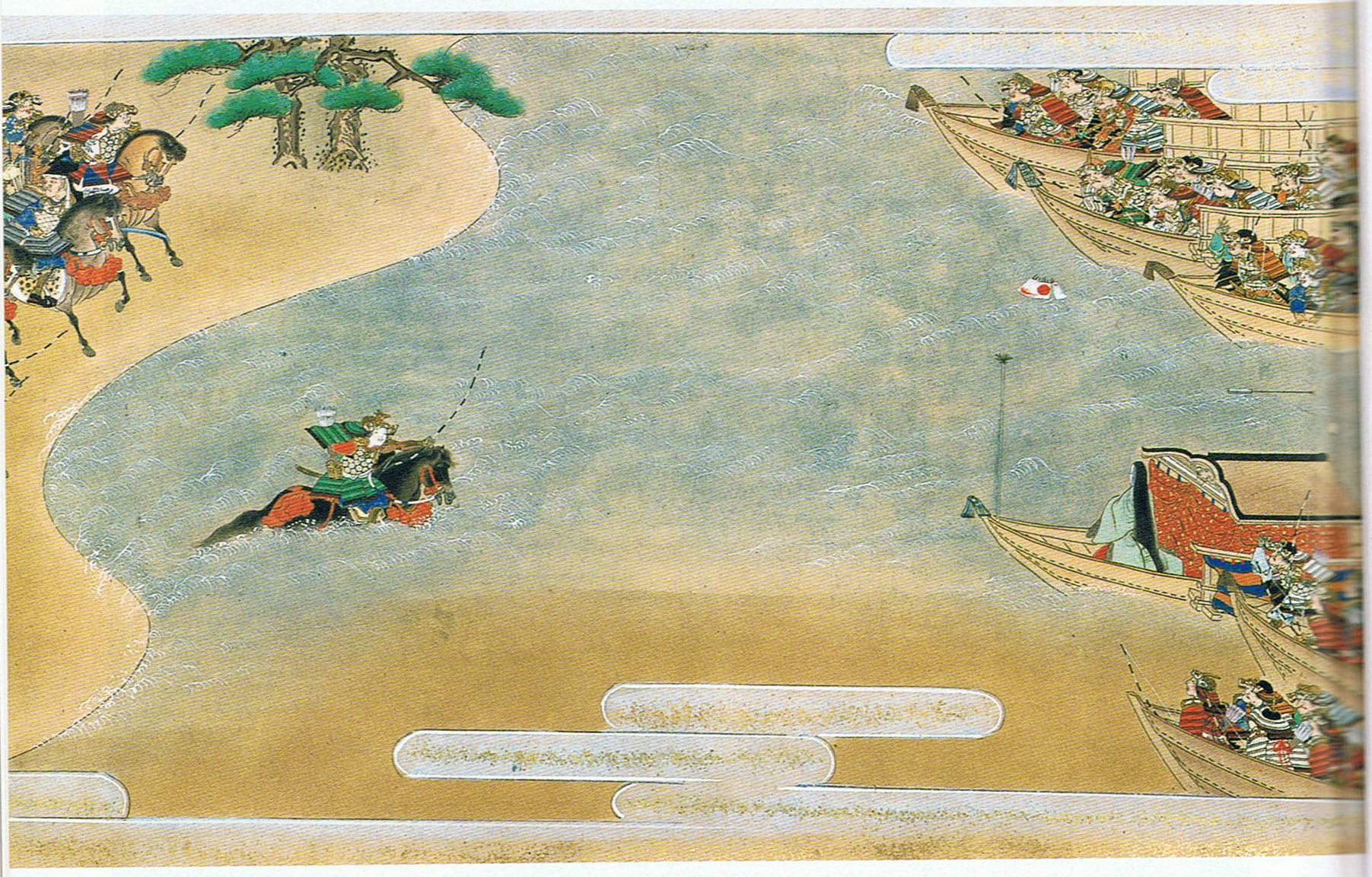
Nasu no Yoichi firing his famous shot at a fan atop the mast of a Taira ship. From a hanging scroll, Watanabe Museum, Tottori Prefecture, Japan.

Since the name of Nasu no Yoichi is not seen in historical materials of the same period such as Azuma Kagami (The Mirror of the East), Yoichi's achievements are mostly handed down in the war chronicles The Tale of the Heike and Genpei Seisuiki.

According to the description of the Tale of the Heike, he was born as a child of Nasu no Suketaka around the first year of Kao (1169), the first year of Eiman / the first year of Nin'an (1166), and the third year of Nin'an (1168). It is often assumed that the place of birth was Kanda-jo Castle (present Nakagawa-machi, Nasu County, Tochigi Prefecture) where the Nasu clan lived at that time.

In the Genpei War, he took the side of Minamoto no Yoritomo along with his brother Juro Tametaka, and joined the army of his younger brother, Yoshitsune. In the Battle of Yashima, he famously shot down the target of a fan on the Taira clan's warship, and was granted a shoen (manor in medieval Japan) over five provinces by Yoritomo.

His nine older brothers, except Tametaka, supported the Taira clan. Tametaka was later punished, and therefore, Yoichi gained the family estate of the Nasu clan, although he was the eleventh son. Yoichi pardoned his older brothers who had escaped to various places such as Shinano, gave them territory, and laid the foundation for the development of the Nasu clan in Shimotsuke Province.

== Hearsay and folklore ==
There is a local legend that states he was good at archery since he was a child, and showed his skill in front of his brothers and surprised his father Suketaka. There is also a legend that, when practicing archery at Mount Nasu in 1180, Suketaka met Yoshitsune who came to Nasu Onsen-jinja Shrine to pray for certain victory and exchanged an agreement with his older brother Juro Tametaka to let Yoichi join the Minamoto clan.

In addition, there are several temples and shrines which Yoichi founded. In the Heike Monogatari, the story of shooting a target of a fan is very famous.

There is also Bitchu Ebara no Sho, one of the manors which is said to have been obtained by the achievement of shooting a fan target. It is not known whether this legend is true or not, but it is recorded that at least in the middle of the Kamakura period, the Nasu clan (Ebara Nasu clan and Bitchu Nasu clan) ruled the area.

It is said that the length of the arm changed on the right and left sides because he had too much training to improve the arm of the bow.

== Grave ==
His grave is in Sokujo-in Temple in Kyoto City, Kyoto Prefecture, where his older brother Sukeno built a temple called Kosho-in Temple and buried a part of the bone, and although it was once abolished in 1514, Sukekage NASU rebuilt it as the family temple, Genjo-ji Temple (Otawara City, Tochigi Prefecture) of the Nasu clan in 1590 and the Nasu clan regarded it as his main grave.

Also, in Sosho-in Temple of Hekiun-ji Temple in Suma Ward, Kobe City, Hyogo Prefecture, there is a tomb of Yoichi called NASU no Yoichi Munetaka Gobo. There is a legend that if you visit this grave, you will not be able to take care of your age. In the vicinity are Kitamuki Hachiman-jinja Shrine, which is said to have been worshipped by Yoichi, and Nasu-jinja Shrine, which is enshrined by local people.

In front of Kokuzo Bosatsu-do Hall located to the northwest of Saren-ji Temple in 5-chome, Yonezawa City, Yamagata Prefecture, there is a three-storied stone pagoda approximately 4.2 meters in height with the name of Nasu no Yoichi inscribed. This is considered to be a memorial tower for Yoichi, and the tower has the inscription of 'Nasu no Yoichi Soryu no ko' and 'Chisaka Tsushima no kami Kagechika' and the inscription 'Construction of May 13, 1349' on the back. Kagechika Chisaka was a senior vassal of Uesugi Kenshin, but the Chisaka clan had a marital relationship with the Nasu clan, and it is said that the statue of kokuzo Bosatsu (the statue of kokuzo Bosatsu) of Yoichi was passed down.

Also, there is a five-ring memorial tower for Yoichi in the mountains of Bicchu Ebara-so, one of the manors he acquired across the country for the merit of shooting at a fan target.

The graves of the Nasu family are located in the Tokugawa family cemetery (Kan'eiji Temple), which is now under the management of Yosuin, but in 2014 the gravestones of the 20th to 26th generations were taken away for eternal use. The headstones of the 27th through 33rd generations are now in place. They are as follows:

Saemon Daisuke 1516 Moved to Kaminosho in the 13th year of the Heishi Era, August 4, 1999.

Masasuke Nasu Yoichi, 21st governor of Iki (1546), died on July 23, 1592

22nd Nasu Yoichi Takasuke, Repairer, Buddhist name: Tensei Osun, 1551, died on January 23, Tenbun 20, 1551

The 23rd Nasu Yoichi Suketane, Repairer, legal name: Egetsuin Ashigiri Genseki Daizen Sadamon, 1583, died on February 11, Tensho 11.

24th Nasu Yoichi Sukeharu, repairer, legal name: Fuwakuin-dono Kyuuzan Keikaku Daizenjyakumon, 1609, graduated on December 7, Keicho 14

25th Nasu Yoichi Sukekage, Sakyo-taio, legal name: Suminein-dono Tsukiyama Tochi-daishi, died on December 7, 1656, Keicho 14

26th Nasu Yoichi Sukeshige, Governor of Mino, Buddhist priest, Jikyoin-dono Shingensei-daiei, died in 1642, July 25, Kan'ei 19.

Seen in 2014

27th Nasu Yoichi Sukeshige (Air, Wind, Fire, Water, Earth, Central) Name: Rendaiin Kōkoku Seishin Daiin 1687, June 25, Jōkyō 4, Graduated

28th Nasu Yoichi Sukenori, left side, Dharma name: Seikoin-dono Gekimine Joshin-daiei, graduated June 25, 1708 29th generation Nasu Yoichi Shokutoku, right side, Buddhist priest, Jukko Tokun Dai-i-sensei, Hoikein-dono, graduated on June 8, 1718.

The 30th Nasu Yoichi Sukinao, tiger "Sukinao", Buddhist name: Shinzenin-dono Tokujun Ryoyoshi, grand master, 1783, graduated on July 4, 1783

Akira, the 31st Nasu Yoichikushi, Buddhist priest, born in 1832, graduated on January 5, 1828. The 32nd generation, Nasu Yoichi Shikire, Buddhist name: Choshoin-dono Ichimu Genku Dai-in 1861, graduated on September 5, 1861

The 33rd Nasu Yoichi Sukeyo, Dharma name: Daitatsuin-dono Enjodo-hon, graduated on July 8, 1870.

14 other women, 1 child

== Impact on future generations ==
The common name of the head of the Nasu clan has been "Nasu Taro" for generations with a few exceptions (Nasu Yoshitaka, Nasu Mitsuyoshi, etc.), but since the Edo period, successive heads of the Nasu clan, such as Nasu Sukekage, have used the common name "Nasu Yoichi.

== In popular culture ==
The character of Nasu no Yoichi is played by the elder brother of Non-chan in Ishii Momoko's Nonchan kumo ni noru (ノンちゃん雲に乗る).

Nasu no Yoichi is one of the main characters in the manga/anime Drifters, where he appears as a young man under the age of 19 and is voiced by Mitsuki Saiga.

The story of Nasu shooting the fan off of the rocking boat was briefly re-enacted in the Studio Ghibli film, Pom Poko, when old Yashima no Hage-tanuki shapeshifts into it.

In High School Inari Tamamo-chan manga, the story was twisted; Nasu no Yoichi was Tenko Fushimi, as her bow skills were legendary, but the fact that she was a fox guardian was concealed.

In the Final Fantasy franchise, a recurring weapon known as the Yoichi Bow is often shown as a powerful bow - if not the most powerful one - in the game it appears in.

In Doodle Champion Island Games, Captain Yoichi is the champion to beat in an archery contest involving fans.

In the 2005 Taiga Drama Yoshitsune, he was portrayed by the actor Tsubasa Imai.
