= Aibiki River =

Coordinates: 34.3422°N 134.1144°E

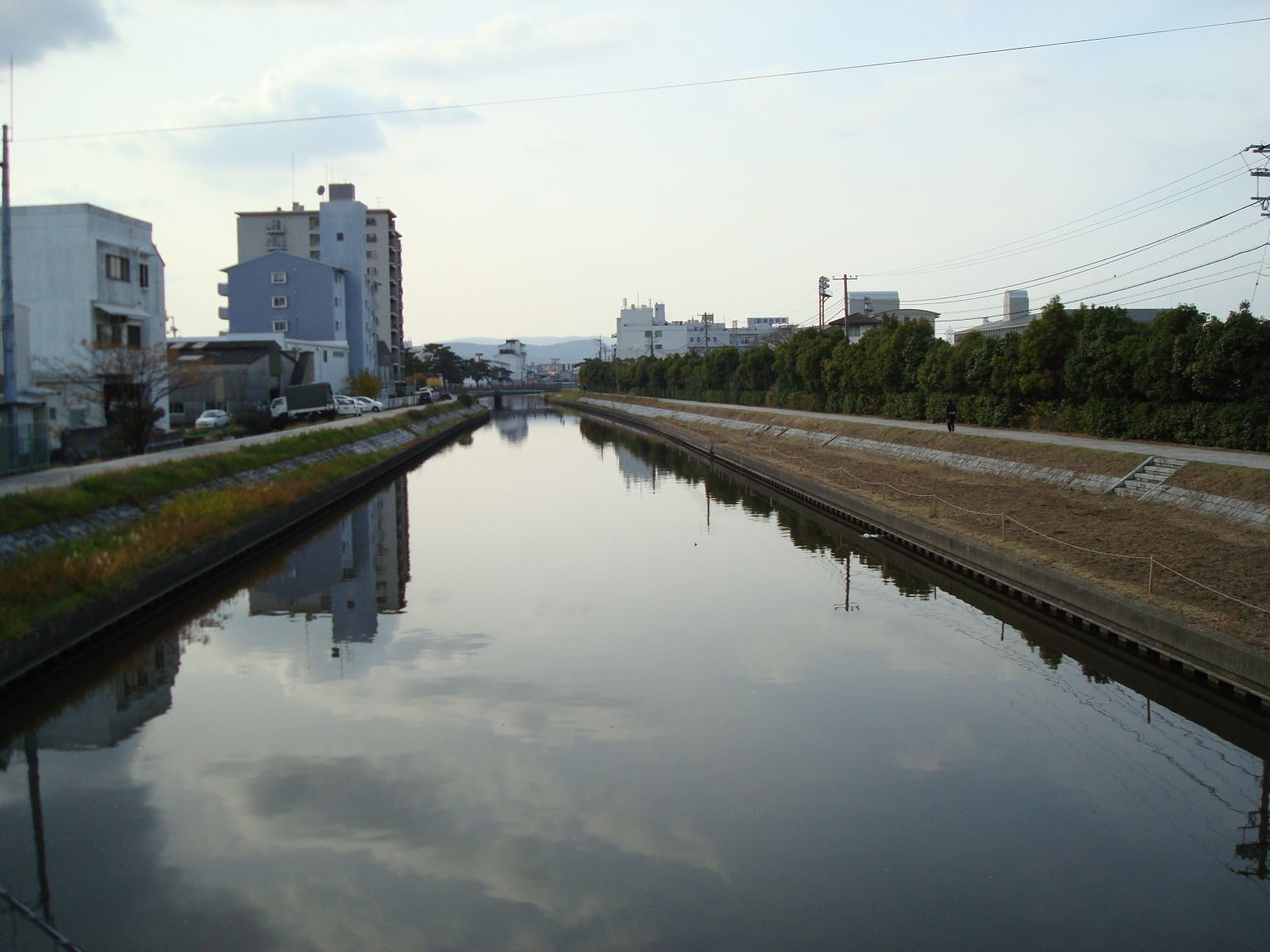
- The Aibiki River flowing through Takamatsu

- Native name: 相引川 (Japanese)

Location
- Country: Japan

Physical characteristics
- Source
  - location: Seto Inland Sea
  - elevation: 0 m (0 ft)
- Mouth
  - location: Seto Inland Sea
- Length: 5 km (3.1 mi)
- Basin size: 11.6 km^{2} (4.5 sq mi)

The Aibiki River (相引川, Aibiki-gawa) is a river located in Takamatsu, Kagawa, Japan.

== Name ==
The river is named "Aibiki" (roughly translating as "mutual pulling") because both its source and its mouth are in the Seto Inland Sea. During low tide, the river flows towards both the mouth and the origin, making it seem like it is being pulled both ways.

It is also said that the name came about during the Battle of Yashima, which was fought between the Minamoto and Taira clans.
