= Heikeopsis arachnoides =

Scientific classification
- Domain: Eukaryota
- Kingdom: Animalia
- Phylum: Arthropoda
- Class: Malacostraca
- Order: Decapoda
- Suborder: Pleocyemata
- Infraorder: Brachyura
- Family: Dorippidae
- Genus: Heikeopsis
- Species: H. arachnoides

Binomial name
- Heikeopsis arachnoides (Manning et Holthuis, 1986)

Species of crab

Heikeopsis arachnoides is a species of the genus Heikeopsis first described by Manning and Holthuis in 1986. These crabs are native to Japan. They typically live in the sand 15-130m below the surface of water. Heikeopsis arachnoides also lives in Taiwan.
