= Taira no Tadamori =

Japanese clan leader (1096–1153)

- 平 忠盛
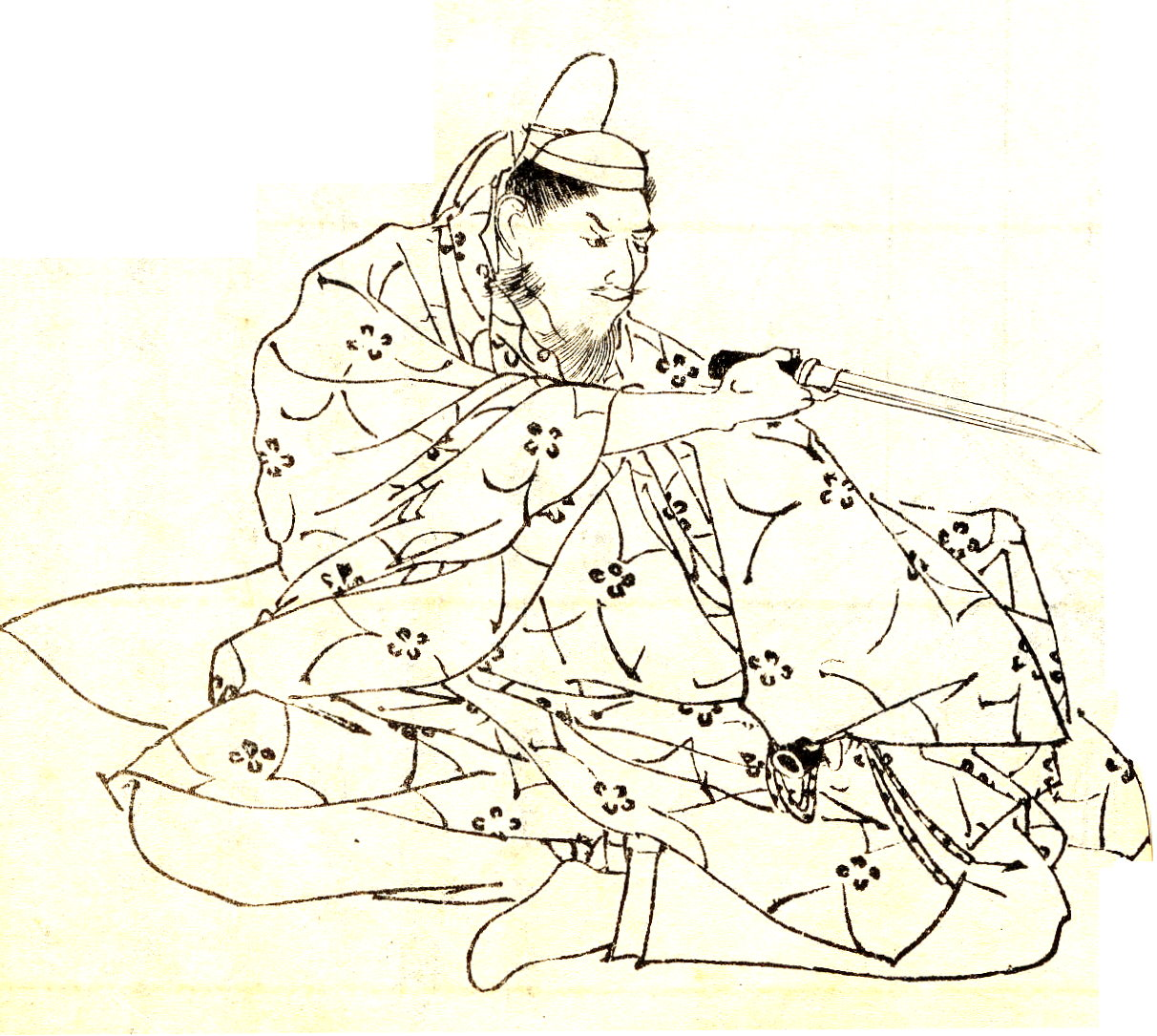
- Taira no Tadamori by Kikuchi Yōsai

Personal details
- Born: 1096
- Died: 1153 (aged 56–57)
- Spouse: Gion no Nyogo
- Children: Taira no Kiyomori; Taira no Tsunemori; Taira no Norimori; Taira no Tadanori
- Parent: Taira no Masamori (father)

Taira no Tadamori (平 忠盛; 1096 – 1153) was the head of the Taira clan. He was son of Taira no Masamori, and father of Taira no Kiyomori. Tadamori was also governor of the provinces of Harima, Ise, Bizen, and Tajima.

He consolidated the influence of the Taira clan at the Imperial Court, and is said to have been the first samurai to serve the Emperor directly, at Court.

As a servant of the Court, Tadamori waged campaigns, beginning in 1129, against pirates on the coasts of San'yōdō and Nankaidō. He also served his own clan in battling the warrior monks of Nara and of Mount Hiei.

Tadamori is also credited with the construction of the Rengeō-in, a major and now-famous temple in Kyoto, which includes the longest wooden building in the world, the Sanjūsangen-dō. Tadamori was granted the governorship of Tajima province as a reward for completing this project.

== Family ==
- Father: Taira no Masamori
- Wife: Gion no Nyogo (?-1147)
- Sons:
  - Taira no Kiyomori
  - Taira no Tsunemori
  - Taira no Norimori
  - Taira no Tadanori
