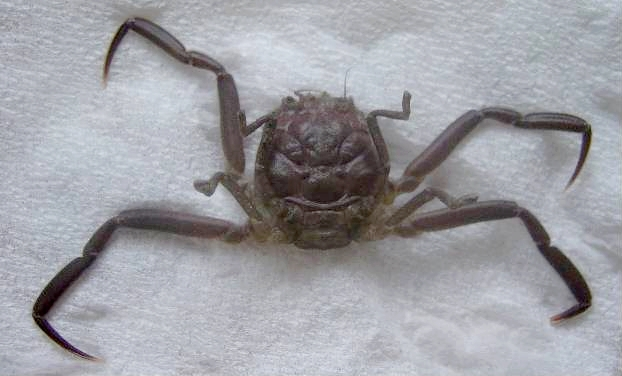

Scientific classification
- Kingdom: Animalia
- Phylum: Arthropoda
- Clade: Pancrustacea
- Class: Malacostraca
- Order: Decapoda
- Suborder: Pleocyemata
- Infraorder: Brachyura
- Family: Dorippidae
- Genus: Heikeopsis
- Species: H. japonica

Binomial name
- Heikeopsis japonica (von Siebold, 1824)

= Heikegani =

Species of crab

Heikegani (平家蟹, ヘイケガニ; Literal meaning: Heike Crab, Heikeopsis japonica) is a species of crab native to Japan, with a shell that bears a pattern resembling a human face – an example of the phenomenon of pareidolia – which is interpreted to be the face of an angry samurai, hence the nickname samurai crab. The crabs are named after the once powerful Taira clan which dominated medieval Japan, commonly known as the Heike. It is believed that these crabs are reincarnations of the Heike warriors defeated at the naval Battle of Dan-no-ura as told in The Tale of the Heike. While the crabs are edible, they are not eaten by most Japanese.

== Origin of the carapace pattern ==
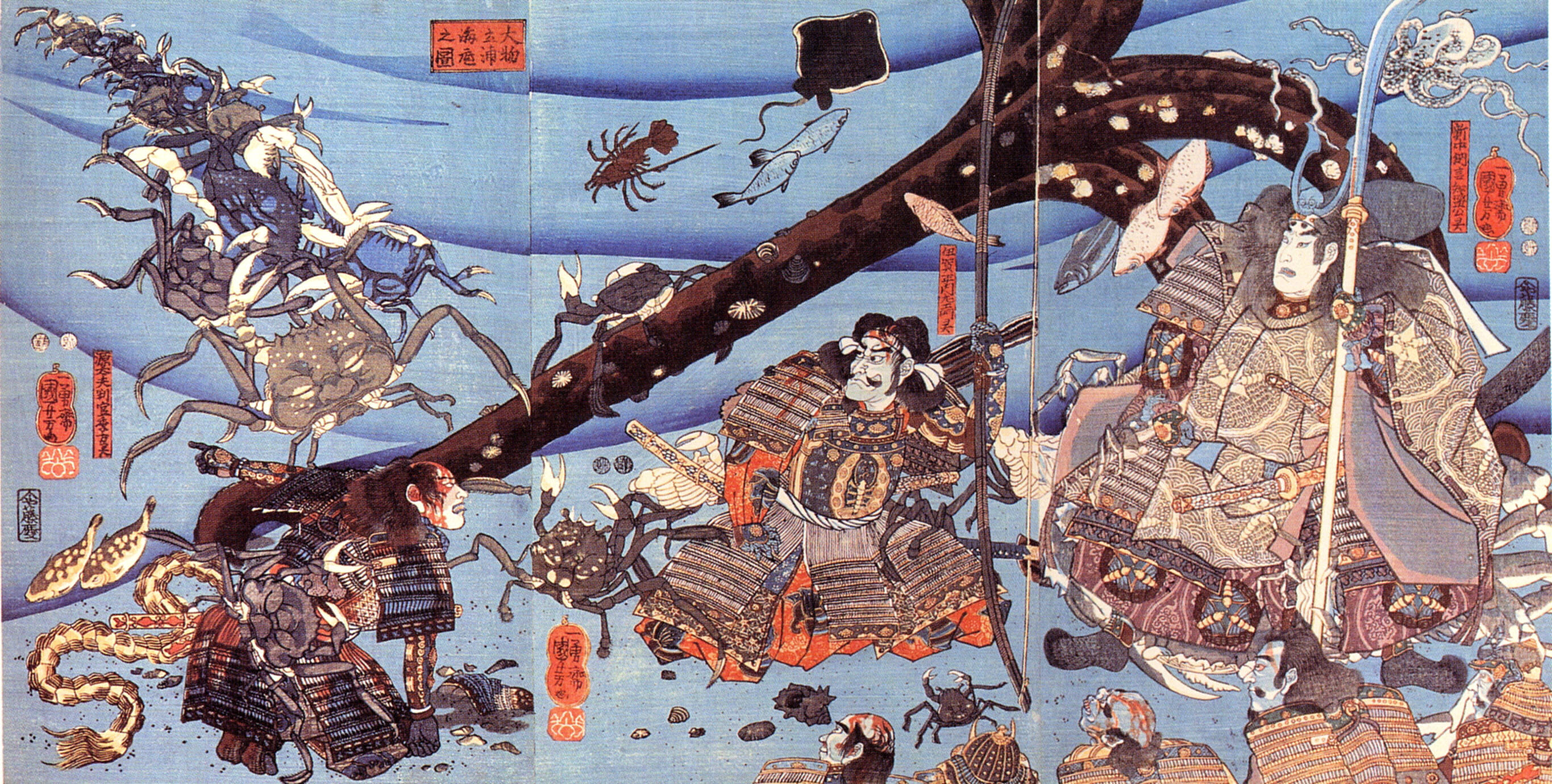
Heikegani with human-like faces depicted in an ukiyo-e print by Utagawa Kuniyoshi.

Heikegani were used by Carl Sagan in his popular science television series Cosmos: A Personal Voyage as an example of unintentional artificial selection, an interpretation originally published by Julian Huxley in 1952. According to this hypothesis, the crabs with shells resembling samurai were thrown back to the sea by fishermen out of respect for the Heike warriors, while those not resembling samurai were eaten, giving the former a greater chance of reproducing. Therefore, the more closely the crabs resembled a samurai face, the more likely they would be spared and thrown back.

This idea has met with some skepticism. Joel Martin, for instance, notes that humans do not eat Heikegani, and as such there is no artificial pressure favoring face-like shell patterns, contrary to Sagan's implication. The pattern of ridges on the carapace serves a very functional purpose as sites of muscle attachment. Similar patterns are found on the carapaces of other species and genera throughout the world, including numerous fossil taxa.

== Battle of Dan-no-ura ==
The Battle of Dan-no-ura was preceded by an immense struggle between the imperial rulers of Japan, the Taira clan (also known as the Heike), who the Heikegani crabs are named after, and the Minamoto clan (Genji), who were fighting for control of the throne at the end of the 12th century in the Genpei War (1180–1185).

On the 24th of April 1185 AD, two powerful Samurai clans fought to the death on the Dan-no-ura bay of Japan's Inland Sea. The ruling Taira clan (Heike) was led by their child-Emperor, Antoku, and his grandmother, Taira no Tokiko. The Heike had ruled Japan for many decades, but now, massively outnumbered, they faced defeat at the hands of the Minamoto.

During the battle, Tokiko took the seven-year-old Emperor Antoku and leaped with him into the water in the Shimonoseki Straits, drowning the child emperor, rather than allowing him to be captured by the opposing forces, and most members and generals of the Taira clan followed them in despair. Antoku came to be worshipped as Mizu-no-kami ("god of water").

This crucial battle was a cultural and political turning point in Japanese history: Minamoto Yoritomo became the first Shōgun, or military ruler, of Japan. Dan-no-ura marked the beginning of seven centuries during which Japan was ruled by warriors and shōguns instead of emperors.

== Cultural references ==
In Kwaidan: Stories and Studies of Strange Things, the writer, Lafcadio Hearn, references the Heike crab in "The Story of Mimi-Nashi-Hoichi".

In the 1964 Japanese anthology film Kwaidan, based on Hearn's stories, "Hoichi the Earless" recounts the story of the Battle of Dan-no-ura, which becomes the basis of "Hoichi the Earless". The narrator explains the myth, illustrated with prominent footage of the crabs. At the end of the "Hoichi the Earless" segment, Hoichi is seen playing the lute, with heikegani on his shoulders.

In his 1980 science series Cosmos: A Personal Voyage, Carl Sagan used heikegani to illustrate artificial selection. British biologist Richard Dawkins discussed the same idea in his 2009 book The Greatest Show on Earth: The Evidence for Evolution.

Heike crabs appear as an important part of the plot in one of the comic book stories of Usagi Yojimbo, a rabbit samurai character created by Stan Sakai. The "Grass Cutter" story published in volume 2 of the Usagi Saga tells the legend of how a sacred sword kusanagi was lost and then found with help from samurai crabs.
