= Satō Tadanobu =

- 佐藤 忠信
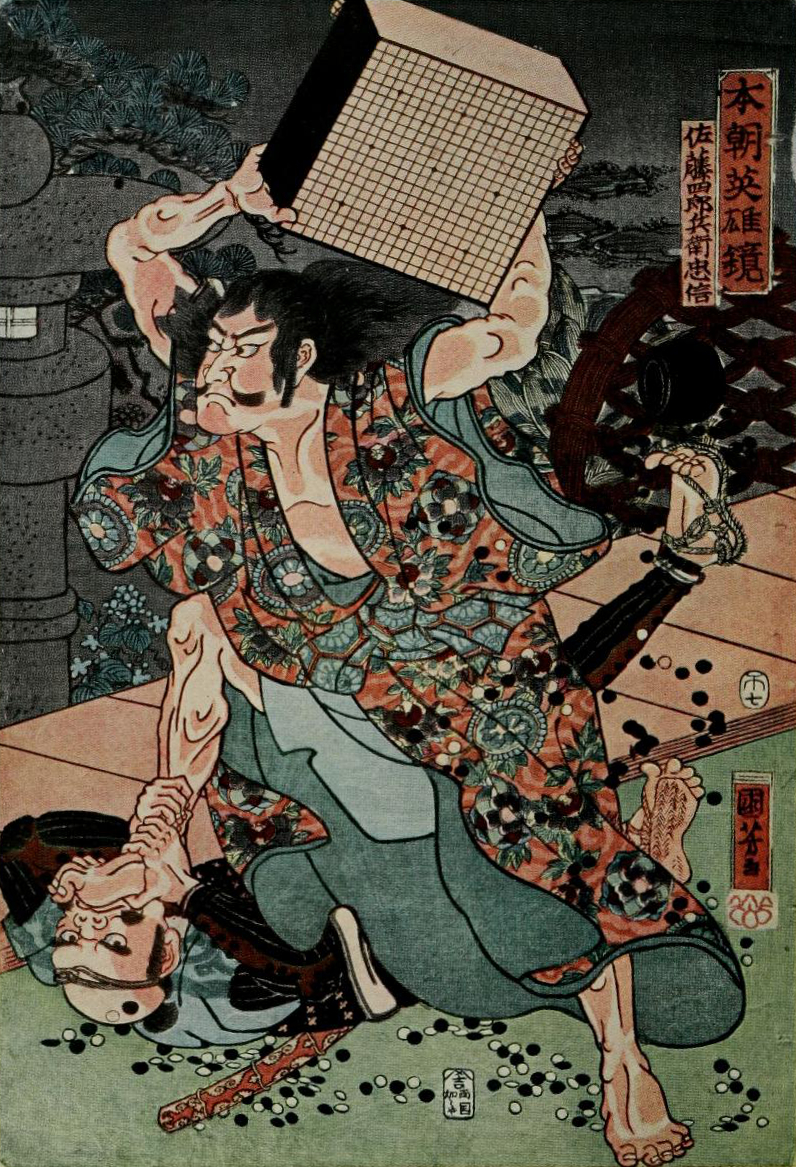
- Sato Tadanobu, a Samurai of the Twelfth Century, Defending Himself with a Goban when Attacked by His Enemies. Ukiyo print by Utagawa Kuniyoshi
- Born: 1161
- Died: November 1186 (aged 24–25)
- Other names: Shirō, 四郎兵衛尉

Satō Tadanobu (佐藤 忠信) was a Japanese samurai of the late-Heian period. He was a follower of Minamoto no Yoshitsune. According to the Genpei Jōsuiki, he was one of the Yoshitsune Shitennō (義経 四天王; literally "Yoshitsune's Four Heavenly Kings"), along with Kamata Morimasa, Kamata Mitsumasa, and Satō Tsugunobu. He was the younger brother of Tsugunobu, and their father was the Ōshū Fujiwara retainer Satō Motoharu.

Tsugunobu and his brother Tadanobu "were 'given' to Yoshitsune by Fujiwara no Hidehira when Yoshitsune left Oshu to join Yoritomo."

== Yoshitsune's retreat ==
Satō is most well known for saving his master Yoshitsune's life at Yoshino, a story recorded in the Gikeiki. The story has become somewhat legendary over the years. Whilst travelling to Kyushu to escape from the troops of his brother Yoritomo, Yoshitsune and his forces were beset by the monks of Zo-o-no, and were facing defeat. Satō volunteered to fight a rearguard action to allow Yoshitsune time to reach safety, and asked for the loan of his master's armour in order to convince the pursuing troops that Yoshitsune was still within their grasp. (This was not an entirely selfless act, since Yoshitsune's armour would have been of better quality than Satō's, and would have afforded better protection.) Disguised as Yoshitsune, Satō challenged and fought the group's pursuers, killing or wounding around twenty men. His companions were killed, but Satō evaded capture and proceeded to Kyoto. In Kyoto he stayed at the house of a woman acquaintance, but was discovered and attacked. Under threat of capture, he committed seppuku. His widow, Kaede, along with her sister-in-law Wakazakura, attempted to comfort his grieving mother by presenting herself wearing her late husband's armour.

== "Goban" Tadanobu ==
A popular story regarding Satō Tadanobu's death involves him being attacked whilst playing a game of go. Unable to reach his weapons, he is said to have picked up the goban and used it to fight off his enemies before eventually killing himself. This episode has been a popular theme in ukiyo prints, and has also inspired kabuki plays such as Yoshino Shizuka Goban Tadanobu and Yoshitsune Senbon Zakura, and the ko-jururi play Goban Tadanobu. In many of these plays, the Tadanobu character is implied to be a fox spirit ("Genkurō"), due to his impersonation of Yoshitsune (in Japan, foxes were believed to be shape-shifters).
