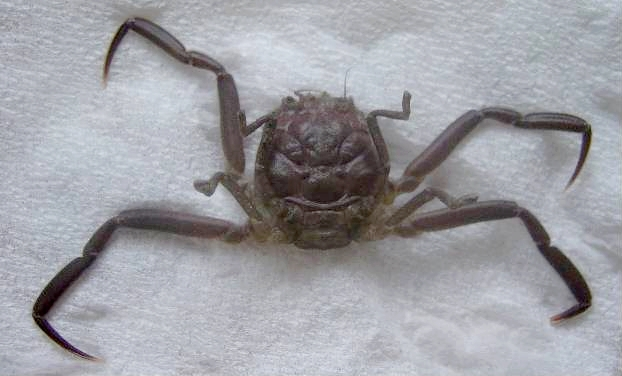
- Heikeopsis japonica

Scientific classification
- Kingdom: Animalia
- Phylum: Arthropoda
- Class: Malacostraca
- Order: Decapoda
- Suborder: Pleocyemata
- Infraorder: Brachyura
- Family: Dorippidae
- Genus: Heikeopsis; Ng, Guinot & Davie, 2008

Species
- Heikeopsis arachnoides (Manning & Holthuis, 1986); Heikeopsis japonica (von Siebold, 1824)

Synonyms
- Heikea Holthuis & Manning, 1990

= Heikeopsis =

Genus of crabs

Heikeopsis is a genus of crabs containing two species, Heikeopsis japonica and Heikeopsis arachnoides. The genus was originally described under the name "Heikea" by Lipke Holthuis and Raymond B. Manning in 1990, but was later determined to be a junior homonym of the gastropod genus Heikea, erected by Orvar Isberg in 1934.
