= Tenjinyama Castle (Inaba) =

Castle in Okayama, Japan

- 天神山城
- Tottori (city), Tottori Prefecture, Japan
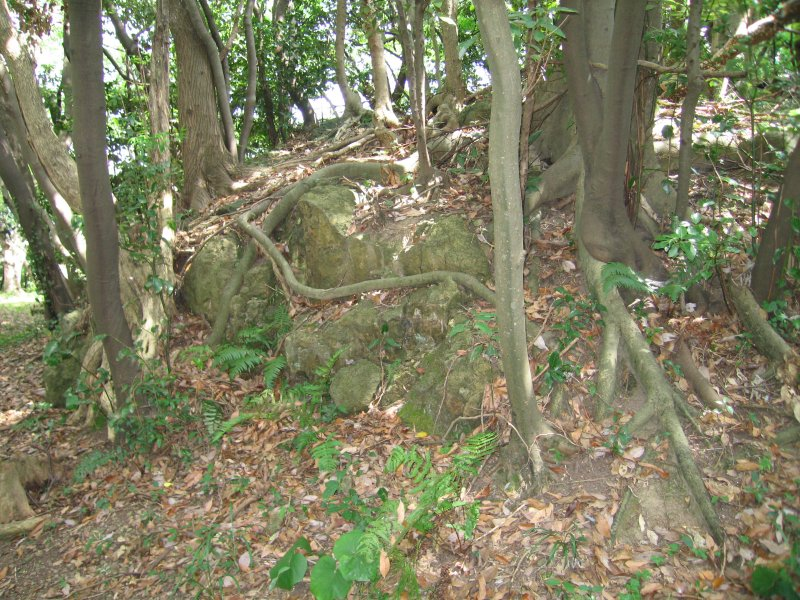
- Tenjinyama Castle (the foundation of the Castle tower)

Site information
- Type: Okajiro-style castle
- Owner: Inaba Yamana clan
- Condition: ruins

Site history
- Built: 1446
- Built by: Inaba Yamana clan
- Demolished: 1573
- Battles/wars: Siege of Tenjinyama castle

Garrison information
- Past commanders: Yamana Nobumichi, Yamana Toyokazu

Tenjinyama Castle (天神山城, Tenjinyama-jō) also known as Fuse-Tenjinyama Castle is the remains of a castle structure in Tottori (city), Tottori Prefecture, Japan. Its ruins have been protected as a Prefectural Historic Sites. The castle was the Shogosho (Shugo daimyo's residence or main bastion) of the Inaba Yamana clan.

The castle was built by Yamana Katutoyo in 1446. In 1573, Yamana Toyokuni moved Inaba Yamana clan's main bastion to Tottori castle. At the same time, The keep of the castle was moved to Tottori castle.
