= Siege of Tottori =

1581 siege

- Part of the Sengoku period
Date	May 1581
Location	Tottori Castle, Inaba Province, Japan (present-day Tottori, Tottori Prefecture) 35°30′27″N 134°14′24″E
Result	Hideyoshi victory
Territorial changes	Tottori Castle falls to Oda clan

Belligerents
Forces of Oda Nobunaga	Forces of Mōri clan

Commanders and leaders
Hashiba Hideyoshi; Hachisuka Koroku; Kuroda Kanbei; Kato Kiyomasa; Ishida Mitsunari	Yamana Toyokuni (surrendered); Kikkawa Tsuneie †
- Location within Tottori Prefecture Siege of Tottori (Japan)

The siege of Tottori Castle occurred in 1581 and was part of Oda Nobunaga's campaign to consolidate his power in western Honshu in an effort to unite Japan during the late 16th century. The siege was fought between Hashiba Hideyoshi, an Oda clan general, against a garrison under an ally of the Mōri clan.

It is a case in which starvation tactics were successfully used in a Sengoku Period siege. The siege lasted up to 200 days, when Kikkawa Tsuneie committed suicide to save his men from cannibalism.

== Background ==
Tottori Castle (鳥取城, Tottori-jō) was key to the Mōri clan's defense of their inner provinces against the encroachment of Oda Nobunaga.

In late 1580, as part of his campaign to extend Nobunaga's domain to the west, Hashiba Hideyoshi moved north from his new base in Harima and by 1581 entered Inaba province on the Sea of Japan wherein his forces encountered Tottori castle. The yamashiro (mountain) castle, built into the mountain itself, was owned by the Yamana clan under Yamana Toyokuni, but had passed to the Mori and was guarded by their retainer, Kikkawa Tsuneie. Hideyoshi made efforts to negotiate with Tsuneie, but the Mori retainer was resolved to hold onto the castle and keep it from falling into Oda hands.

== Siege ==
The siege began when Hideyoshi opted to cut off the castle's supplies and starve the garrison out. To this end, Hideyoshi drove the local villagers within the walls of the castle and all the approaches to Tottori were covered by erecting towers every 500 meters around the perimeter. Hideyoshi even went as far as purchasing all the available rice in Inaba province at several times the market price to aid in the process of breaking the resolve of the garrison.

Though the defenders held out for some time, their food stores began to run low and they were reduced to consuming all of the horses they had on hand. When these were gone, the defenders resorted to eating grass and rumored to be on the verge of cannibalism. Any emaciated defenders who attempted to flee the castle were picked off by arquebusiers.

After enduring 200 days, the siege ended when the lord of the castle, Kikkawa Tsuneie, surrendered and agreed to commit suicide. In spite of the garrison surviving the siege, many perished from refeeding syndrome when they gorged on the food provided to them when released into Hideyoshi's care.

== Aftermath ==
Hashiba Hideyoshi would return to his base at Himeji in Harima and continue westward along the San'yōdō through Bizen and into Mori-controlled Bitchu province, where in 1582 he would besiege the castle of Takamatsu.
