= Satō Tsugunobu =

12th century Japanese warrior

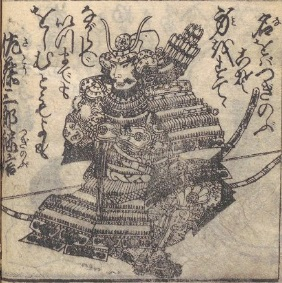

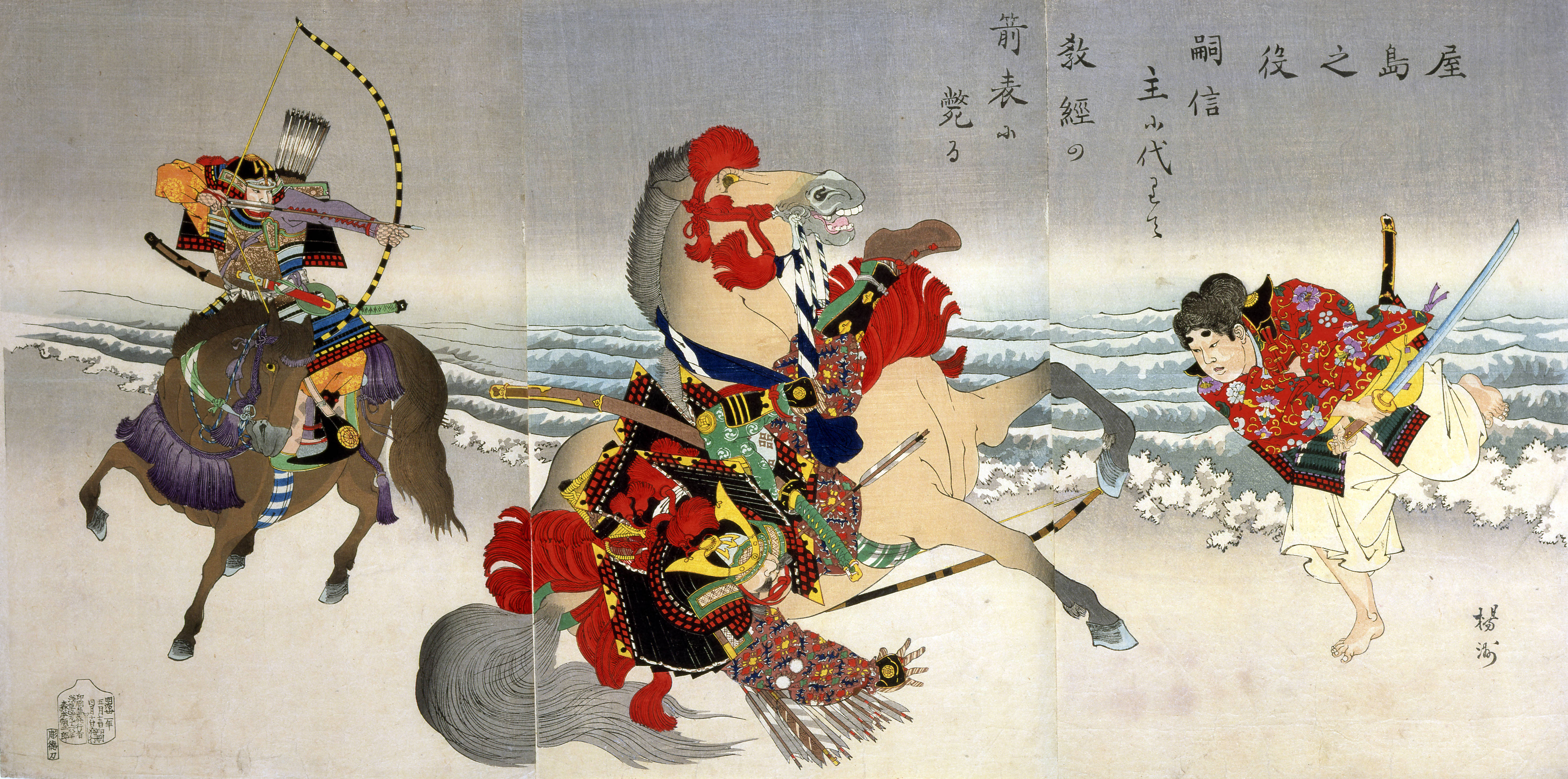
The death of Tsugunobu. An ukiyo-e by Yōshū Chikanobu.

Satō Tsugunobu (佐藤 継信; 1158–1185) was a Japanese warrior and the brother of Satō Tadanobu. Tsugunobu died in the Battle of Yashima, while protecting Minamoto Yoshitsune from an arrow shot by Taira no Noritsune by riding between Yoshitsune and Noritsune. Tsugunobu was buried in Mure, Kagawa, by Taira no Noritsune.

Tsugunobu and his brother Tadanobu "were 'given' to Yoshitsune by Fujiwara no Hidehira when Yoshitsune left Oshu to join Yoritomo".

Tsugunobu is mentioned in Hagakure, the famous book on bushido, in the passage about martial valor.
