= Taira no Norimori =

Japanese war commander

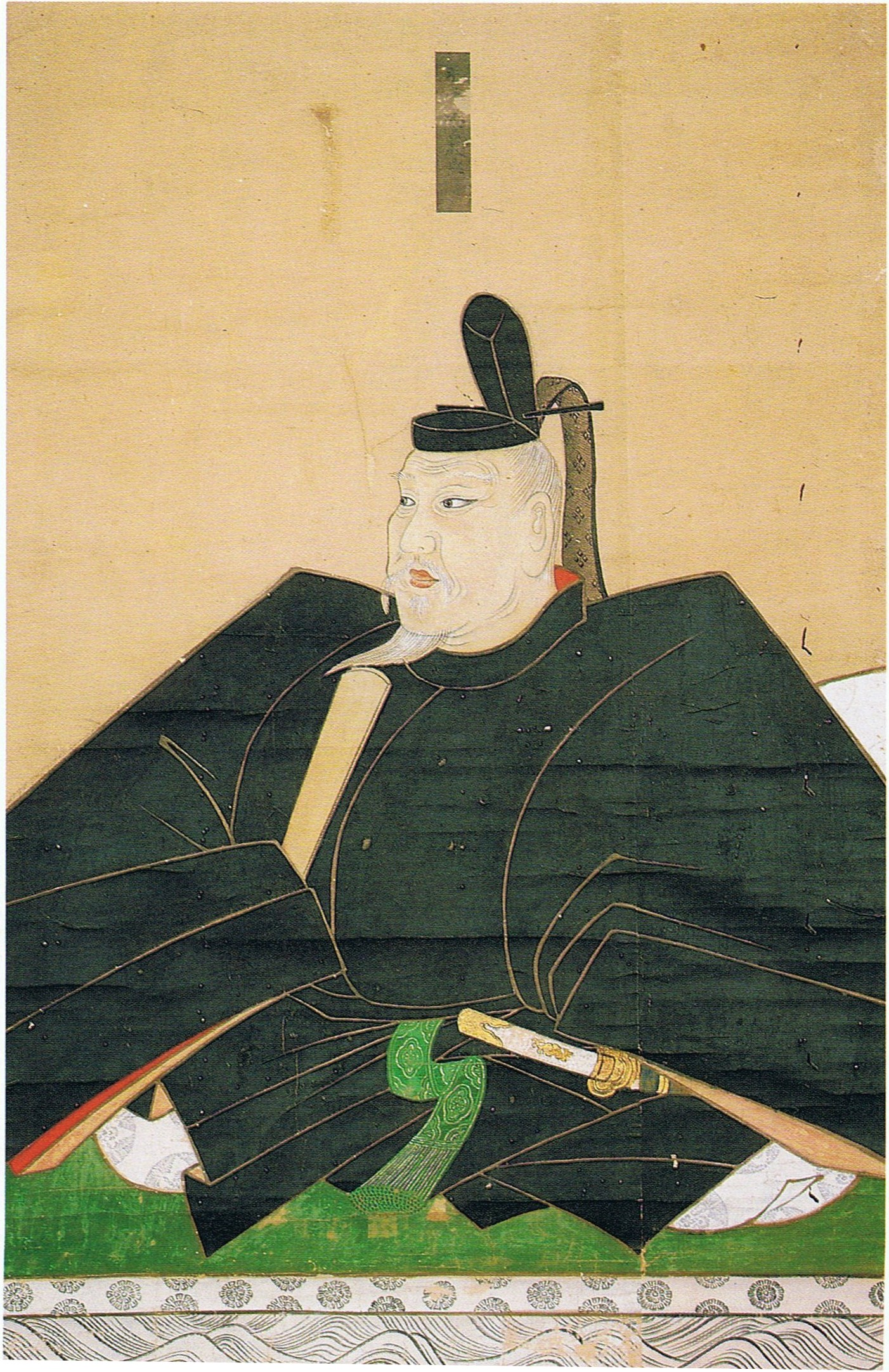
Taira no Norimori

Taira no Norimori (Japanese: 平教盛 たいら の のりもり; 1129–1185) was a commander during the Genpei War and was the 3rd son of Taira no Tadamori. During the Hogen Rebellion, he and his brother supported Emperor Go-Shirakawa. At the Battle of Dan-no-ura, he committed suicide by jumping overboard. His older brother, Taira no Tsunemori, and his son, Taira no Noritsune, also committed suicide in the Battle of Dan-no-Ura.
