= Battle of Dan-no-ura =

1185 naval battle of the Genpei War

- Part of the Genpei War
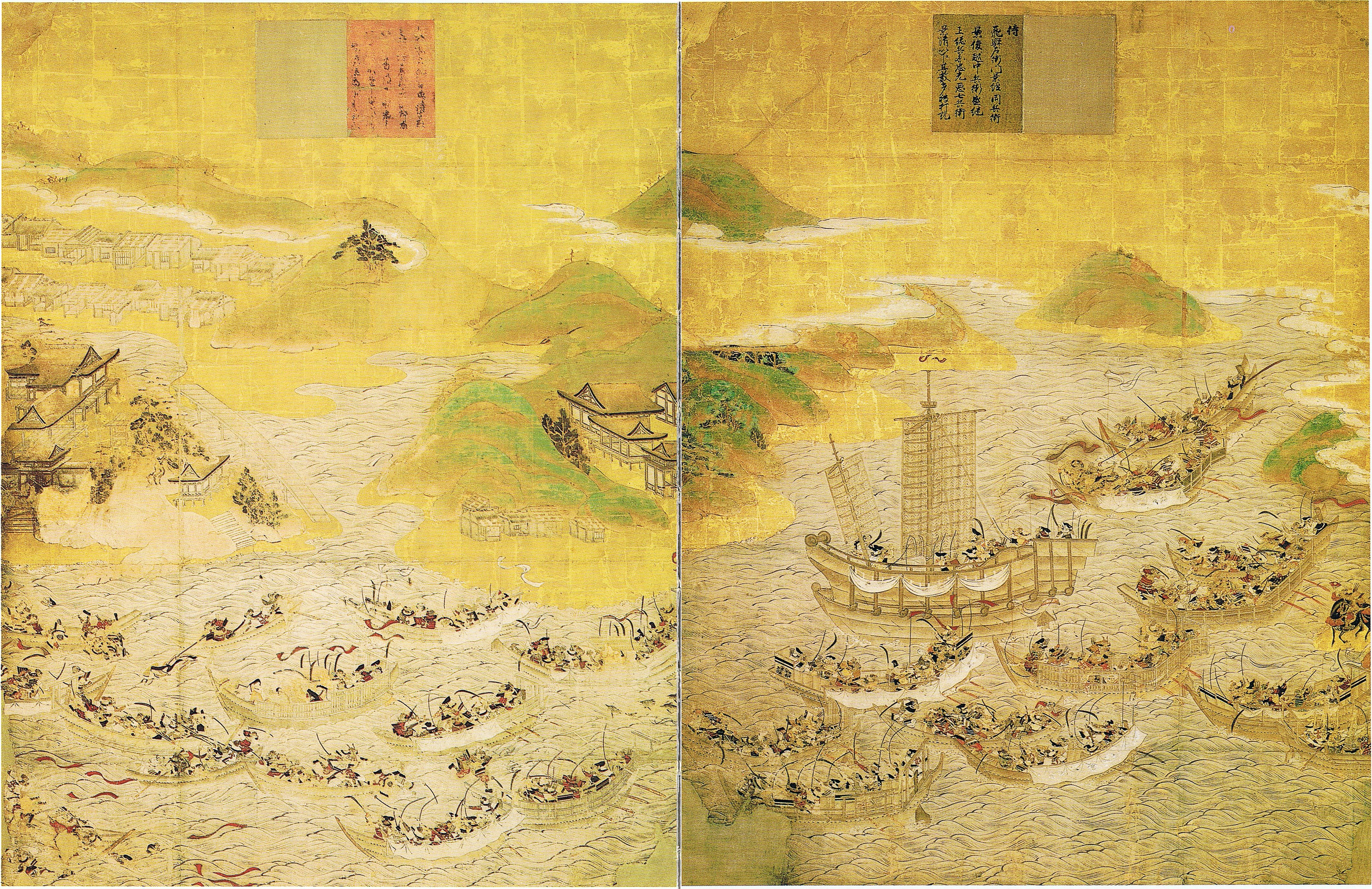
Date	April 25, 1185
Location	Shimonoseki, Kanmon Straits 33°57′54″N 130°57′24″E
Result	Minamoto clan victory
Territorial changes	Minamoto clan gain command of Japan

Belligerents
Minamoto clan	Taira clan

Commanders and leaders
Minamoto no Noriyori (land); Minamoto no Yoshitsune (naval); Kajiwara Kagetoki (espionage); Tanzo; Kono Tsushin (naval); Taguchi Shigeyoshi (defected)	Emperor Antoku †; Taira no Tokiko †; Taira no Munemori (executed); Taira no Tomomori †; Taira no Noritsune †; Taira no Norimori †; Taira no Tsunemori †; Taira Sukemori †; Taira Arimori †; Taira Yukimori †; Taira Tokitada (exiled); Taira Kiyomune; Taira no Kagekiyo (POW)

Strength
800 ships (Azuma Kagami) or 3,000 (The Tale of the Heike)	500 ships (Azuma Kagami) or 1,000 (The Tale of the Heike)

Casualties and losses
Unknown	Annihilated
- Location within Japan

The Battle of Dan-no-ura (壇ノ浦の戦い, Dan-no-ura no tatakai) was a major sea battle of the Genpei War, occurring at Dan-no-ura, in the Kanmon Straits off the southern tip of Honshū. On April 25, 1185 (or March 24, 1185 by the official page of Shimonoseki), the fleet of the Minamoto ('Genji') clan, led by general Minamoto no Yoshitsune, defeated the fleet of the Taira clan (Heike). The morning rip tide was an advantage for the Taira, but turned to their disadvantage in the afternoon. The young Emperor Antoku was one of those who died among the Taira nobles.

== History ==
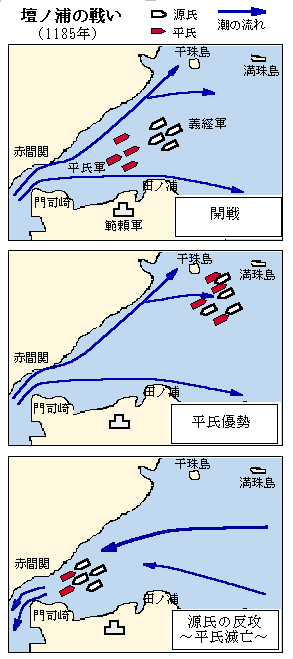
Map of the battle of Dan-no-ura, with red representing the Taira, white representing the Minamoto, and the blue arrows showing the direction of tidal current

At the time of the battle, the war was not going well for the Taira. They still had the Emperor on their side as well as the Imperial Regalia which symbolized the Emperor's authority, but had lost much of their territory since former campaigns. Still, the coming battle would be fought in their home territory with the trained southerners fighting in their home waters. The Taira were weaker (despite having more ships), but they had the advantage over the Minamoto in understanding the tides of that particular area as well as naval combat tactics in general. Another issue for the Taira was that the son of one of their generals, Taguchi Shigeyoshi, had been captured by the Minamoto and was being held hostage. While some of the other Taira generals encouraged their commander to either dismiss or execute Shigeyoshi as a liability, the commander believed in his continued loyalty to the cause after conversing with him. The Taira also brought the young emperor (who was around six years old at the time) and some of his retainers, dressed in their full court garb. Directly having the emperor with the army would inspire the troops and show the legitimacy of their cause, in theory.

The Taira split their fleet into three squadrons, while the Minamoto arrived en masse, their ships abreast, and archers ready. The beginning of the battle consisted mainly of a long-range archery exchange, before the Taira took the initiative, using the tides to help them try to surround the enemy ships. They engaged the Minamoto, and the archery from a distance eventually gave way to hand-to-hand combat with swords and daggers after the crews of the ships boarded each other. However, the tide changed, and the advantage was given back to the Minamoto.

One of the crucial factors that allowed the Minamoto to win the battle was that Taguchi Shigeyoshi did indeed defect. His squadron attacked the Taira from the rear. He also revealed to the Minamoto which ship Emperor Antoku was on. Their archers turned their attention to the helmsmen and rowers of the Emperor's ship, as well as the rest of their enemy's fleet, sending their ships out of control. Many of the Taira saw the battle turn against them and committed suicide. Among those who perished this way were Antoku and his maternal grandmother, Nun of the Second Rank, Taira no Tokiko the widow of Taira no Kiyomori. The Taira attempted to toss the imperial regalia into the sea to deny them to the Minamoto but only managed to get the Kusanagi sword and Yasakani jewel into the water before the ship holding the regalia was captured. Apocryphally, the woman who attempted to toss the mirror looked into it and died instantly from its spiritual power. The jewel was recovered by divers; many presume the sword to have been lost at this time. A new sword was found eventually. A variety of explanations exist for the sword used afterward: that it was a replica, that it was recovered from the sea anyway, that it was supernaturally delivered or remade, and others; the new sword was enshrined at Atsuta Shrine.

== Aftermath ==
This decisive defeat of the Taira forces led to the end of the Taira bid for control of Japan. Minamoto no Yoritomo, the elder half-brother of Minamoto Yoshitsune, became the first shōgun, establishing his military government (bakufu) in Kamakura. In this battle the Taira lost Taira Tomomori, Taira Noritsune, Taira Norimori, Taira Tsunemori, Taira Sukemori, Taira Arimori and Taira Yukimori, who were all killed.

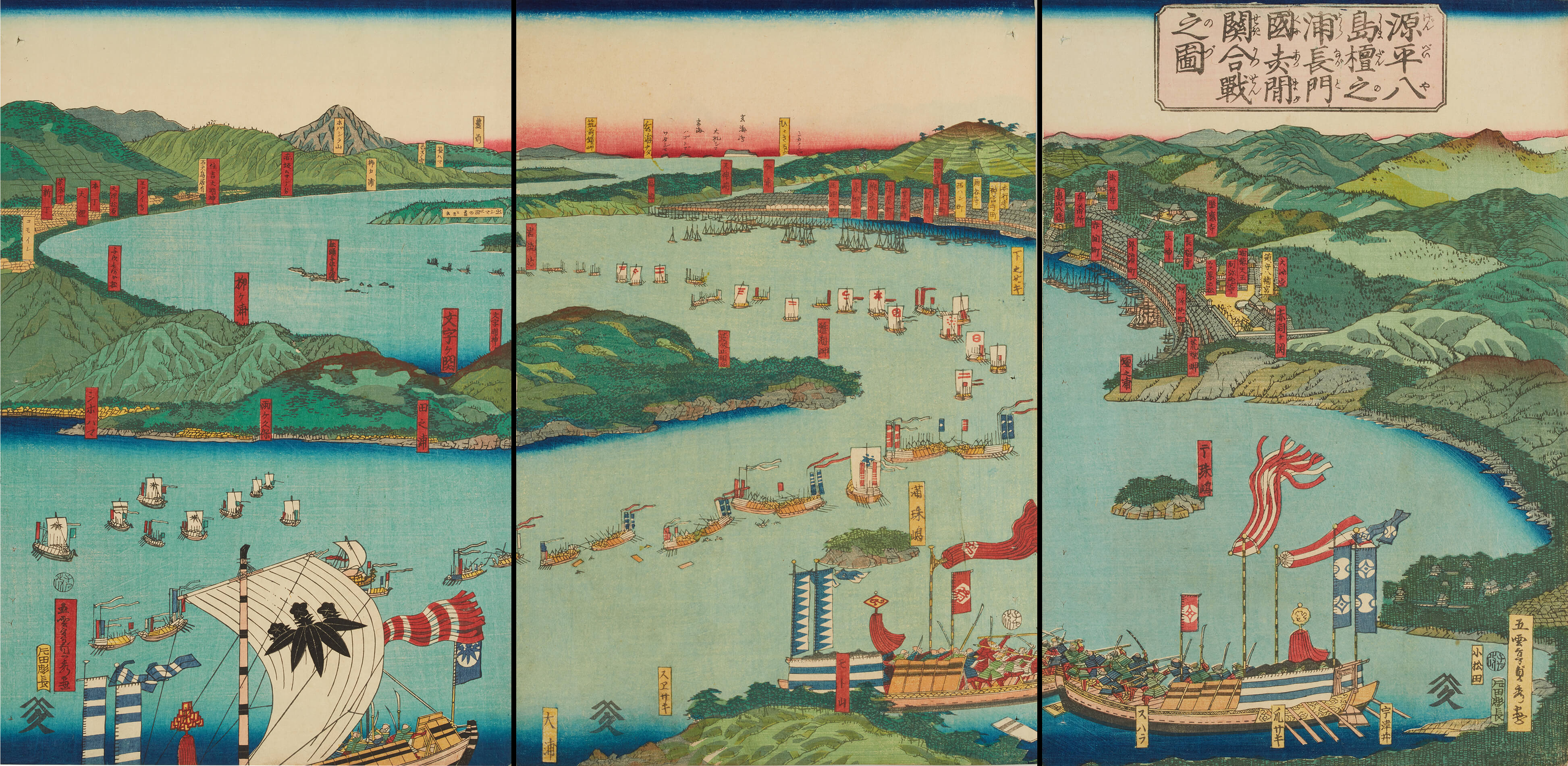
The Battle of Akama Strait at Dan no Ura in Choshu in 1185.

== In culture ==
According to legend, the heike crabs found in the Straits of Shimonoseki are considered by the Japanese to hold the spirits of the Taira warriors.

There is also a famous legend of Yoshitsune's "eight boat jump," a feat described as Yoshitsune leaping across eight consecutive boats to escape Noritsune's attempt at dragging him into the sea with him. However, it's more likely he only leaped one boat and later descriptions simply exaggerated this.

The battle is featured in Masaki Kobayashi's 1964 film Kwaidan, in the film's third act, titled "Hoichi the Earless".

The battle is the subject of an opera by the Thai-American composer S. P. Somtow. Called Dan no Ura, the opera premiered in Bangkok in 2014.

The 2021 animated film Inu-Oh also references the battle in its exposition.

Episodes 10 and 11 of the 2021 Naoko Yamada animated series The Heike Story portray this battle.

The video game Ghost of Tsushima briefly mentions the battle during the second act.

== See also ==
- Shimonoseki
- The Tale of the Heike
