= Taira no Tsunemori =

Japanese samurai

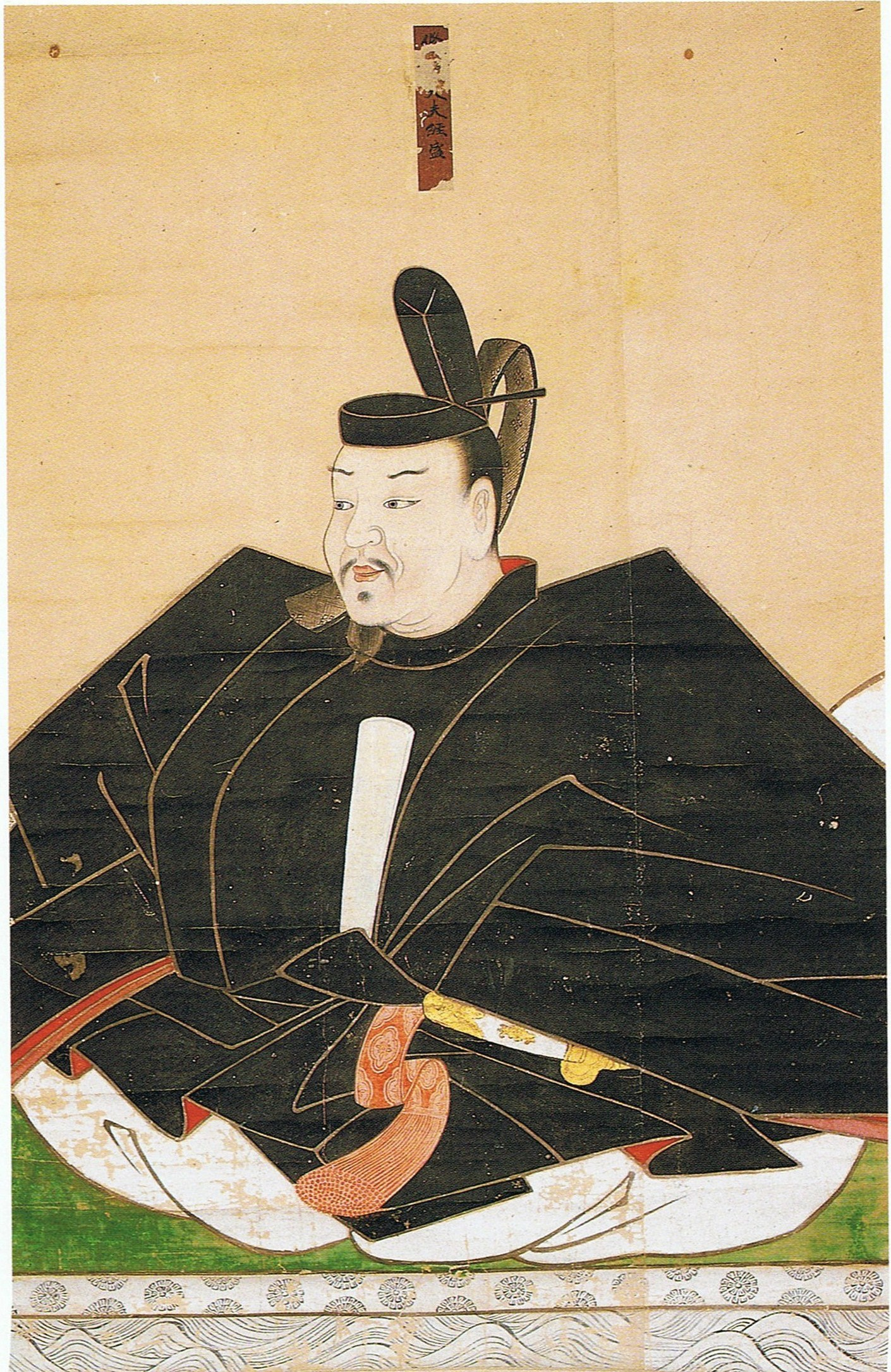
Taira no Tsunemori

Taira no Tsunemori (Japanese: 平經盛 たいら の つねもり) (1124–1185) was the 3rd son of Taira no Tadamori and a younger half-brother of Taira no Kiyomori. He wrote poetry and held multiple competitions. He committed suicide with his younger brother, Taira no Norimori, at the Battle of Dan-no-ura, the last battle of the Genpei War.
