= Yamana Toyokuni =

Japanese samurai

- 山名 豊国
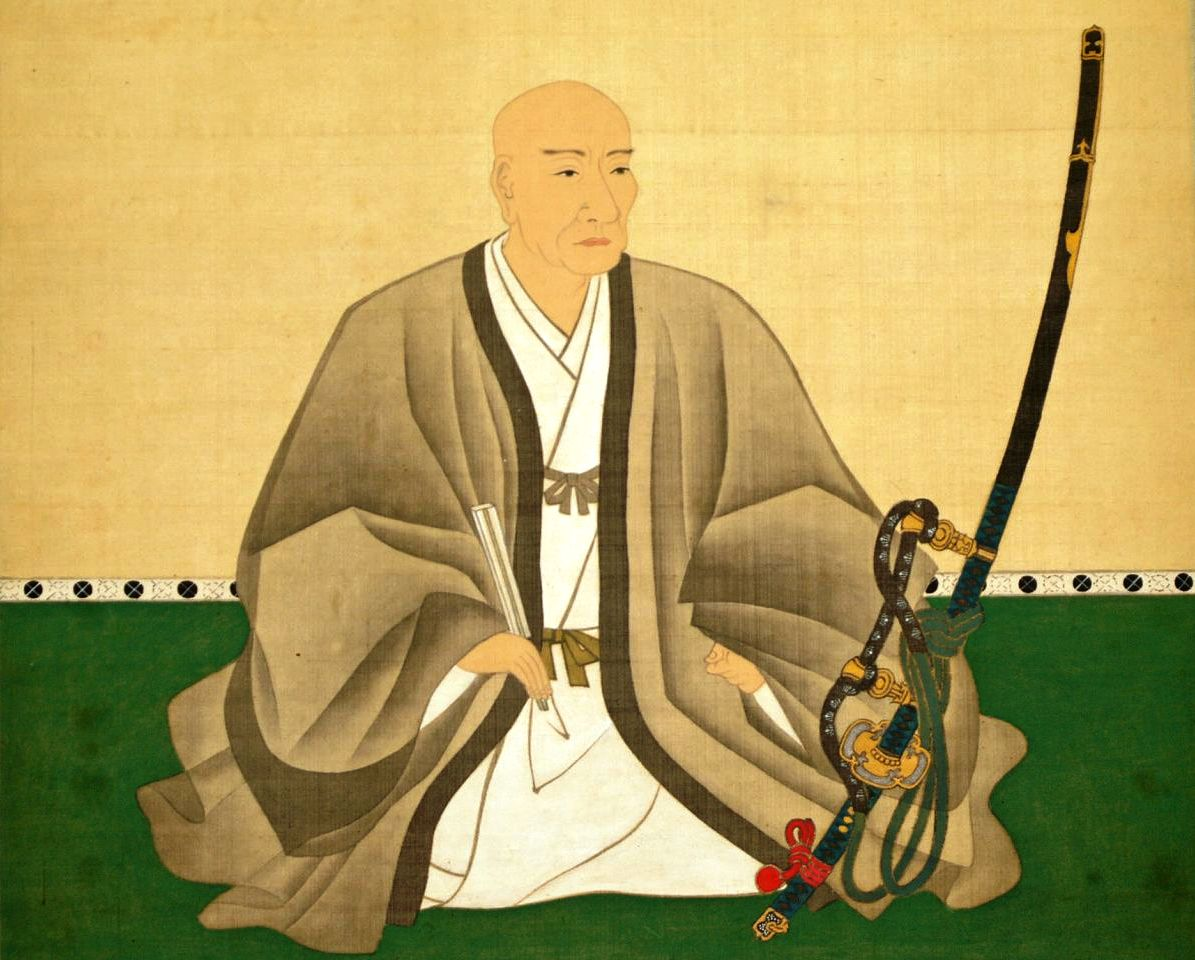
- Yamana Toyokuni
- Born: 1548; Tajima Province
- Died: 25 November 1626 (aged 77–78)
- Relatives: Yamana Toyosada (father), Yamana Suketoyo (father-in-law)
- Military career
- Rank: Daimyō
- Commands: Iwai Castle, Tottori Castle
- Conflicts: Siege of Tottori; Battle of Sekigahara

Yamana Toyokuni (山名 豊国; 1548–1626) was a Japanese samurai and commander of the Sengoku period. He was the head of the Inaba Yamana clan and Shugo of the Inaba.

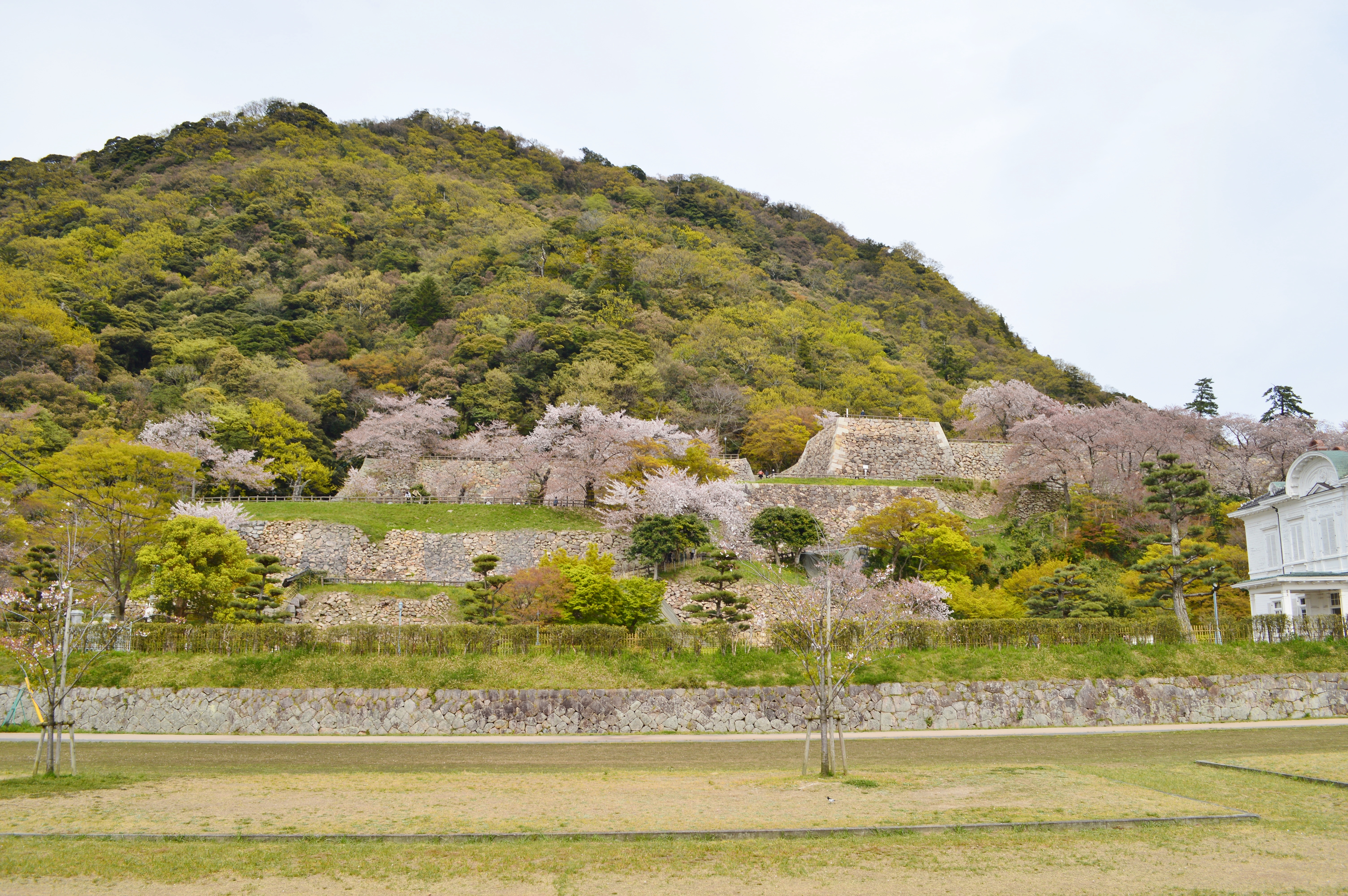
Tottori Castle

In 1574, Toyokuni allied with Amago Katsuhisa for an attempted invasion to capture Tajima and Inaba provinces.

In 1581, his Tottori Castle was besieged by the Oda Nobunaga's army led Hashiba Hideyoshi. After three months of the Siege, Toyokuni surrendered. Thereafter, he became a masterless samurai for a while.

In 1600, at the Battle of Sekigahara, he joined the Western army and after the battle he was given small territory in the Tajima Province by Tokugawa Ieyasu.
