= Kajiwara Heima =

Kajiwara Heima (梶原 平馬; 1842?-1889) was a Japanese samurai of the late Edo period who was a retainer of the Aizu domain.

== Life ==
Kajiwara served as a karō (house elder) in the Aizu administration, and supervised political affairs during the Boshin War, also attending to matters of arms procurement. After the war, he went to Nemuro, and died there. His grave in Nemuro was discovered in 1988.

== Genealogy ==
Kajiwara claimed descent from the Kamakura period warrior Kajiwara Kagetoki.
