= Taira no Noritsune =

Japanese warrior

Taira no Noritsune (平 教経)
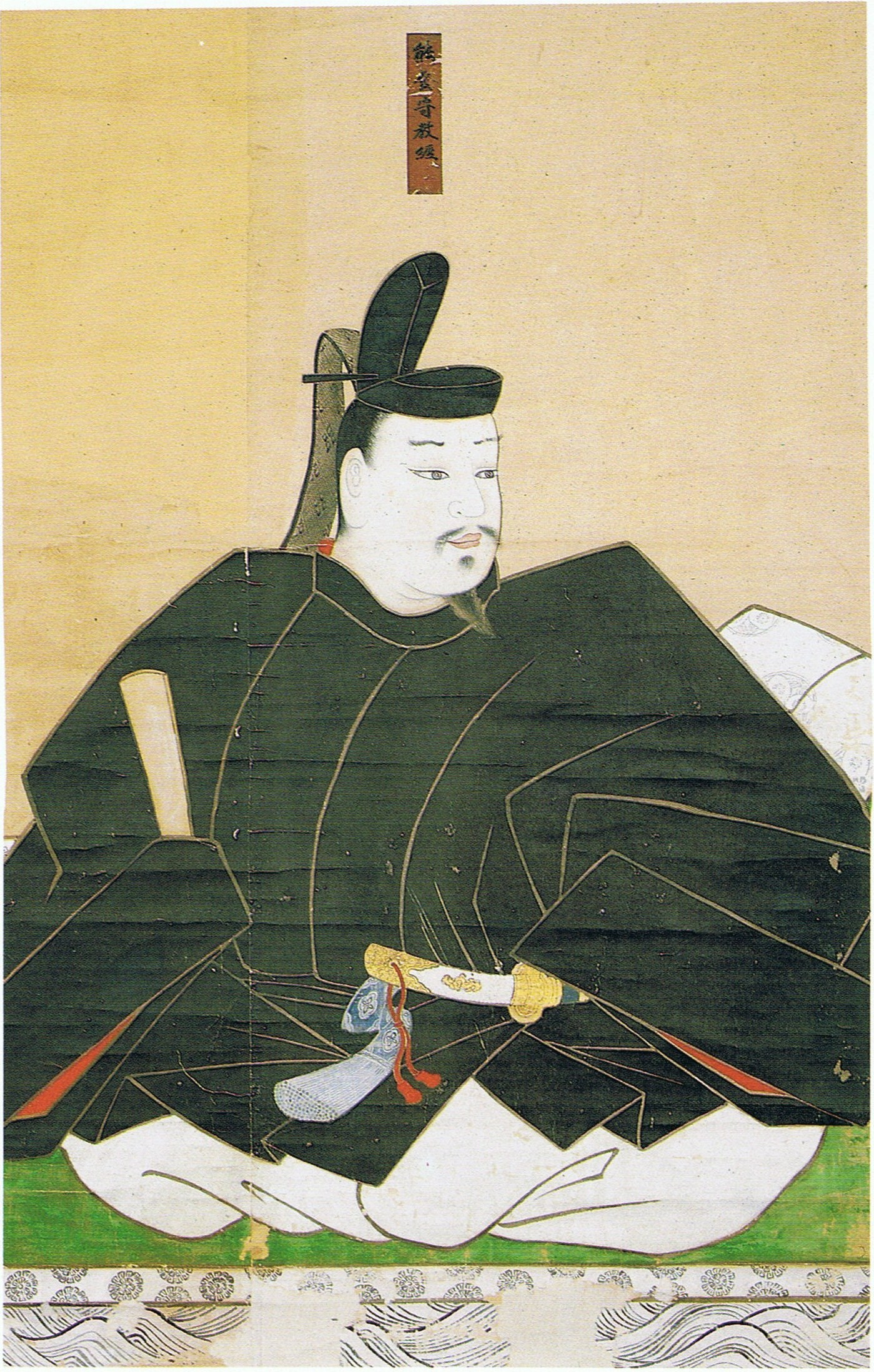
- Born: 1160
- Died: 1185 (aged 24–25)
- Occupation: Military leader

Taira no Noritsune (平 教経; Japanese pronunciation: [taꜜi.ɾa no | no.ɾʲiꜜ.tsɯ.ne], 1160 – 1185) was a military leader of the late Heian period of Japan. He was the son of Taira no Norimori. The father and son both fought in the Genpei War against the Minamoto clan.

== Genpei War ==
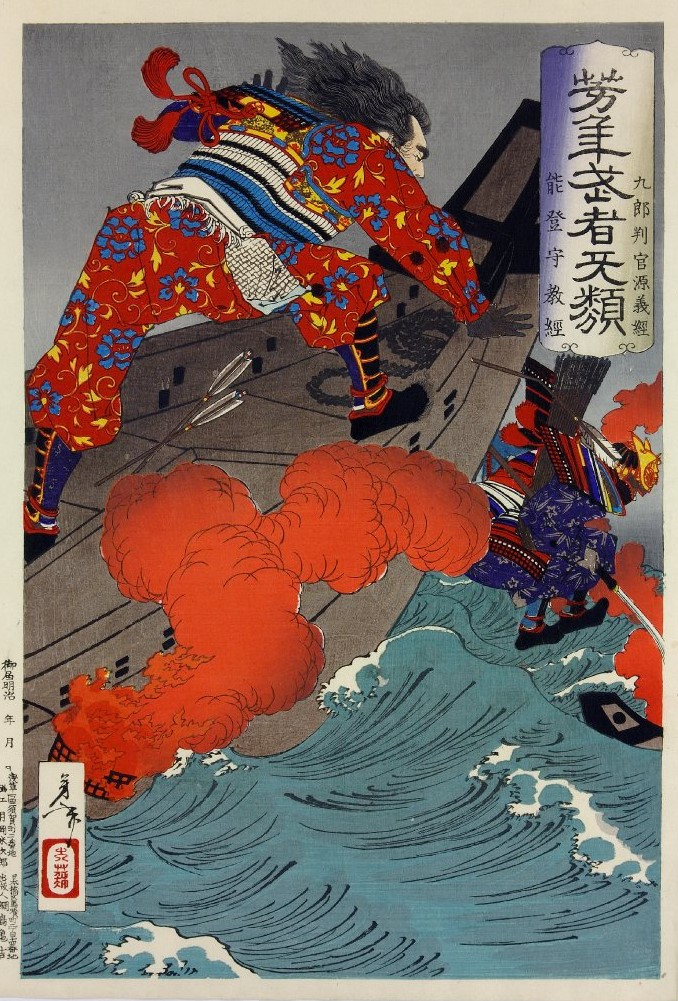
Taira no Noritsune (left) in the Battle of Dan no ura by Tsukioka Yoshitoshi

Noritsune was a commander during the Genpei War. He fought in many battles including the battles of Mizushima and Dan-no-ura. He also fought in the Battle of Ichi-no-Tani, and killed Satō Tsugunobu in the Battle of Yashima.

== Death ==
He committed suicide in the Battle of Dan-no-ura, while holding a Minamoto warrior under each arm plunging into the sea. His father also committed suicide at the same battle. In the play, he is disguised as the priest 'Yokawa no Kakuhan', until he is forced to confess his true identity by Benkei.

== See also ==
- The Tale of Heike
