= Battle of Yashima =

Part of the Genpei War (March 22, 1185)

- Part of the Genpei War
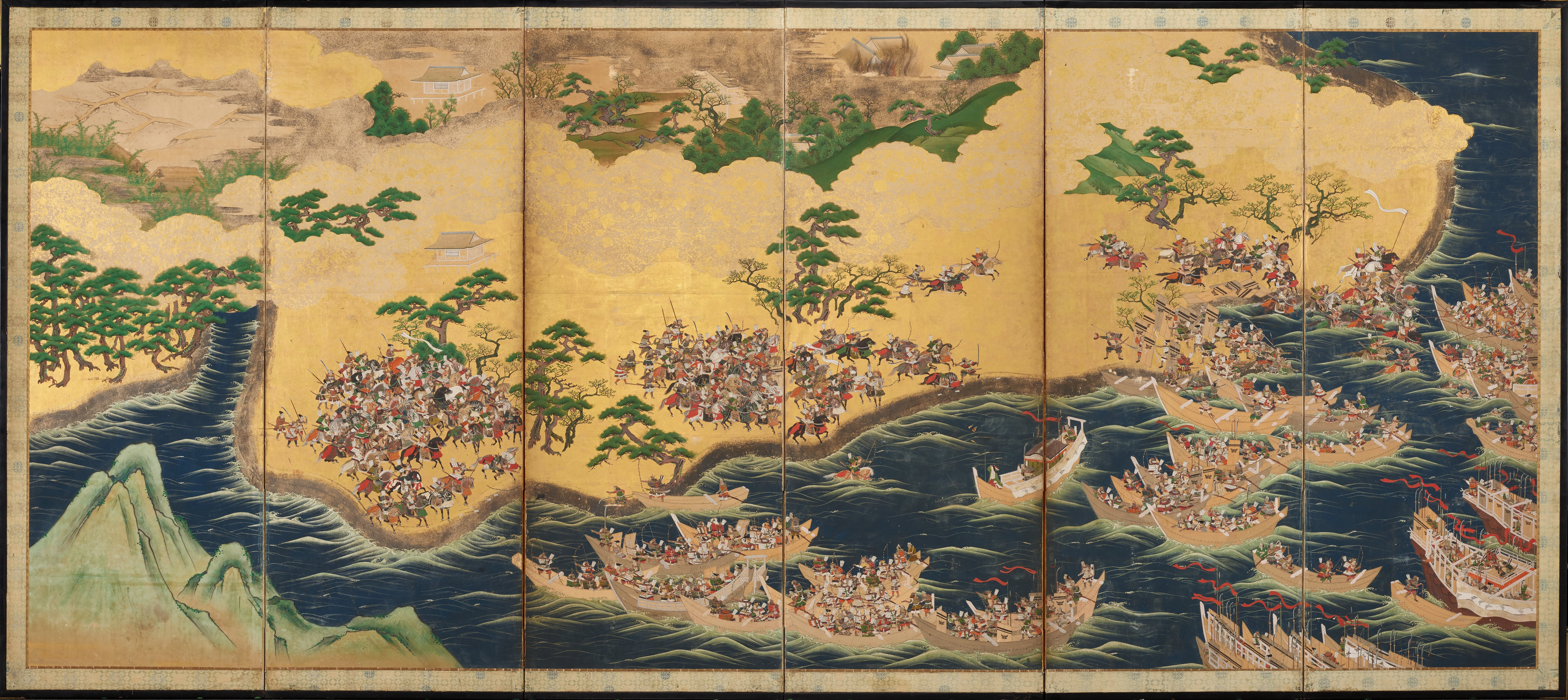
- Battle of Yashima folding screens
Date	March 22, 1185
Location	Yashima, just off Shikoku in the Seto Inland Sea 34°20′44″N 134°07′20″E
Result	Minamoto victory

Belligerents
Minamoto clan	Taira clan

Commanders and leaders
Minamoto no Yoshitsune	Taira no Munemori; Taira no Noritsune

Strength
140 ships, 1,000 Cavalry, 30,000 horses	Unknown

Casualties and losses
Satō Tsugunobu	Unknown
- Location within Japan

Battle of Yashima (屋島の戦い) was one of the battles of the Genpei War on March 22, 1185, in the Heian period. It occurred in Sanuki Province (Shikoku), which is now Takamatsu, Kagawa.

== Background ==
Following a long string of defeats, the Taira clan retreated to Yashima, today's Takamatsu, just off the coast of Shikoku. Here they had a fortress, and an improvised palace for Emperor Antoku and the imperial regalia, which they had taken earlier in the war.

== Battle ==
On the 18th, a Minamoto force tried to cross the sea but many of the boats were damaged in a storm. Kajiwara Kagetoki then suggested adding "reverse oars" to the boats, which prompted an argument from Minamoto no Yoshitsune. Finally after the boats were repaired and despite the high winds, Yoshitsune departed with only five of the 200 boats carrying about 150 of his men. After arriving in Tsubaki Bay, in Awa Province, Yoshitsune advanced into Sanuki Province through the night reaching the bay with the Imperial Palace at Yashima, and the houses in Mure and Takamatsu.

The Taira were expecting a naval attack, and so Yoshitsune lit bonfires on Shikoku, essentially in their rear, fooling the Taira into believing that a large force was approaching on land. They abandoned their palace, and took to their ships, along with Emperor Antoku and the imperial regalia.

In a memorable account in the Heike monogatari, a "very beautiful lady" in a Heike boat, placed a fan atop a pole, and dared the Minamoto to knock it off. In one of the most famous archery feats in all of Japanese history, Nasu no Yoichi rode out into the sea on horseback, and did just that in one shot. The Minamoto were victorious, but the majority of the Taira fleet escaped to Dan-no-ura, where they were defeated one month later in the Battle of Dan-no-ura.

== Gallery ==
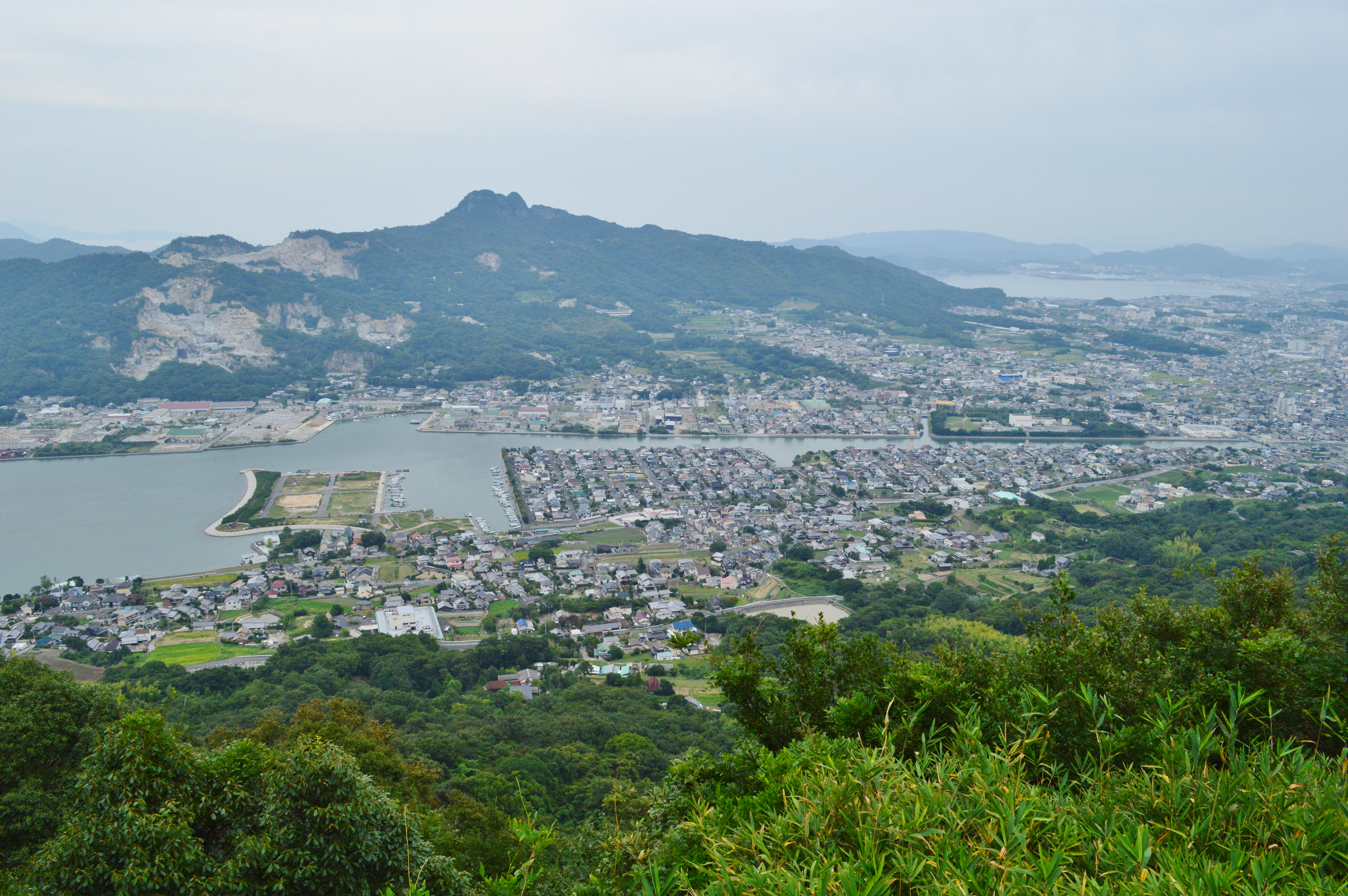
Location of the battlefield

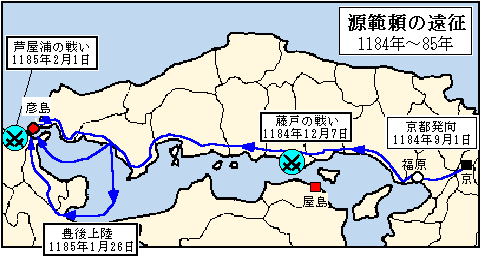
Movement of Minamoto forces in blue

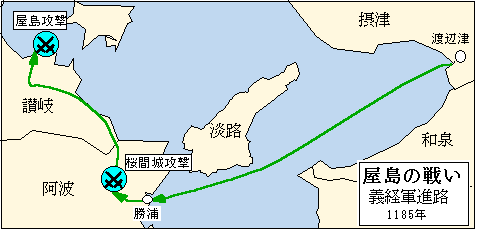
Battle movement at Yashima

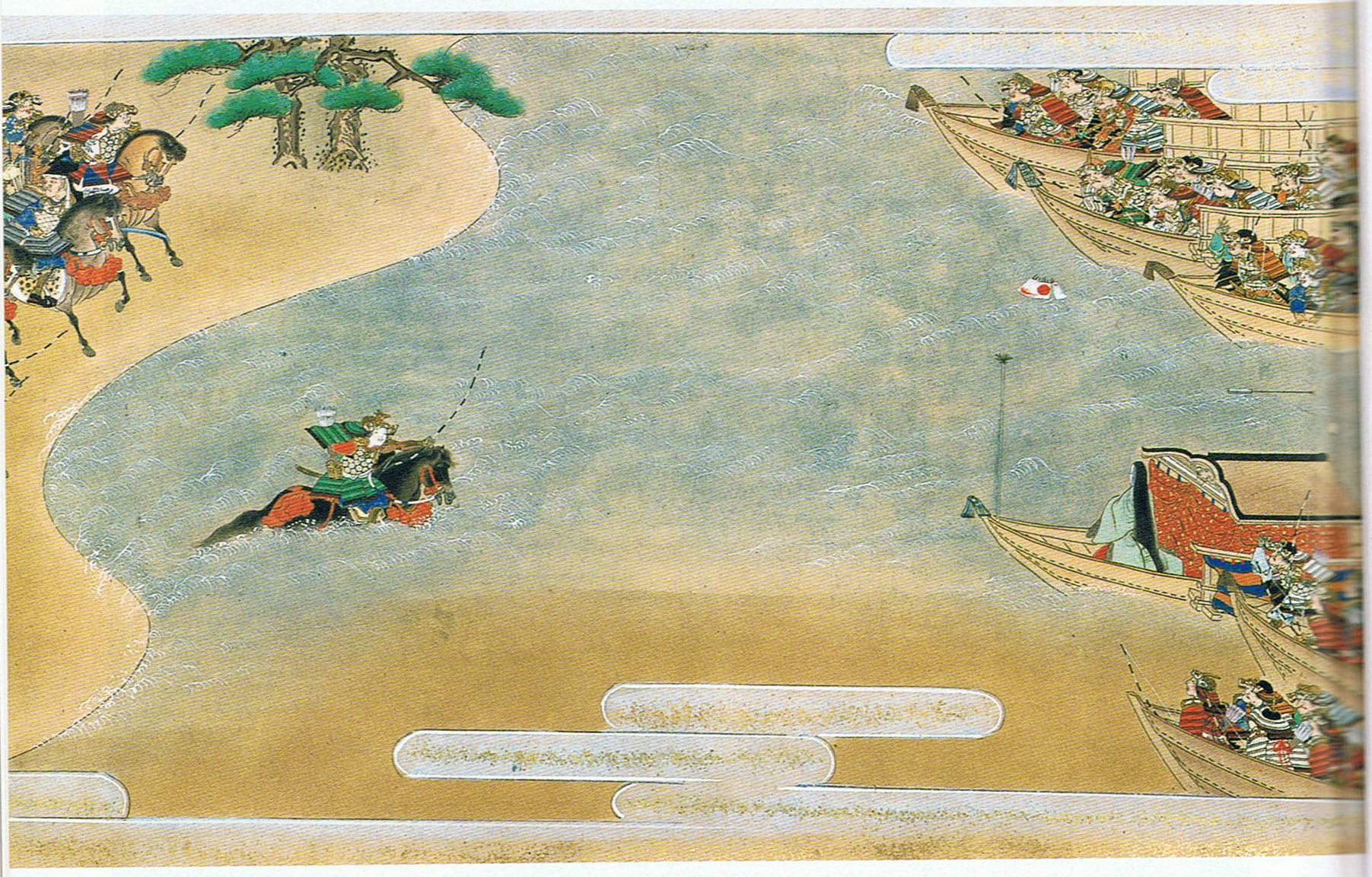
Nasu no Yoichi firing his famous shot at a fan atop the mast of a Taira ship. From a hanging scroll, Watanabe Museum, Tottori Prefecture, Japan.

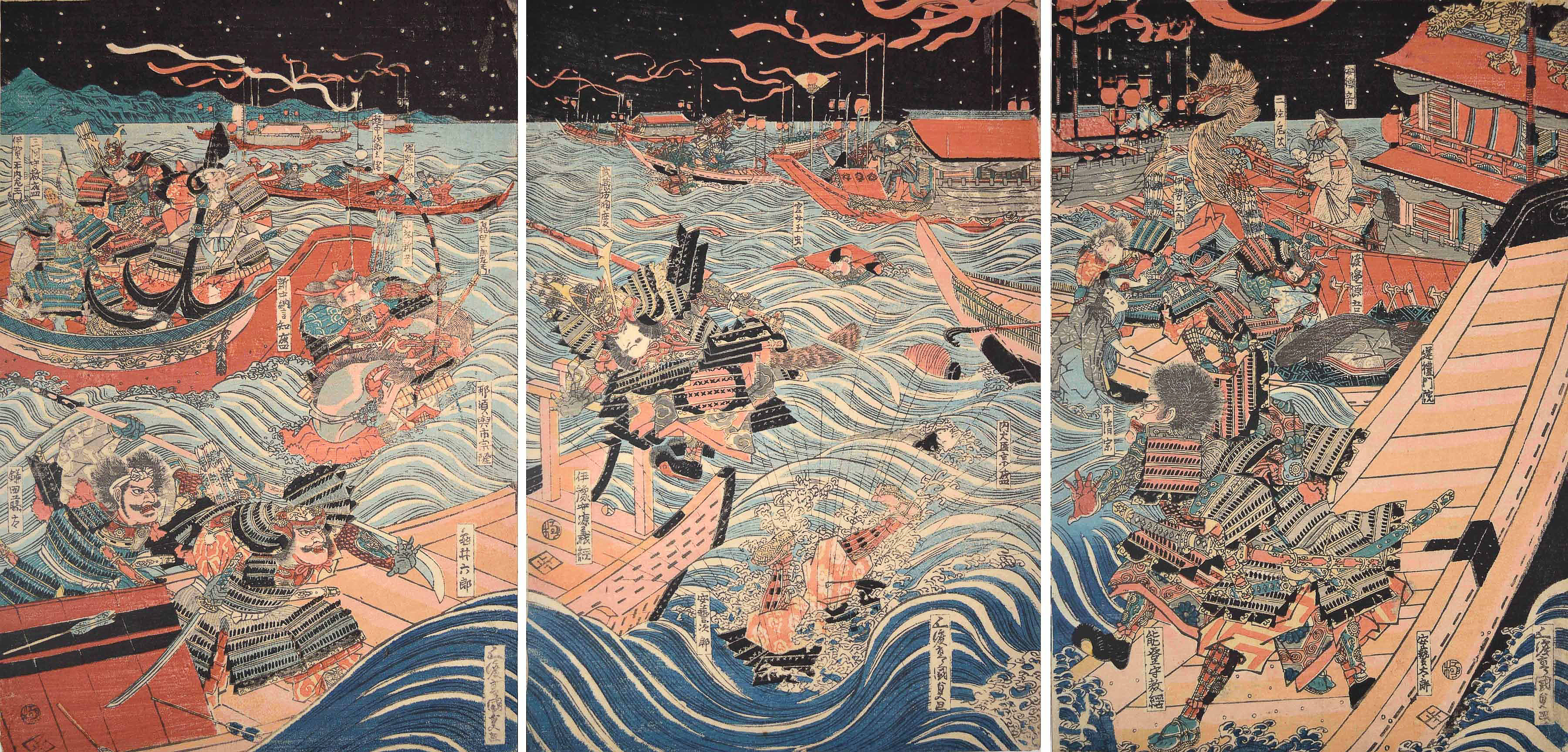
Battle of Yashima by Utagawa Kunisada

== See also ==
- Satō Tsugunobu
- The Tale of Heike
