= Kajiwara Kagetoki =

Samurai in the Kamakura Shogunate

Kajiwara Kagetoki (梶原 景時)
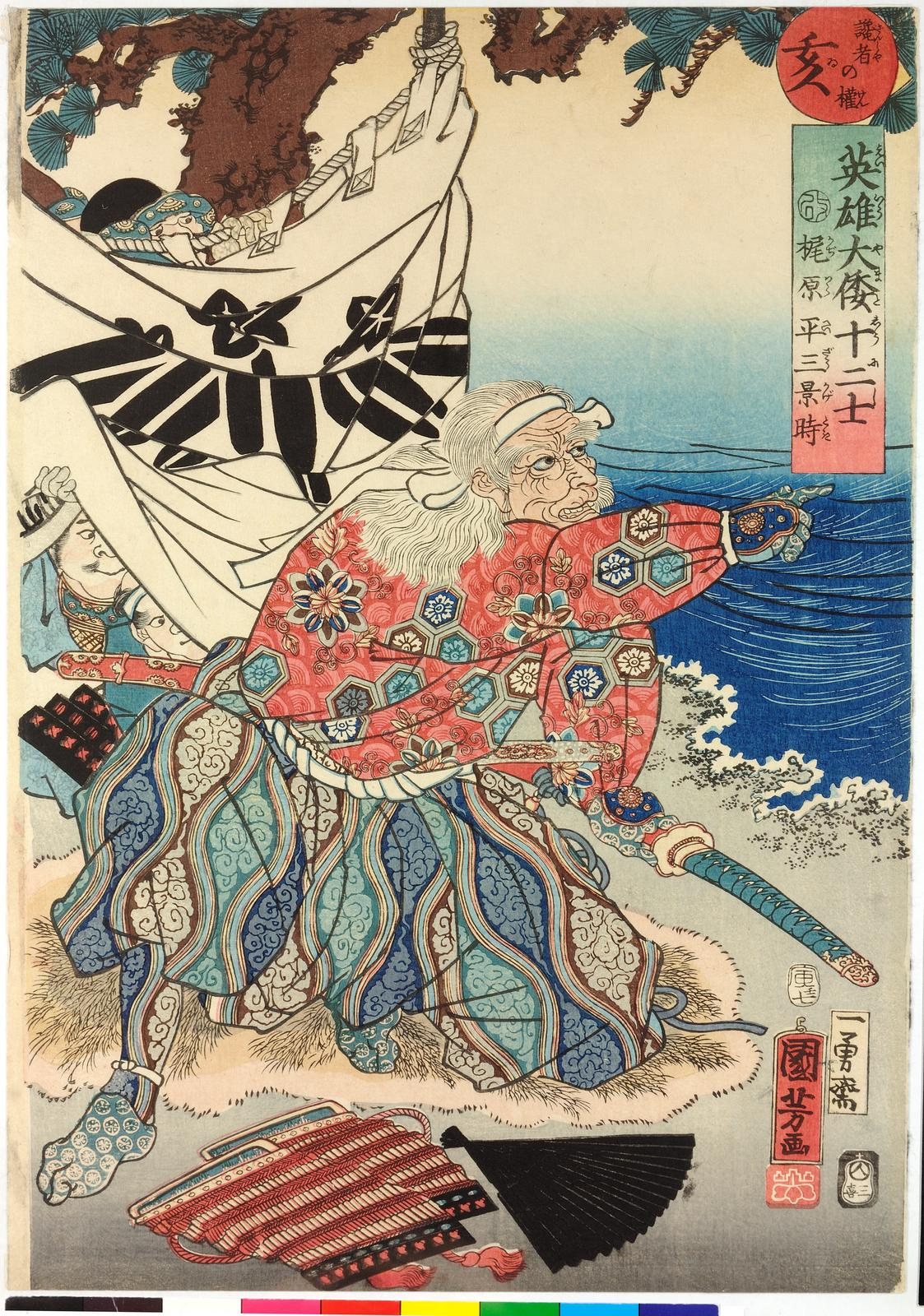
- Japanese Heroes for the Twelve Signs: Boar – Kajiwara Heizo Kagetoki by Utagawa Kuniyoshi (1854)
- Born: c. 1140
- Died: 1200
- Occupation: Samurai

Kajiwara Kagetoki (梶原 景時; c. 1140 – February 6, 1200) was a Japanese samurai and retainer of the Kamakura Shogunate during the late Heian and early Kamakura period. He was a spy for Minamoto no Yoritomo in the Genpei War, and a warrior against the Taira clan. He came to be known for his greed and treachery. He was a prominent eastern warrior and supplied Minamoto no Yoshitsune with a number of ships after the Battle of Yashima.

== Life ==
Originally from Suruga Province, Kajiwara entered the Genpei War fighting under Ōba Kagechika, against the Minamoto.

After the Taira victory at Ishibashiyama in 1181, he was sent to pursue the fleeing Minamoto no Yoritomo. Having discovered him, Kajiwara switched sides, leading his forces in another direction, and turning to Yoritomo's cause.

Three years later, Kajiwara would lead the forces of Minamoto no Yoshitsune and Yoritomo into battle against their cousin Yoshinaka, and against the Taira.

Attached to Yoshitsune's force, Kajiwara reported back to Yoritomo on Yoshitsune's actions, in order to satisfy Yoritomo's suspicion and distrust of his brother. In one particular episode related in The Tale of the Heike, Kajiwara suggests, during the Battle of Yashima, that Yoshitsune equip the Minamoto ships with "reverse oars" should they need to retreat quickly. Yoshitsune responds with distaste to Kajiwara's advice, humiliating him by saying such an act would be cowardice. From that point until Yoritomo's death, the resentful Kajiwara did as much as he could to raise tensions between the brothers. His slander led Yoritomo, already suspicious of his younger brother, to eventually accuse Yoshitsune of plotting against the bakufu, which then led to his exile and eventual death.

Even after this, when the shogunate was successfully and firmly established, Kajiwara still caused tensions at court. He accused Yuki Tomomitsu of plotting against the Shōgun Minamoto no Yoriie; a number of members of the court tried to get rid of him, who eventually left for Suruga. The following year (1200), he was defeated and killed in battle along with his son Kagesue.

== Genealogy ==
Kajiwara Heima, a senior retainer of the Aizu domain in the 19th century, claimed descent from Kagetoki. His formal name, Kagetake (景武) shares a character with Kagetoki's name.

== See also ==
- List of people in The Tale of the Heike
- The Tale of Heike
