= Minamoto no Kanetsuna =

Minamoto no Kanetsuna (源 兼綱, died 1180) was a son of Minamoto no Yorimasa.

Kanetsuna participated in the first Battle of Uji in 1180 that opened the Genpei War. He accompanied his father, Yorimasa, and brother, Nakatsuna, in opposing the Taira clan. In the Battle of Uji, the commander, Minamoto no Yorimasa, realized that his forces were unable to stop the powerful Taira from advancing. Yorimasa decided to retreat to defend Byōdō-in temple with his army and sōhei, so-called "warrior monks" of feudal Japan. Taira samurai, in pursuit of Yorimasa, soon besieged the temple. Yorimasa was struck in the right elbow by an arrow. Yorimasa's sons, Kanetsuna and Nakatsuna, held off the Taira while their father committed seppuku. Kanetsune was struck under his helmet by an arrow while Nakatsuna fell mortally wounded before joining his father in ritual death. Yorimasa's head was taken by one of his own retainers, weighted by a rock, and sunk in the Uji River.
