= Tsutsui Jōmyō Meishū =

Warrior monk

Tsutsui no Jōmyō Meishū (筒井浄妙明秀) was a warrior monk (sōhei) from Mii-dera who fought alongside Minamoto no Yorimasa and his fellow monks at the Battle of Uji in 1180, defending the Byōdō-in and Prince Mochihito from the Taira clan.

Later, in the same account, Gochi-in no Tajima is replaced on the bridge by his comrade, Tsutsui. Standing upon the broken bridge of Uji, Kyoto, Tsutsui fought off the Taira samurai with bow and arrow, naginata, sword, and dagger.

According to The Tale of the Heike:

And loosing off his twenty-four arrows like lightning flashes he slew twelve of the Heike soldiers and wounded eleven more. One arrow yet remained in his quiver, but flinging away his bow he stripped off his quiver and threw that after it, cast off his footwear and springing barefoot on to the beams of the bridge he strode across. [...] With his naginata he mows down five of the enemy, but with the sixth the naginata snaps asunder in the midst, and flinging it away, he draws his tachi, wielding it in the zig-zag style, the interlacing, cross, reversed dragonfly, waterwheel and eight-sides-at-once styles of swordfighting, thus cutting down eight men; but as he brought down the ninth with an exceedingly mighty blow on the helmet the blade snapped at the hilt and fell with a splash into the water beneath. Then, seizing his tantō, which was the only weapon he had left, he plied it as one in a death fury. It is said that Tsutsui counted 63 arrows sticking out of his armor at the end of his stand, which is not unlikely considering the structure and material composition of samurai armor.
