= Hasebe Nobutsura =

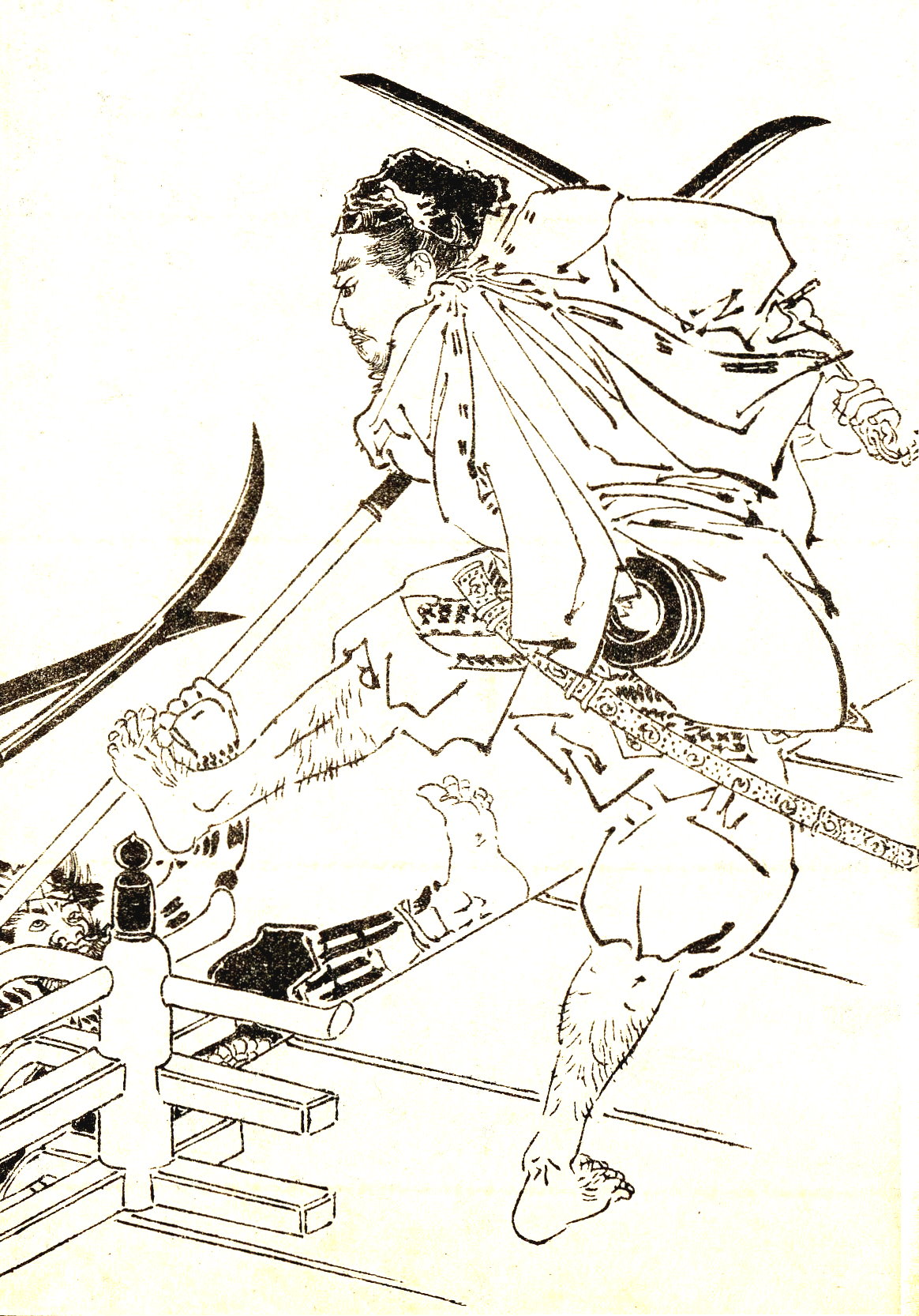
Hasebe Nobutsura fighting hard from Zenken-Kojitsu,『前賢故実』written in latter half of Yedo period about biography of historically notable people

Hasebe Nobutsura (Japanese: 長谷部 信連（はせべ のぶつら)) (year of birth unknown - Kempo-6 (1218) was a military commander between the end of Heian period and the beginning of Kamakura period. He was the son of Tametsura who was an officer for managing horses, Uma-no-jo (右馬允)

== History ==
Nobutsura's character was brave and fearless. He once captured a robber getting into Tokiwa-den as a Takiguchi musha (滝口武者), the guard of Inner Palace. He was promoted to the director of the left part of center palace guard, Sahyoe-no-kami (左兵衛尉) as he was highly evaluated for capturing the robber.

Later, Nobutsura served Prince Mochihito. In Jishō-4 (1180), Prince Mochihito plotted an attack against the Taira clan with Minamoto no Yorimasa, one of the Minamoto clan families. However, the plot leaked before implementation. Nobutsura helped the prince escape from the Imperial Palace to Mii-dera. Nobutsura continued fighting alone against Imperial Guards, Kebiishi (検非違使), using only a ceremonial sword, defeated only when the end of the sword broke off. He then tried to commit suicide, instead of being defeated, but he had lost his dagger and so could not. Prince Mochihito and Minamoto no Yorimasa were forced into the Battle of Uji before they were prepared.

Nobutsura was captured although he fought tremendously. He did not even intend to tell where the prince was and never yielded to Taira no Munemori's cross-examination. Taira no Kiyomori admired his braveness and lessened Nobutsura's punishment to banishment to Hino District, Hōki Province.

After the fall of the Taira clan, Minamoto no Yoritomo dispatched Nobutsura to Kebiishi in Aki Province and awarded him a large portion of Suzu District, Noto Province.

His descendants lasted and called themselves the Cho clan (長氏) and served the Maeda clan during the Edo period.

== See also ==
- Azuma Kagami
- Genpei Jōsuiki
- Dai Nihonshi
- Hasebe clan

== Sources ==
- Clements, J., A Brief History Of The Samurai: The True Story Of The Warrior
