= Minamoto no Nakatsuna =

Japanese samurai (died 1180)

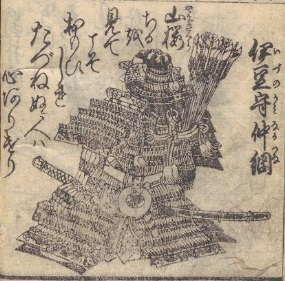
Minamoto no Nakatsuna by Utagawa Sadahide

Minamoto no Nakatsuna (died 1180) was a Japanese samurai lord. He was the elder son of Minamoto no Yorimasa, and fought in the Battle of Uji in 1180, during the Genpei War. Together with his father and younger brother Minamoto no Kanetsuna, the three fought against the Taira clan. However, they were unable to defeat the enemy so they safely returned to Byōdō-in temple for a short time. While Yorimasa's sons defended the temple, Yorimasa committed seppuku rather than surrender. Nakatsuna soon followed.
