= Ichirai =

Japanese warrior monk

Ichirai (一来, died 1180) was a Japanese warrior monk who supported the Minamoto clan of samurai against their rivals, the Taira clan.

Ichirai-hōshi is best known for his part in the battle of Uji. He was fighting behind Tsutsui Jōmyō Meishū on the Uji bridge, but he could not fight alongside his ally as the beams were so narrow. He is said to have leapt over the other monk, taken over the brunt of the fighting, and continued until he fell.
