= Amatsuki =

Japanese manga series

- Cover of Amatsuki volume 1 as published by Ichijinsha

あまつき
- Manga
- Written by: Shinobu Takayama
- Published by: Ichijinsha
- Magazine: Monthly Comic Zero Sum
- Original run: 2002 – August 28, 2017
- Volumes: 24
- Anime television series
- Directed by: Kazuhiro Furuhashi
- Produced by: Hiroyuki Omori; Takema Okamura; Yuko Ima
- Written by: Kazuhiro Furuhashi; Chieko Suzuki
- Music by: Mari Fukuhara
- Studio: Studio Deen
- Original network: AT-X, Chiba TV, KBS Kyoto, Nagoya Broadcasting Network, Sun TV
- Original run: April 4, 2008 – June 28, 2008
- Episodes: 13

Amatsuki (あまつき) is a manga series by Shinobu Takayama, serialized in Monthly Comic Zero Sum. A 13 episode anime adaptation produced by Studio Deen premiered on April 4, 2008.

== Plot ==
Tokidoki is a Japanese high school student who, when he fails his history class, is sent to a high-tech history museum that virtually recreates the Edo period to do make-up work. However, what was supposed to be a simple school project becomes more complicated when he is attacked by two supernatural beings known as "the nue" and "the yakou" and loses the vision in his left eye. After he is saved from the nue by a girl named Kuchiha, he realizes that he is no longer wearing the simulation goggles, and is trapped in the virtual Edo. Meanwhile, in the real world, Sensai Corporation, the virtual reality company who made the virtual museum Tokidoki is trapped in, is seen throughout the story.

== Characters ==
=== Main characters ===
Tokidoki Rikugō (六合 鴇時, Rikugō Tokidoki)
Voiced by: Jun Fukuyama
Tokidoki is an easygoing high school student. As a child, he was sent to boarding school by his parents who barely kept in touch with him. He was consequently taken care of by Suoh Kuwata, a law breaker type of guy who became a very important figure in his life, and a young woman named Chitose.
Tokidoki is not good at history, and as a result has to go on a field trip to a museum that has an interactive virtual reality (VR) reproduction of the Edo period. While in the VR world, he is attacked by a nue who seems to be controlled by a small being called "Yakou". He is rescued by a woman (Kuchiha) yielding a sword.
As a consequence of the attack, he loses vision on his left eye and finds himself trapped in this simulation of the Edo period. After becoming acquainted with the virtual universe, he seems to adapt quickly to his new surroundings. He goes under the care of Lord Shamon, a priest who cares after Kuchiha and a guy named Kon, whom he met in the real world before his attack. After meeting some interesting characters, both human and demon, he finds himself having to choose between siding with the demons, or with the humans, who seem to be at war with each other. He is stuck in a gray area, not wanting to choose either side. While in this new universe, Tokidoki is called by some the "Hakutaku," (白紙の者, "the blank page"), as his fate is not foretold by Heaven's Net as is everyone else.
Kon Shinonome (篠ノ女 紺, Shinonome Kon)
Voiced by: Koji Yusa
A member of Tokidoki's high school who is cool-headed and logical, but has a reputation for getting into fights. He was also attacked by the Nue and Yakou, which left him with no sensation in his right arm and trapped in Edo. He arrived two years before Tokidoki, a fact pointed out as strange by the pair as they were both attacked by the Nue on the same day in the present, and acts as Tokidoki's mentor after his arrival. Later on in the story, Kon's memories are altered by Heaven and he no longer remembers the original world he came from, or Tokidoki.
Kuchiha (朽葉)
Voiced by: Romi Park
A swordswoman who has a Dog God (inugami) living inside her, and as a result, is despised by humans. She saved Tokidoki from the nue. At first, she hates optimistic and naive people like Tokidoki, but she warms up to him throughout the course of the series. She usually wears her hair in a long ponytail, and has a big appetite. She and Kon are friends who love to hate each other. When she was a child, her grandfather named her Kuchiha, which means "faded flowers", in hopes that she would be the last of the family. After her grandfather's death, she became unable to tend to herself, and lived alone in the shack where she once lived with her grandfather. It is here that she is discovered by Kanzou, a boy with marked fangs over his teeth. Kuchiha lost the ability to speak, but Kanzou understood her and tended to her needs. One day, he set off to find a place where she would belong, and told her to wait where she was. However, she walked away from where she was supposed to wait, getting lost, and losing Kanzou, who was no longer able to find her. Years later, Kanzou finds her again, explaining that their destinies are bound together, for she is the dog god, and he is the destined servant of the dog god, Shirachigo( Gazu Hyakki Yakō ). Kuchiha, believing that Kanzou abandoned her, refuses to go along with him at first, but she concedes, leaving Toki with these words: "I'm not like you." Recently in the series, she saves Tokidoki from the vortex by fighting the monster and cutting her hair after it got a grip of her. Rikugou jumps in after her, confessing his love and getting bitten in the neck. Kuchiha is stuck in the vortex, with a concerned Tokidoki and Kanzou. Her age is unknown.

=== Other characters ===
Shamon (沙門)
Voiced by: George Nakata
In public, he is a temple priest, but in private, he is a demon hunter. He is Kuchiha's foster father.
Heihachi (平八)
Voiced by: Kenji Nojima
A friend of Tokidoki and Kon. He later becomes friends with Tsuyukusa. He gets teased by Kon for having strange and large eyes. He is severely injured by Imayou, but is healed and brought to health by Tsuyukusa. Later, he helps convince Tsuyukusa to break free from his mad frenzy.
Ginshu (銀朱)
Voiced by: Kenichi Suzumura
One of the four Holy Ones and the High Priestess of the Sakigami shrine. Originally believed to have been cursed by the demon Byakuroku, it was later revealed that his spirit was in fact placed within Byakuroku's body, as an attempt by Bonten to preserve them both (after a battle that would have cost both their lives). Ginshu is actually male, but is referred to as a Princess anyway. It is revealed that Ginshu is actually not the real High Priestess, but a decoy to protect the real High Priestess, Shinshu. He possesses "poison blood" to demons, so when they try to eat him they die.
Shinshu (真朱)
Voiced by: Yuki Matsuoka
Ginshu's younger sister. She can never age and is forever a child, and is actually the real High Priestess and possesses the power of foresight through the use of dreams. She is very innocent and cute, and is very fond of Ginshu. It is hinted that she used to play with Tsuyukusa when he was a child. Shinshu once had the power to alter Heaven's Net, but this was lost as a bargain to save Ginshu after the incident.
Tsuruume (鶴梅)
Voiced by: Marina Inoue
Ginshu's attendant. She has been loyal to Ginshu since she was a child, and heavily quarreled with Shinshu. It is revealed that she is from a well off family, but has chosen to serve Ginshu.
Tadajirō Sasaki (佐々木 只二郎, Sasaki Tadajirō)
Voiced by: Tōru Ōkawa
A government official in charge of demon hunting. He and Shamon are old friends.
Kurotobi (黒鳶)
Voiced by: Daisuke Kirii
A strange person on the orders of Sasaki to watch Tokidoki. He has a pet demon, a Fire Rat. He also knows how to handle demons.
Bonten (梵天)
Voiced by: Junichi Suwabe
A powerful demon with the ability to read fate. He is one of the four Holy Ones. He has known Ginshu since he was a child. On their first encounter Bonten tried to kill Ginshu, but found out that it was futile (as Ginshu revealed he was just a decoy for Shinshu). He was very fond of Ginshu, but unlike Ginshu, he did not like to openly admit it and often spoke to him rudely. He spent most of the winter as a child playing with Ginshu in various games. However, their relationship changed drastically after the priestess of the Sakigami shrine severely injured Tsuyukusa. A bloody battle took place, and as Ginshu and Byakuroku killed each other, a deal was made with Heaven, so that Shinshu's power was transferred to Bonten, and he replaced Byakuroku taking his place as Heaven's Seat.
Tsuyukusa (露草)
Voiced by: Showtaro Morikubo
A kodama (Tree Spirit) who works with Bonten. He resents humans for the death of Byakuroku, but seems to have little trouble befriending them.
Utsubushi (空五倍子)
Voiced by: Jūrōta Kosugi
A tengu who serves Bonten. Utsubushi regards Bonten as his 'father' as he is in fact a collaboration of spirits Bonten had gathered and given form to.
Imayō (今様)
Voiced by: Rei Igarashi
A kitsune who resents humans for the death of her master. She is corrupted by the Yakou after killing humans. She is later saved by Tokidoki, and afterward reverts to her original form.
Byakuroku (白緑)
Voiced by: Ken Narita
An old and powerful snake demon who, at the brink of death after biting into Ginshu's 'poison blood', became the vessel for Ginshu's spirit. He raised Bonten and Tsuyukusa.
Susutake (煤竹)
Voiced by: Ryuzou Ishino
A member of Heaven's seat who is actually the Yakou. He is seen with Bonten, Utsubushi, and Tsuyukusa.
Hizame (緋褪)
Part of the Onmyou Bureau; group that hunts demons; she wears a cloth over her eye. She is a refined woman, and she had also made an arrangement with Sasaki to give him the power to see demons in exchange for his eyesight. She teases Tokidoki, thinking he likes Kuchiha.

== Media ==
An anime television series is directed by Kazuhiro Furuhashi and produced by Studio Deen. 13 episodes were produced.

No.	Title	Original release date
1	"This Rainy Night's Moon"; Transliteration: "Amatsuki" (Japanese: 雨夜之月(あまつき))	April 4, 2008
After failing another history test, Tokidoki Rikugou goes to a high-tech history museum for a makeup class. The museum creates a virtual Edo period using special goggles and a large room. There Tokidoki meets and befriends Kon Shinonome, a makeup student like himself. Tokidoki speaks with him until Kon suddenly disappears. When Tokidoki comes to a bridge in the exhibit he loses an eye from being attacked by a Nue, and is helpless to do anything until a female samurai named Kuchiha comes to his rescue. When Tokidoki comes to later, he finds out that he may actually be in the Edo time period.
2	"The Voice That Calls To Dogs"; Transliteration: "Inu o Yobu Koe" (Japanese: 狗(いぬ)をよぶ聲(こえ))	April 11, 2008
Tokidoki goes to the temple and is introduced to the monk, Shamon, who tells Tokidoki that like Shinonome, he is stuck in this world with no way of returning home. Tokidoki does not let this bother him and decides he will do his best to do what he can at the temple. When Kuchiha is threatened by some samurai, Tokidoki stands up to fight them, only to have Kuchiha save him in the end, by exposing her secret: she is an inugami-tsuki possessed by a dog spirit. The samurai flee for their lives and Kuchiha gets mad at Tokidoki for having interfered in the first place. Unable to let the samurai get away, Tokidoki convinces Shinonome and the watchman, Heihachi, to help him pull a prank on one of the samurai to teach them a lesson. There he refers to the things he had learned in his era, and uses it against the samurai.
3	"A Monster Along the Way"; Transliteration: "Bakemono Dōchū" (Japanese: 化け物道中(ばけものどうちゅう))	April 18, 2008
A government official shows up asking about a rumor that an ayakashi is taken refuge to the temple. Tokidoki under the pressure admits to the prank he caused. As his punishment he is ordered to go to a temple. Kuchiha and Shinonome accompany him on the journey. They are lost on their way.
4	"Dog God and the Sacred Princess"; Transliteration: "Inugami to Himegami" (Japanese: 狗神(いぬがみ)と姫神(ひめがみ))	April 25, 2008
Tokidoki, Kuchiha, and Shinonome are summoned by the High Priestess, Princess Ginshu, of the Sakigami shrine. Tokidoki is revealed to be the "blank page" (or the "unwritten page") and has the ability to create things by imagining it with his left eye.
5	"Dawn and Awakening"; Transliteration: "Akatsuki to Mezame" (Japanese: 暁(あかつき)と目覚め（めざめ）)	May 2, 2008
Two men prepare to take down a sacred tree, thus showing a flashback of Kuchiha's childhood showing her grandfather. Tsuruume explains that there are many people who rely much on the Princess, and that the ayakashi have been increasing recently. Kuchiha explains to Tokidoki, about her past childhood, and about how her grandfather gave her name, and the kuchi part of her name meaning to rot. Kuchiha and Tokidoki's friendship begins to grow along with Shinonome. The Princess is then introduced, and has explained to Tokidoki and Shinonome, how she is able to live and die again. Tokidoki and Shinonome are quite confused when they see her appearance, but explains why it's like that. Later on, after Tokidoki, and Shinonome have eaten, Ginshu (the Princess) asks for Tokidoki's help. In the end, they show the man who cut down the sacred tree, being affected by the ayakashi's spirit. Shamon was asked for help, leaving Heihachi behind in the temple.
6	"Marks in a Water Channel"; Transliteration: "Miotsukushi" (Japanese: 澪標(みおつくし))	May 9, 2008
Tsuyukusa falls from a tree onto Heihachi who was passing by. He is looking for any strange events. Shinonome explains Tokidoki's personality to Kuchiha. Tadajirō Sasaki admits that he knew Tokidoki was the Hakushi no Mono ('blank page' or 'unwritten page'). Sasaki then goes on and reveals that Shinonome was the first Hakushi no Mono but it was too late when they found out as he had already been there for a year and Teiten has found him and written him into Heaven's Net. The story continues with Tokidoki finding Shinshu crying for Ginshu who is her brother and begging him to lift the curse. Shinshu blames herself as Ginshu was trying to save her when he was cursed. Tokidoki tries to use the Hakutaku (his power) but is unable to. He then calls Bonten for help. Bonten asks him to go to Nihonboshi if he wants to know. Ginshu allows them to go. It ends with Tsuyukusa and Heihachi meeting an ayakashi.
7	"Descending Dawn"; Transliteration: "Akatoki Kutachi" (Japanese: 暁(あかとき)降(くた)ち)	May 16, 2008
Sasaki warns Tokidoki that he'd be keeping an eye on him. Tokidoki says farewell to Shinonome who will be staying behind. Ginshu reveals that the closest to Teiten would have to be Kokuten, who is the yakou. The yakou drives the world mad, which might be Teiten's intent. Ginshu's curse does not kill him, it makes him unable to die. After revealing all this to Shinonome, Ginshu causes him to fall asleep. Ginshu hints that Bonten shed tears once. Bonten hints that he too is cursed. Heihachi reveals that he knew Tsuyukusa is not human since the beginning. They introduce themselves. The ayakashi Inari harms Heihachi.
8	"Silk Flower Sleeps"; Transliteration: "Hakubobana ga Nemuru" (Japanese: 薄暮花(はくぼばな)が眠る)	May 23, 2008
This episode begins with the telling of Kuchiha's past with her grandfather, on how they were worshipped like gods in the village, and then feared because they thought they would be cursed. How Shamon meets Kuchiha is also mentioned. It was then Shamon and the ayakashi inugami in Kuchiha conversed with each other. Shamon volunteered to take in both Kuchiha and the inugami, and the inugami agrees. After that, it becomes a flashback from the point of view of a man, Kosen, who recently became monk that Ginshu is in a prohibited area. He is able to see demons, and despite his family's opposition, he became a monk. Kosen thought that Ginshu is a demon due to the curse, and wanted to chase Ginshu out. Before Kosen joined Ginshu's shrine, he was at Shamon's but left when he thought Shamon was an incompetent monk. Shamon then introduced him to Sakagami Shrine. When Ginshu left, a tengu, which was thought to be a bird by Kosen, spoke to him. Back in the present, Shinonome was in the kitchen, chatting with Kosen on how he was treating Kuchiha like a human despite knowing she was possessed by an Inugami.
9	"Spring Afternoon"; Transliteration: "Shunchū" (Japanese: 春昼(しゅんちゅう))	May 30, 2008
Heihachi is found abandoned in the forest by Bonten and starts to draw his soul out. Tokidoki and Kuchiha find out that Shamon is nearby and go to see him, leaving Shinshu alone at the Pharmacy.
10	"And, The Day Was Shady"; Transliteration: "Soshite, Hi wa Kageri" (Japanese: そして、日(ひ)は陰(かげ)り)	June 6, 2008
11	"Dark and Thick Woods"; Transliteration: "Konokureshige" (Japanese: 木の暗茂(このくれしげ))	June 14, 2008
12	"Both Sides of the Konotegashiwa"; Transliteration: "Konotegashiwa no Futaomote" (Japanese: 児手柏(このてがしわ)の両面(ふたおもて))	June 21, 2008
13	"Whistle of the Wind from a High Peak"; Transliteration: "Takaneoroshi no Mogaribue" (Japanese: 高嶺颪(たかねおろし)の虎落笛(もがりぶえ))	June 28, 2008

== Music ==
Opening Theme

"Casting Dice" by Yuuki Kanno

Ending Theme

"Namae no Nai Michi (名まえのない道; A Road with No Name)" by Kaori Hikita

== Reception ==
Writing in the third edition of The Anime Encyclopedia (2015), Jonathan Clements and Helen McCarthy praised Amatsuki for its attractive visual design and competent screenplay, which drew on both Japanese legends and earlier anime. They compared the motif of a girl harboring a dog deity to elements of Inuyasha, The Hakkenden and Naruto, while the premise of school friends trapped in an unfamiliar world reminded them of El-Hazard and 11eyes. They noted that the series ended after thirteen episodes with its storyline unresolved, leaving room for a second season that had not materialized.

== See also ==
- Haigakura, another manga series by Shinobu Takayama.
