= Prince Mochihito =

Son of Japanese Emperor Go-Shirakawa; initiator of the Genpei War

Prince Mochihito 以仁王
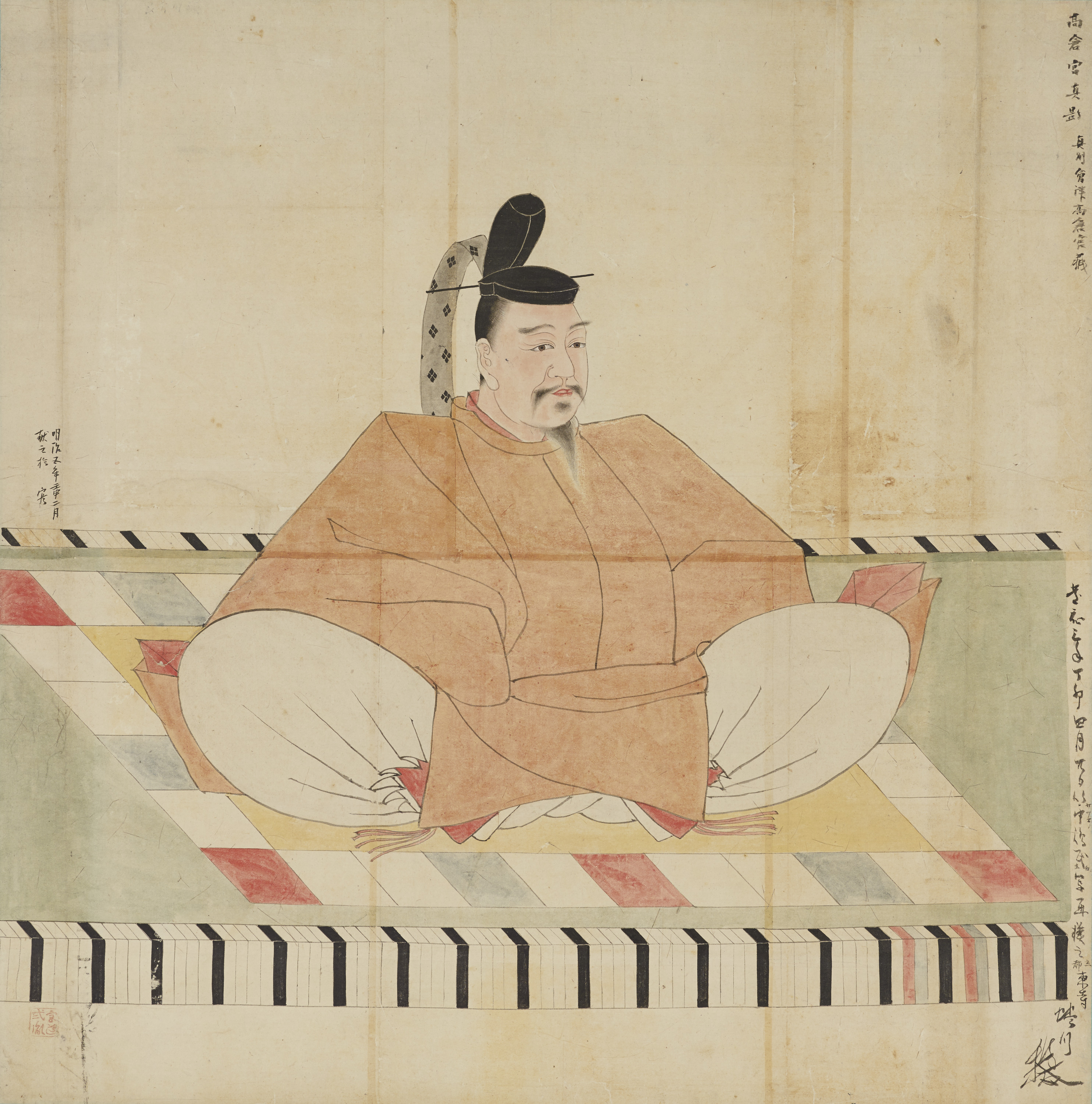
- Born: 1151
- Died: 20 June 1180 (aged 28–29); Kōmyōzen torii, Yamashiro Province
- Cause of death: Shot by arrows while fleeing battle
- Spouse: Sanmi-no-tsubone (Note: Lady-in-waiting to his adopted mother, the Princess Hachijō-in.)
- Issue: Prince Hokuroku; Shinshō; Dōson; Princess Sanjō (Note: Among others, such as another monk named Dōsei and a girl simply known as "Himemiya".)
- House: Imperial House of Japan
- Father: Emperor Go-Shirakawa
- Mother: Fujiwara no Shigeko (biological); Hachijō-in (Princess Shōshi; adoptive)

Prince Mochihito (以仁王, Mochihito-ō) (died June 1180), also known as the Takakura Prince, and as Minamoto no Mochimitsu (源 以光), was a son of Emperor Go-Shirakawa of Japan. He is noted for his role in starting the Genpei War.

Believing that Taira no Kiyomori was causing suffering, Mochihito supported the Minamoto clan in their conflict against the Taira. At the same time, Minamoto no Yorimasa led the Minamoto clan in supporting Mochihito's bid for the Imperial Throne. In May 1180, Yorimasa sent out a call to other Minamoto leaders, and to the monasteries (Enryakuji, Miidera and others) that Kiyomori had offended; he asked for aid against the Taira, in the name of Prince Mochihito.

Learning of this, Kiyomori sent men after Mochihito, who retreated to Miidera, at the foot of Mount Hiei, but discovered that the warrior monks of Miidera, for various political reasons, could not rely on the support of any other monasteries. Thus, he fled once more, along with a small Minamoto force, across the River Uji, to the Phoenix Hall of the Byōdō-in. There they were caught by the Taira forces, and the Battle of Uji was fought. The bridge was the site of much of the fighting, and the planks were famously smashed to impair the ability of the Taira to cross, but eventually the Minamoto were forced back into the Phoenix Hall, where Yorimasa committed seppuku. Mochihito escaped, but was captured on his way and killed soon afterwards.
