= Minamoto no Yorimasa =

12th-century Japanese poet and military commander

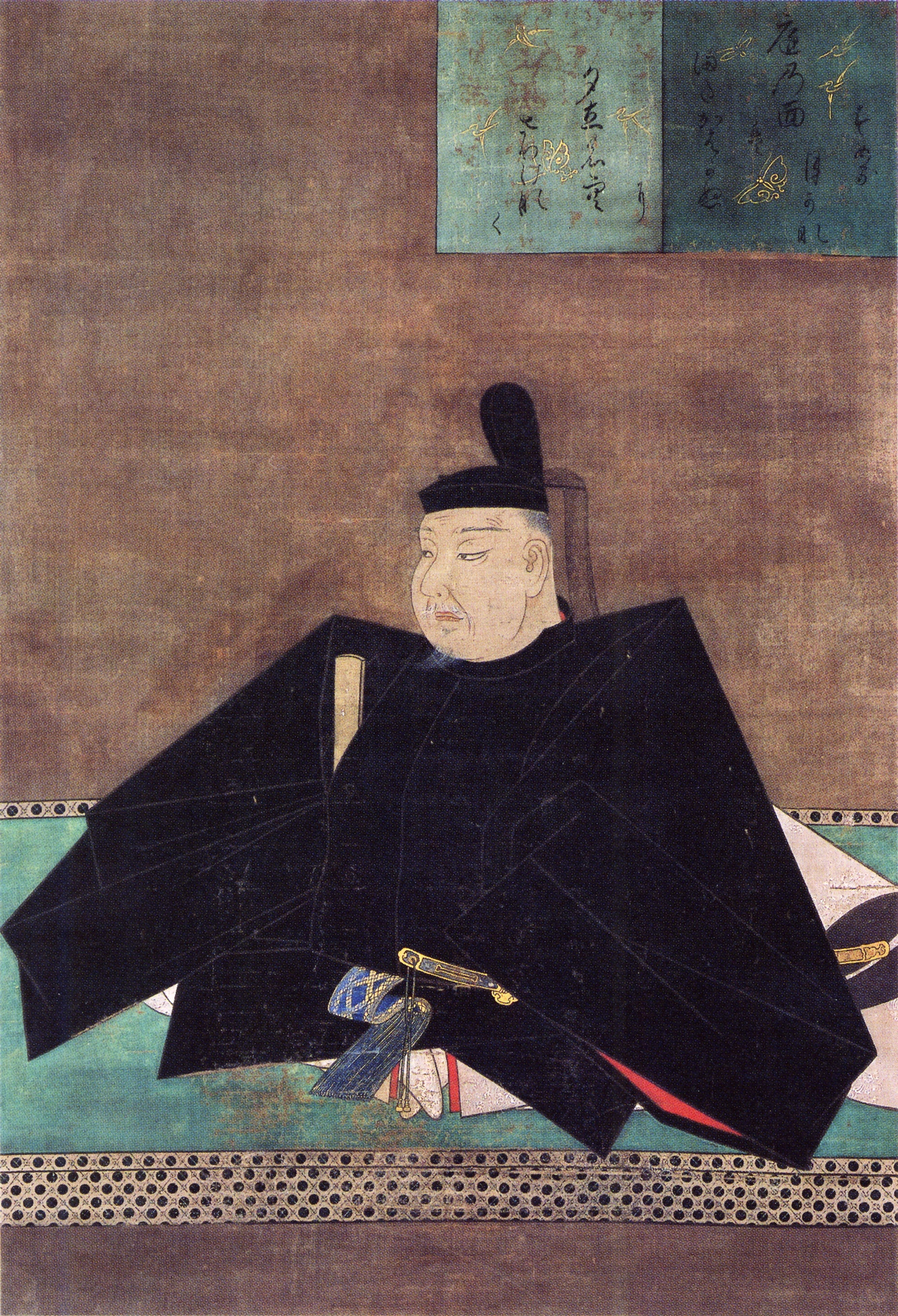
- Native name: 源 頼政
- Born: 1106
- Died: 20 June 1180 (aged 73–74)

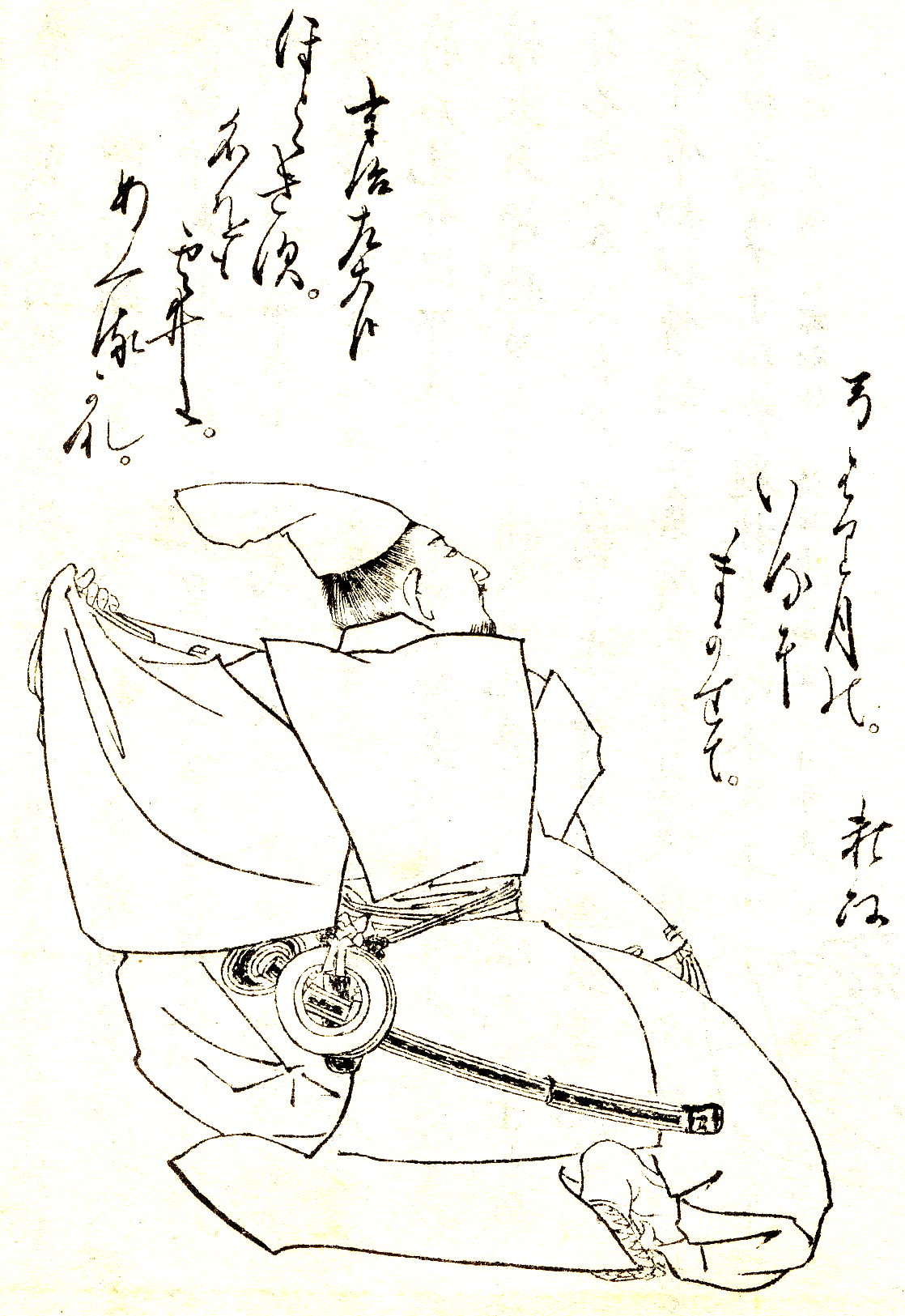
Minamoto no Yorimasa by Kikuchi Yosai

Minamoto no Yorimasa (源 頼政; Japanese pronunciation: [mʲi.na.mo.to no (|) jo.ɾʲiꜜ.ma.sa], 1106 – 20 June 1180) was a Japanese poet, aristocrat and samurai lord. His poetry appeared in various anthologies. He served eight different emperors in his long career, holding posts such as hyōgo no kami (head of the arsenal). As a general, he led the Minamoto armies at the beginning of the Genpei War. Even in later generations, the common name Genzanmi (源三位; [ɡen.dzaꜜm.mʲi]) was passed down (Yorimasa was not the only person who was called “Genzanmi”, in the same period). Also, like his father, he used the surname “Baba” and was also called “Baba no Yorimasa.”

== Biography ==
In the clashes between the Minamoto and Taira clans that had gone on for decades, Yorimasa had tried to stay out of politics, and avoided taking sides. He did participate in the Hōgen rebellion in 1156. For a time, he was even friends with Taira no Kiyomori. During the Heiji rebellion of 1160, he leaned just enough in favor of the Taira that it allowed them to overthrow the Minamoto. However, by the time he officially retired from military service in Kiyomori's army in 1179, Yorimasa had changed his mind about opposing his own clan. He entered the Buddhist priesthood and in May 1180, he sent out an appeal to other Minamoto leaders, and to temples and monasteries that Kiyomori had offended.

In the following Genpei War, which began with the Battle of Uji in 1180, Yorimasa led Minamoto forces, along with warrior monks from Miidera, in defending the Byōdō-in temple. Despite the monks' having torn up the planks of the bridge leading to the temple, the Taira managed to break through their defenses, and take the temple. After suffering this defeat at Uji, he committed ritual suicide at Byōdō-in. Minamoto no Yorimasa's suicide by seppuku may be the earliest recorded instance of a samurai's suicide in the face of defeat, although Minamoto no Tametomo, who died in 1170, ten years before Yorimasa, may hold this distinction. He told Minamoto no Yukiie to give the other members of the Minamoto clan Prince Mochihito’s orders.

According to legend, after his death a retainer took Yorimasa's head to prevent it from falling into the hands of the Taira. He then fastened it to a rock and threw it into the Uji River so it could not be found.

== Family ==
Yorimasa had several children including a daughter, poet Nijōin no Sanuki, and sons, samurai lords Minamoto no Nakatsuna and Minamoto no Kanetsuna. His cousin was Minamoto no Mitsuyuki a poet who was an advisor for Minamoto no Yoritomo.

== Poetry ==
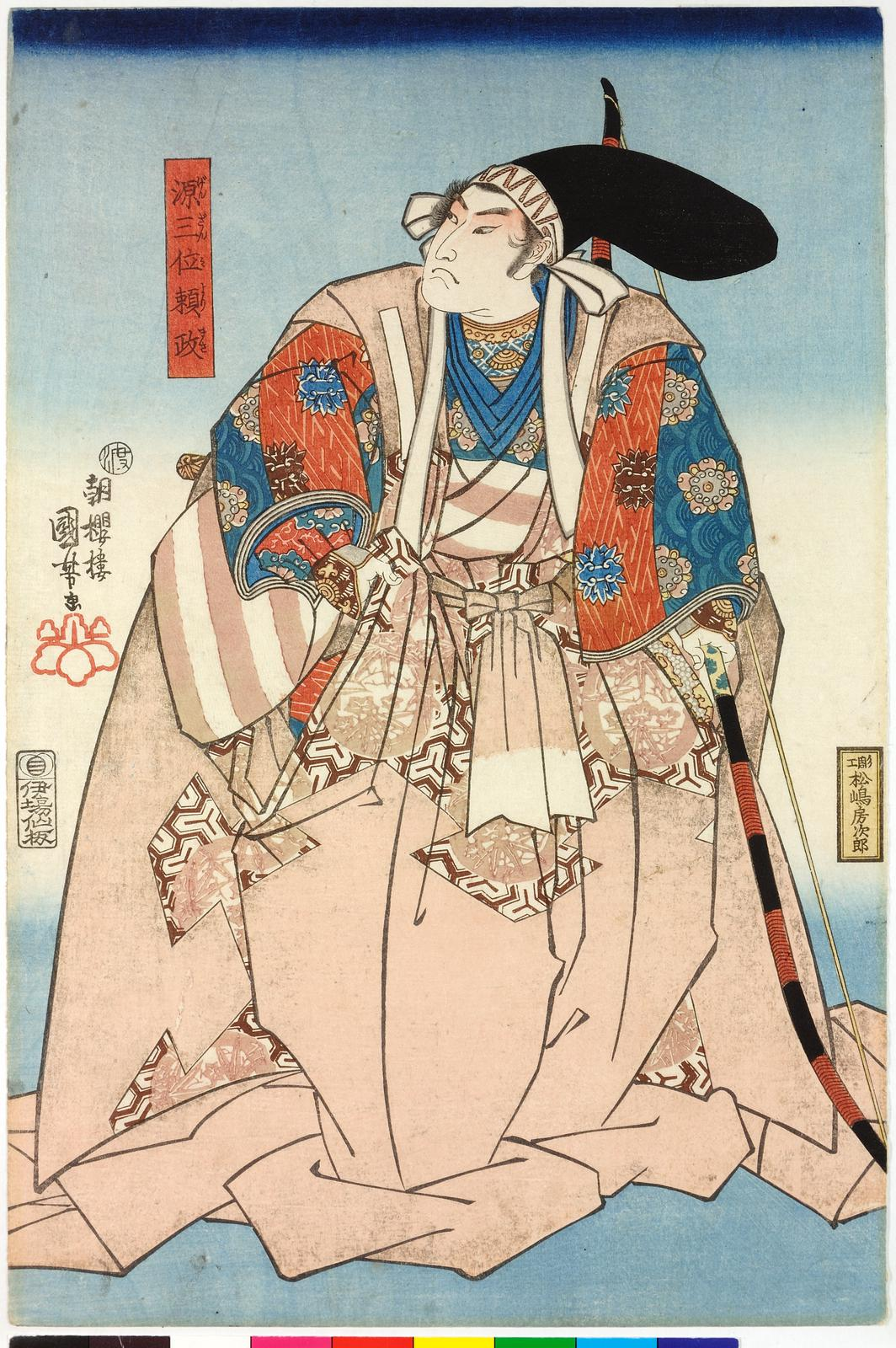
Woodblock triptych print, oban tate-e. The general Minamoto no Yorimasa standing holding his bow (right), his wife Ayame-no-mae seated (centre) in a robe decorated with a Genji motif, and the warrior Ii no Hayata also seated (left), all watching a plover fly across a crescent moon (left).)

In a famous episode in the Taiheiki:

Samidare ni sawabe no makomo mizu koete/izure ayame to hikizo wazurau

The fifth-month rains swamp the water-oats along the shore,
making it hard to tell irises from one another and pull
just one

"So, Yorimasa not only added to his reputation as an archer by shooting down a nue; he also proved himself a distinguished poet by winning with a single poem Lady Ayame, whom he had adored for years and months."

Yorimasa's death poem was:

埋もれ木の/花咲くことも/なかりしに/身のなる果てぞ/悲しかりける
umoregi no/hana saku koto mo/nakarishi ni/mi no naru hate zo/kanashikarikeru

Like a fossil tree
From which we gather no flowers
Sad has been my life
Fated no fruit to produce

== The slaying of the Nue ==
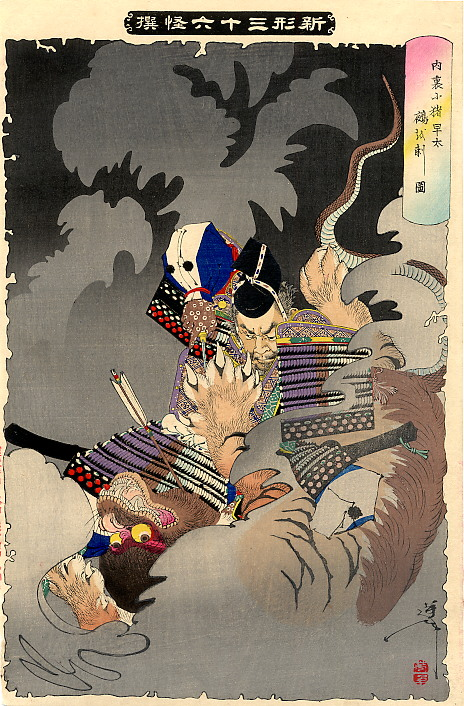
From the Shinkei Sanjūrokkaisen: Ino Hayata and the Nue (猪早太と鵺) by Tsukioka Yoshitoshi

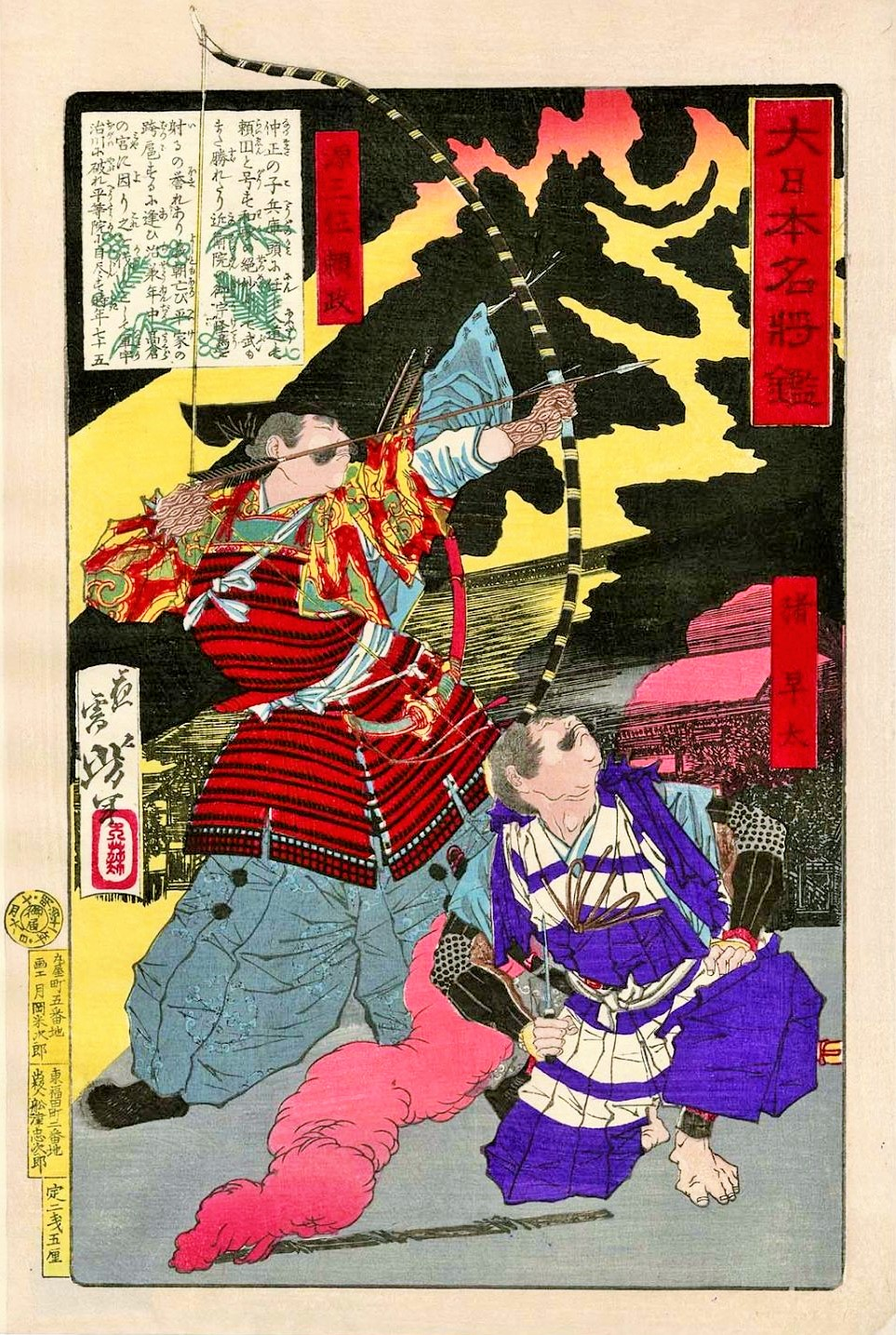
In the Tale of the Heike, it is said that Ino Hayata accompanied Minamoto no Yorimasa on his expedition to exterminate the Nue and put an end to the Nue that Yorimasa had shot down.

The Heike Monogatari and the Settsu Meisho Zue from the Settsu Province, tell the following tale of the killing of the Nue - a type of Japanese Chimera:

In the closing years of the Heian period, at the place where the emperor (Emperor Konoe) lived, the Seiryō-den, there appeared a cloud of black smoke along with an eerie resounding crying voice, making Emperor Nijō quite afraid. Subsequently, the emperor fell into illness, and neither medicine nor prayers had any effect.

A close associate remembered Minamoto no Yoshiie using an arrow to put a stop to the mystery case of some bird's cry, and he gave the order to a master of arrows, Minamoto no Yorimasa, to slay the monster.

One night, Yorimasa went out to slay the monster with his servant Ino Hayata (written as 猪早太 or 井早太), and an arrow made from an arrowhead he had inherited from his ancestor Minamoto no Yorimitsu and the tailfeathers of a mountain bird. An uncanny black smoke started to cover the Seiryō-den. Yorimasa shot his arrow into it, there was a shriek, and a nue fell down around the northern parts of Nijō Castle. Instantly Ino Hayata seized it and finished it off.

In the skies above the imperial court, two or three cries of the common cuckoo could be heard, and it is thus said that peace had returned. After this, the emperor's health instantly recovered, and Yorimasa was given the sword Shishiō as a reward.

== See also ==
- Seiwa Genji
- Hama Yumi
- Nue
