= Hasebe clan =

The Hasebe clan (長谷部氏, Hasebe-shi) was a Japanese samurai kin group in the Sengoku period.

== History ==
The clan claimed descent from Ki no Haseo.

Hasebe Tsunatsura was the last of his clan. His forces were besieged by Uesugi Kenshin at Anamizu Castle in 1576. Tsunatsura retreated to Nano Castle in Noto Province where his forces were defeated and he was killed.

== See also ==
- Hasebe Nobutsura
