= Sōhei =

Buddhist warrior monks In medieval and feudal Japan

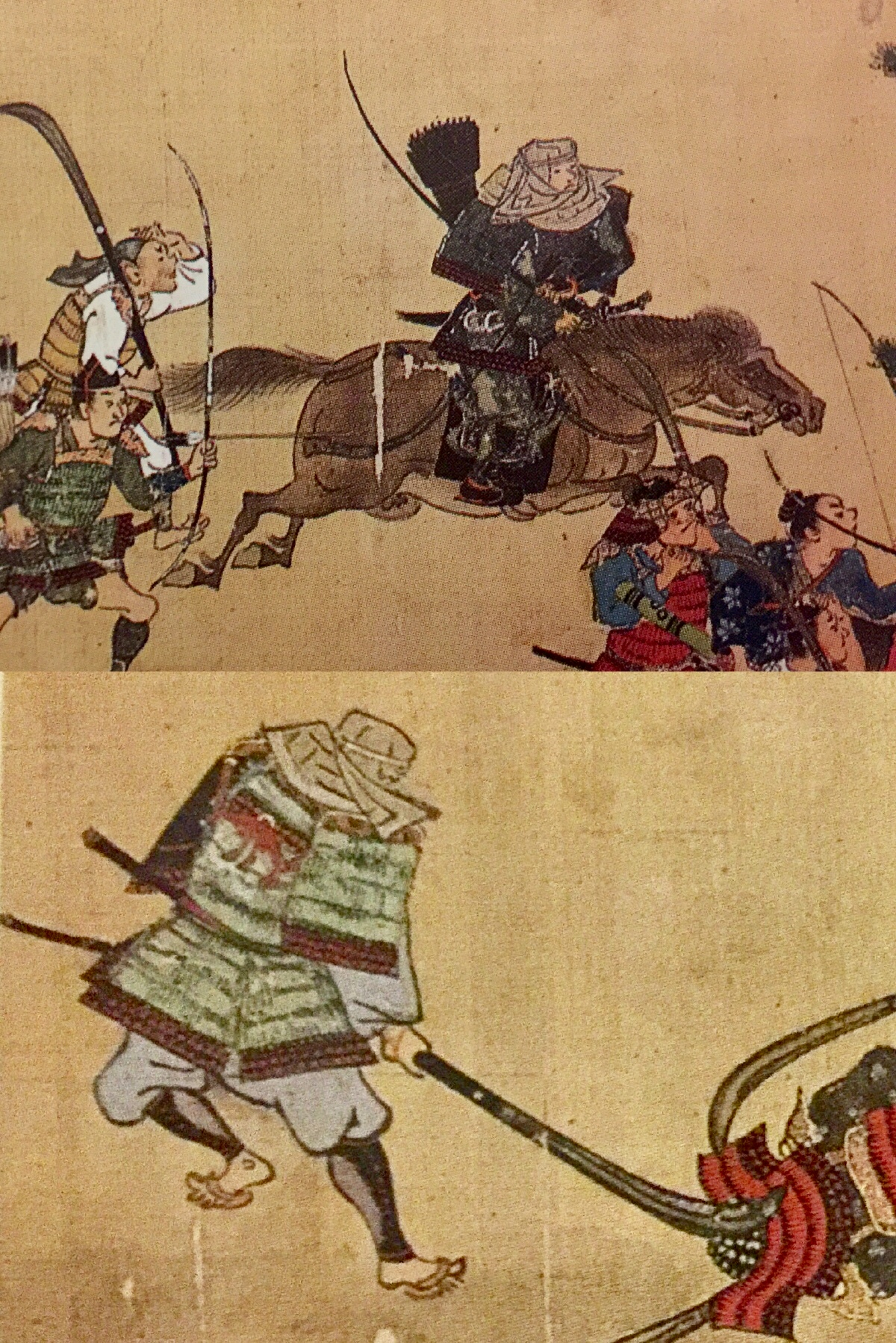
A 14th-century illustration by Takashina Takakane from the Kasuga Gongen Genki E, depicting Sōhei warrior monks

Sōhei (僧兵; "monk soldiers", "warrior monks") were Buddhist warrior monks of both classical and feudal Japan. At certain points in history, they held considerable power, obliging the imperial and military governments to collaborate.

The prominence of the sōhei rose in parallel with the ascendancy of the Tendai school's influence between the 10th and 17th centuries. The warriors protected land and intimidated rival schools of Buddhism, becoming a significant factor in the spread of Buddhism and the development of different schools during the Kamakura period.

The sōhei shared many similarities with the European lay brothers, members of a monastic order who might not have been ordained but were subject to the rest of their rules. Much like the Teutonic Order, the warrior monks of the Holy Roman Empire, and the crusading orders, sōhei did not operate as individuals, or even as members of small, individual temples, but rather as warriors in a large extended brotherhood or monastic order. The home temple of a sōhei monastic order might have had several, if not dozens or a hundred, smaller monasteries, training halls, and subordinate temples connected to it. A famous sōhei monastery is Enryaku-ji on Mount Hiei, just outside Kyoto, while Kōfuku-ji in Nara also fielded a large sōhei army.

== History ==
=== Founding and feuds ===
Warrior monks first appeared during the Heian period, when bitter political feuds began between different temples, different subsects of Buddhism, over imperial appointments to the top temple positions in the sōkan system (zasu or Buddhist abbot). Much of the fighting over the next four centuries was over these sorts of political feuds, and centered around the temples of Kyoto, Nara, and Ōmi, namely the Tōdai-ji, Kōfuku-ji, Enryaku-ji, and Mii-dera, the four largest temples in the country.

The first armed conflict broke out in 949, when 56 monks from Tōdai-ji staged a protest at the residence of a Kyoto official, over an appointment that displeased them. Protests of this sort continued through the 10th century, often breaking out into brawls in which some participants would be killed. In 970, following a dispute between Enryaku-ji and the Yasaka Shrine of Kyoto, the former established the first standing army of warrior monks. It is not entirely clear whether this standing army consisted of monks from Enryaku-ji or was more like a mercenary army, since Ryōgen, the abbot who established this army, also established a code of monastic conduct that prevented monks from leaving Mount Hiei during their twelve-year training, from covering their faces, and from carrying weapons.

Beginning in 981, there were a number of armed conflicts between Enryaku-ji and Mii-dera, each the head temple of a different sub-sect of Tendai. These disputes were, as before, over political appointments and dishonorable etiquette. More often than not, these were cases of members of one faction being chosen as the abbot of the other faction's temple, and the monks would protest. This continued, on and off, once stopping for as long as 40 years, through the 11th and into the 12th century. The armies became larger and the violence increased, until in 1121 and 1141 Mii-dera was burned to the ground by monks from Enryaku-ji. Other temples became embroiled in the conflicts as well, and Enryaku-ji and Mii-dera united against Kōfuku-ji, and, another time, against Kiyomizu-dera.

=== Genpei War ===
At the end of the 12th century, Japan was plunged into the Genpei War and, while the feuds between the temples did not end, they became subsumed by larger events. The warring Minamoto and Taira clans both tried to obtain the aid of the warrior monks of Nara and Kyoto, adding the temples' forces to the clans' already mighty armies of samurai.

Taira no Kiyomori sent generous gifts of rice and silk to Enryaku-ji, ensuring they would not help his enemies, the Minamoto, who had allied themselves with the monks of Mii-dera. In the Battle of Uji in 1180, one of the more famous battles in which sōhei participated, the monks of Mii-dera, along with a force of Minamoto samurai, tried to defend the bridge over the Uji River, and the Byōdō-in, a temple behind it, from an attacking Taira force. The monks pulled up the planks of the bridge to impair the ability of the horse mounted samurai to cross. The warrior monks stood their ground with bow and arrow, naginata, sword and dagger, but were ultimately defeated. Following his victory, Taira no Kiyomori ordered that revenge be taken upon the monks that opposed him. Mii-dera was burned to the ground once again, as were many of the temples of Nara. Only the Enryaku-ji escaped unscathed.

Three years later, when Minamoto no Yoshinaka betrayed his clan by storming into Kyoto, setting the Hōjōji Palace aflame and kidnapping Emperor Go-Shirakawa, he was opposed by many of the monks of Kyoto, including those from Mount Hiei.

=== 13th–14th centuries and the rise of Zen ===
Following the Genpei War, the monasteries, to a large extent, turned their attention to rebuilding, first physically, and then politically. Their political influence grew stronger through peaceful means, and the warrior monks played only very minor roles in the wars of the 13th and 14th centuries. Violent conflict between the temples still occurred on occasion, once again over political and spiritual appointments, and related matters.

During the wars of the Nanboku-chō period, Mount Hiei took in the rebel Emperor Go-Daigo, and offered him sanctuary. Emperor Go-Daigo, along with his son, and the help of the sōhei of Mount Hiei, launched a brief rebellion against the Kamakura shogunate. The Ashikaga shogunate took power shortly afterwards, and supported Zen over the other Buddhist sects, drawing the ire of the warrior monks. Over the course of the 1340s–1360s a number of conflicts erupted between the Tendai sect temples, and those of Zen, especially Nanzen-ji.

=== Sengoku-jidai and the rise of the Ikkō-Ikki ===
The Ōnin War, starting in 1467, was the prelude to over a century of civil war in Japan, and the stimulus for a reorganization of the warrior monks. Unlike the Jōkyū War and Mongol invasions of the 13th century, the Ōnin War was fought primarily in Kyoto, and thus the warrior monks could no longer remain non-violent and neutral.

In addition, a new breed of warrior monks was forming in the countryside. Where the monks of Mount Hiei had subscribed to the teachings of the Tendai sect, these new groups, calling themselves Ikkō-ikki, followed the dictates of the Jōdo Shinshū sect of beliefs. They were essentially coalitions of religious fundamentalist priests, farmers, and families, who were willing to literally fight for their beliefs. Ikkō-ikki translates to something like "devoted league", but also had the connotation of "single-minded riots". In 1488, their leader Rennyo, incited an uprising against samurai rule, and secured Kaga Province for the Ikkō-ikki. From there they spread, establishing themselves in Nagashima, Ishiyama Hongan-ji, and Mikawa Province. Their growing power base was eventually to attract the attention of warlords like Oda Nobunaga and Tokugawa Ieyasu, who recognized their opposition to samurai rule, their determination, their strength, and their numbers.

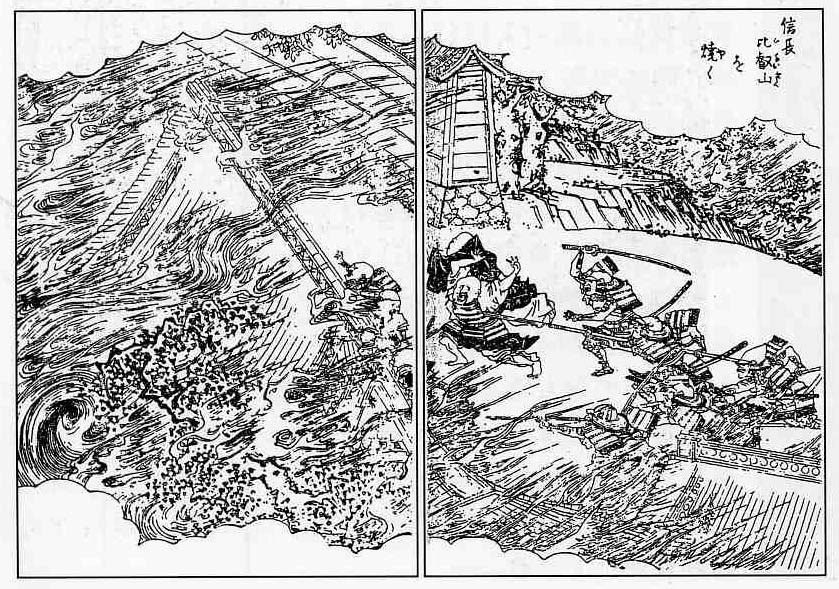
Oda Nobunaga forces setting fire to Enryaku-ji and massacring the monks in the 1571 Siege of Mount Hiei (depiction in the Ehon taikōki)

Tokugawa Ieyasu attacked the Ikkō-ikki of Mikawa in 1564, in the Battle of Azukizaka, and failed to defeat the Ikkō-ikki, but returned shortly afterwards with a contingent of warrior monks from his own religious sect, Jōdo-shū, and, after defeating the Ikkō adherents in battle, burned all their temples to the ground. As Oda Nobunaga rose to power at the end of the 1560s, the monks of Enryaku-ji regained their military might, and fought a number of skirmishes in the streets of Kyoto against a new rival sect, Nichiren Buddhism. They eventually burned all of Kyoto's Nichiren temples to the ground, and then sought allies among the local lords (daimyō). Unfortunately for them, the Azai and Asakura clans they allied with were enemies of Oda Nobunaga. Beginning on 29 September 1571, Nobunaga's army of 30,000 led the Siege of Mount Hiei, destroying Enryaku-ji and massacring thousands. Though it was rebuilt, the standing army of warrior monks would never be reconstituted after this devastation.

Nobunaga then moved on to fighting the Ikkō-ikki in their fortresses of Nagashima and Ishiyama Hongan-ji (see Sieges of Nagashima, Ishiyama Hongan-ji War). In the summer of 1574, with the help of former pirate Kuki Yoshitaka, Nobunaga essentially blockaded the Ikkō fortresses and starved them into submission. The 20,000 inhabitants of the fortress went up in flames along with their home. Two years later, Nobunaga returned to the Ishiyama Hongan-ji, which he had failed to take earlier. At the two Battles of Kizugawaguchi, Nobunaga defeated his enemies, the Mōri clan, who had naval control over the area. The Ikkō were finally forced to surrender in 1580.

In the 1580s and 1590s, various factions of warrior monks sided with either Tokugawa Ieyasu or his rival Toyotomi Hideyoshi, fighting in a number of battles and skirmishes. When Tokugawa Ieyasu finally defeated the last of his enemies and took control of the country in 1603, the time of the warrior monks finally came to an end.

== Weapons and dress ==
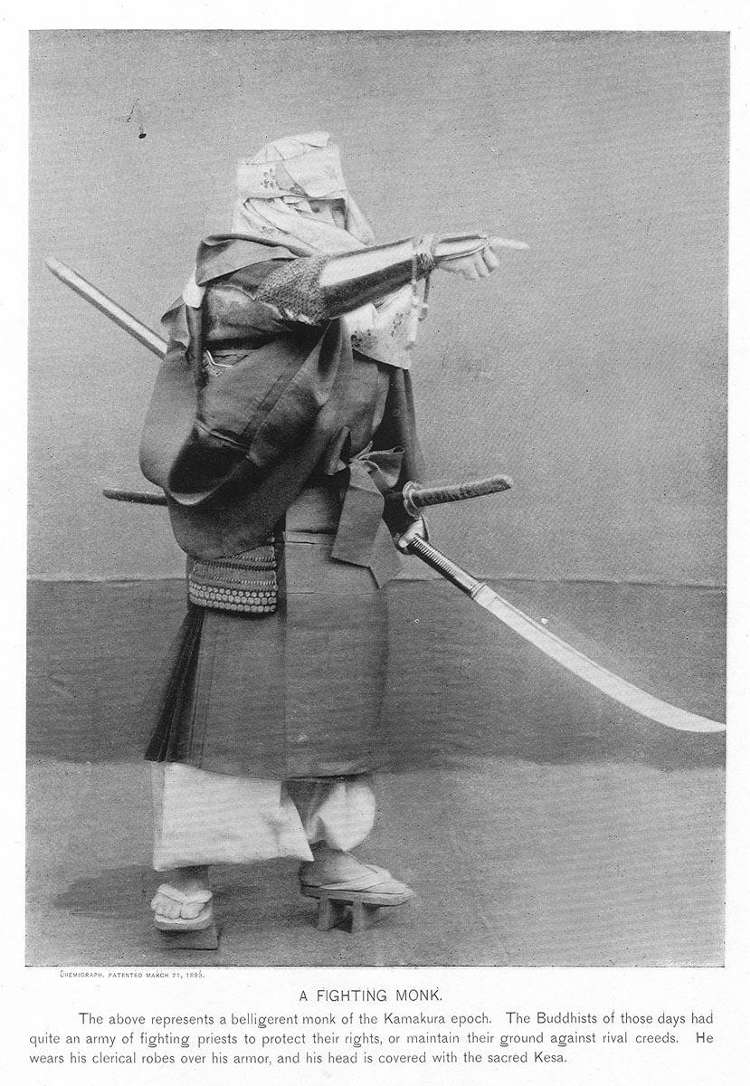
Sōhei weapons and dress during the Kamakura period

Sōhei were quite varied in their armament. The naginata is the weapon most often associated with them, though in legend as well as history many warrior monks are known to have been proficient with everything from yari, yumi, tachi, and tantō. Many fought on horseback, and many with the ō-yoroi armor of the samurai.

Warrior monks, like most other Buddhist monks of related sects, wore a series of kimono-like robes in layers, one over the other, usually white underneath, and tan or saffron yellow on top; this style has changed very little since the introduction of Buddhism to Japan in the 7th century. Footwear traditionally consisted of tabi socks and geta (wooden clogs), or waraji (straw sandals). Warrior monks would often fold and tie the white headcowl to cover more of their head, or would substitute a hachimaki headband. Finally, many warrior monks would wear some form of samurai armor.

The sōhei employed a variety of weapons. The obi, or belt, of the kimono would often be supplemented with a heavier sash, so a sword could be slung from it. The long tachi was probably the most common sword, though many monks may have carried tantō as well. Many monks were also accomplished archers, and used bamboo-and-rattan bows, called daikyū, with bamboo arrows. The most traditional weapon of the monk, however, was the naginata, a weapon much like the Chinese guandao or podao, European glaive or the Russian sovnya. The sōhei were also trained to use the heavy kanabō, large clubs of studded wood or iron.

The Ikkō-ikki monks of the 16th century, due largely to their origins as countryside mobs, were far more varied in their armor and armament. Many wore the more traditional monk robes, with varying degrees and types of armor. Many wore various sorts of helmets, while many others opted for the straw hat and cloak of a peasant. Naginata remained very common, along with a variety of swords and daggers, and a limited number of arquebuses (with the Saika Ikki being a notable exception, as they are mainly composed of musketeers and gunsmiths as per Suzuki Magoichi's standard of having an all-musketeer army). Finally, while not truly armor nor armament, a very common item wielded by the mobs of Ikkō-ikki monk warriors was a banner with a Buddhist slogan written upon it. One of the more common slogans was the nenbutsu, "Hail Amitābha!" (Namu Amida Butsu).

== See also ==
- Shaolin Monk
- Yamabushi
- Benkei
- Gochi-in no Tajima
- Hōzōin In'ei
- Ichirai
- Tsutsui Jōmyō Meishū
