= Gochi-in no Tajima =

12th-century legendary sōhei (Japanese Buddhist warrior monk)

Gochi-in no Tajima (五智院 但馬), called Tajima the arrow-cutter, was a sōhei (warrior monk) from Mii-dera who fought alongside the Minamoto clan forces, and many of his fellow Mii-dera monks at the Battle of Uji in 1180.

The bridge over the Yodo River was torn up by Tajima's fellow sōhei, but the attacking Taira clan forces were still shooting arrows, and were still threatening to cross the river. Tajima is said to have stood upon the bridge and, spinning his naginata, deflected many if not most of the arrows that came his way.

According to The Tale of the Heike,

Then Gochi-in Tajima, throwing away the sheath of his long naginata, strode forth alone on to the bridge, whereupon the Heike straightaway shot at him fast and furious. Tajima, not at all perturbed, ducking to avoid the higher ones and leaping up over those that flew low, cut through those that flew straight with his whirring naginata, so that even the enemy looked on in admiration. Thus it was that he was dubbed "Tajima the arrow-cutter".

== Citations ==
=== References ===
- Turnbull, Stephen (2012). Japanese Warrior Monks AD 949–1603. Bloomsbury Publishing. ISBN 978-1-78200-010-5.
- "Heike Monogatari". etext.lib.virginia.edu. Archived from the original on 2008-05-01.
