= Battle of Uji (1180) =

Opening battle of the Genpei War

First Battle of Uji
- Part of the Genpei War
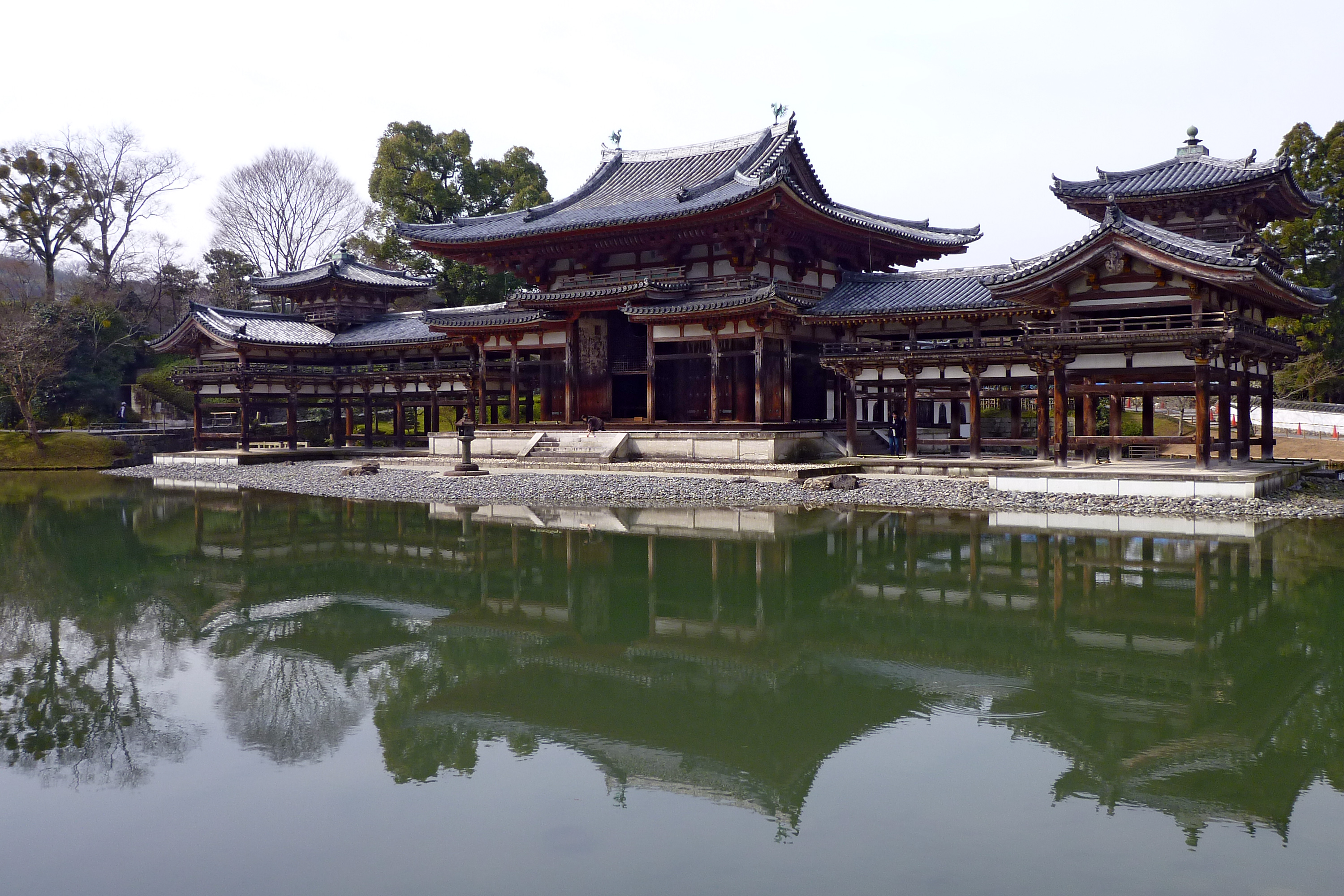
- The Phoenix Hall of the Byōdō-in, in front of which the battle took place
Date	20 June 1180
Location	Uji, just outside Kyoto 34°53′4″N 135°47′59″E
Result	Taira victory

Belligerents
Minamoto clan	Taira clan

Commanders and leaders
(Minamoto clan) Minamoto no Yorimasa †; (Imperial House of Japan) Prince Mochihito †	(Taira clan) Taira no Tomomori; (Taira clan) Taira no Shigehira

Strength
1,500 (Heike Monogatari)	28,000 (Heike Monogatari)

The First Battle of Uji (宇治平等院の戦い, Uji Byōdō-in no Tatakai), alternatively known as "Mochihitos Raising of an Army" in Japan is a battle which took place on June 20, 1180, following Prince Mochihito and Minamoto no Yorimasa's plan to raise an army to overthrow the Taira clan and the issuing of an edict urging the Minamoto clan, major temples, and shrines in the country to revolt.

Due to lack of preparation, the plan was discovered by the Taira, and Prince Mochihito and Yorimasa were defeated, dying at the battle. However, this triggered multiple anti-Taira forces to raise their armies. The battle is famous for having begun the Genpei War.

== Background ==
Prince Mochihito, having been passed over twice in the succession of the Imperial Throne and believing Taira no Kiyomori was causing suffering in the country, coordinated with Minamoto no Yorimasa, who believed Mochihito to be the legitimate heir to the successors, and urged him to rebel. Minamoto no Yorimasa was an aristocrat, who dominated the Imperial Court in Kyoto. He was the most important Minamoto figure on the side of the Taira clan during the Heiji and Hōgen rebellion, leading to the Minamoto clan being banished and the Taira's domination over Japanese politics. Due to his connections to Kiyomori, who was the de facto leader of Japan at this point (see Daijō-daijin), he became a high-ranking official, even though he preferred staying out of politics and being in positions that did not require taking sides. By 1179, however, he had changed his views on the Taira and began secretly hoping on the downfall of the Taira.

While at first Mochihito was against the idea of rebelling, after Yorimasa continued urging him, he eventually consented to issue an order. On May 1180, Minamoto Yoshimori was appointed Kurōdo (someone who takes care of the emperor's imperial documents), and changed his name to Minamoto no Yukiie. On the 5th of May he set out with Mochihito's Royal Order, which went as follows:

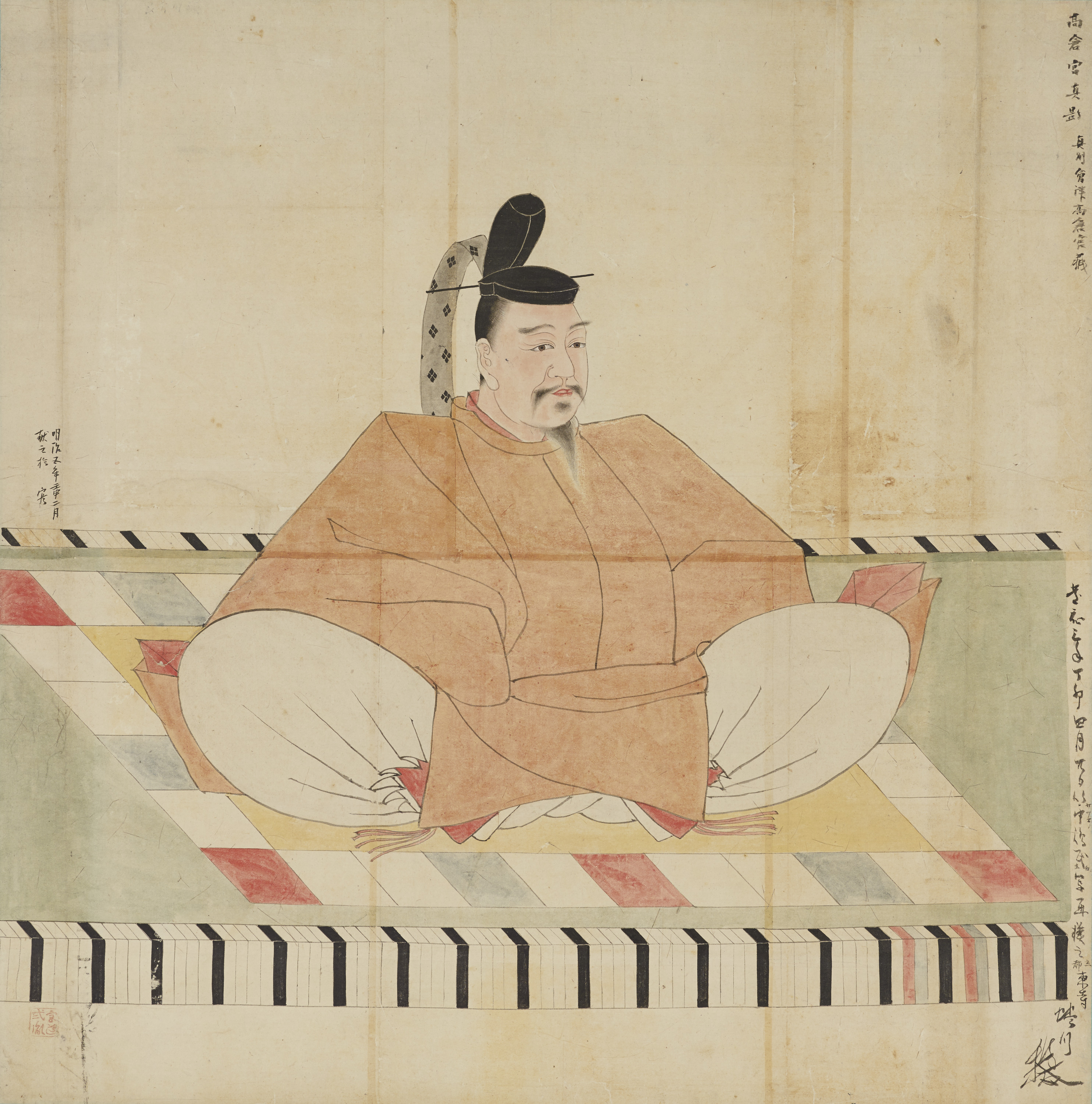
Portrait of Mochihito.

'The pronouncement of His Excellency the Prince declares that Kiyomori, Munemori and others, using the prestige of their office and their influence, have invited rebellion and have overthrown the nation. They have caused the officials and the people to suffer, seizing and plundering the five inner provinces and the seven circuits. They have confined the Ex-sovereign, exiled public officials, and inflicted death and banishment, drowning and imprisonment. They have robbed property and seized lands, usurped and bestowed offices.... They have despoiled the graves of Princes and cut off the head of one, defied the Emperor and destroyed Buddhist law in a manner unprecedented in history. This being so, let those of the Minamoto, the Fujiwara and the brave now living in the provinces of the three circuits now add their efforts to the cause. If there be those who are not of like mind they shall be regarded as partisans of Kiyomori and they shall suffer pain of death, exile or imprisonment. If there be those who perform meritoriously, despatch missions to me and inform me of their names and deeds, I shall, without fail, following my enthronement, bestow rewards upon them according to their wishes. Proclaim this message in all the provinces and carry out the terms of this pronouncement. 5 May 1180.'

After Yukiie set out, Tanzō of Kumano, who was under obligation of the Taira clan, had found out about Mochihito's Royal Order and that Yukiie was carrying it, although the way he found out is unknown. He then set out with around 1,000 men against Yukiie, who had 1,500. The battle would go on for 3 days until most of Tanzō's retainers were killed and he himself was injured.

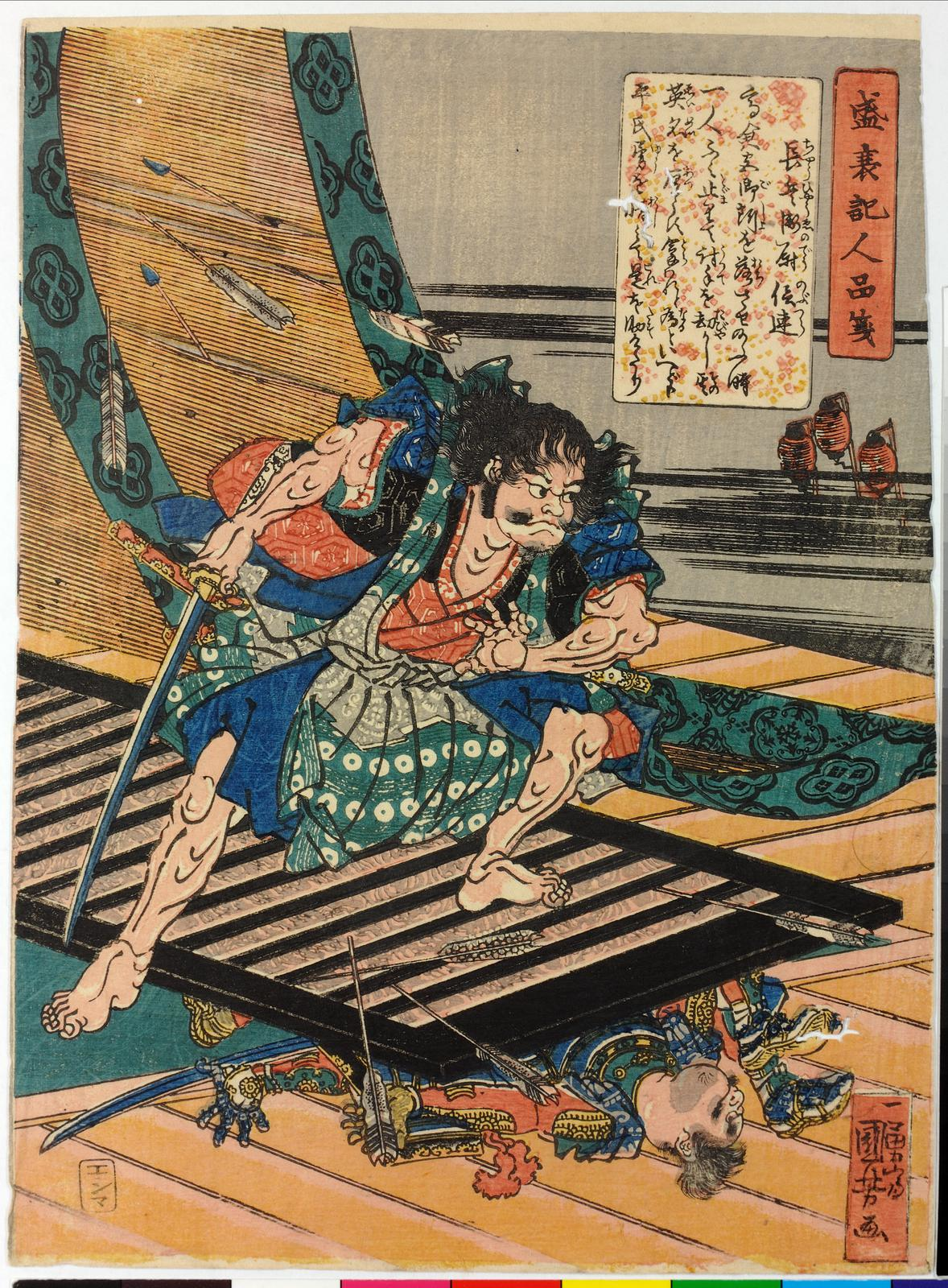
Nobutsura fighting the Taira army at Mochihito's temple

After the battle, Tanzō sent a courier to Kyoto, notifying them of the upcoming Rebellion. Once Kiyomori heard of this, he immediately ordered Mochihito be arrested and banished to Tosa Province on Shikoku. At first, no one suspected Minamoto no Yorimasa to be behind the plot, as one of entrusted samurais that were to carry out the order of arrest was one of Yorimasa's gotten news of the order, and was told to flee to Mii-dera, one of the temples which opposed Kiyomori. He was told by his samurai that it would be easier to escape in women's attire, so he let his hair loose, put on female clothing, and wore a wide straw hat, similar to one a townswomen would wear.

Soon, the Taira forces had made it to Mochihito's palace, where there was a guard called Hasebe Nobutsura who was left behind while Mochihito fled. He was questioned by the Taira forces on the whereabouts of Mochihito, to which he responded that he had gone to a local shrine. The Taira forces, doubting this, ordered the palace be searched. Nobutsura, however, drew his sword (which had only been a ceremonial one) in response, beginning a battle in which he stood alone against 300 Taira men. He had wounded at least 56 of the Taira due to his knowledge of the palace. Since his sword was only ceremonial, it soon broke, causing him to be captured and examined in which he did not give the whereabouts of Mochihito away, and was banished to Hōki Province.

== Prelude ==
On the following morning, Mochihito arrived at Mii-dera, where the monks were extremely grateful for the prince's presence. On the evening of the next day, Yorimasa also arrived with his sons Nakatsuna, Kanetsuna, and about 300 men. Soon too the Watanabe clan assembled at the temple of Mii-dera, as they were vassals of the Minamoto. One of the Watanabe clan members (Watanabe Kiou) had been late, and was caught by Taira no Munemori, who tried convincing him to serve the Taira. Kiou tricked him into giving him a horse to go to Mii-dera to ambush the Minamoto, however he used it to meet up with the Minamoto forces and fight for them. Munemori was greatly angered by this, and requested he be taken alive and that Munemori be able to "saw" his head off.

Mii-dera, knowing they could not alone defend against a Taira force, sent a letter to Nara and Enryaku-ji for assistance, the one sent to Nara went as following:

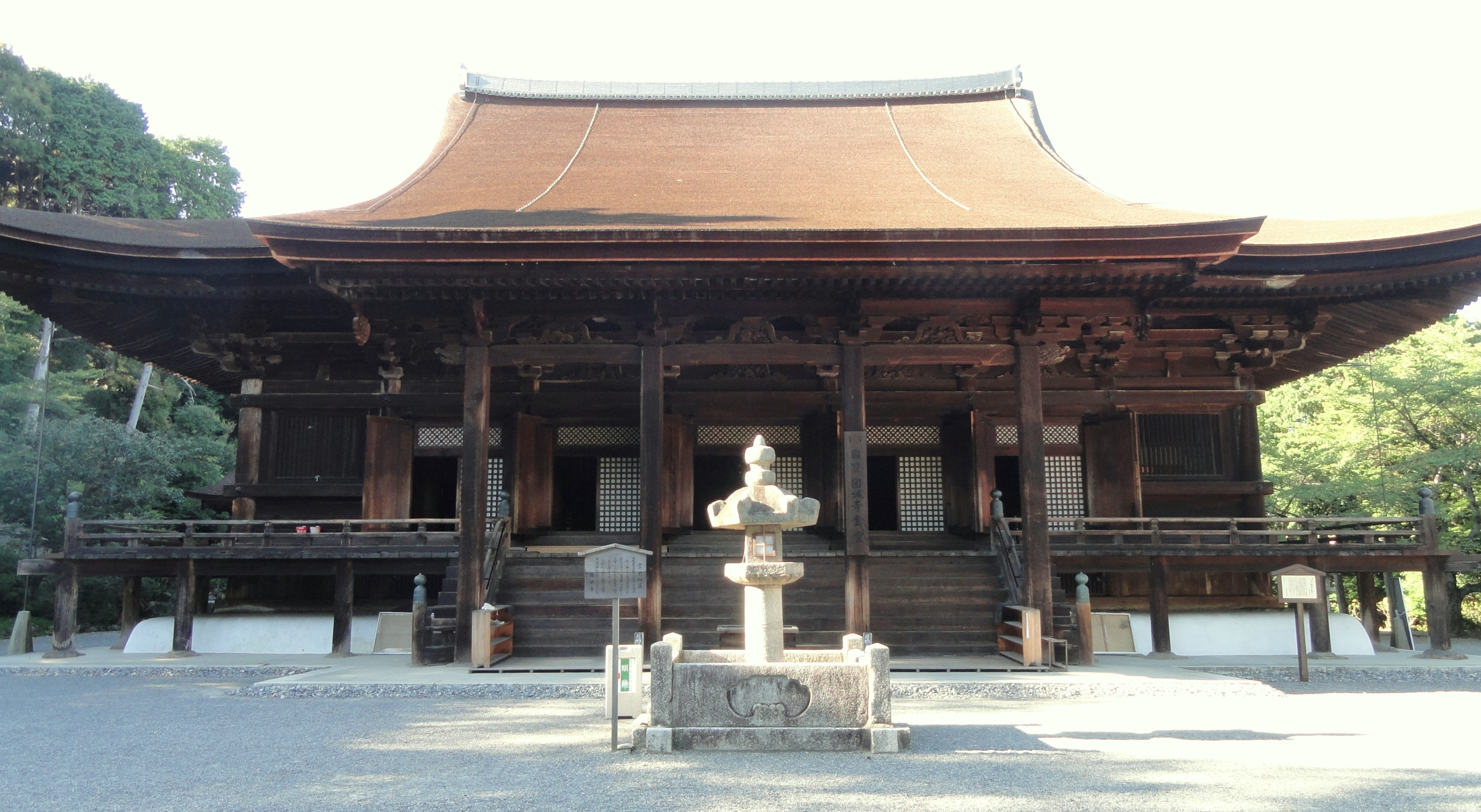
Image of the Mii-dera temple.

"A petition from Onjoji (Mii-dera) to Kōfuku-ji (A temple in Nara) to beg assistance that this monastery may not be destroyed. Know that the supreme excellence of Buddhism is to uphold the Monarchy; and the duration of the Throne therefore depends on the Law of Buddha. Now the Nyudo (someone who enteres priesthood), the former Daijō-daijin (Chancellor), Taira-no-Kiyomori Ko, whose priestly name is Jokai, does his will with the authority of the country and turns the government upside down, so that there is everywhere resentment and lamentation. And on the evening of the fifteenth day of this month the second son of the Ho-o (Emperor Takakura) hurriedly fled to our monastery to escape persecution, and though they have demanded repeatedly that we give him up, our priests unanimously refuse to do so, Therefore this Lay priest is collecting an army to enter our monastery, wishing to destroy at one time both Buddhism and the Monarchy. In ancient times in China, when the Emperor Bu-so attempted to destroy Buddhism by force of arms, the monks of Joryusen joined battle and repulsed him; if they thus upheld their rights against the monarch, how much more shall we not chastise this great rebel (Kiyomori), this transgressor of the first of the Eight Disobediences (Rebellion). Nara was the place where in unprecedented fashion the guiltless Kampaku was banished. If we do not act now, at what time shall we able to remove this reproach? Thus we pray you to lend us aid lest Buddhism be destroyed, and also that this evil revolt against the Monarchy may be put away. If we are of one mind we shall attain our object. Given at a council of the Chief Priests; eighteenth. day of the fifth month (12th of June) of the fourth year of Jisho (1180)."

A similar letter was then also sent to Enryakuji.

The Enryakuji monks read the letter, however didn't give any response, as they had been bribed by Kiyomori so they stay by his side. Nara temple however, did reply on the 15th of June, accepting Mii-deras call to arms, telling them that they "will await your sign to advance".

After this, the Mii-dera monks began fortifying the temple, and held another council, suggesting that they do a night attack on Rokuhara, which was an important base for the Taira and where the Ise Taira, a major branch of the Taira, resided in. The idea was to split up their forces into 2, using old veterans to attack the back gate and the younger soldiers to attack the front gate of. While this was being discussed, a monk, along with 10 others who lived with him, and who had done priestly services for the Taira, suggested it was a bad idea as it could cause reputational damage to the temple and anger other temples while also calling the plan unrealistic. He continued to argue with the other monks, greatly delaying an expedition. Soon, one of the monks burst into the council and stated

"There is a saying that a man will have pity on a distressed bird that takes refuge in his bosom. I don't know about the rest, but as for me and my followers we go down to attack Rokuhara tonight and die there!"

Another monk agreed with him, and so the army set off with around 1,500 men to Rokuhara. However soon an issue was faced, as when Mochihito had first entered the temple, Mii-dera had made a rampart, a moat, set up palisades, and thrown obstacles across the road, so the moat had to be bridged and the obstacles removed. It had taken the whole evening for it to be able to be crossed and the road be cleared. Noticing it was already morning, the attack was called off, thinking it would be too risky to fight the Taira in broad daylight. Fault was put upon the Monk who had delayed the expedition by arguing, and he along with his followers were violently harassed and attacked by the other Monks. He eventually fled towards Rokuhara, where he told the story to the Taira, who were not concerned by it, as they had 10,000 men assembled at Rokuhara.

Then the Prince, seeing that Enryakuji had turned against them, that Nara had not yet sent any men, and that Mii-dera alone could not defend itself, decided on the 17th of June to leave the temple and headed for Nara. While the older monks stayed behind at the temple, the younger monks along with the Watanabe clan and Yorimasa went with Mochihito, meaning the army had around 1,500 men.

They marched down to Uji, crossing the Uji River and tearing up the planks of the bridge behind them to prevent the Taira from following. As Mochihito hadn't gotten any sleep the night before, they entered the Byōdō-in temple to get some rest.

== Battle ==
As soon as the Taira at Rokuhara learnt of Mochihito's escape to Nara, they immediately sent an army of roughly 28,000 men in pursuit. Soon the army arrived at the Uji river, and suspecting the enemy forces to be at Uji, they soon began their battle cry. The vanguard alerted the rest of the army that the bridge had been destroyed by the Mochihito forces, the rearguard however, ignored this, and called for an advance into the river. This led many (around 200 according to the Heike Monogatari) horsemen falling into the river and dying.

The two sides stood on opposite ends of the bridge, and they began an archery battle. The warrior monks were said to be very good archers, being able to shoot so powerfully that the arrow's shaft pierced the wooden shields of the Taira. Three warrior monks in particular are named in the Heike Monogatari:

Gochi-in no Tajima, who is said to have strode alone on the bridge, dodging arrows and using his Naginata to cut through those that flew straight at him (leading to him being named "the arrow cutter").

Tsutsui Jōmyō Meishū, who was said to have loosed off "his twenty-four arrows like lightning flashes" having slewn 12 Taira samurai and injured another 11; once his quiver only contained one more arrow, he threw his bow and quiver away, and using a naginata, tachi and dagger slew at least another 15. It is said that once the battle was over, he counted 63 arrows sticking out of his armor, which is not unlikely considering the structure and material composition of samurai armor

Ichirai Hōshi, who was behind Jōmyō and frustrated over him blocking the narrow bridge, meaning he could not fight alongside him. Ichirai then grabbed him by his neckpiece, vaulting over him, after which he fought bravely until he ultimately fell. Jōmyō, seeing Ichirai be killed, then retired from the battle to Byodo-in and went to Nara.

The fighting across the broken bridge continued until sunset, until it was littered with dead bodies. Some fought across to the other side of the bridge and returned with the spoils of who they slew. Some, after being wounded, cut themselves open and jumped into the river. A retainer of the Taira force, seeing this, said to the commanders "the battle on the bridge is very fierce; we ought to ford the river, but after the rains of this month, neither man nor horse can live in the stream" and suggested they take a large detour to cross to the other side. Ashikaga Tadatsuna, who led a contingent of 300 samurai, disagreed with this plan, stating that if they did not confront the enemy force here, the Prince would escape to Nara, and suggested trying to ford this river instead. And so, he and his force of samurai, shouting the Ashikaga warcry, crossed the river without losing a single man. Tadatsuna was the first warrior on the frontline and following a custom of the period is said to have proclaimed his name and lineage before charging his enemies. According to the Azuma Kagami, the 18-year-old Tadatsuna is supposedly remembered as having had the strength of one hundred men, a voice that echoed over 10 li (5 km), and teeth of 1 sun (3.03 cm) long. Kagami further stated that "there will be no warrior in future ages like this Tadatsuna."

Taira no Tomomori, the commander, seeing this, sent the entire Taira force to ford the river and caught up with the Minamoto. Soon the Taira force had made it to the gates of the Byodo-in, and Mochihito wanted to try and escape. Yorimasa tried to help the Prince get away, but was struck with an arrow in the right elbow. His younger son, Kanetsuna was holding off a group of Taira soldiers who had wanted Yorimasa's head, but he was hit by an arrow. Nakatsuna, Yorimasa's older son, was also terribly injured. They both held off the Taira long enough for Yorimasa, who was at the age of around 73, to commit seppuku. Kanetsuna was then killed by the group of Taira soldiers. Soon after Nakatsuna, being mortally wounded, also committed seppuku. On the back of Yorimasa's war fan he wrote a farewell-poem, which read:

Like a fossil tree from which we gather no fruits,
Sad has been my life, fated no fruit to produce.

It is said that "Yorimasa committed seppuku in a way that set the standard for generations to come."

With the main Minamoto leaders gone, the Taira quickly took control of the Temple. The Taira then went in pursuit of Prince Mochihito, who was trying to escape. With around 400-500 men they set off and found him at the Kōmyōzen torii and in a hail of arrows was thrown off his horse, and was afterwards decaptitated. Shortly after the battle, 7,000 Monks from Nara were on their way to the battleground, but had received news the battle had already ended in a defeat, and they all went back home.

== Bibliography ==
- Turnbull, Stephen (2003). Japanese Warrior Monks AD 949–1603. Oxford: Osprey Publishing. ISBN 978-1-84176-573-0.
