= Byōdō-in =

Buddhist temple in Kyoto Prefecture, Japan

- 平等院
- Phoenix Hall, a National Treasure

Religion
- Affiliation: Independent
- Deity: Amida Nyorai (Amitābha)

Location
- Location: 116 Ujirenge, Uji, Kyoto Prefecture
- Country: Japan
- Interactive map of Byōdō-in
- Coordinates: 34°53′22″N 135°48′28″E

Architecture
- Founder: Fujiwara no Yorimichi
- Completed: 1052

Website
- www.byodoin.or.jp

Byōdō-in (平等院, "Temple of Equality") is a Buddhist temple in the city of Uji in Kyoto Prefecture, Japan, built in the late Heian period. It is jointly a temple of the Jōdo-shū (Pure Land) and Tendai-shū (Heavenly Level) sects.

== History ==
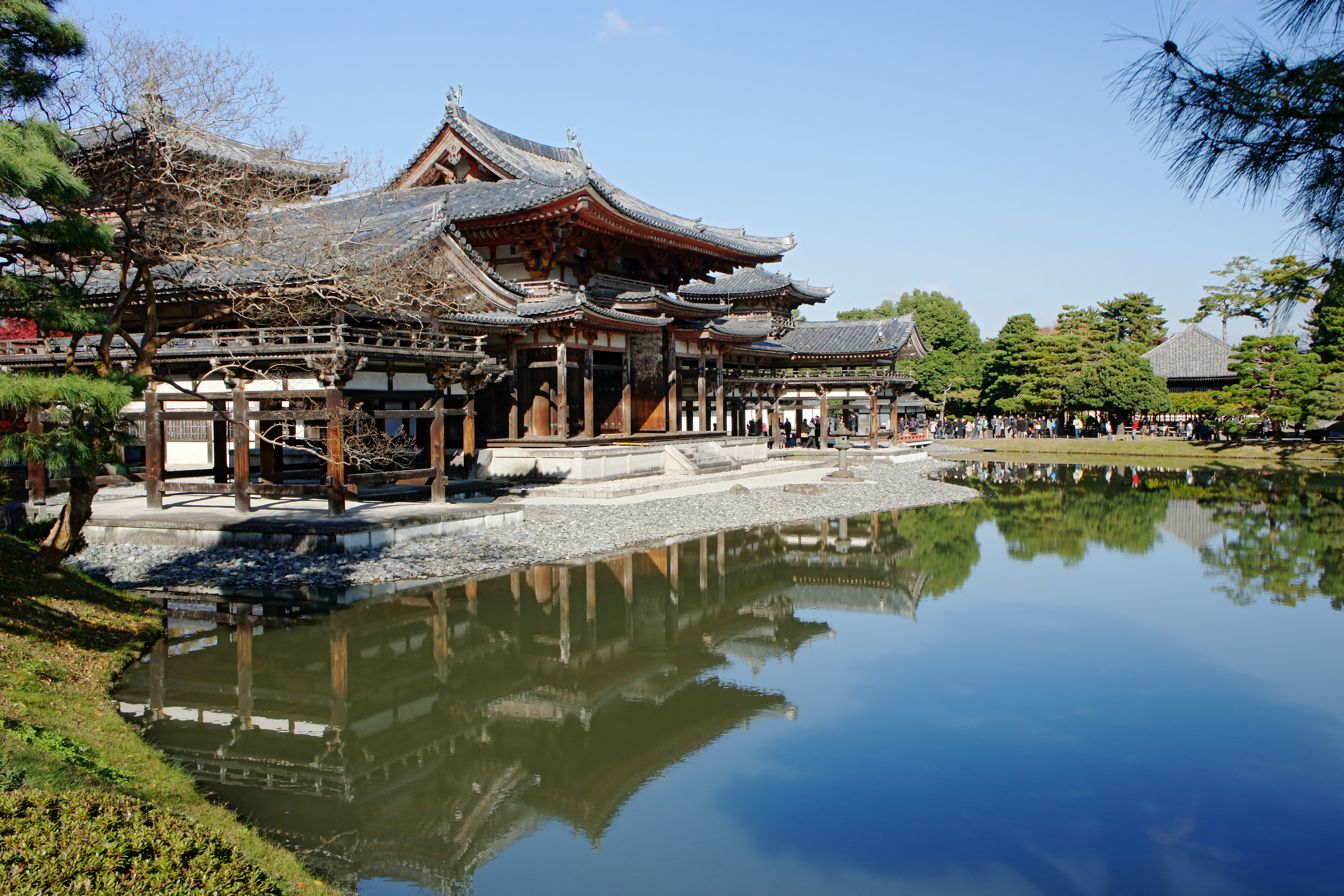
Jōdo-shiki garden with Phoenix Hall and Aji-ike Pond

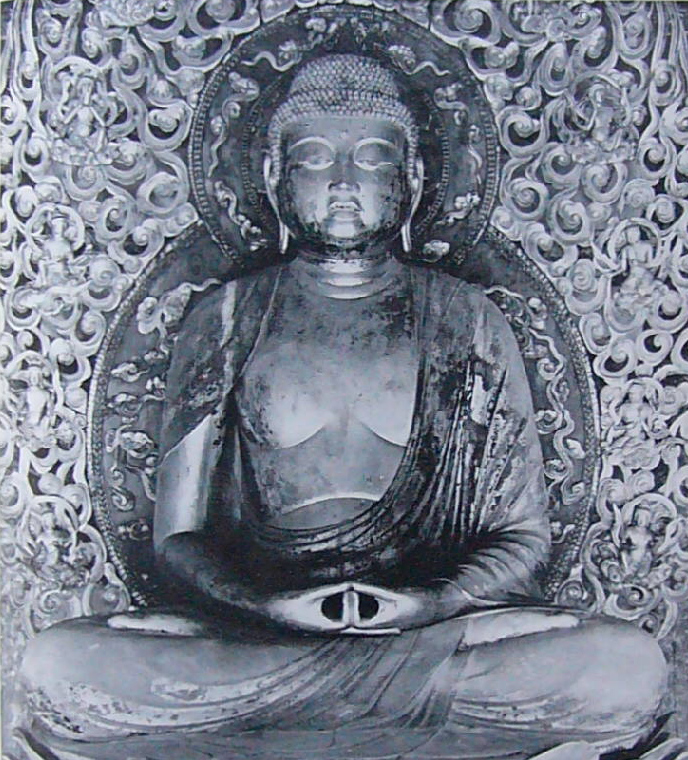
Amitābha in Byōdō-in created by Jōchō. 1053.

This temple was originally built in 998 in the Heian period as a rural villa of high-ranking courtier Minamoto no Shigenobu, Minister of the Left. After he died, one of the most powerful members of the Fujiwara clan, Fujiwara no Michinaga, purchased the property from the courtier's widow. The villa was made into a Buddhist temple by his son Fujiwara no Yorimichi in 1052. As one of the World Heritage sites of Japan, the Byodoin Temple buildings and Buddha statues have a long history of about 1000 years. In East Asian Buddhism, there are the Three Ages of Buddhism, which are three divisions of time following Buddha's passing. The Mappō, which is also translated as the Decline of the Dharma, is the degenerate Third Age of Buddhism, also known as the Latter Day of the Law. It was widely believed that the year 1052 marked the first year of the beginning of the end of the world. This theory captured the heart of many aristocrats and monks, and as a result, people became more devout in Buddhism and believed in the ideology of Buddhist Pure Land. In the following year, Amida-dō Hall (Phoenix Hall) was completed, whose interior houses the 2.4-meter-tall Amida Buddha statue created by Jōchō, who is claimed to have been the best Buddhist sculptor in the Heian Period.

Masashige Kusunoki, a samurai warrior who was fighting against the army of the Ashikaga Clan, set a fire around Byodoin Temple in 1336. As a result of this, many of the temple buildings were burnt down, with only a few surviving.

The Byodoin Temple gradually expanded into a massive Temple complex during the Kamakura Period, where Jodo-in Temple was opened due to the renovation of Byodoin Temple in 1496; Rakan-dō Hall was established in 1640; Saisho-in Temple was established in 1654.

A full-scale renovation of the Amida-dō Hall (Phoenix Hall) was undertaken in 1670, during which the front doors were replaced. Two sub-temples, Jodo-in Temple belonging to the Jodo Sect and Saisho-in Temple belonging to the Tendai Sect, began to cooperate and made a great effort to maintain the operation of Byodoin Temple. In 1698, Uji was devastated by a large fire, and Byodoin Temple was badly damaged. The walls and doors of Phoenix Hall were ruined after this incident. However, as a result of the deterioration of the temple, people's will for Phoenix Hall's preservation and renovation became enthusiastic.

During the Meiji Period (1868–1912) and Showa Period (1926–1989), large-scale renovation of the Phoenix Hall was undertaken. The Phoenix Hall and Amida Buddha statue were designated as National Treasures in 1951, and Phoenix Hall was also selected for the design as the obverse of the 10 yen coin. Then, the Temple Bell, the praying Bodhisattva on Clouds, the Canopy, and the paintings on the door and walls of Cho-dō Hall of Phoenix Hall were designated as National Treasures.

The Byodoin Temple was designated as a UNESCO World Heritage site as one of the Historic Monuments of Ancient Kyoto in 1994. Large-scale renovation of the garden, the canopy of the Amida Buddha statue, and the overall outlook of the Phoenix Hall continues in the Heisei Period (1989–2019) until today.

The most famous building in the temple is the Phoenix Hall (鳳凰堂, Hōō-dō) or the Amida Hall, constructed in 1053. It is the only remaining original building, surrounded by a scenic pond; additional buildings making up the compound were burnt down during a civil war in 1336.

== Complex ==
=== Phoenix Hall ===
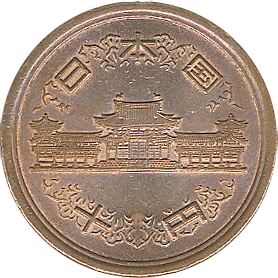
Japanese 10 yen coin (obverse) showing Phoenix Hall

The main building in Byōdō-in, the Phoenix Hall, consists of a central hall, flanked by twin wing corridors on both sides of the central hall, and a tail corridor. The central hall houses an image of Amida Buddha. The roof of the hall displays statues of the Chinese phoenix, called hōō in Japanese. The architecture was influenced by the Chinese style (popular in the capital). The building is regarded as almost the sole remaining example from the Fujiwara Regent Period, which is also considered as one of the most important cultural assets of Japan.

The Phoenix Hall, completed in 1053, is the exemplar of Fujiwara Amida halls. It consists of a main rectangular structure flanked by two L-shaped wing corridors and a tail corridor, set at the edge of a large artificial pond. Though its official name is Amida-dō, it began to be called Hōō-dō, or Phoenix Hall, at the beginning of the Edo period. This name is considered to derive both from the building's likeness to a Chinese phoenix with outstretched wings and a tail, and the pair of phoenixes adorning the roof.

Inside the Phoenix Hall, a single image of Amida (c. 1053) is installed on a high platform. The Amida sculpture is made of Japanese cypress and is covered with gold leaf. It was executed by Jōchō, who established a new canon of proportions and a new technique, yosegi, in which multiple pieces of wood are carved out like shells and joined from the inside. The statue measures about three meters high from its face to its knees. Sitting in a meditation position with his back slightly hunched, his body is relaxed without any tension. His hand gesture is called 'Inso', in which both hands are placed on the lap, palms facing upward; the thumbs and forefingers form a circle. This gesture is a variation of the Dhyana Mudra (Meditation Mudra), which suggests concentration of the Good Law. The Urna, which is the white dot on his forehead between the eyes, is the Third Eye of the Amida Buddha, a symbol of awakening and the ability to see the suffering of all creatures. The serene smile of the statue represents the nobility of the Buddha after attaining Enlightenment. With a harmonious and gentle facial expression, he is looking slightly downward, which shows the state of meditation, as well as the feeling of merciful grace towards the audience. His hair is short and curled, along with the Ushnisha, which is the pointed topknot located at the center of the head.

Applied to the walls of the hall are small relief carvings of celestials, the host believed to have accompanied Amida when he descended from the Western Paradise to gather the souls of believers at the moment of death and transport them in lotus blossoms to Paradise. Raigō paintings on the wooden doors of the Phoenix Hall, depicting the Descent of the Amida Buddha, are an early example of Yamato-e, Japanese-style painting, and contain representations of the scenery around Kyoto.

There is a Jōdo-shiki garden with a pond in front of the building, which in 1997 was dredged as part of an archaeological dig. As the temple faces east, it suggests that the audience needs to cross the Aji-ike pond in front of the Phoenix Hall in order to reach Buddhist Pure Land. The gardens are a nationally designated Historic Site and Place of Scenic Beauty.

=== Kannon-dō Hall ===
The Kannon-dō Hall is an Important Cultural Property, established on the former site of the main hall around 1230, during the Early Kamakura Period. The hall structure is simple, following the classical design from the Tenpyō period (710-794), with two different forms bent to support the roof. It is currently under renovation and not open to the public.

=== Yorin-an Shoin Residence ===
It is a residence as well as one of the sub-temples in the precinct. Built in the early Edo Period (around the 17th century), the roof is thatched with Japanese cypress bark, and the materials used for construction were believed to have come from remains of the Momoyama Castle. The interior wall paintings were the works produced by artists who belonged to the studio run by Sansetsu Kano, while the garden is said to have been designed by Sansai Hosokawa.

=== Hoshokan Museum ===
As the former temple museum, which opened in 1965, had become outdated, an innovative third-generation museum was opened in 2001, named the Hoshokan Museum. This museum achieved a significantly improved storage and display environment for national treasures from the Byodoin Temple, including the Temple Bell, 26 statues of the Praying Bodhisattva on Clouds, and a pair of phoenixes from the rooftop of Phoenix Hall. It is the first comprehensive museum run by a religious organisation. The majority of the museum buildings are hidden underground, so that the exterior outlook of the museum blends with Phoenix Hall and other building complexes within the temple. Due to its design, the interior of the museum receives sufficient natural sunlight, as well as artificial lighting to keep the exhibition halls bright and comfortable for the audience's experience.

Entry to the complex grounds costs 700 yen for adults and includes access to the gardens and the museum. An entry pass to the Phoenix Hall, which was newly restored in March 2014, costs an additional 300 yen and can be purchased near the gate. The tour is conducted in Japanese; an English paper guidebook is provided.

=== Byodoin Tea Salon Toka ===
A tea salon to try authentic Uji green tea in the precinct of Byodoin Temple. Tea leaves harvested in the tea fields of Uji City or neighbouring farms are used. Certified Japanese Tea Instructors will provide tea to visitors with the finest care and knowledge. Open Monday to Sunday but closed on Tuesday, from 10:00 to 16:30. Last order is at 16:00.

== Commemoration ==
Japan commemorates the building's longevity and cultural significance by displaying its image on the 10 yen coin, and the 10,000 yen note features the phoenix image.

The Japanese post has issued three definitive postage stamps showing the phoenix hall, each prepaying the then postal rate for a surface mail foreign letter: 1950, 24 yen 1957 and 30 yen 1959. Stamps were produced by the costly engraving method, showing the appreciation of the hall.

The Phoenix Hall, the great statue of Amida inside it, and several other items at Byōdō-in are national treasures.

In December 1994, UNESCO listed the building as a World Heritage Site as part of the "Historic Monuments of Ancient Kyoto".

=== Replica ===
A half-size replica of the temple was completed on June 7, 1968, in the Valley of the Temples (Oʻahu, Hawaii). The replica was built with concrete, whereas the original is wooden and without nails.

== Gallery ==
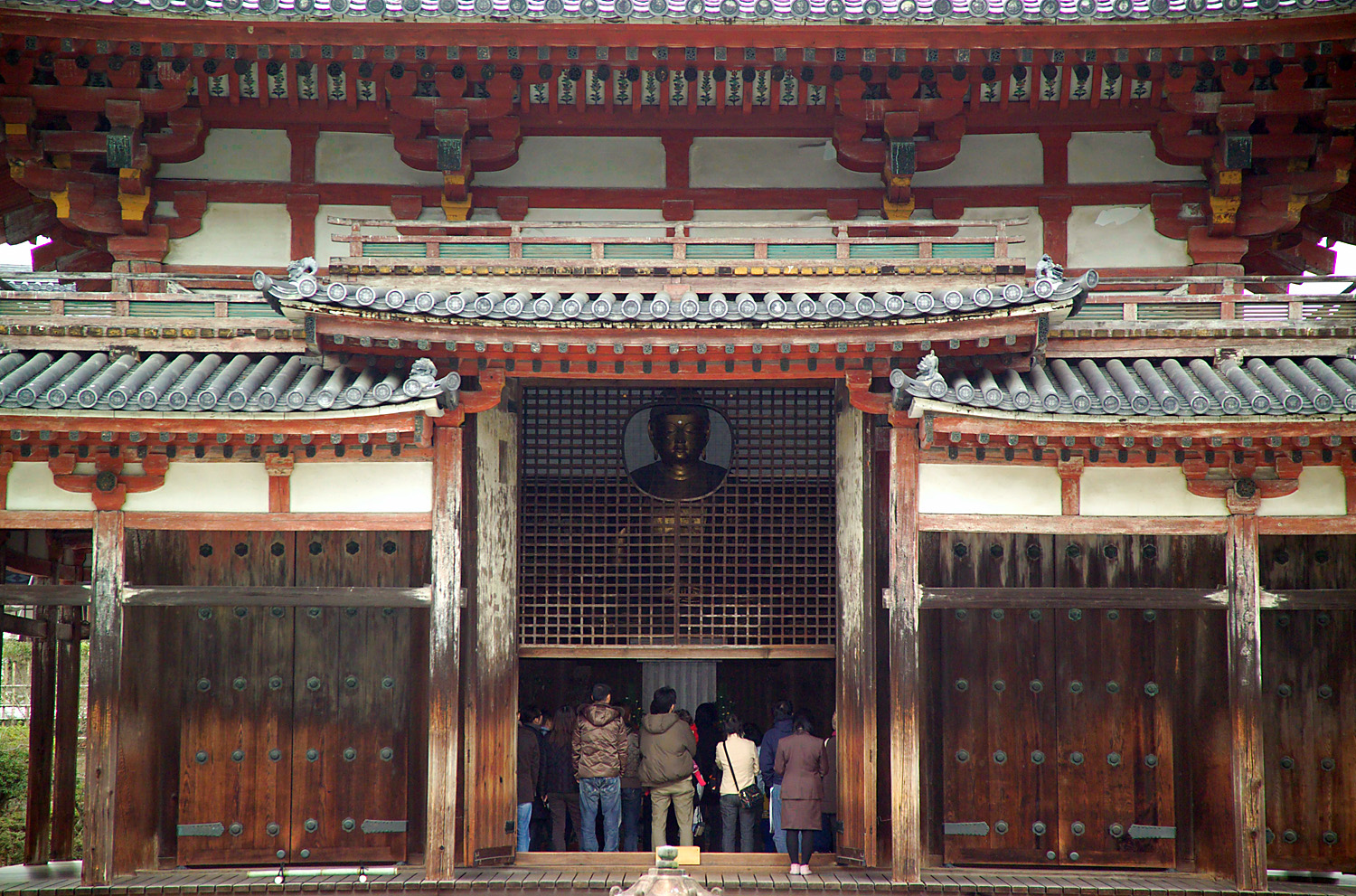
The head of the Jōchō statue of Amitābha is visible in this photo of the Phoenix Hall.

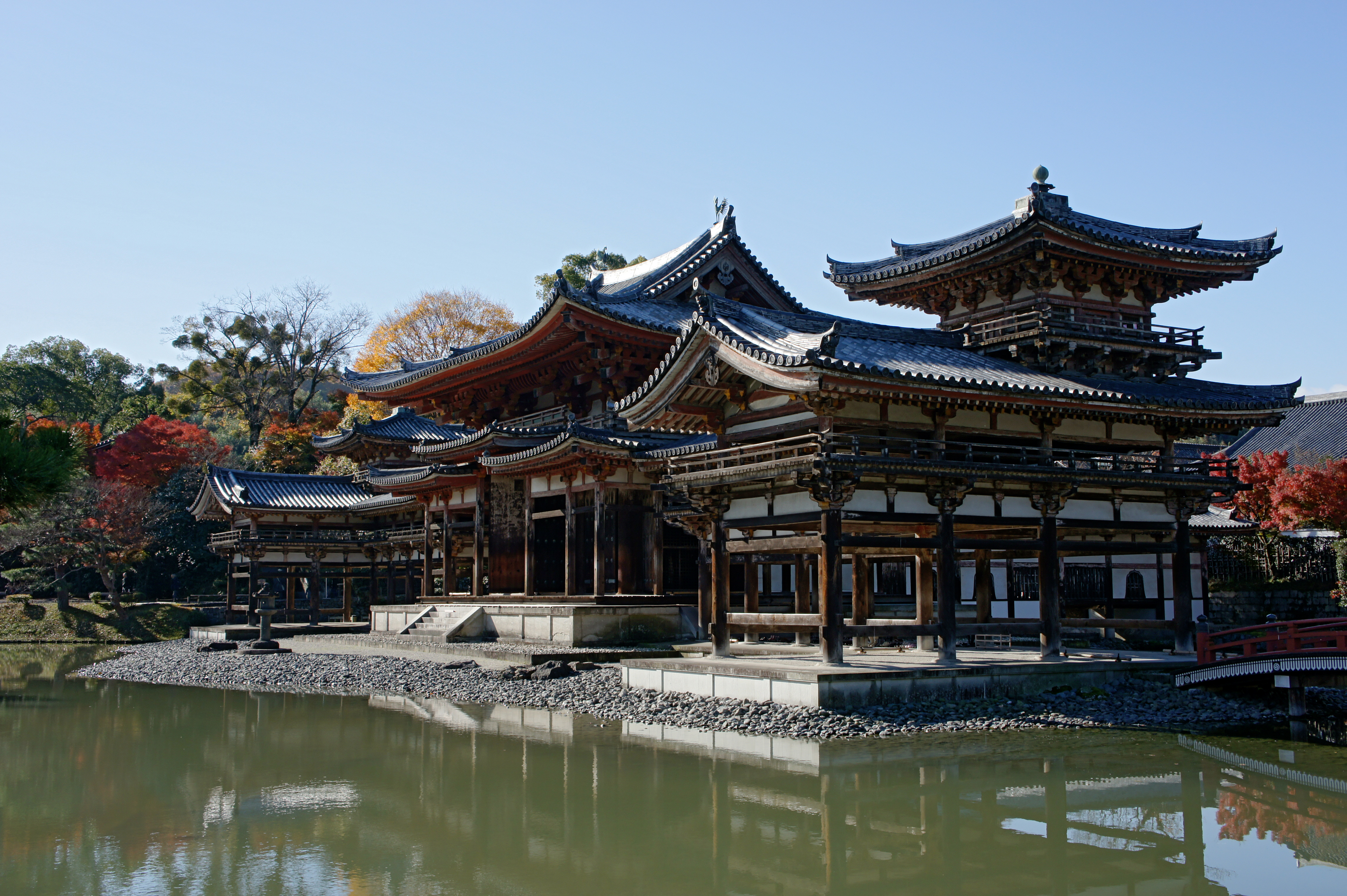
Left side of Phoenix Hall

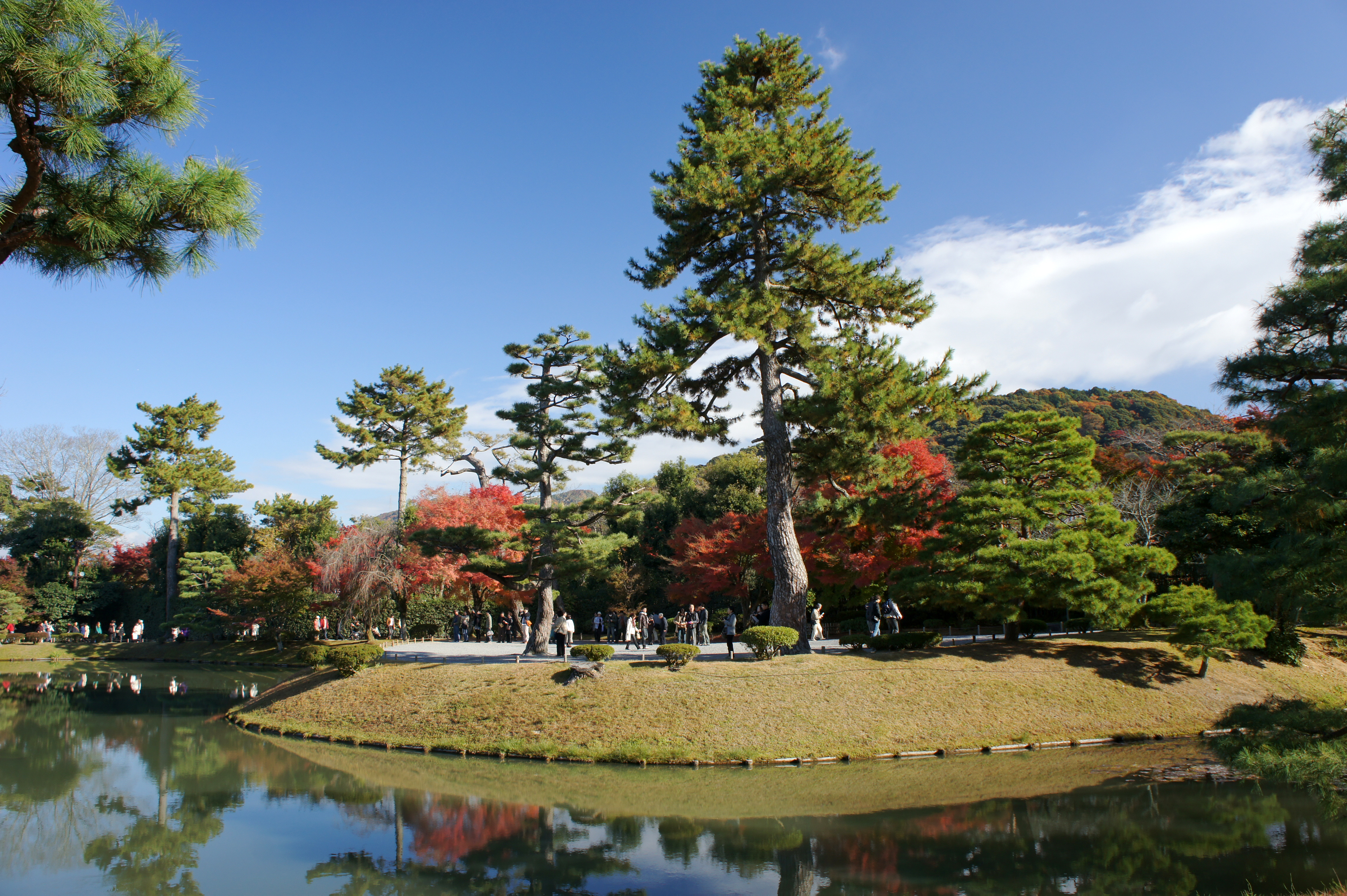
The garden in front of the Phoenix Hall.

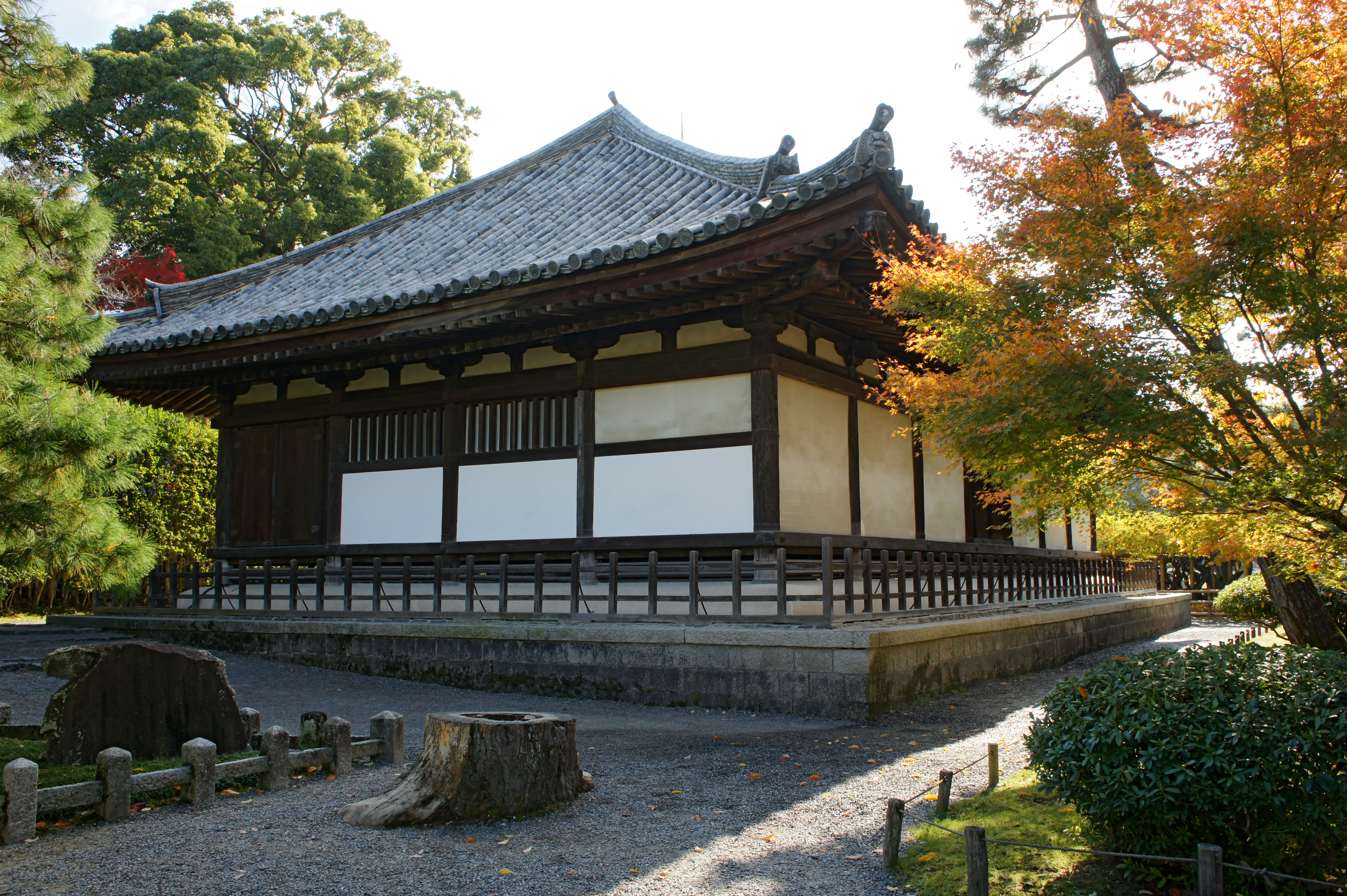
Kannondo

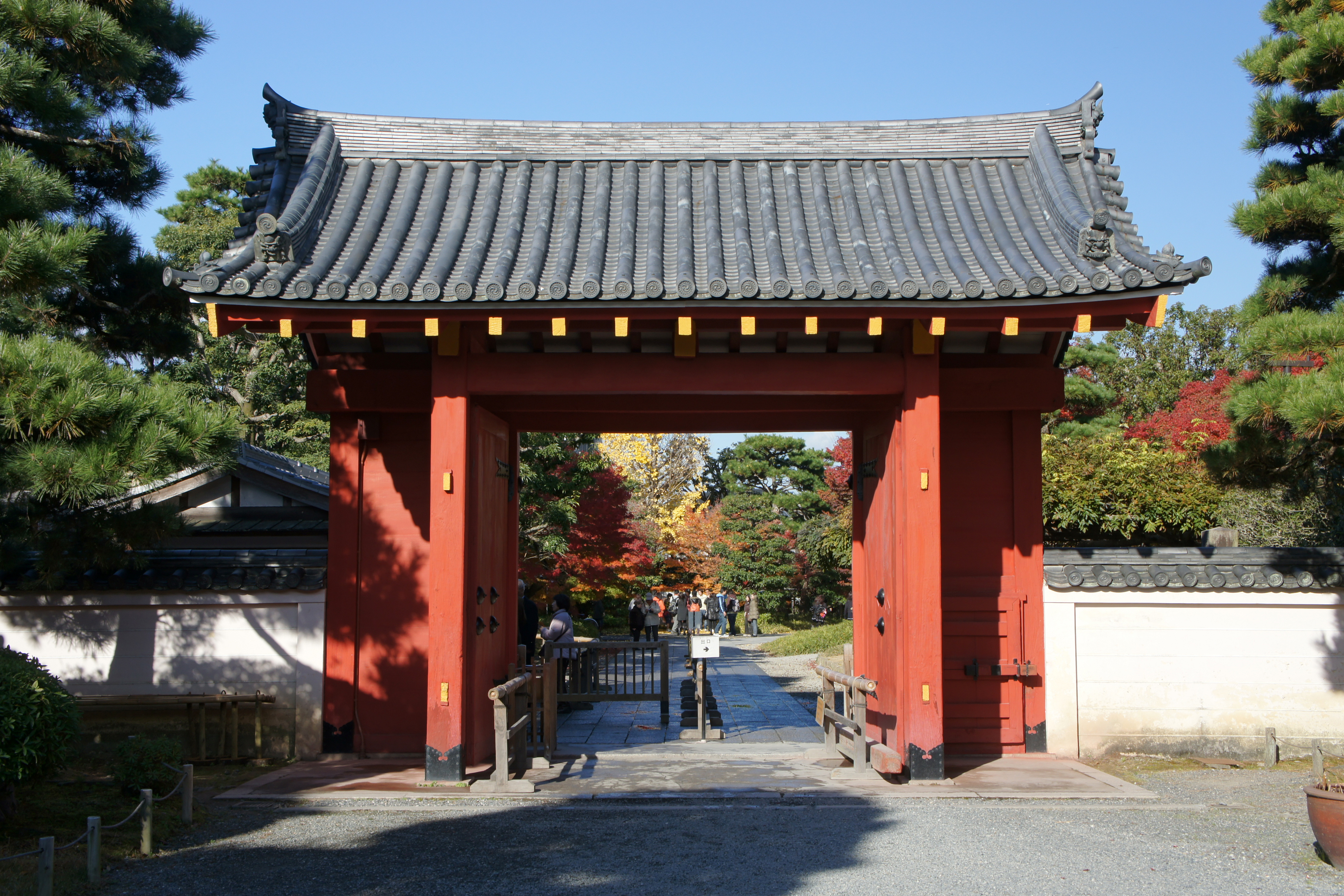
Omotemon, the main gate.

(video) Tourists walking into the Phoenix Hall on a sunny day.

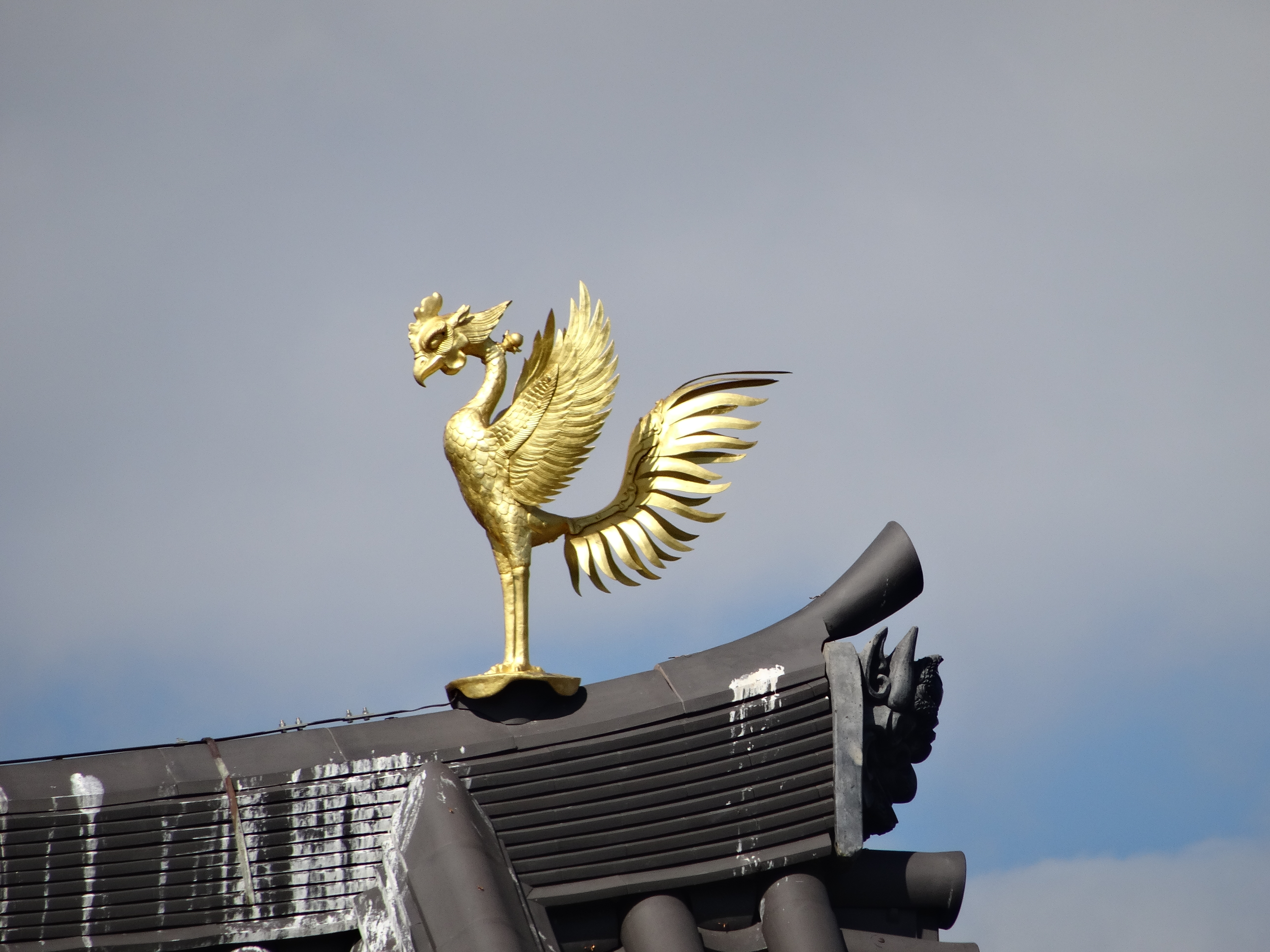
Byōdō-in Phoenix-Statue

== See also ==
- Battle of Uji (1180)
- List of National Treasures of Japan (crafts-others)
- List of National Treasures of Japan (paintings)
- List of National Treasures of Japan (sculptures)
- List of National Treasures of Japan (temples)
- Shinden-zukuri

== Bibliography ==
- Fukuyama Toshio, Heian Temples: Byodo-in and Chuson-ji, Heibonsha Survey of Japanese Art (New York: Weatherhill, 1976). ISBN 9780834810235
