= Seiwa Genji =

Line of the Japanese Minamoto clan

Seiwa Genji 源
- The emblem (mon) of the Minamoto clan, of which the Seiwa Genji were a branch
- Parent house: Minamoto clan
- Founder: Sons/grandsons of Emperor Seiwa, e.g. Minamoto no Tsunemoto (源 経基)
- Final ruler: Minamoto no Sanetomo
- Founding year: 10th century
- Cadet branches: Ashikaga clan; Hatakeyama clan; Hosokawa clan; Imagawa clan; Mori; Nanbu clan; Nitta clan; Matsudaira clan; Tokugawa clan; Ogasawara clan; Ōta clan; Shigeno clan; Satake clan; Satomi clan; Shiba clan; Takeda clan; Toki clan; Ishikawa clan; others

The Seiwa Genji (清和源氏; Japanese pronunciation: [sei.wa ɡeꜜɲ.dʑi, seː-]) is a line of the Japanese Minamoto clan that is descended from Emperor Seiwa, which is the most successful and powerful line of the clan. Many of the most famous Minamoto members, including Minamoto no Yoshitsune, Minamoto no Yoritomo, the founder of the Kamakura shogunate; and Ashikaga Takauji, the founder of the Ashikaga shogunate, belonged to this line. Tokugawa Ieyasu (1543–1616), founder of the Tokugawa shogunate, also claimed descent from this lineage. The family is named after Emperor Seiwa, whose four sons and twelve grandsons founded the Seiwa Genji. Emperor Seiwa was father of Imperial Prince Sadazumi (貞純親王 Sadazumi Shinnō) (873–916), who was in turn the father of Minamoto no Tsunemoto (源経基) (894–961), one of the founders of the Seiwa Genji, from whom most Seiwa Genji members are descended. Many samurai families belong to this line and used "Minamoto" clan name in official records, such as the Ashikaga, Hatakeyama, Hosokawa, Imagawa, Mori, Nanbu, Nitta, Ogasawara, Ōta, Satake, Satomi, Shiba, Takeda, Toki and the Tsuchiya, among others. The Shimazu and Tokugawa clans also claimed to belong to this line.

A group of Shinto shrines connected closely with the clan is known as the Three Genji Shrines (源氏三神社 Genji San Jinja).

== Family tree ==
The following family trees are a non-exhaustive listing of the Seiwa Genji and the clans that branched from the family.

Legend: Solid lines represent blood relationship; dashed lines represent adoptions. An asterisk indicates a monk (who would not have been allowed to retain the Minamoto name).

=== Emperor Seiwa's first five princes ===
Descendants of Emperor Seiwa's first five sons

(Emperor Seiwa)
(Prince Sadaakira)	(Prince Sadakata)	(Prince Sadamoto)	(Prince Sadahira)	(Prince Sadayasu)
Kunifuchi	Kanetada	Kanenobu	Kunitada	Kuniuzu
Shigeyuki

=== Prince Sadazumi's descendants ===
Family of Seiwa Genji

Emperor Seiwa
Prince Sadazumi
Minamoto no Tsunemoto	{{{TUN}}}
Minamoto no Mitsunaka	Mitsumasa	Mitsusue	Mitsuzane	Mitsuyoshi	Mitsuo	Mitsu(shige?)	Mitsuyori	Kimifushi
Yorimitsu	Yorichika	Minamoto no Yorinobu	Yorihira	Yoriaki	Yorisada	Yorizane	Takamichi	Yori(hiro?)	Genken*	Tadasue
Settsu Genji	Yamato Genji	Kawachi Genji

=== Emperor Seiwa's other princes ===
Family of Seiwa Genji

(Emperor Seiwa)
(Prince Sadatoki)	(Prince Sadakazu)	(Prince Sadazane)	(Prince Sadayori)	Nagafuchi	Nagamichi	Nagami	Nagayori
Tameyoshi(?)	Shigemoto	Shigehira	Shigekata	Motosuke

=== Settsu Genji ===
Family of Seiwa Genji

Minamoto no Yorimitsu
Yorikuni	Yoriie	Yorimoto
Yorinori	Yorisuke	Yorizane	Sanekuni	Yoritsuna	Rokujōsai-in no Senji	Kunifusa	Moromitsu
Akikuni	Nakamasa	Raishi	Seishi	Kuninao	Mitsukuni	Sanetoshi	Mitsutaka
Yukikuni	Tsunemitsu	Yorimasa	Yoriyuki	Mitsushige	Yasumasa	Kunimasa	Kunimoto	Toki clan	Mitsuyasu
Tada Genji	Nakatsuna	Kanetsuna	Masatsuna	Nakaie	Yorikane	Hirotsuna	Sanuki	Gishūmon-in no Tango	Jūshi
Munetsuna	Aritsuna	Nakamitsu	Yorishige

=== Yamato Genji ===
Family of Seiwa Genji

Yorichika
Yorinari	Yorifusa	Yoritō	Yorimoto
Yoritoshi	Mutsu Ishikawa clan
Yori(kaze?)	Yoriharu	Yori(kage?)
Yoriyasu	(several clans)	(several clans)
Shinjitsu*
Genjitsu*
Jitsuben*
Jūren*

=== Kawachi Genji ===
Family of Seiwa Genji

Minamoto no Yorinobu
Yoriyoshi	Yorikiyo	Yorisue	Yoritō	Yoshimasa
Yoshiie	Yoshitsuna	Yoshimitsu	Kaiyo*	Murakami clan	Inoue clan
Yoshimune	Yoshichika	Yoshikuni	Yoshitada
Yoshinobu	Yoshitoshi	Yoshiyasu	Yoshiyuki	Munekiyo	Nitta, Ashikaga clans
Tameyoshi	Tsunekuni	Yoshitaka	Tadamune	Yoshikiyo	Yoshikatsu
Yoshitomo	Yoshikata	Yoshihiro	Yorikata	Yorinaka	Tamemune	Tamenari	Tametomo	Tamenaka	Yukiie
Nakaie	Yoshinaka
Yoshihira	Tomonaga	Yoritomo; Shogun	Yoshikado	Mareyoshi	Noriyori	Zenjō	Gien*	Yoshitsune
Yoriie; Shogun	Sanetomo; Shogun	Jōgyō*
Ichiman	Kugyō*	Eijitsu*	Zengyō*

=== Yoshimitsu's descendants ===
Family of Seiwa Genji

Yoshimitsu
Yoshinari	Sanemitsu	Yoshikiyo	Moriyoshi	Chikayoshi
Masayoshi	Yoshisada	Kiyomitsu	Hiraga and Ōuchi clans
Satake clan	Yoshitsune	Yoshikane	Mitsunaga	Nobuyoshi	Tōmitsu	Yoshisada	Yoshitō
Tadayori	Kanenobu	Takeda clan	Mitsutomo	Nagakiyo	Mitsuyuki

=== Mitsumasa's descendants ===
Family of Seiwa Genji

Mitsumasa
Tadashige	Tadataka	Tadakuni
Sadamune	Sadashige	Yūshinai-shinnō-ke no Kii(?)	Masayori	Shigetaka	Yoshitsune
Shigemune	Yoshizumi clan
Shigezane	Shigenaga	Shigetoki
Shigenari	Shigesada	Shigetō	Tokinari	Shigekuni	Suetō
Shigenao	Shigeyori	Shigefusa	Shigeto	Mitsusue	Suesada
Shigemitsu	Shigemune	Shigenaga	Shigetaka	Shigekiyo	Mitsuyuki
Shigetada	Shigetomo	Shigehide	Shigeyuki	Chikayuki

=== Mitsuyoshi's descendants ===
Family of Seiwa Genji

Mitsuyoshi
Mitsukuni	Yukiyori	Yorisue
Tamemitsu
Tametomo
Tamehira	Tameyoshi	Tamekuni	Tamezane	Tamemoto	Tameuji
Chiku and Sengoku clans	(several clans)	Niyanagi and Natsume clans	(several clans)	Katagiri clan	(several clans)

=== Nitta and Ashikaga ===
Emperor Seiwa
"Hachimantarō" Yoshiie
Minamoto no Yoshichika	Minamoto no Yoshikuni
Nitta clan	Ashikaga clan
Minamoto no Tameyoshi	Nitta Yoshishige	Ashikaga Yoshiyasu
Yamana clan
Minamoto no Yoshitomo	Nitta Yoshikane	Yamana Yoshinori	Ashikaga Yoshikane	Minamoto no Yoshikiyo
Minamoto no Yoritomo	Ashikaga Yoshiuji	Hirosawa Yoshizane
Kira clan	Hosokawa clan
Ashikaga Yasuuji	Kira Osauji	Hosokawa Yoshisue
Uesugi clan	Imagawa clan
Uesugi Shigefusa	Ashikaga Yoriuji	Kira Mitsuuji	Imagawa Kuniuji
Uesugi Yorishige	Ashikaga Ietoki
Uesugi Kiyoko	Ashikaga Sadauji	Hōjō Hisatoki
Nitta Yoshisada	Ashikaga Takauji	Akahashi Tōshi	Hōjō Moritoki
Ashikaga Yoshiakira

== See also ==
- Sakai clan

== Sources ==
- Sansom, George (1958). A History of Japan to 1334. Stanford, California: Stanford University Press.
- Turnbull, Stephen (1998). The Samurai Sourcebook. London: Cassell & Co.
