= Kawachi Genji =

Certain members of the Japanese Minamoto clan

Kawachi Genji 河内源氏
- family crest
- Home province: Kawachi Province; Tsūhō-ji
- Parent house: Seiwa Genji
- Titles: Shōgun; Various others
- Founder: Minamoto no Yorinobu
- Final ruler: Minamoto no Sanetomo
- Founding year: 10th century
- Dissolution: 1219
- Ruled until: 1219, Minamoto no Sanetomo assassinated
- Cadet branches: Hiraga clan; Ashikaga clan; Hatakeyama clan; Hosokawa clan; Imagawa clan; Mori; Nanbu clan; Nitta clan; Matsudaira clan; Tokugawa clan; Ogasawara clan; Ōta clan; Satake clan; Satomi clan; Shiba clan; Takeda clan; Toki clan; Ishikawa Clan; others

The Kawachi Genji (河内源氏) were members of a family line within that of the Seiwa Genji, which in turn was one of several branches of the Minamoto clan, one of the most famous noble clans in Japanese history. Descended from Minamoto no Yorinobu (968–1048), the Kawachi Genji included Minamoto no Yoshiie (1041–1108), who fought in the Zenkunen War and Gosannen War, and common ancestor of nearly all the major Minamoto generals of the Genpei War from which the Minamoto are famous.

== Lineage ==
Note: Each degree of indentation indicates a father-son relationship.

- Yorinobu (968–1048) – son of Minamoto no Mitsunaka The commander who put down Taira no Tadatsune's Rebellion. Founder and leader of the Kawachi Genji.
  - Yoriyoshi (998–1075) – son of Yorinobu; hero of the Zenkunen War Second-generation leader of the Kawachi Genji.
    - Yoshitsuna (died 1134) – son of Yoriyoshi
    - Yoshimitsu (died 1127) – son of Yoriyoshi, ancestor of the Satake, Hiraga, Takeda and Okada families
    - Yoshiie (1041–1108) – son of Yoriyoshi, fought alongside his father in the Zenkunen War, led imperial forces in the Gosannen War Third-generation leader of the Kawachi Genji.
      - Minamoto no Yoshitada – Fourth son of Yoshiie, kami of Kawachi, fourth-generation leader of the Kawachi Genji. Assassinated by his uncle Minamoto no Yoshimitsu.
      - Yoshichika son of Yoshiie who started a revolt
        - Tameyoshi (1096–1156) – grandson of Yoshiie
          - Yoshitomo (1123–1160), son of Tameyoshi
            - Yoshihira (1140–1160), son of Yoshitomo
            - Yoritomo (1147–1199), son of Yoshitomo, and first Kamakura shōgun Head of the Kawachi Genji in his life.
              - Yoriie (1182–1204), son of Yoritomo, and 2nd shōgun of the Kamakura Shogunate
                - Ichiman (1198-1203), son of Yoriie, murdered on the orders of the Hojo clan
                - Kugyō (1200-1219), murdered his uncle Sanetomo and was killed himself for the crime
              - Sanetomo (1192–1219), son of Yoritomo, and 3rd shōgun of the Kamakura Shogunate
            - Noriyori (1156–1193), son of Yoshitomo
            - Yoshitsune (1159–1189), son of Yoshitomo, and one of the most famous samurai of all time
          - Tametomo (1139–1170), son of Tameyoshi
          - Yoshikata (？–1155), son of Tameyoshi
            - Yoshinaka (1154–1184), son of Yoshikata
          - Yukiie (d. 1186), son of Tameyoshi

== History ==
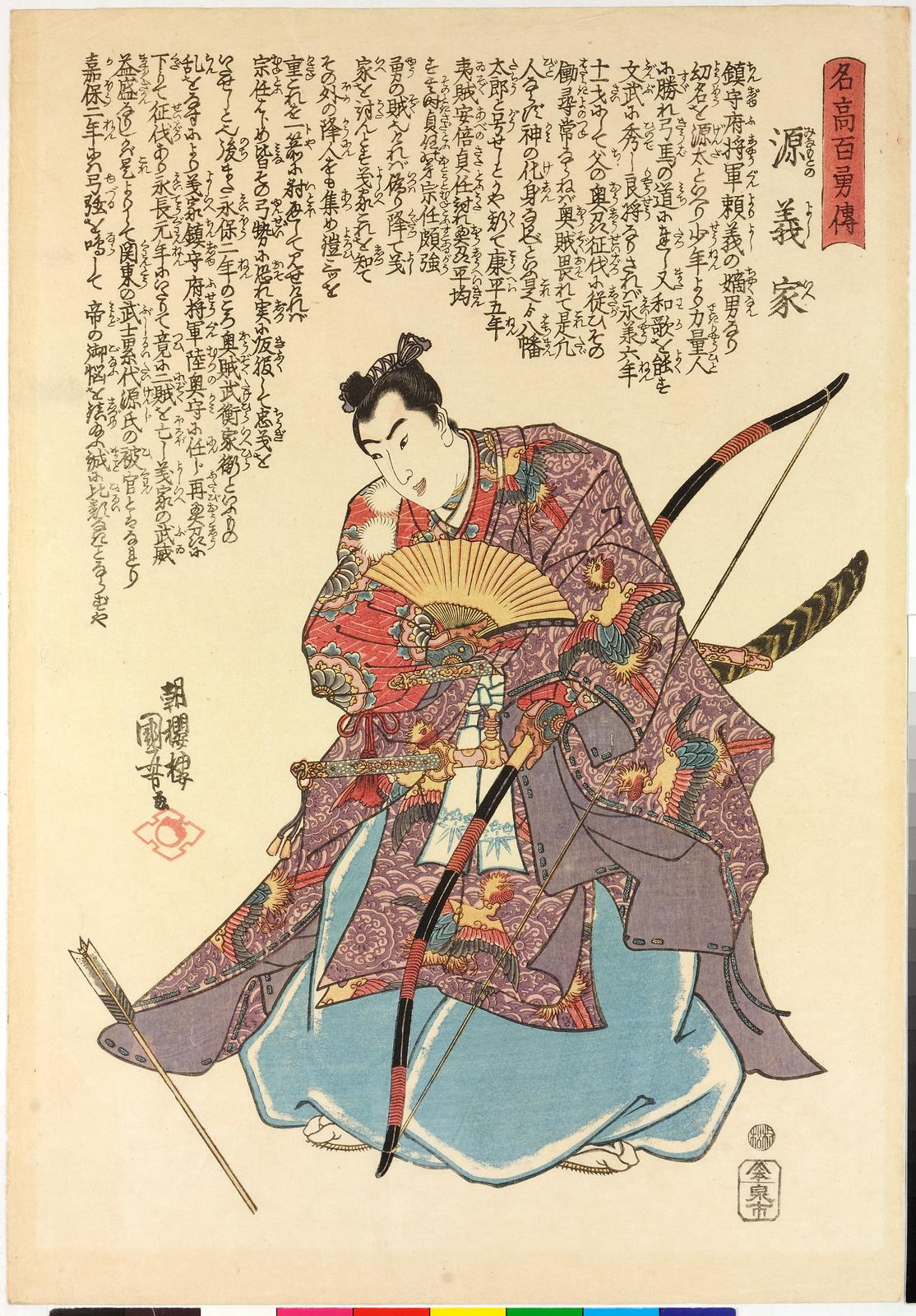
The Kawachi Genji was at one of its highest power under Minamoto no Yoshiie.

Minamoto no Yorinobu, the founder of the Kawachi Genji, was the third son of Minamoto no Mitsunaka, who put down the Taira no Tadatsune Rebellion and established his power in the Kanto region, and during the time of his son Minamoto no Yoriyoshi and Yoriyoshi's son Minamoto no Yoshiie (Hachiman Taro Yoshiie), they brought some of the Kanto samurai under their control during the Former Nine Years' War and the Later Three Years' War, and during the time of Yoshiie, he came to be regarded as the head of the samurai family. Just as Yoritomo, Yoriie, and Sanetomo are called the "Three Generations of Kamakura," Yorinobu, Yoriyoshi, and Yoshiie are also called the "Three Generations of Kawachi Genji.

Along with this, among the Bando samurai (mostly the Taira clan) in the eastern country, samurai who became the family of Kawachi-Genji were born. Yoriyoshi married the daughter of Taira no Naokata and inherited the direct power of the Bando-Heishi clan (and Kamakura). Due to the military exploits that followed other samurai and contained the great war, the legitimate stream of Kawachi-Genji came to be regarded as the leading samurai "the leader of the samurai family". Some of the Kawachi-Genji also began to settle in North Kanto (Mr. Nitta, Kozuke Province, Mr. Ashikaga, Shimotsuke Province, Mr. Satake, Hitachi Province, etc.).

However, immediately after that, Kawachi Genji's relationship with the Emperor and the aristocracy deteriorated. It was overwhelmed by the Ise-Heishi clan who connected with the Emperor, and fell after the Hogen War and the Heiji War. They later rose back up to defeat the Taira clan in the Genpei War.

While taking advantage of the value of the Kawachi-Genji branch, Minamoto no Yoritomo won the Genpei War, opened the Kamakura shogunate, and was appointed as Seii Taishogun.

== Family tree ==
=== Kawachi Genji ===
Family of Kawachi Genji

Yorinobu
Yoriyoshi	Yorikiyo	Yorisue	Yoritō	Yoshimasa
Yoshiie	Yoshitsuna	Yoshimitsu	Kaiyo*	Murakami clan	Inoue clan
Yoshimune	Yoshichika	Yoshikuni	Yoshitada
Yoshinobu	Yoshitoshi	Yoshiyasu	Yoshiyuki	Munekiyo	Nitta, Ashikaga clans
Tameyoshi	Tsunekuni	Yoshitaka	Tadamune	Yoshikiyo	Yoshikatsu
Yoshitomo	Yoshikata	Yoshihiro	Yorikata	Yorinaka	Tamemune	Tamenari	Tametomo	Tamenaka	Yukiie
Nakaie	Yoshinaka
Yoshihira	Tomonaga	Yoritomo	Yoshikado	Mareyoshi	Noriyori	Zenjō	Gien*	Yoshitsune
Yoriie	Sanetomo	Jōgyō*
Ichiman	Kugyō*	Eijitsu*	Zengyō*

== See also ==
- Hōgen rebellion
- Heiji rebellion
- Genpei War
- Kawachi Province
- Battle of Ōshū
- Kamakura shogunate
- Tsūhō-ji
- Tada Shrine
- Hachiman
