= Tsūhō-ji =

Heian period Buddhist temple ruins

Tsūhō-ji ruins
- 通法寺跡 (Japanese)
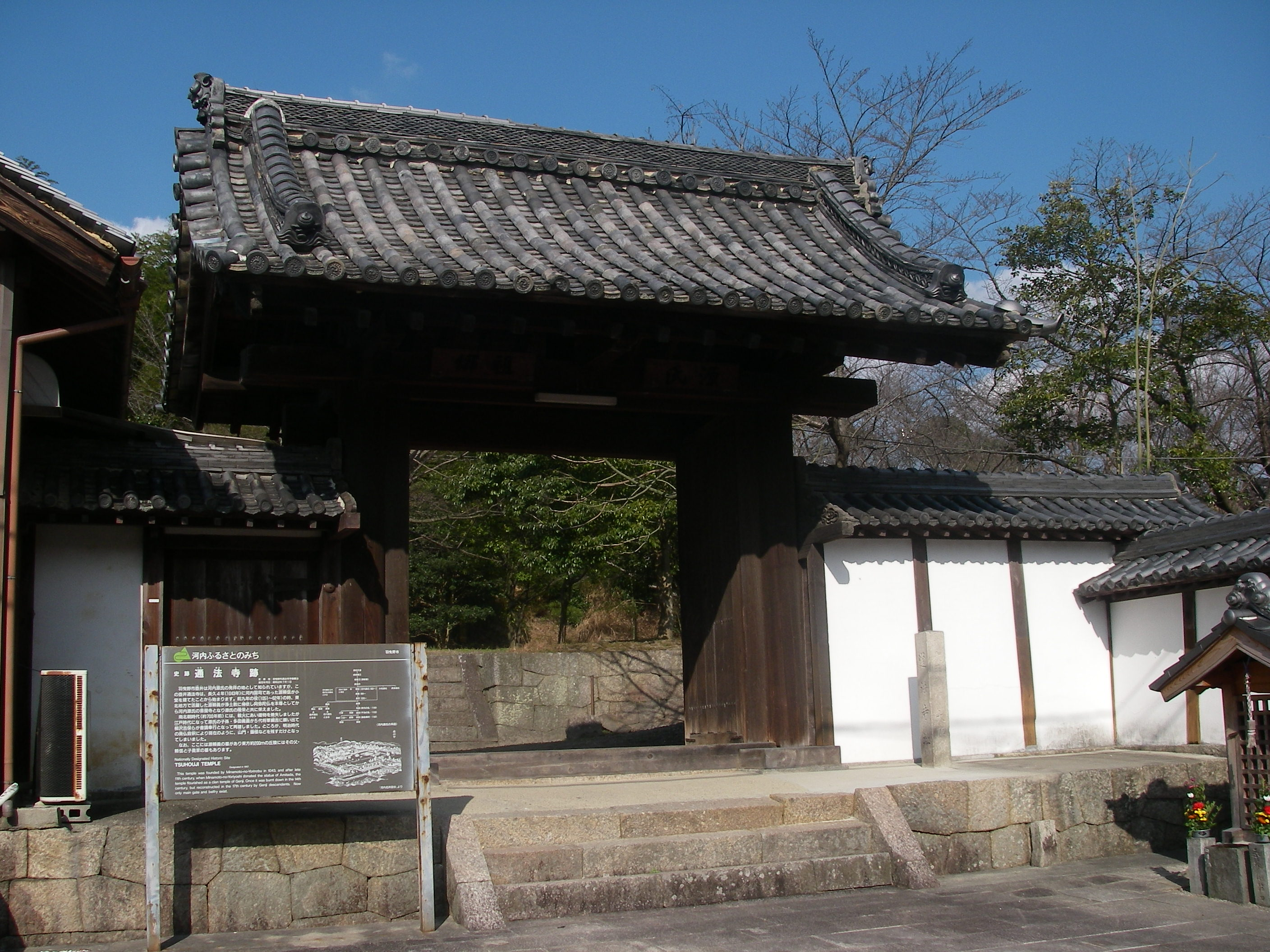
- Tsūhō-ji Sanmon

- Tsūhō-ji ruins Tsūhō-ji (Japan)
- Interactive map of Tsūhō-ji ruins
- 34°31′36.2″N 135°37′38.2″E
- Type: temple ruins
- Periods: Heian period
- Location: Habikino, Osaka, Japan
- Region: Kansai region

History
- Built: 1043

Site notes
- Public access: Yes

The Tsūhō-ji ruins (通法寺跡, Tsūhō-ji ato), is an archaeological site with the ruins of a Heian period Buddhist temple located in the Tsuboi neighborhood of the city of Habikino, Osaka, Japan. The temple no longer exists, but the temple grounds were designated as a National Historic Site in 1957.

== Overview ==
The Tsuboi area of Habiniko is the birthplace of the Kawachi Genji clan, descended from Minamoto no Yorinobu (968–1048). The Kawachi Genji included Minamoto no Yoshiie, who was the common ancestor of nearly all the major Minamoto generals of the Genpei War, including Minamoto no Yoritomo. The temple was founded in 1043 by Yorinobu's son Minamoto no Yoriyoshi, who found a life-sized image of Senjū Kannon in the ruins of a burned down hermitage, and decided to build a new temple which would be the bodaiji of his clan. The main image of the new temple was an Amida Nyorai, and the statue of Senjū Kannon was also installed. Following the exploits of his son Minamoto no Yoshiie in the Zenkunen War, and the Gosannen War, which earned him the sobriquet "Hachiman-tarō", the Tsuboi Hachimangū was also erected to the northwest of the temple.

The temple was burned down during the wars of the Nanboku-chō period. In the Edo Period, Tada Yoshinao, a descendent of the Kawachi Genji, petitioned Shogun Tokugawa Tsunayoshi to restore the temple. Yanagisawa Yoshiyasu was appointed bugyō to oversee the reconstruction. However, in 1868, with the Meiji restoration and the Haibutsu kishaku policies of the new Meiji government, the temple was abandoned.

At present, only the Sanmon gate and the shōryō bell tower remain. The temple also has what it claims to be the tomb of Minamoto no Yoriyoshi and some tōrō stone lanterns that were donated during the time of Yanagisawa Yoshiyasu. The tombs of Minamoto no Yorinobu and Minamoto no Yoshiie are in the hills some 200 meters the southeast.

The temple site is about a 20-minute walk from Kaminotaishi Station on the Kintetsu Railway Kintetsu Minami Osaka Line.

== Gallery ==
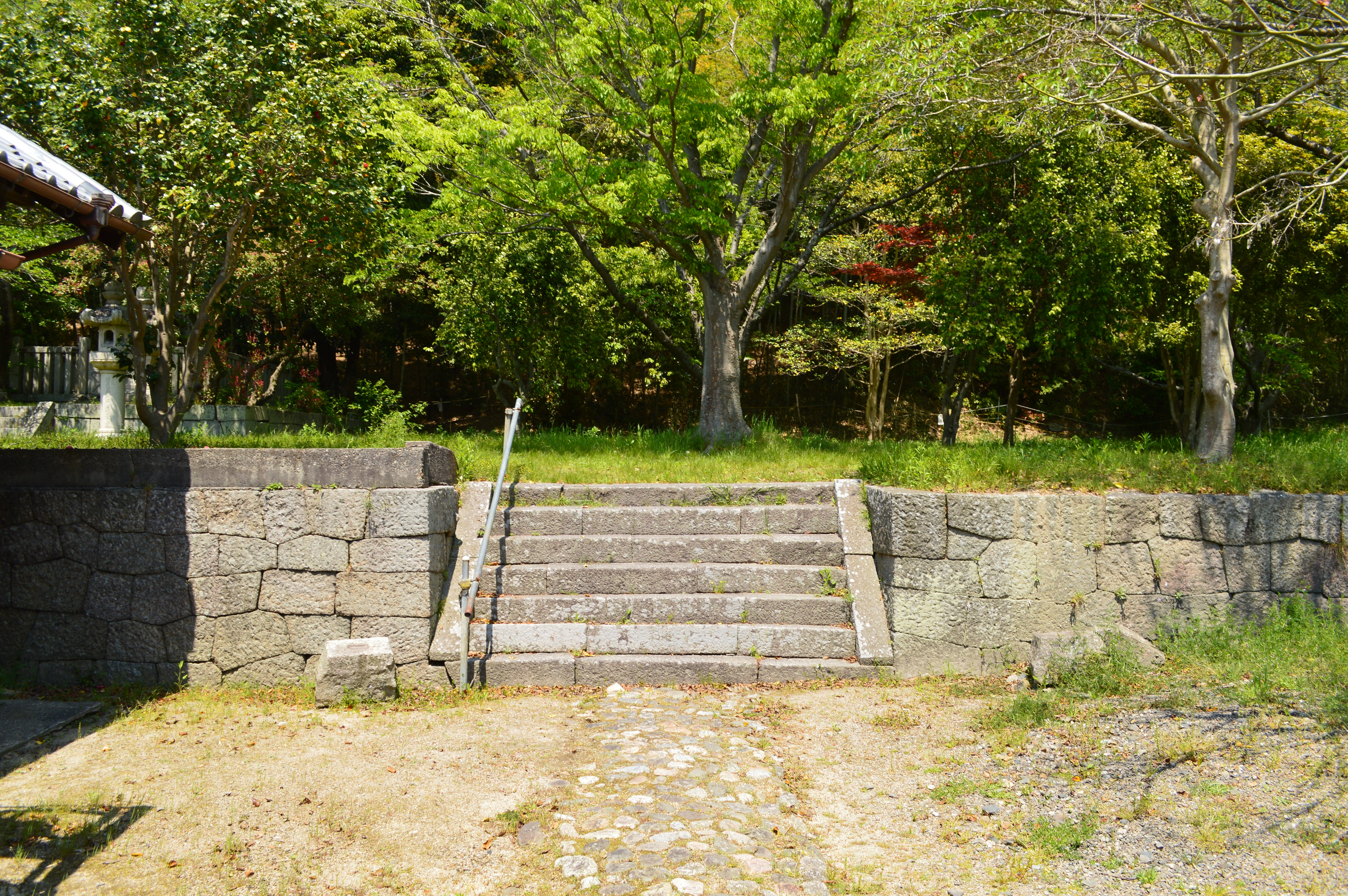
Precincts

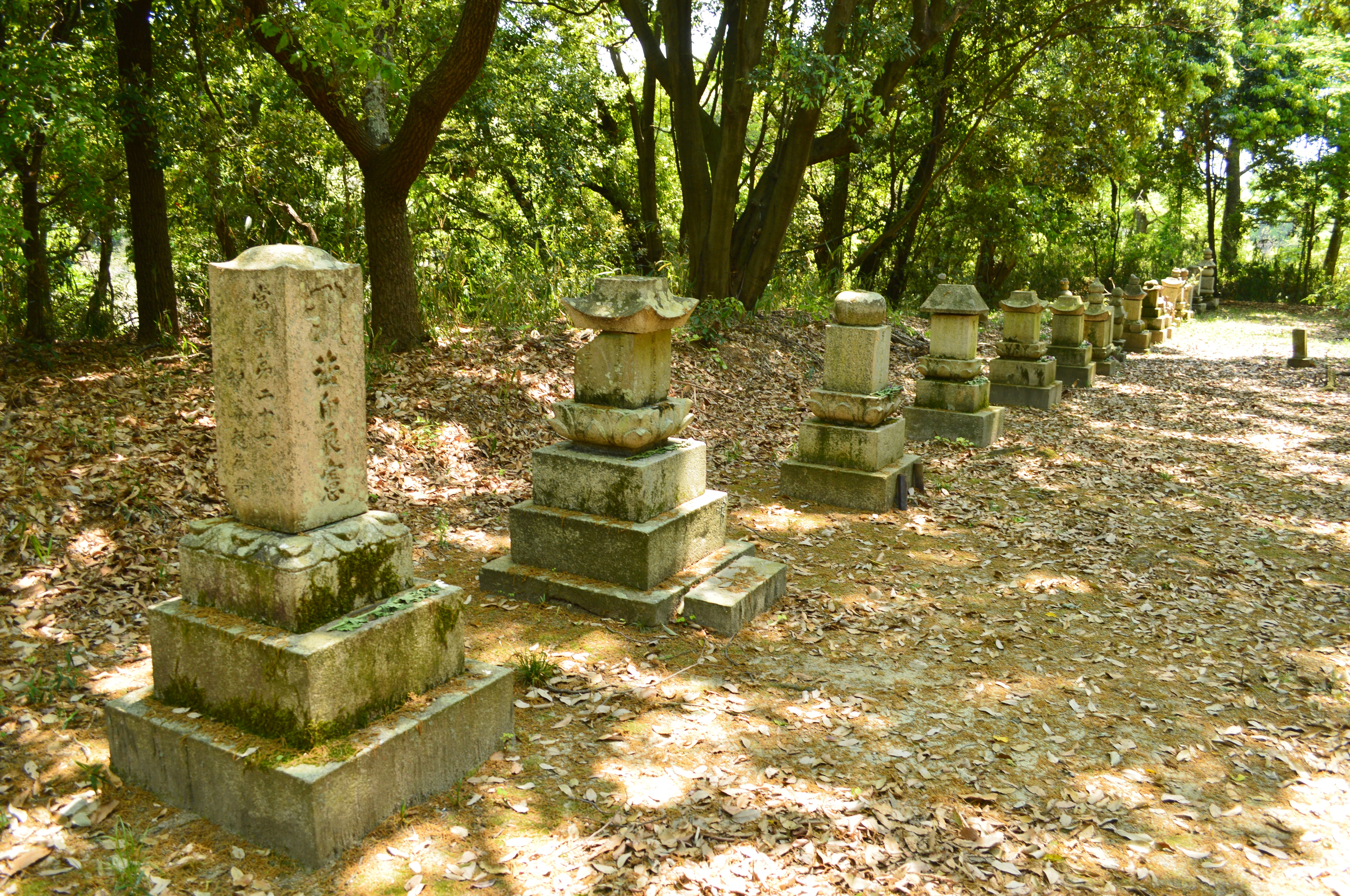
Graves of the priests of Tsūhō-ji

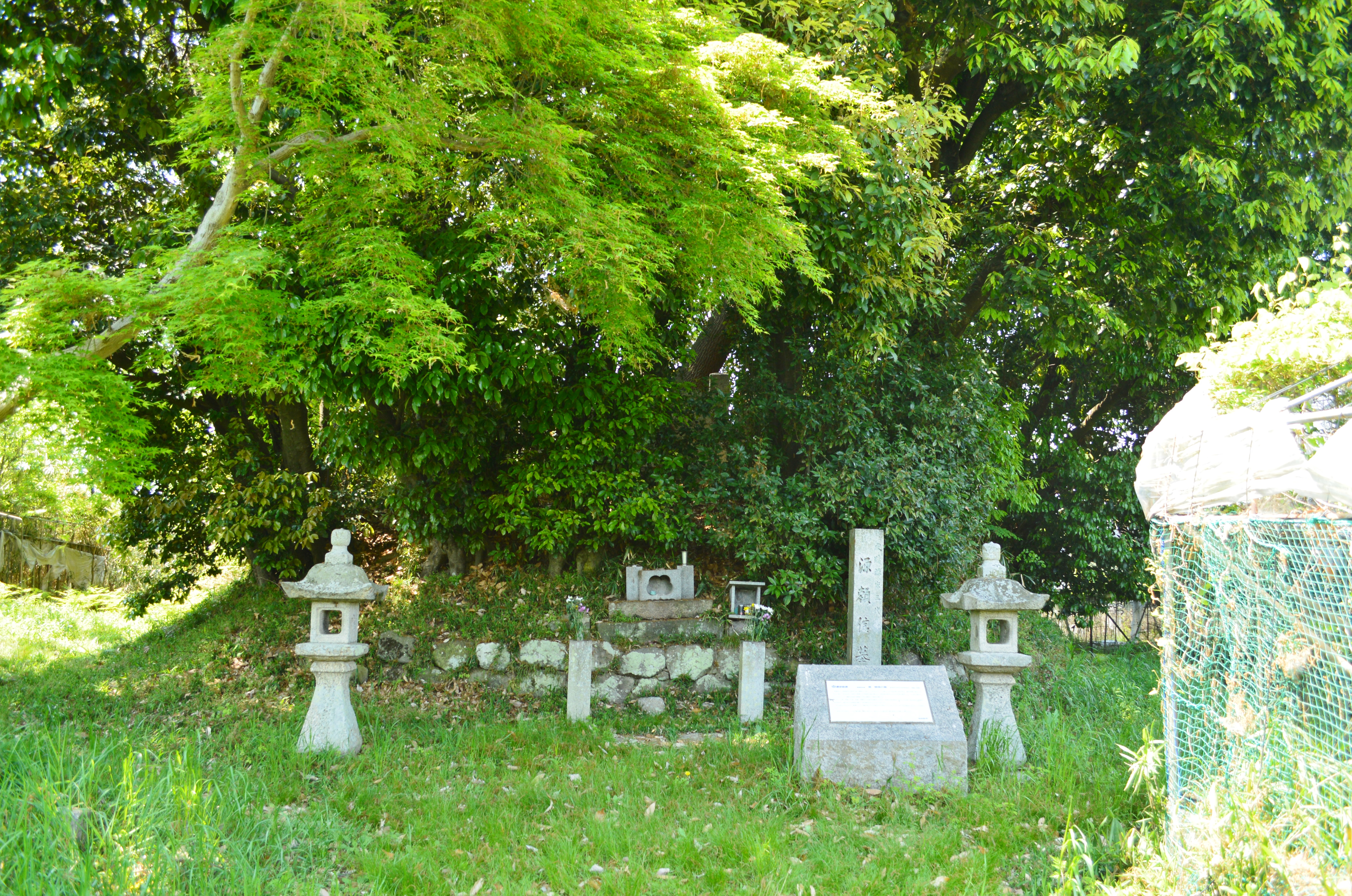
Minamoto no Yorinobu grave

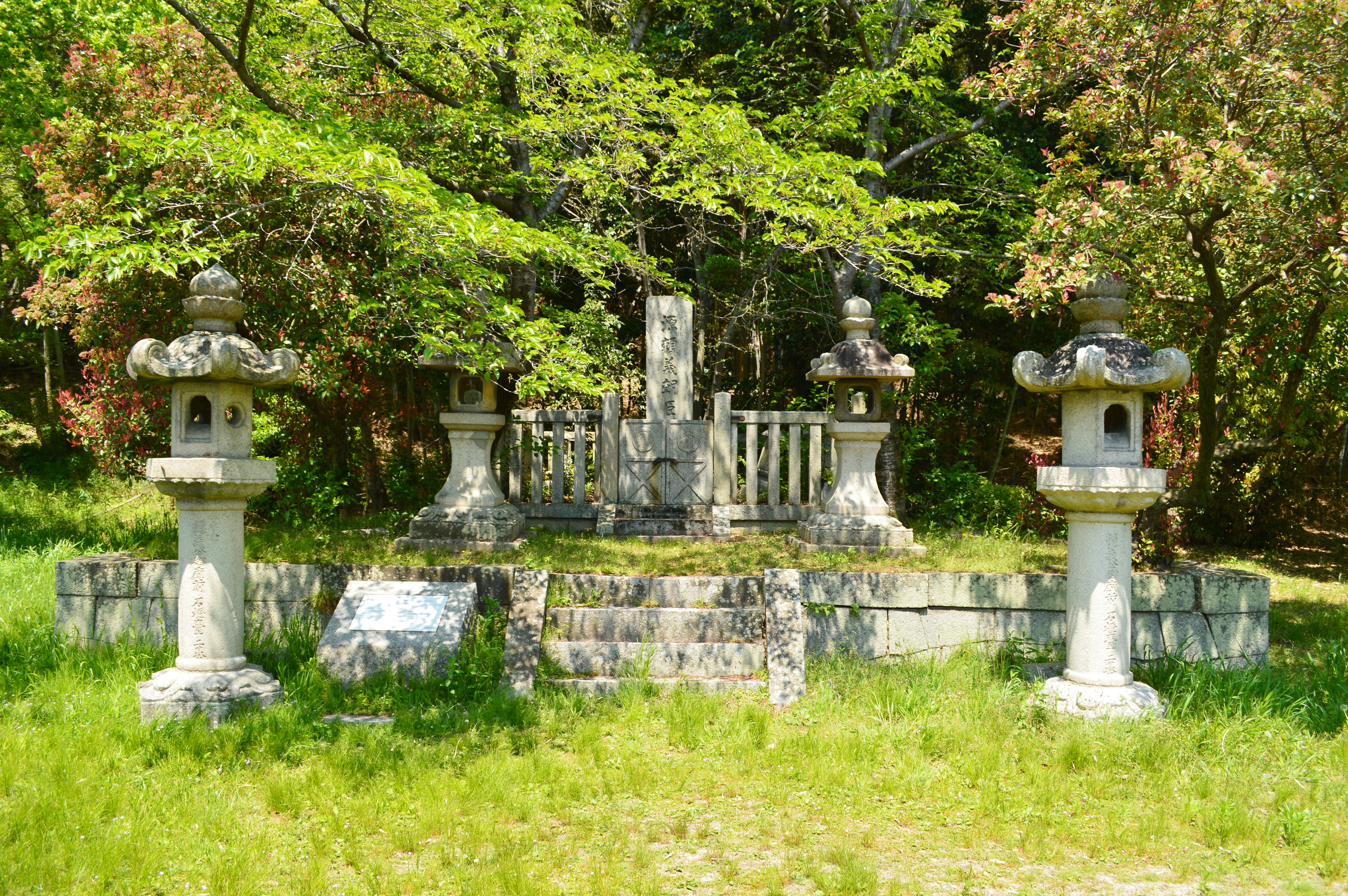
Minamoto no Yoriyoshi grave

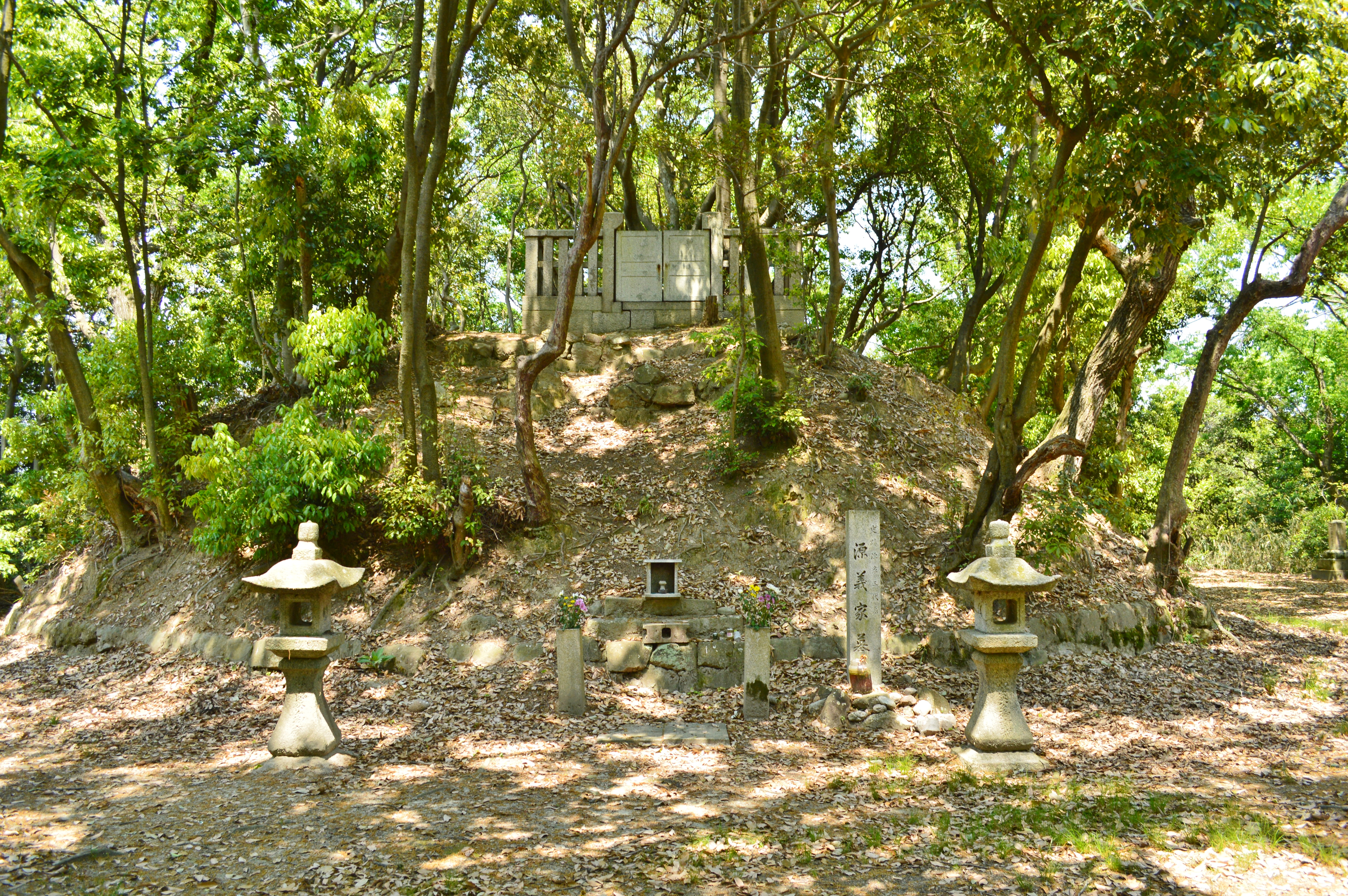
Minamoto no Yoshiie grave

== See also ==
- List of Historic Sites of Japan (Osaka)
