= Tomonaga =

- Pronunciation: tomonaga (IPA)
- Gender: Male

Origin
- Origin: Japanese
- Meaning: Different meanings depending on the kanji used

Tomonaga is both a masculine Japanese given name and a Japanese surname.

== Written forms ==
Tomonaga can be written using different combinations of kanji characters. Here are some examples:

- 友永, "friend, eternity"
- 友長, "friend, long/leader"
- 知永, "know, eternity"
- 知長, "know, long/leader"
- 智永, "intellect, eternity"
- 智長, "intellect, long/leader"
- 共永, "together, eternity"
- 共長, "together, long/leader"
- 朋永, "companion, eternity"
- 朋長, "companion, extend"
- 朝永, "morning/dynasty, eternity"
- 朝長, "morning/dynasty, long/leader"

The name can also be written in hiragana ともなが or katakana トモナガ.

== Notable people with the given name Tomonaga ==
- Tomonaga Minamoto (源 朝長; 1144–1160), Japanese samurai

== Notable people with the surname Tomonaga ==
- Jacobo Kyushei Tomonaga (朝長 五郎兵衛; 1582–1633), Gorōbyōe Tomonaga, Japanese priest in the Dominican Order of the Catholic Church
- Natsumi Tomonaga (朝長 なつ美; born 1991), Japanese modern pentathlete
- Shin'ichirō Tomonaga (朝永 振一郎; 1906–1979), Japanese physicist
