= Seigan-ji (Atsuta-ku, Nagoya) =

Coordinates: 35.1268°N 136.9062°E

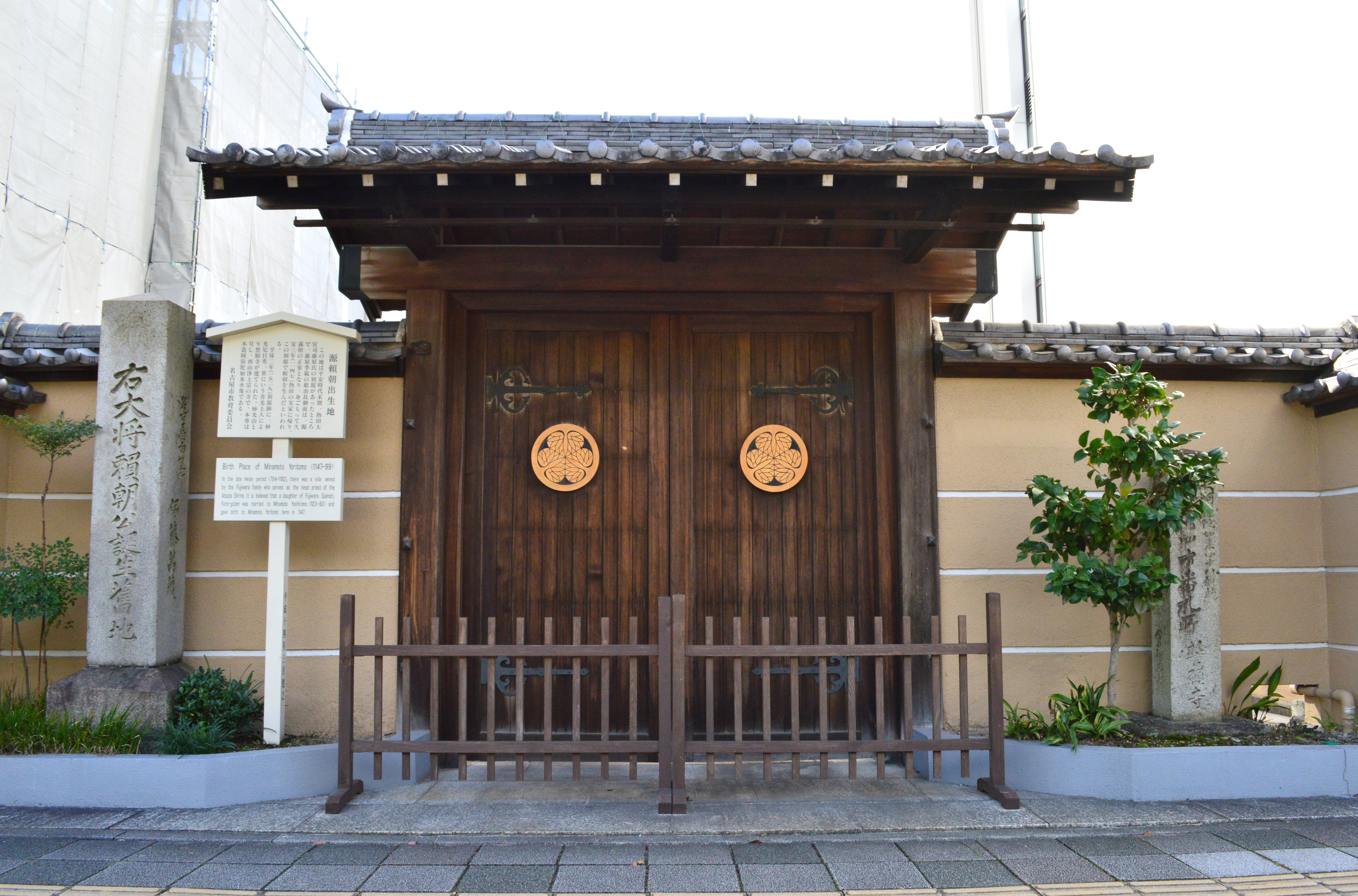
Gate of Seigan-ji

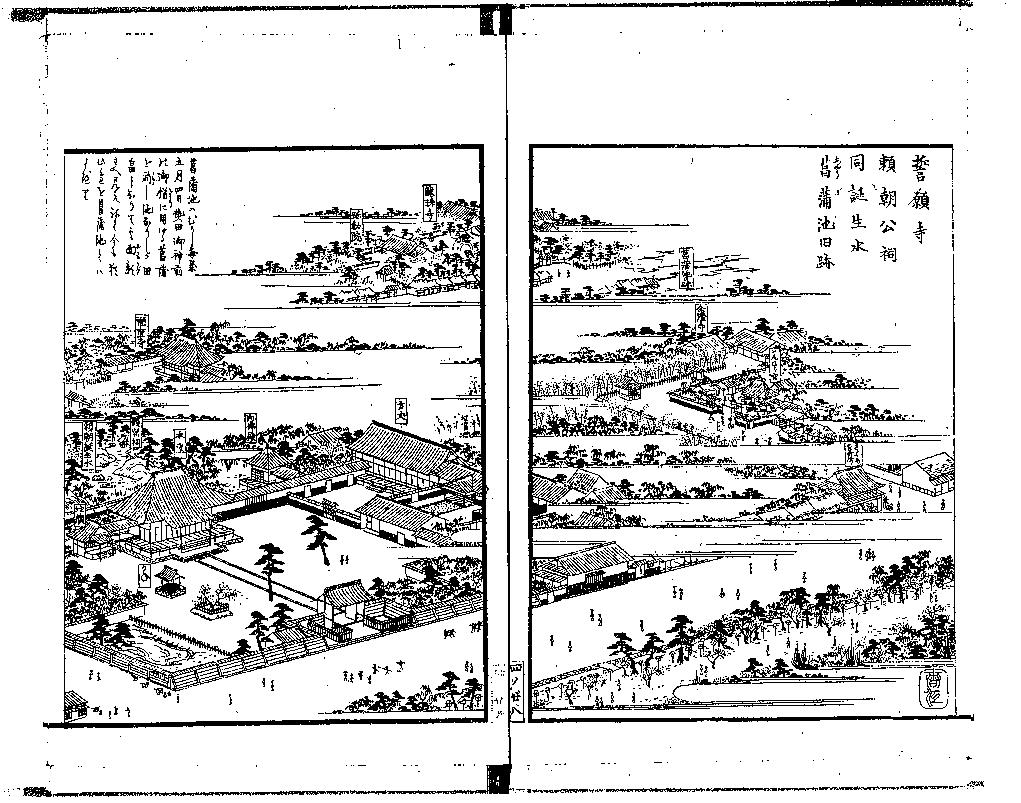
View of Seigan-ji during the Edo period (from the Owari meisho zue

Seigan-ji (誓願寺) is a Buddhist temple located in Atsuta-ku, Nagoya, in central Japan. It is located on Fushimi-dōri (伏見通り), one of the main avenues of the city.

== History ==
In the late Heian period (794–1192) there was a villa owned by the Fujiwara clan. A member served as the head priest of the nearby Atsuta Shrine, one of the holiest of Japan. It is believed that Yura-Gozen, also known as Urahime, a daughter of Fujiwara no Suenori, was married to Minamoto no Yoshitomo (1123–60) and their son Minamoto no Yoritomo was born here in 1147. He later became the founder and the first shōgun of the Kamakura shogunate.

The grounds of the villa were later donated and turned into the temple, dedicated to his memory. Most of the structures were lost during the bombing of Nagoya in World War II.

== See also ==
Located next to Seigan-ji on the same avenue are:

- Fukujū-ji (福重寺), a Buddhist temple
- Suiten-gū (水天宮), a Shinto water deity shrine
