= Ishikirimaru =

Japanese sword

Ishikirimaru (石切丸, "Stone-cutter") is a Japanese tachi sword made in the 12th century during the Heian period. It has been identified as an Important Art Object (重要美術品, jūyō bijutsuhin) of Japan, and since 2018 has been owned by the Ishikiri-Tsurugiya Shrine in East Osaka. There exist several swords of the same name. This article concerns the Ishikirimaru currently in the possession of the Ishikiri-Tsurugiya Shrine.

== Overview ==
Ishikirimaru was forged by a swordsmith from the Heian period. A signature, 有成 (yūsei) was inscribed onto the sword, but the exact swordsmith cannot be identified as there is almost no record of the legacies of Yūsei. There have been various hypotheses regarding the identity of Ishikirimaru's swordsmith. Suekane Toshihiko, the chief research member of the Kyoto National Museum, suggests Yūsei to be one of the Kawachi swordsmiths (河内鍛冶, kawachi kaji). As its overall shape (姿, sugata) is similar to ancient Yamashiro swords (山城刀, yamashirogatana), Suekane further declares Ishikirimaru to be related to Sanjō Munechika (三条宗近) and the greater school of Sanjō (三条派, sanjōha). This hypothesis is supported by Honma Junji, an authority in the study of ancient Japanese swords, who praises Ishikirimaru's quality and worksmanship, and agrees that it resembles the works of Sanjō Munechika's faction.

On top of Sanjō Munechika himself and his offsprings, scholar Tokunō Kazuo discusses the possibilities of the swordsmith being someone from the Yūsei school of Ōshū. Meanwhile, Handa Kazuo suggests the possibility of the swordsmith being from the Arikuni (有国) school.

While the origin of Ishikirimaru's name is unknown, the phrase "ishikiri" (stone-cutting) is often considered to mean, "with the divine power of the god worshipped, this blade can slash through boulders." It is a praise for the sword's remarkable strength.

Unfortunately, due to wartime fires that burnt down shrines and Shake (社家) family lands from the late Muromachi period onwards, much information was lost, including how Ishikirimaru came to be a shrine offering, its origins, and other details. According to the sayagaki (鞘書き, inscriptions on the sword mountings for identification), the blade was sharpened by polisher Hirai Chiba in 1936. It was later recognized as an Important Art Object on 22 February 1939 under the name "Tachi mei Yūsei (Saiha)".

== Anatomy ==
Ishikirimaru has a total length of 99.8cm, with a blade length (刃長, hachō) of 76.0cm. The tang (茎, nakago) is 24.2cm, the bōshi (帽子, also 鋩子, part of hamon temper line that extends to the kissaki) is 2.4cm, the tōshin sori (刀身反り, blade body curvature) is 2.6cm, the nakago-sori (茎反り, tang curvature) is 0.5cm. Its motohaba (元幅, bottom width) is 2.77cm and its sakihaba (先幅, top width) is 1.65cm. Its motogasane (元重, blade thickness) is 0.66cm, and its sakigasane (先重, thickness of the thinnest part) is 0.40cm. It weighs 740.5g. Ishikirimaru displays traces of machi-okuri (区送り, slight shortening of the blade to attain a longer tang). This indicates that its original blade length and thus total length were possibly longer.

Suekane points out the possibility of the blade having been re-tempered (再刃, saiha/saiba), a claim that is strongly endorsed by Hiroi Yūichi. However, whether or not the blade was re-tempered, it possibly became a yakemi (焼け身, blade that lost its hamon due to exposure to fire) in a fire that broke out in the shrine.

== Relationship with Minamoto no Yoshihira ==
In the Tale of Heiji, Minamoto no Yoshihira is known to carry a tachi of the same name. It is argued that Yoshihira's sword was the same tachi now kept at the Ishikiri-Tsurugiya Shrine. This is because Yūsei (the swordsmith) likely worked in the Kawachi area, which aligns with Yoshihira belonging to the Kawachi Genji clan. Ultimately, it is unknown whether these refer to the same sword, thus they are often treated as two separate swords.

== Nihontō with the Same Name ==
There was another Ishikirimaru in history, albeit with a different kanji for kiri: 石斫丸 instead of 石切丸 (same meaning). It was owned by Kawata Kagemoto, a viscount from the Tottori Domain. He purchased it from swordsmith Izuminokami Kanesada at Shinshū on his way back from an expedition to Ōshū. Later on, as Kawata was transferring the sword to Makimura Masanao, swordsmith Miyamoto Kanenori informed him that the sword would likely break easily due to its complex hamon. In a fit of rage, Kawata proceeded to strike at stone lanterns in the courtyard, splitting them into halves. This is said to have given the sword the name "Ishikirimaru". There is another sword in history also named Ishikirimaru, forged by Taguchi Hidehiro.
