= Battle of Kojima =

Battle in 1184 in Japan

- Part of the Genpei War
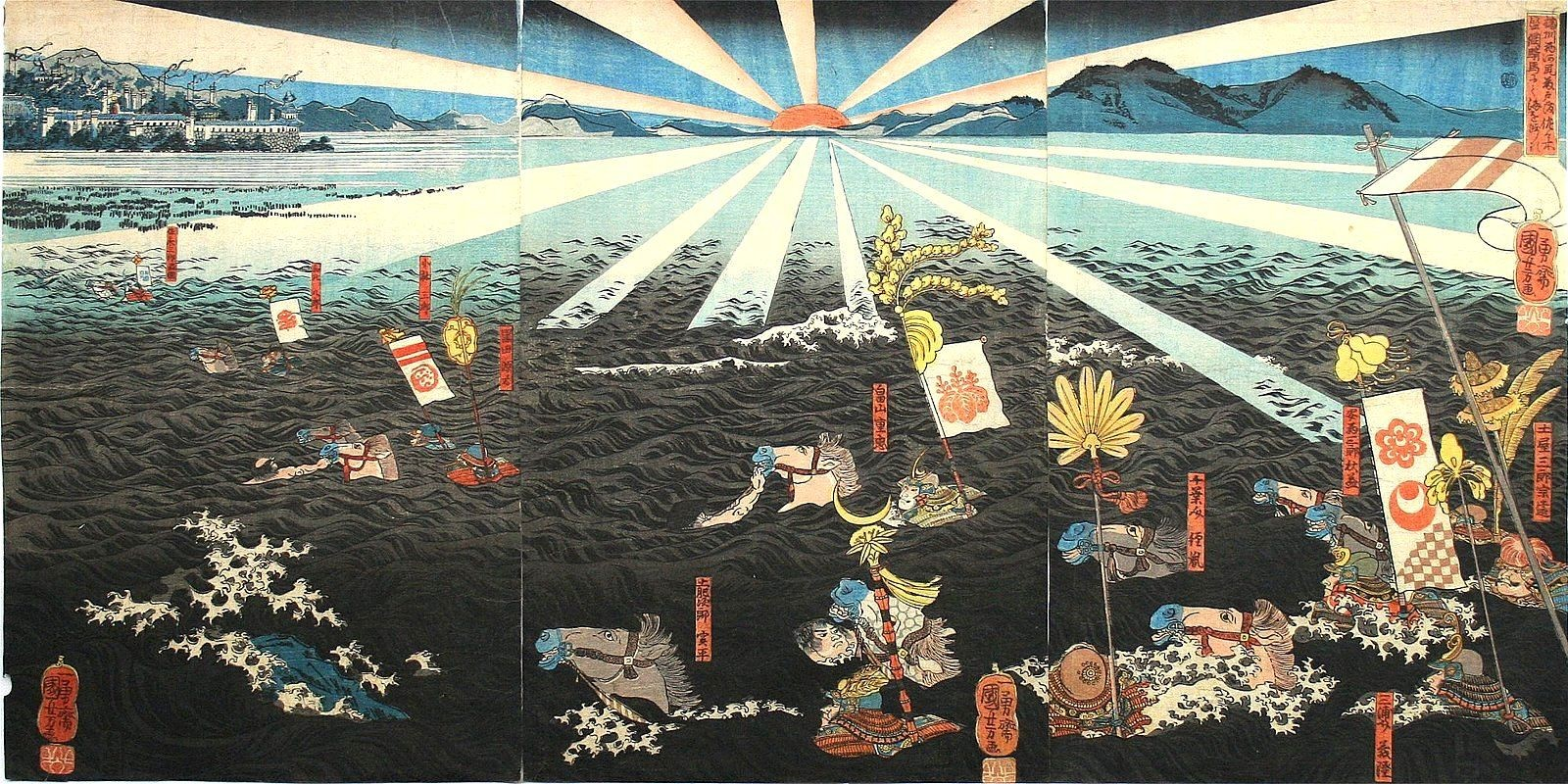
- Ukiyo-e depiction of the Battle of Fujito
Date	1184
Location	Kojima, on the coast of the Seto Inland Sea 34°33′21″N 133°47′59″E
Result	Minamoto victory

Belligerents
Minamoto clan	Taira clan

Commanders and leaders
Minamoto no Noriyori; Sasaki Moritsuna	Taira no Yukimori
- Location within Japan

The Battle of Kojima (児島合戦), also called Battle of Fujito (藤戸の戦い), was a battle of the Genpei War of the Heian period of Japanese history, and took place in 1184.

== Battle ==
In pursuit of the fleeing Taira from Ichi-no-Tani, on their way to Yashima, Minamoto no Noriyori engaged and defeated his enemies in battle at Kojima. The attack was led by Sasaki Moritsuna, who swam his horse across a narrow strait between Kojima and the mainland of Honshū.

== See also ==
- The Tale of Heike
