= Ano Zenjō =

Kamakura-period monk and political figure

- 阿野 全成
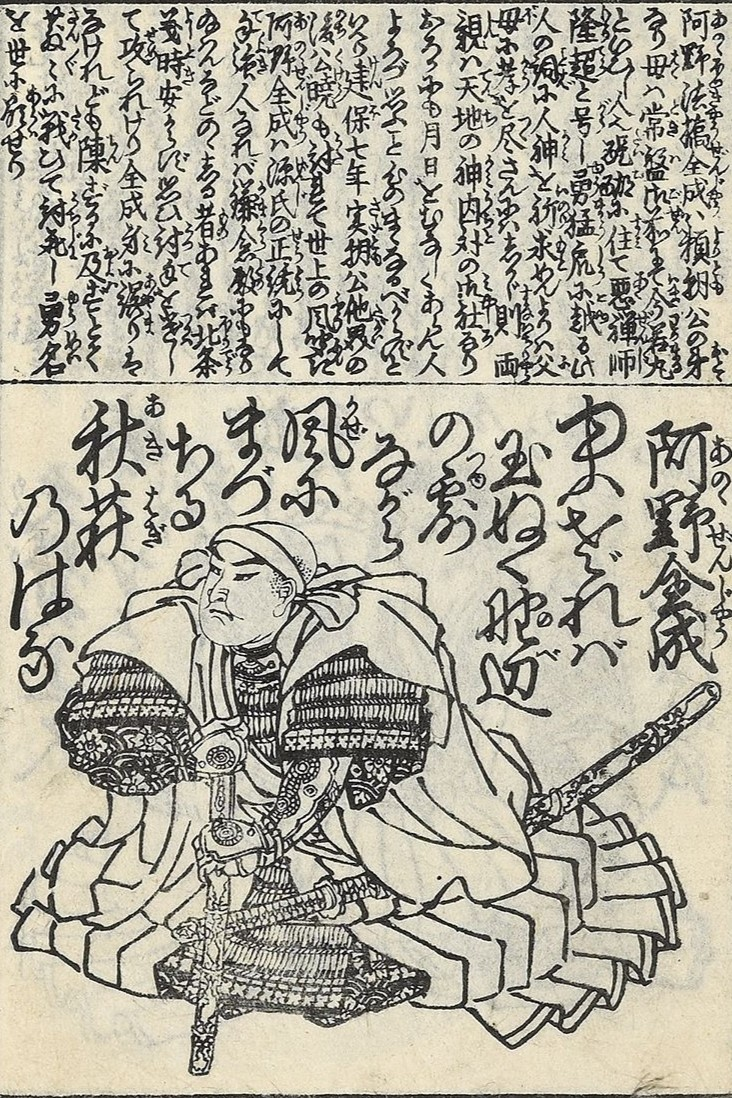
- Ano Zenjō, from Buke Hyakunin Isshu
- Born: 1153
- Died: August 1, 1203 (aged 49–50); Hitachi Province, Japan
- Spouse: Awa no Tsubone (daughter of Hōjō Tokimasa)
- Children: Ano Yorimasa, Ano Tokimoto, others
- Parents: Minamoto no Yoshitomo (father); Tokiwa Gozen (mother)

Ano Zenjō (阿野 全成, also read Ano Zensei; 1153 – August 1, 1203) was a Japanese Buddhist monk and political figure of the late Heian period and early Kamakura period. He was the seventh son of Minamoto no Yoshitomo, a younger half-brother of Minamoto no Yoritomo (the founder of the Kamakura shogunate), and an elder full brother of Minamoto no Yoshitsune. Their mother was Tokiwa Gozen. Though often overshadowed in historical narratives by his more famous brothers, Zenjō played a significant role in the founding of the Kamakura shogunate. He was the first of Yoritomo's siblings to join his cause in 1180, and recent scholarship has suggested he served as Yoritomo's representative at Izusan (Sōtōzan), one of the most powerful shrine-temple complexes in eastern Japan. He was executed in 1203 on the orders of the second shogun, Minamoto no Yoriie, amid a power struggle between the Hōjō clan and their rivals. The Ano clan takes its name from Ano-shō in Suruga Province (present-day Numazu, Shizuoka Prefecture), which was Zenjō's domain.

== Early life ==
Zenjō was born in 1153 as the seventh son of Minamoto no Yoshitomo, a prominent warrior of the Minamoto clan. His mother, Tokiwa Gozen, was famed for her beauty and also bore two other sons: Gien and Yoshitsune. In 1159, when Zenjō was seven years old, his father Yoshitomo was killed after his defeat in the Heiji Rebellion. As was customary for sons of defeated warriors, the young Zenjō was forced to take Buddhist vows and entered Daigo-ji temple in Kyoto, where he took the religious name Ryūchō (隆超), later changing it to Zenjō (全成). He was also known by the epithet Daigo Zenji (醍醐禅師, "the Zen Master of Daigo") and, according to the Heiji Monogatari, as Aku Zenji (悪禅師, "the Wicked Monk"), a title suggesting physical prowess rather than moral failing, as aku in this context connoted ferocity or toughness.

== Joining Yoritomo ==
In the 8th month of 1180, Yoritomo raised an army in response to the call to arms issued by Prince Mochihito. Zenjō secretly fled Daigo-ji temple, disguised himself as a wandering monk, and made his way east to join his half-brother.

On the 26th day of the 8th month, shortly after Yoritomo's defeat at the Battle of Ishibashiyama, Zenjō encountered Sasaki Sadatsuna and his brothers and took refuge with them in Shibuya-no-shō in Sagami Province. On the 1st day of the 10th month, Zenjō met Yoritomo at a lodging in Saginuma in Shimōsa Province. This was the first reunion of any of Yoritomo's brothers, and according to the Azuma Kagami, Yoritomo wept with joy at Zenjō's loyalty.

== Marriage and political position ==
Having earned Yoritomo's trust, Zenjō was granted Nagao-ji temple in Musashi Province (present-day Myōraku-ji in Tama Ward, Kawasaki). He married Awa no Tsubone, a younger sister of Yoritomo's wife Hōjō Masako and a daughter of Hōjō Tokimasa. He was also granted the domain of Ano-shō in Sunto County, Suruga Province (present-day Numazu, Shizuoka Prefecture), from which the Ano clan took its name.

In 1192, Awa no Tsubone was appointed wet nurse (menoto) to Yoritomo's second son Senman (later Sanetomo). The Hakone Jinja Taikei (箱根神社大系, 1930), compiled by the Hakone Shrine Office, records Zenjō under the title "Ano Kazusa" (阿野上総), referring to him by his court title as vice-governor (suke) of Kazusa Province rather than by his personal name, and notes "阿野上総妻室（阿波局）為御乳"—that his wife Awa-no-Tsubone served as wet nurse to the shogunal family. Kazusa was a shinnō-ningoku (親王任国), a province whose nominal governorship was reserved for an imperial prince; in such provinces the suke served as the highest effective official, ranking above the governors of ordinary provinces. Holding this title indicates that Zenjō was recognized as a gokenin (御家人)—a direct vassal of the shogun bound by a personal relationship of loyalty and protection—and not merely as a Buddhist monk.

== Political role ==
Despite being given the epithet "Wicked Monk," Zenjō does not appear in the Azuma Kagami as a participant in any of the major military campaigns of the Genpei War. After 1181, he is mentioned only twice in Yoritomo's lifetime — in entries from 1185 and 1192 — and both references are incidental, relating to his son-in-law Fujiwara no Kimisuke and his wife Awa no Tsubone respectively. However, a passage in the Gyokuyō (the diary of the court noble Kujō Kanezane) dated the 6th day of the 11th month of Juei 2 (1183) records that Ichijō Yoshiyasu, Yoritomo's brother-in-law who had fled to Kamakura, was lodged at Zenjō's residence, which was located approximately one chō (about 109 meters) from Yoritomo's own dwelling. This suggests Zenjō held a position of some importance within Yoritomo's inner circle.

=== Recent scholarship: Izusan documents ===
Kazuki Takahashi, professor at Meiji University, has analyzed a document preserved among the Izusan Jinja Komonjo-utsushi (copies of old documents from Izusan Shrine, transcribed in the early Shōwa period). The document, dated the 25th day of the 7th month of Jishō 7 (1183), is a donation record (kishinjo) for the Jōgyō-dō hall at Sōtōzan (the Buddhist temple complex at Izusan), signed with the title "zasu" (seat-master, i.e. head priest). Takahashi has identified the kaō (stylized signature) on this document as matching that of Ano Zenjō, concluding that Zenjō served as the zasu of Sōtōzan and issued this document as Yoritomo's representative. The document uses the year designation "Jishō 7" rather than the Kyoto court's "Juei 2," which Takahashi interprets as reflecting Yoritomo's deliberate use of an alternative calendar to assert political independence. A special exhibition at the Izusan Local History Museum displayed the donation record, noting that an endorsement on the reverse reads "Ano Hokkyō Gobō" (阿野法橋御房), identifying the issuer as Zenjō.

== Downfall and death ==
After Yoritomo's death in 1199, his eldest son Yoriie succeeded as head of the Kamakura shogunate. Zenjō, as the father-in-law of Sanetomo (Yoritomo's second son) through his wife Awa no Tsubone, aligned with his father-in-law Hōjō Tokimasa in supporting Sanetomo's claim. This brought him into direct conflict with Yoriie's faction. On the 19th day of the 5th month of Kennin 3 (1203), Yoriie struck first. He dispatched Takeda Nobumitsu to arrest Zenjō on charges of treason. Zenjō was seized and confined in the shogunal residence. On the 25th day, he was banished to Hitachi Province. On the 23rd day of the 6th month, Zenjō was executed on Yoriie's orders by Hatta Tomoie. He was 51 years old. On the 16th day of the 7th month, Zenjō's third son, Harima-no-kimi Yorimasa (播磨公頼全), was also killed in Kyoto by agents sent by Minamoto no Nakakira and Sasaki Sadatsuna.

== Graves and memorials ==
Daisen-ji temple (大泉寺), Numazu City, Shizuoka Prefecture: Graves of Zenjō and his son Tokimoto, designated as a municipal historic site. Dairokuten-no-mori (大六天の森), Mashiko, Tochigi Prefecture: Two gorintō (five-ring stone towers), said to mark the graves of Zenjō and an attendant, at the site believed to be near where he was executed. These are maintained by local residents and recognized as a Mashiko Town "community heritage."

== Descendants and family documents ==
The Watanabe family of Hara-juku (原宿渡邉家), Numazu City, traces its descent from Zenjō. A stone marker erected by the city at the Hara-juku Honjin Site (原宿本陣跡) notes this lineage. The family line passed the name Watanabe Hachirōzaemon (渡邉八郎左衛門) down through successive eldest sons, and approximately 3,200 documents related to the Watanabe family are extant. The collection includes a family genealogy listing Minamoto no Yoshitomo, Yoritomo, Noriyori, Ano Zenjō, Yoshitsune, Tokimoto, Hōjō Tokimasa, and Masako, a copy of a vermilion-seal letter (shuinjō) issued by Imagawa Yoshimoto in 1548 (Tenbun 17), and a copy of a vermilion-seal letter from the Takeda clan in 1578 (Tenshō 6), a Sengoku-period document.
