= Seated Portrait of Minamoto no Yoritomo =

Seated Portrait of Minamoto no Yoritomo (Presumed)
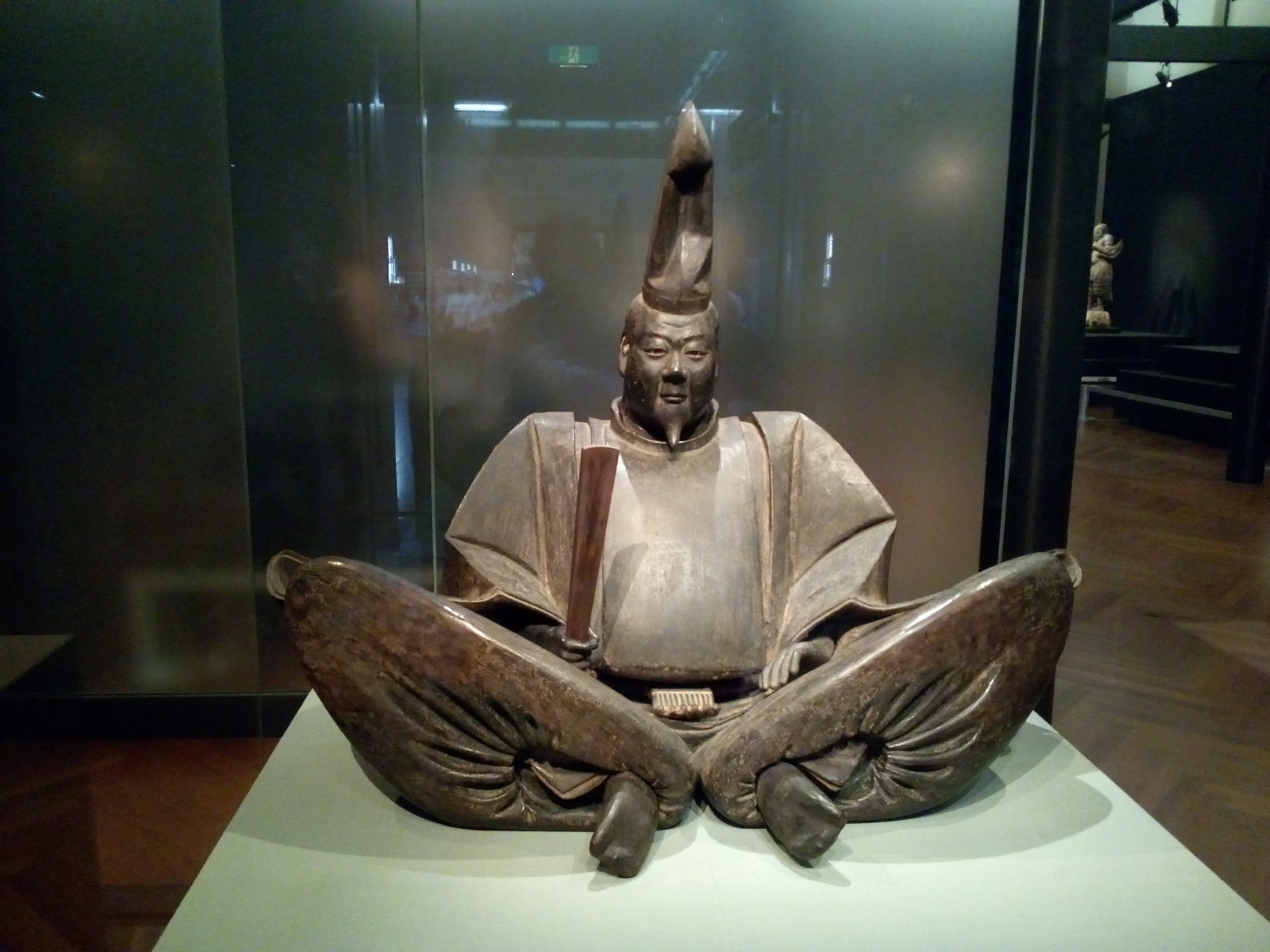
- Artist: Unknown
- Year: 13-14th century
- Catalogue: C-1526 (TNM catalogue)
- Type: Wooden sculpture, polychromy and inlaid crystal eyes
- Dimensions: 70.5 cm (27.8 in)
- Designation: Important Cultural Property
- Location: Tokyo National Museum, Tokyo, Japan

Seated Portrait of Minamoto no Yoritomo (伝源頼朝坐像) is an anonymous wooden sculpture from the 13th or 14th centuries presumably depicting Minamoto no Yoritomo, now part of the collection of the Tokyo National Museum.

Minamoto no Yoritomo (1147–1199) was the founder and the first shōgun of the Kamakura Shogunate of Japan. He ruled from 1192 until 1199. It is generally agreed that the sculpture might be an image of him, but this attribution is not completely certain.

Dated from the Kamakura period (1185-1333), it is believed that this sculpture was enshrined in the Tsurugaoka Hachimangū Shinto shrine in Kamakura, a place of worship strongly linked to the Minamoto family. It is also said that when Toyotomi Hideyoshi visited the shrine, he talked to the sculpture of Yoritomo while patting it on its shoulder.

Two other very similar sculptures are preserved in Kamakura, an image of Hōjō Tokiyori at Kenchō-ji, and an image of Uesugi Shigefusa at Meigetsu-in. The style of these sculptures probably followed the popular portraits of court nobles in their "starched stiff clothing" and cross-legged position. The portrait of Yoritomo seems to have been created some time after the other two, probably close to a century after Yoritomo's death.

A smaller-than-life portrait, with a height of about 70 cm from the bottom to the top of the eboshi, the typical headgear used by court nobles, it has been praised for its "solemnity" and for "showing the noble dignity of the head of a warrior family". It is designated an Important Cultural Property.

It is now part of the collection of the Tokyo National Museum in Tokyo, where it is kept and exhibited occasionally. The last time it was on display was from July 25 to October 22, 2017, in Room 11 of the Honkan (Japanese Gallery).
