= Tokiwa Gozen =

Japanese noblewoman of the late Heian period (1138 – c. 1180)

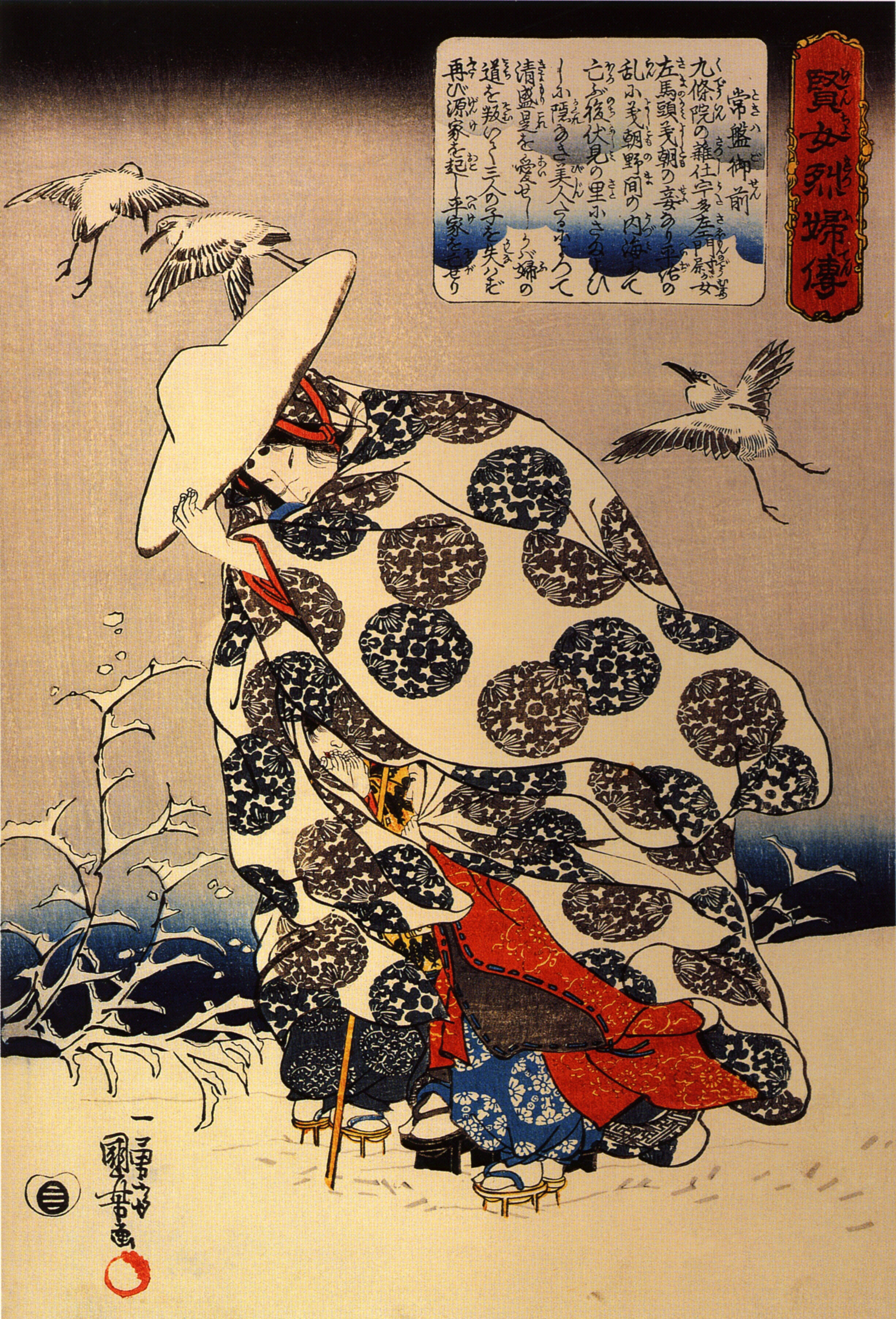
Tokiwa Gozen fleeing through the snow with her young sons; 19th-century woodblock print by Utagawa Kuniyoshi

Tokiwa Gozen (常盤御前) (1138 – c. 1180), or Lady Tokiwa, was a Japanese noblewoman of the late Heian period and mother of the great samurai general Minamoto no Yoshitsune. Sources disagree as to whether she was a concubine or wife to Minamoto no Yoshitomo, of which she bore Minamoto no Yoshitsune. She was later captured by Taira no Kiyomori, but escaped.

After leaving Kiyomori, Tokiwa married Fujiwara no Naganari. She had children with him.

Lady Tokiwa is primarily associated, in literature and art, with an incident in which she fled through the snow, protecting her young sons with her robes, during the Heiji Rebellion in 1160.

She is also known as Hotoke Gozen, or Lady Buddha.
