= Minamoto no Yoritomo =

Japanese Samurai, Daimyo and Military ruler of Japan from 1192 to 1199

- 源 頼朝
- Portrait by Fujiwara no Takanobu, 1179

Shōgun
- In office July 12, 1192 – February 9, 1199
- Monarchs: Go-Toba; Tsuchimikado
- Preceded by: Shogunate established
- Succeeded by: Minamoto no Yoriie

Head of the Kawachi Genji (Minamoto clan)
- Preceded by: Minamoto no Yoshitomo
- Succeeded by: Minamoto no Yoriie

Personal details
- Born: May 9, 1147 Atsuta, Owari Province
- Died: February 9, 1199 (aged 51) Kamakura, Kamakura shogunate
- Spouse: Hōjō Masako
- Relations: Kame no Mae (concubine); Daishin no Tsubone (concubine)
- Children: Minamoto no Yoriie; Minamoto no Sanetomo; Shimazu Tadahisa (disputed); Ōhime
- Parents: Minamoto no Yoshitomo (father); Yura Gozen (mother)
- Relatives: Fujiwara no Suenori (grandfather); Minamoto no Yoshihira (half-brother); Minamoto no Tomonaga (half-brother); Minamoto no Yoshikado (Brother); Minamoto no Mareyoshi (brother); Bomonhime (sister); Minamoto no Noriyori (half-brother); Ano Zenjō (half-brother); Yoshien (half-brother); Minamoto no Yoshitsune (half-brother); Minamoto no Yoshinaka (cousin)
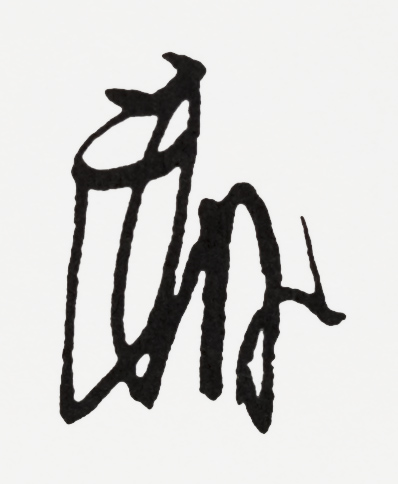
- Signature

Military service
- Allegiance: Emperor of Japan
- Rank: Commander-in-Chief
- Battles/wars: Genpei war (1180 - 1185)

Minamoto no Yoritomo (源 頼朝; Japanese pronunciation: [mʲì.nä́.mó̞.tó̞ nó̞ | jò̞.ɾʲí.tó̞.mó̞, -nó̞ jó̞-]; May 9, 1147 – February 9, 1199) was a samurai, daimyo and the founder and the first shogun of the Kamakura shogunate, ruling from 1192 until 1199, also the first shogun in the history of Japan to hold de-facto power over Japan. He was married to Hōjō Masako, who acted as regent (shikken) after his death.

Yoritomo was the son of Minamoto no Yoshitomo and belonged to Seiwa Genji's prestigious Kawachi Genji family. After successfully maneuvering himself to the position of rightful heir of the Minamoto clan, he led his clan against the Taira from his capital in Kamakura, beginning the Genpei War in 1180. After five years of civil war, the Minamoto clan finally defeated the Taira in the Battle of Dan-no-ura in 1185. Yoritomo established the supremacy of the samurai caste and the first shogunate (bakufu) which was to be centered around Kamakura, thus beginning the feudal age in Japan, which lasted until the 19th century.

== Early life ==
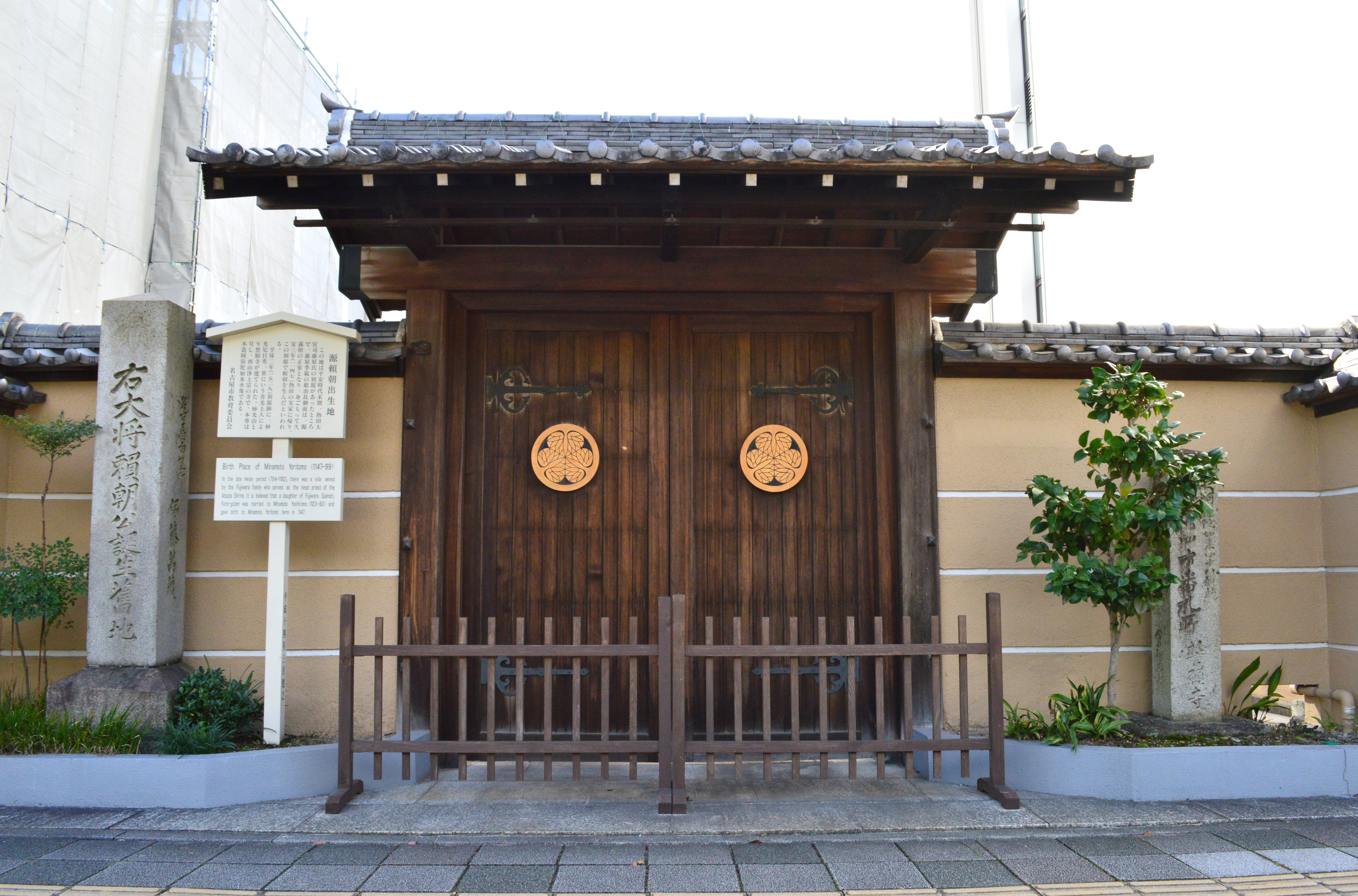
Gate of Seigan-ji in Nagoya, the site of the former family villa and his birthplace

Yoritomo was the third son of Minamoto no Yoshitomo and his official wife, Yura-Gozen, daughter of Fujiwara no Suenori, High Priest of Atsuta Shrine and a member of the powerful Fujiwara clan. Yoritomo was born in the family villa, on the western side of Atsuta Shrine, in Atsuta, Nagoya, Owari Province (present-day Seigan-ji). At the time, his grandfather Minamoto no Tameyoshi was the head of the Minamoto clan. His childhood name was Onitakemaru (鬼武丸). He was a descendant of Emperor Seiwa.

In 1156, factional divisions in the court erupted into open warfare within the capital. The cloistered Emperor Toba and his son Emperor Go-Shirakawa sided with the son of Fujiwara regent Fujiwara no Tadazane, Fujiwara no Tadamichi as well as Taira no Kiyomori (heir of the Taira clan at the time), while Cloistered Emperor Sutoku sided with Tadazane's younger son, Fujiwara no Yorinaga. This is known as the Hōgen Rebellion.

The Minamoto clan were split. The head of the clan, Tameyoshi, sided with Sutoku. However, his son, Yoshitomo (father of Yoritomo), sided with Toba and Go-Shirakawa, as well as Kiyomori. In the end, the supporters of Go-Shirakawa won the civil war, thus ensuring victory for Yoshitomo and Kiyomori. Sutoku was placed under house arrest, and Yorinaga was fatally wounded in battle. Tameyoshi was executed by the forces of Yoshitomo. Nonetheless, Go-Shirakawa and Kiyomori were ruthless, and Yoshitomo found himself as the head of the Minamoto clan, while Yoritomo became the heir.

Yoritomo and the Minamoto clan descended from the imperial family on his father's side. Nonetheless, in Kyoto, the Taira clan, now under the leadership of Kiyomori, and the Minamoto clan, under the leadership of Yoshitomo, began to factionalize again.

Four years later, Fujiwara no Nobuyori made request for a greater position in the government, Ex-Emperor Go-Shirakawa denied the request under the advice of the Taira backed Fujiwara no Michinori (Also known as Shinzei). This led to Nobuyori joining forces with Yoshitomo and the Minamoto clan to prepare for a coup d'état. This would spark the conflict known as the Heiji rebellion.

In December 1159, Kiyomori left Heian-kyō on a pilgrimage. Seeing an opportunity, Minamoto gathered hundreds of men, attacked Sanjō Palace, and kidnapped Ex-Emperor Go-Shirakawa and current Emperor Nijō. Next the Minamoto attacked Shinzei's mansion. Shinzei was able to escape, but was captured and decapitated shortly thereafter. Kiyomori returned, freed both the retired and current Emperor, and defeated the Minamoto at the Battle at Rokuhara. Yoshitomo fled the capital but was later betrayed and executed by a retainer.

Only Yoritomo and his younger brothers were spared on account of their young age, though they were exiled to temples to become monks. Taira no Kiyomori and the Taira clan were now the undisputed leaders of Japan.

Yoritomo grew up in exile. He married into the Hōjō clan, led by Hōjō Tokimasa, marrying Tokimasa's daughter, Hōjō Masako. Meanwhile, he was notified of events in Kyoto.

== Family ==
Parents

- Father: Minamoto no Yoshitomo (1123 – February 11, 1160)
- Mother: Yura Gozen (由良御前, d. 1159), daughter of Fujiwara no Suenori

Consorts and issues

- Possible Wife: Yaehime (八重姫), daughter of Itō Sukechika
  - Chizurumaru (千鶴丸), possible first son
- Wife: Hōjō Masako (1156 – August 16, 1225), daughter of Hōjō Tokimasa
  - Ohime (大姫, 1178 – August 28, 1197), Fiance of Minamoto no Yoshitaka (源 義高), first daughter
  - Minamoto no Yoriie (September 11, 1182 – August 14, 1204), first son
  - Lady Mihata (三幡, 1186 – July 24, 1199), second daughter
  - Minamoto no Sanetomo (September 12, 1192 – February 12, 1219, r. 1203–1219), third son
- Concubine: Kame no Mae (亀の前)
- Concubine: Daishin no Tsubone (大進局), daughter of Date Tomomune (伊達朝宗)
  - Jōgyō (貞暁, March 18, 1186 – May 27, 1231), also known as Kamamura Hōin (鎌倉法印), second son

== Call to arms and the Genpei War (1180–1185) ==
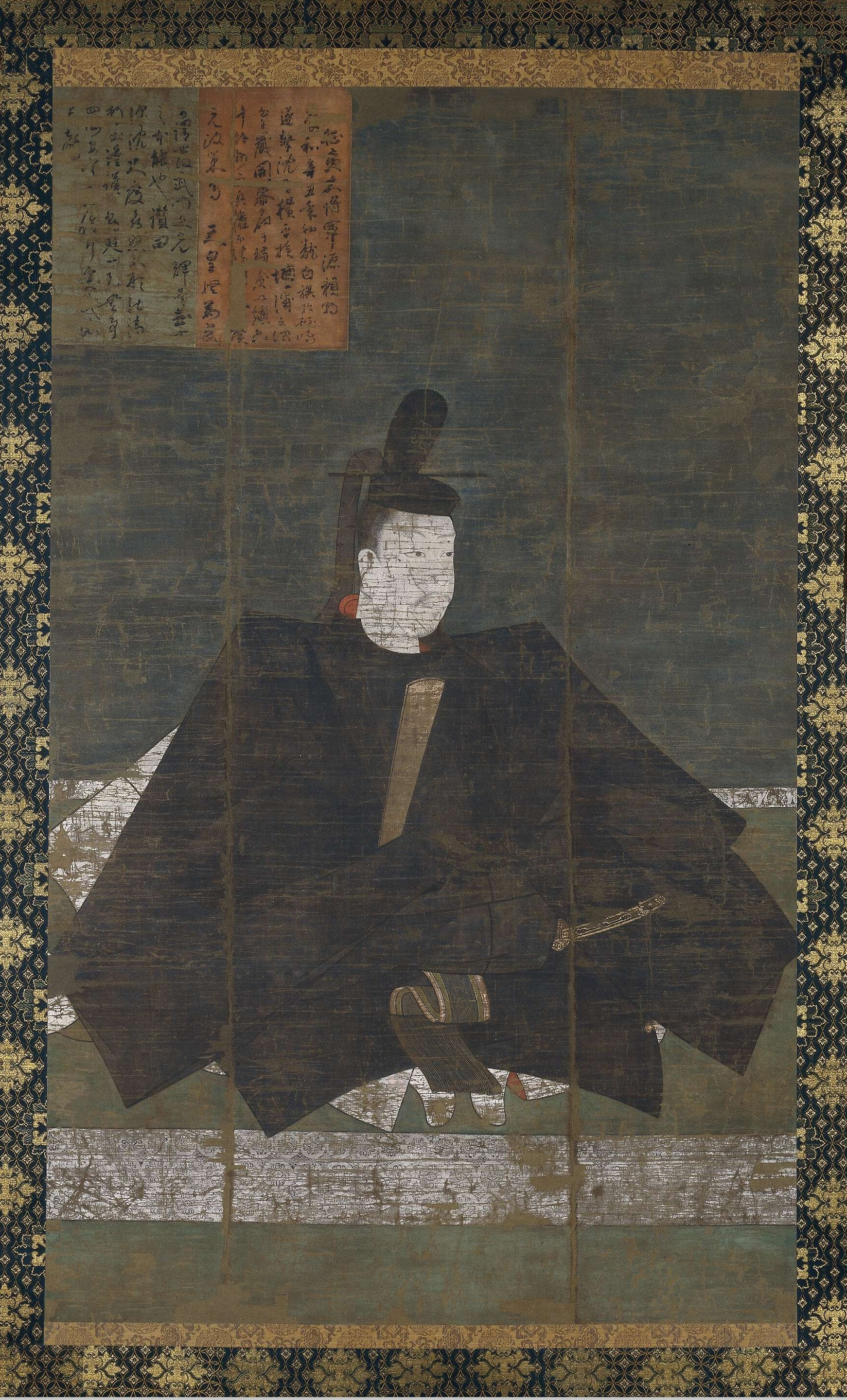
Minamoto no Yoritomo scroll painting, late 14th century

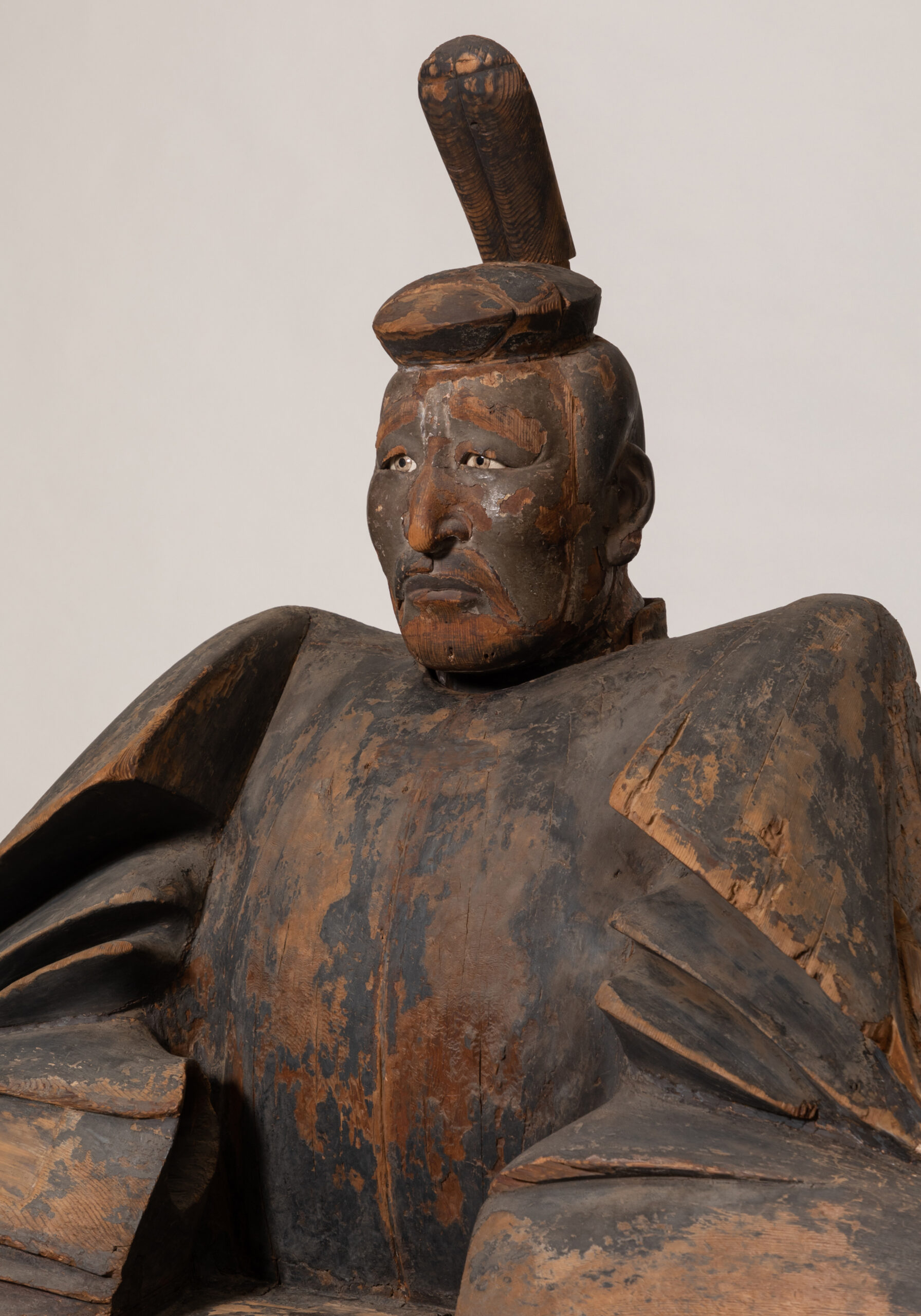
Seated wooden statue of Yoritomo owned by Kai Zenkō-ji.

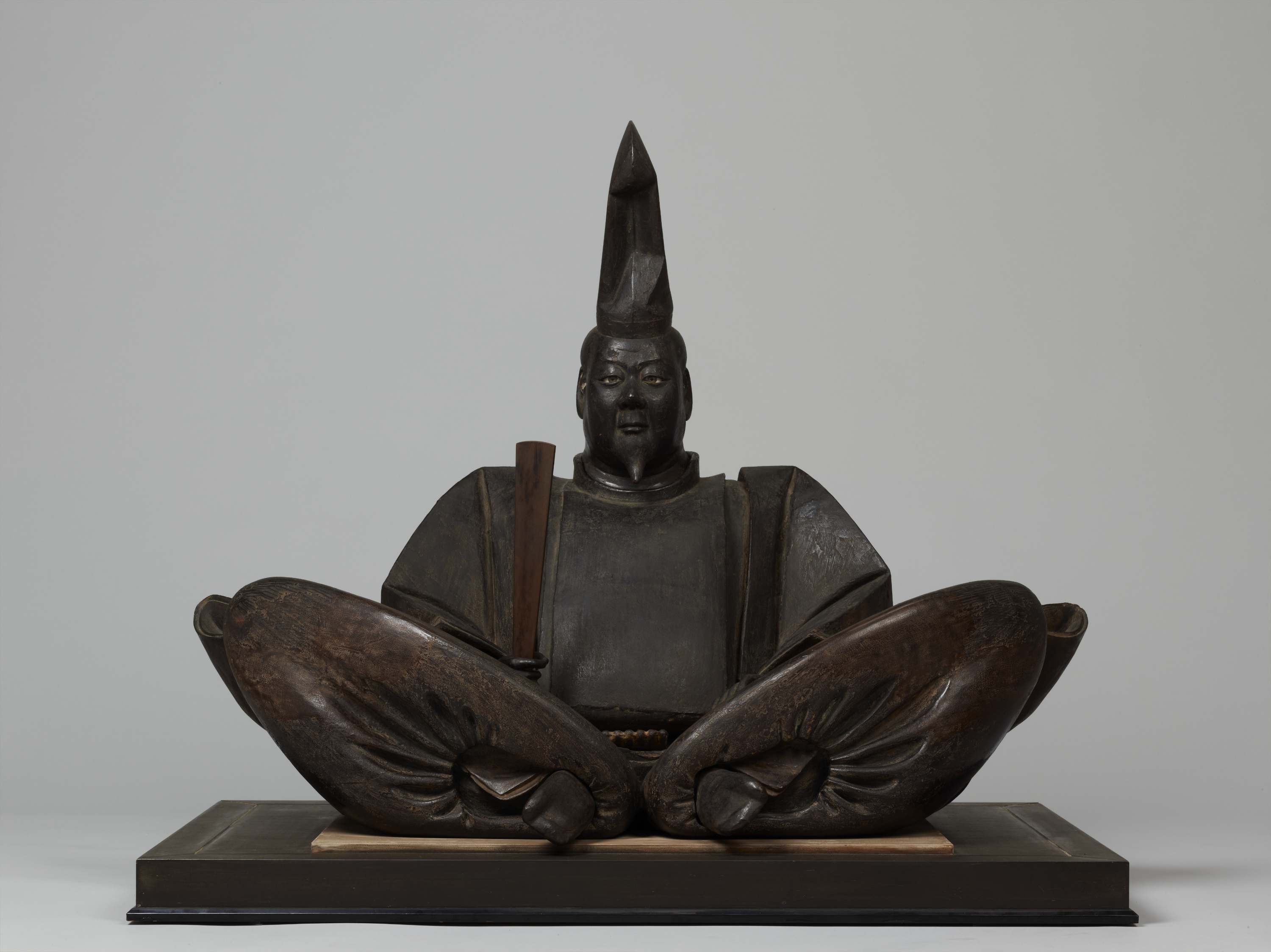
Seated wooden statue of Minamoto no Yoritomo in Tokyo National Museum.

In 1180, Prince Mochihito, a son of Cloistered Emperor Go-Shirakawa, made a national call to arms of the Minamoto clan all over Japan to rebel against the Taira. Yoritomo took part in this, especially after tensions escalated between the Taira and Minamoto after the death of Minamoto no Yorimasa and Prince Mochihito himself.

Yoritomo established himself as the rightful heir of the Minamoto clan and set up a capital in Kamakura to the east. Not all Minamoto thought of Yoritomo as rightful heir, however. His uncle, Minamoto no Yukiie, and his cousin Minamoto no Yoshinaka, conspired against him.

In September 1180, Yoritomo was defeated at the Battle of Ishibashiyama, his first major battle, when Ōba Kagechika led a rapid night attack. After his defeat in Mt. Ishibashiyama, Minamoto no Yoritomo fled into the Hakone mountains, stayed in Yugawara, then escaped from Manazuru-Iwa to Awa (south of present-day Chiba). Yoritomo spent the next six months raising a new army.

Taira no Kiyomori died in 1181 and the Taira clan was now led by Taira no Munemori. Munemori took a much more aggressive policy against the Minamoto and attacked Minamoto bases from Kyoto in the Genpei War. Nonetheless, Yoritomo was well protected in Kamakura.

His brothers Minamoto no Yoshitsune and Minamoto no Noriyori defeated the Taira in several battles, but they could not stop Minamoto no Yoshinaka, Yoritomo's rival, from entering Kyoto in 1183 and chasing the Taira south. The Taira took Emperor Antoku with them. In 1184, the Minamoto replaced Antoku with Emperor Go-Toba.

From 1181 to 1184, a de facto truce with the Taira-dominated court allowed Yoritomo the time to build an administration of his own, centered on his military headquarters in Kamakura. In the end he triumphed over his rival cousins, who sought to steal control of the clan from him, and over the Taira, who suffered a terrible defeat at the Battle of Dan-no-ura in 1185. Yoritomo established the supremacy of the samurai caste and the first shogunate (bakufu) at Kamakura, thus beginning the feudal age in Japan, which lasted until the 17th century.

== Later years and death ==
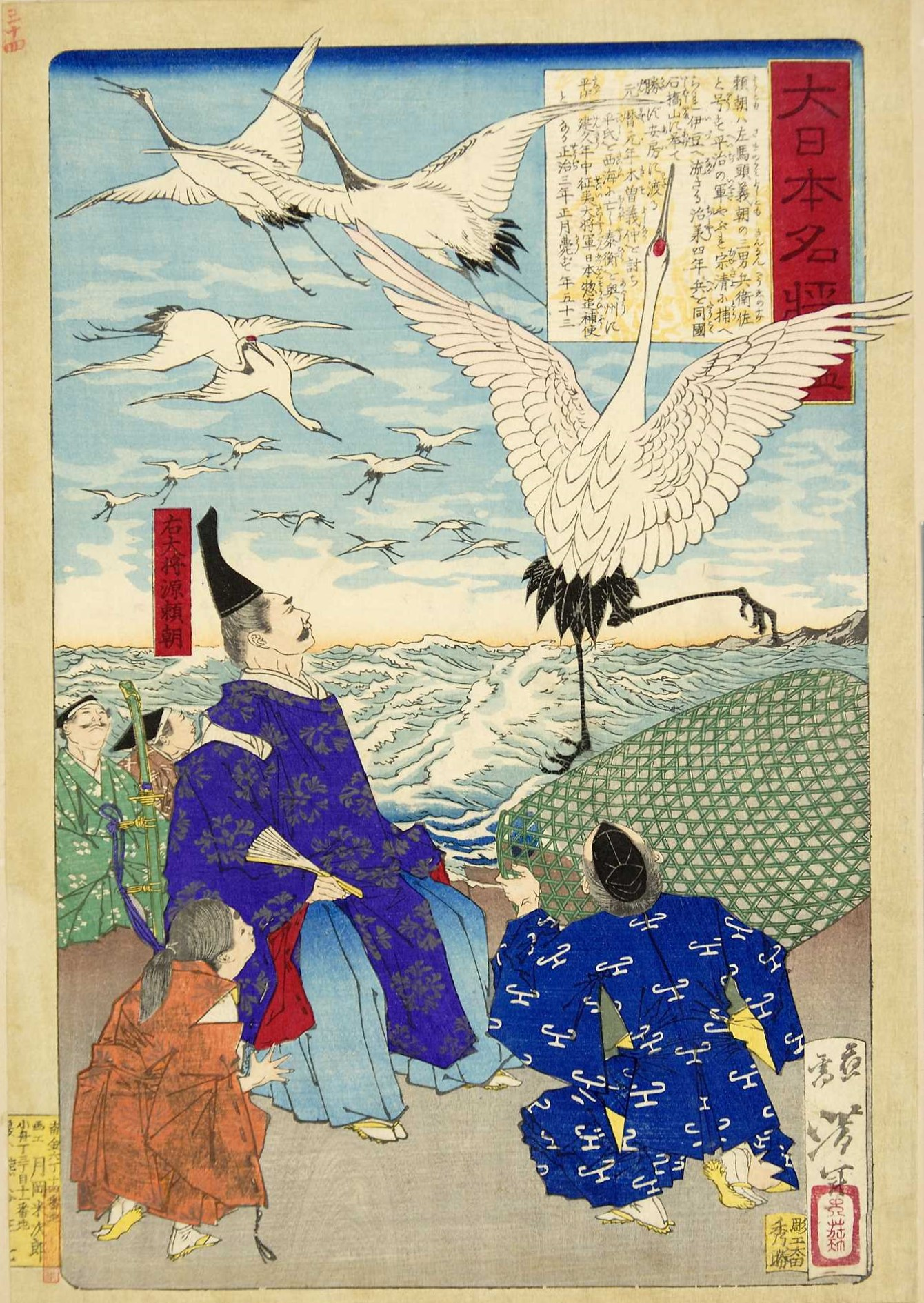
An ukiyo-e by Yoshitoshi depicting Yoritomo and his retainers releasing cranes to mourn for the war dead in the Mutsu and Dewa Conquest

As he rose to a position of power, Yoritomo began to defy and undermine the authority of Emperor Go-Shirakawa by appointing his own jitō (district stewards) and shugo (constables), thus eroding the central government's local administrative power.

In the summer of 1189, Yoritomo invaded and subjugated the northern provinces of Mutsu and Dewa, razing the northern Fujiwara capital of Hiraizumi. The city rivaled Kyoto in population, size and splendor and was located near Japan's only significant gold mines. In December 1190 Yoritomo took up residence in his Rokuhara mansion at the capital, the former headquarters of the Taira clan. When his old rival, Emperor Go-Shirakawa died in the spring of 1192, there was no longer anyone standing in the way of his ultimate ambition. Thus, Yoritomo gave himself the title of Sei-i Tai Shōgun (Barbarian-quelling Generalissimo) which formally placed all the feudal lords and both the jitō and shugo under his direct control. Thus creating a new feudal state organized around Kamakura while Kyoto was relegated to the role of "national ceremony and ritual".

Yoritomo gathered his gokenin in May 1193 and arranged a grand hunting event, Fuji no Makigari. On May 16, Yoritomo's 12-year-old son Yoriie shot a deer for the first time. Hunting was stopped and a festival was held in the evening. Yoritomo rejoiced in his son's achievement and sent a messenger to his wife Masako, but Masako sent the messenger back, saying that a military commander's son being able to shoot a deer is nothing to celebrate.

The Revenge of the Soga Brothers took place on May 28 of the same year at the Fuji no Makigari hunting event. The brothers Soga Sukenari and Soga Tokimune murdered the killer of their father, Kudō Suketsune. The brothers managed to kill 10 other participants until Nitta Tadatsune killed Sukenari. Then, Tokimune raided Yoritomo's mansion attempting to attack Yoritomo, but was finally taken down by Gosho no Gorōmaru, thus saving Yoritomo from a possible assassination attempt and ending the massacre. After this, Yoritomo took Tokimune in for questioning and had him executed later.

Yoritomo was ordained as a Buddhist monk in 1199 and left his home. He received the Buddhist name Bukōshōgendaizenmon (武皇嘯厚大禅門). He died two days later at the age of 51.

== Appearance and personality ==
According to The Tale of Heiji, Yoritomo was "more adult-like than others of his age", and the figure of a young warrior Yoritomo appears in the picture scroll of The Tale of Heiji. Genpei Jōsuiki describes Yoritomo saying "his face is large and appearance is beautiful." The imperial messenger Nakahara no Yasusada, who met Yoritomo in Kamakura in August 1183, said that "he is short and his face is large, his appearance is graceful and language is civilized."

Kujō Kanezane writes in his diary Tamaha that "Yoritomo's body is of rigorous power, and his fierce nature is accompanied with a clear distinction and firm resolution of the judgement of right and wrong." Yoritomo practiced shudō with Yoshinao, a member of the Imperial Guard.

Historian Hideo Kuroda organized and examined the portraits and statues of Minamoto no Yoritomo and has concluded as follows. When comparing the statues of Minamoto no Yoritomo in Higashihirozo and Hōjō Tokiyori in Kenchō-ji, from the facial expression to size, they are almost identical, and there is evidence that the kariginu was remodeled into a sokutai, the formal dress of the shogun, by adding a hirao and sekitai. Kuroda argues that the statue was originally a statue of Hōjō Tokiyori sculpted in Kamakura in the 14th century, but after the original statue of Yoritomo was lost, an altered statue of Tokiyori was used as a replacement. On the other hand, he considers the inscription on the statue of Minamoto no Yoritomo in Kai Province, Zenkō-ji to be the name of the repairer instead of the name of the sculptor, and that it was made at the request of Hōjō Masako in the first quarter of the 13th century. Thus, Kuroda concludes that this statue is the only accurate depiction of Minamoto no Yoritomo.

== Legacy ==
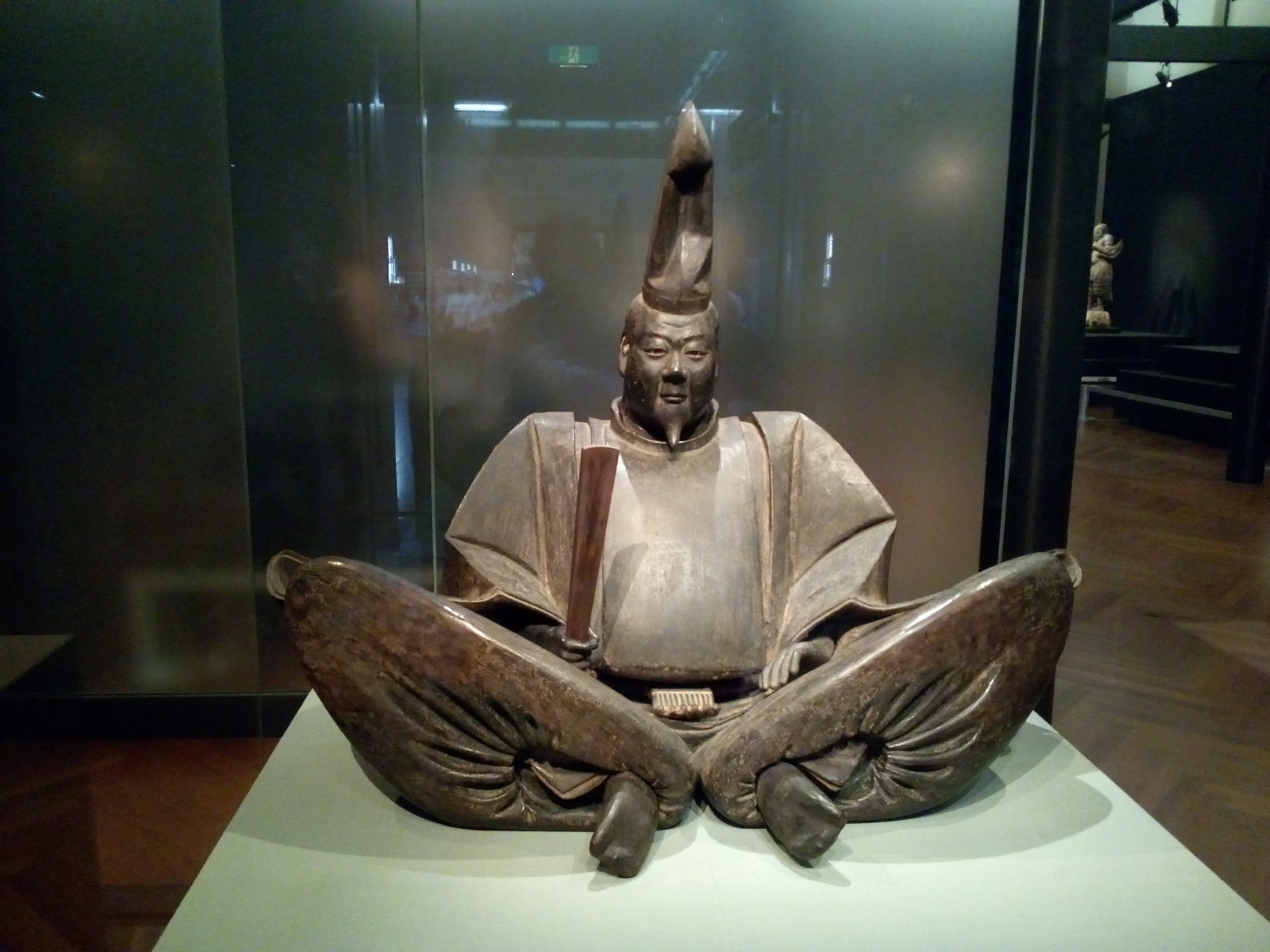
Presumed portrait of Minamoto no Yoritomo, Kamakura period, Tokyo National Museum

In the words of George Bailey Sansom, "Yoritomo was a truly great man … his foresight was remarkable, but so was his practical good sense in setting up machinery to match his own expanding power."

Yoritomo's wife's family, the Hōjō, took control after his death at Kamakura, maintaining power over the shogunate until 1333, under the title of shikken (regent to the shōgun). One of his brothers-in-law was Ashikaga Yoshikane.

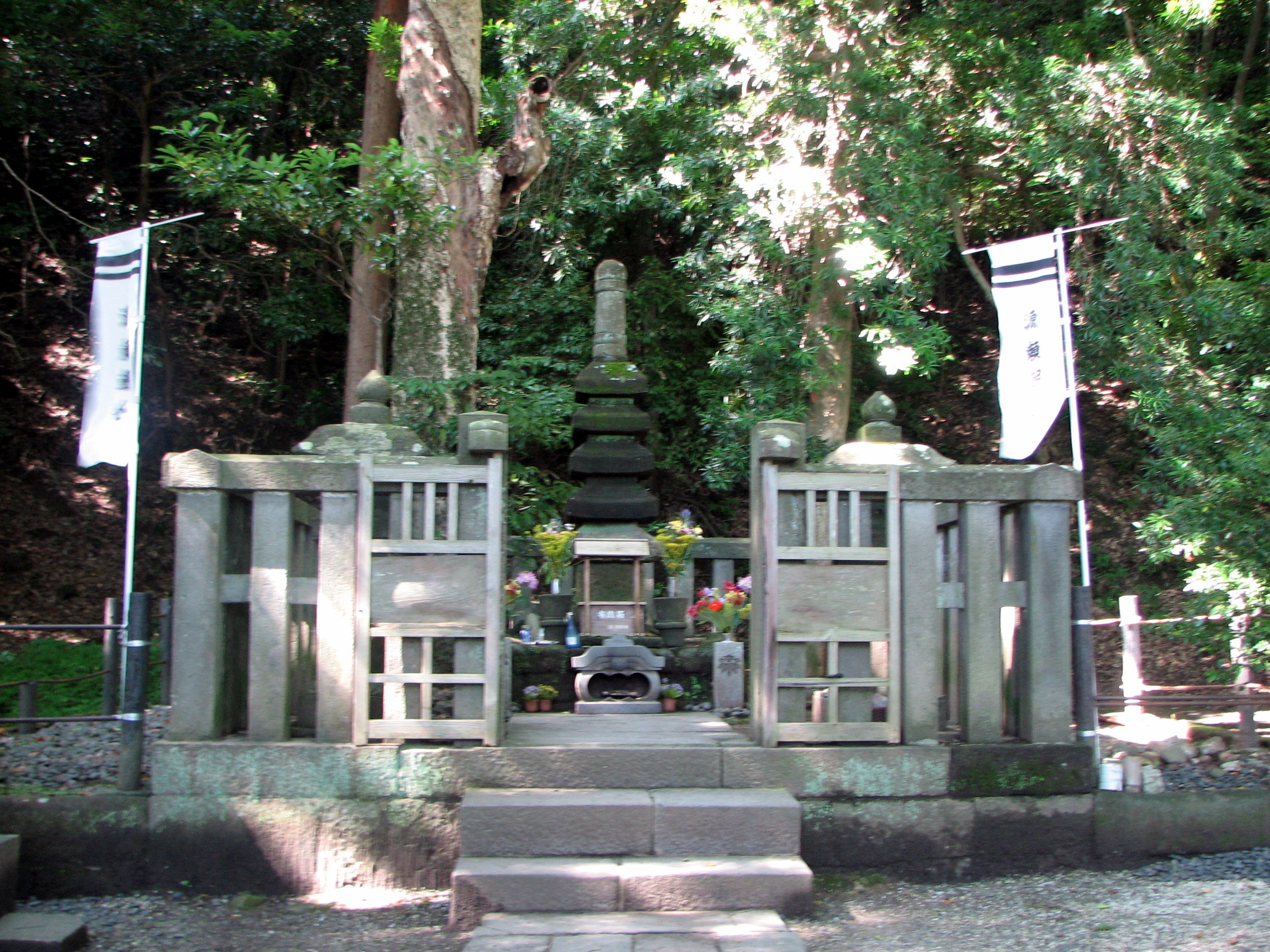
Grave of Yoritomo in Kamakura

The stone pagoda traditionally believed to be his grave is still maintained today, adjacent to Shirahata Shrine, a short distance from the spot believed to be the site of the so-called Ōkura Bakufu, his shogunate's administrative-governmental offices.

== Cultural references ==
He appears as a hero unit in Age of Empires II: The Age of Kings, Total War: Shogun 2 and Lords of the Rising Sun.

A character named "Yoritomo" appears in Book 6: "The Lords of the Rising Sun" in the Fabled Lands adventure gamebook series, where Yoritomo is the self-proclaimed shōgun and on the verge of war with "Lord Kiyomori".

He appears as the final boss in Genpei Toma Den, an arcade game created by Namco in which the player character is Taira no Kagekiyo, another Japanese historical figure.

He also appears as a prominent character in the 2021 anime series The Heike Story. He makes an appearance in Nioh 3.

== Eras of Yoritomo's bakufu ==
The years in which Yoritomo was shōgun are more specifically identified by more than one era name or nengō.

- Kenkyū (1190–1199)
- Shōji (1199–1201)

== See also ==
- Seiwa Genji
- Eiji Yoshikawa, historical fiction writer
- Battle of Hojuji
- Ikezuki (horse)
- Letter from Koshigoe
- Heike Tsuruginomaki
- The Tale of Heike
- Azuma Kagami

== Notes ==
Military offices
Shogunate established	Shōgun: Minamoto no Yoritomo; 1192–1199	Succeeded by Minamoto no Yoriie
