= Minamoto no Yoshitomo =

Samurai of the late Heian period; the head of the Minamoto clan

- 源 義朝
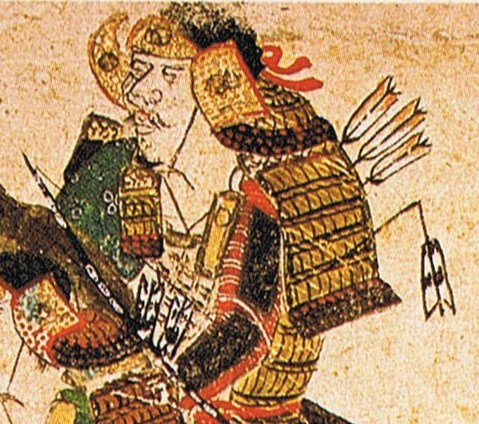

Head of Kawachi Genji
- Preceded by: Minamoto no Tameyoshi
- Succeeded by: Minamoto no Yoritomo

Personal details
- Born: 1123
- Died: February 11, 1160 (aged 36–37)
- Spouse: Yura Gozen
- Relations: Tokiwa Gozen (concubine)
- Children: Minamoto no Yoshihira; Minamoto no Tomonaga; Minamoto no Yoritomo; Minamoto no Noriyori; Minamoto no Yoshitsune
- Parents: Minamoto no Tameyoshi (father); Daughter of Fujiwara no Tadakiyo (mother)

Military service
- Allegiance: Minamoto clan
- Branch/service: Minamoto clan

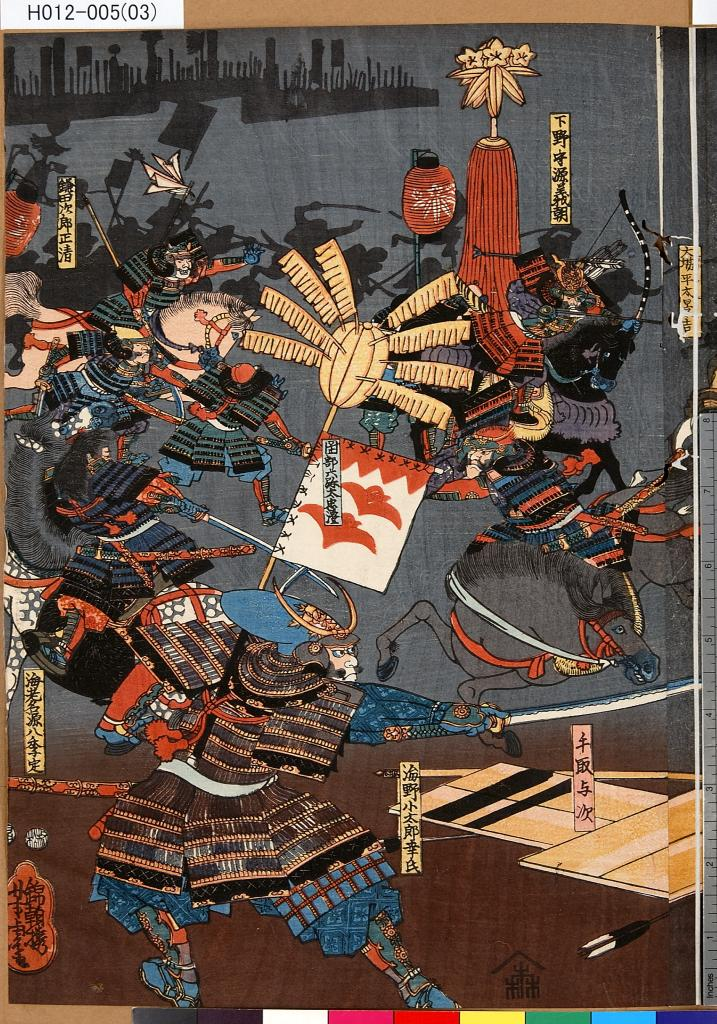
Former Hiraji battle warfare Yoshimasa Shirakawa night view. It features Minamoto no Yoshitomo.

Minamoto no Yoshitomo (源 義朝; 1123 – 11 February 1160) was a Japanese samurai and the head of the Minamoto clan and a general of the late Heian period of Japanese history. His son Minamoto no Yoritomo became shōgun and founded the Kamakura shogunate, the first shogunate in the history of Japan.

His Dharma name was Shōjō Juin (勝定寿院).

== Hōgen Rebellion ==
With the outbreak of the Hōgen Rebellion in 1156, the members of the Minamoto and Taira samurai clans were called into the conflict. Yoshitomo and Taira no Kiyomori both threw their support behind Emperor Go-Shirakawa and Fujiwara no Tadamichi, while Yoshitomo's father, Minamoto no Tameyoshi, sided with the retired Emperor Sutoku and Fujiwara no Yorinaga. Yoshitomo, defeating his father and the forces of Sutoku and Yorinaga, became head of the Minamoto clan and established himself as the main political power in the capital of Kyoto. However, despite attempts to have his father pardoned, he was forced to execute Tameyoshi personally. In the aftermath of the rebellion, the Taira and Minamoto became two of the strongest and most influential clans in Japan, which turned the two clans into bitter rivals.

== Heiji Rebellion ==
In the first months of 1160 while Taira no Kiyomori was absent from the capital of Kyoto, Yoshitomo and Fujiwara no Nobuyori placed Go-Shirakawa under house arrest and killed his retainers, including the scholar Fujiwara no Michinori, in what is called the Heiji rebellion. The civil war wasn't to go on for very long as Kiyomori declared his support for the Emperor and rapidly defeated the rebel forces within the span of a month.

While making his escape from Kyoto, Yoshitomo was forced to sacrifice his son Tomonaga to buy time. Even so, Yoshitomo was eventually betrayed and murdered while taking a bath. Three of his surviving sons, Yoritomo, Yoshitsune and Noriyori, were spared execution and exiled by the victorious Kiyomori. However, Yoshitomo's allies Yoshihira and Nobuyori were both executed.

His grave in Aichi Prefecture is surrounded on all sides by wooden swords (bokuto), as by legend his last words were "If only I'd had a bokuto...".

== Family ==
Yoshitomo fathered nine sons and at least one daughter. His second son, Tomonaga, died during the Heiji rebellion in 1160; having been grievously wounded, he worried about being captured and begged his father to kill him. His eldest, Yoshihira, died following the rebellion. Minamoto no Yoritomo was his eldest surviving son; Yoritomo and all his younger brothers, including Minamoto no Noriyori and Minamoto no Yoshitsune and Yoshitsune's brothers from the same mother, Tokiwa Gozen, Ano Zenjō and Gien, were spared on account of their youth.

Father: Minamoto no Tameyoshi (源為義, 1096–1156)

Mother: Daughter of Fujiwara no Tadakiyo (藤原忠清の娘)

Wife: Yura Gozen (由良御前, ?–1159), "Urahime" (由良姫), daughter of Fujiwara no Suenori (藤原季範)

- Third son: Minamoto no Yoritomo (源頼朝, 1147–1199)
- Fifth son: Minamoto no Mareyoshi (源希義, 1152–1180 or 1182)
- Daughter: Bomonhime ("坊門の姫", 1145 or 1155-1190)

Concubine, either a courtesan or the daughter of Miura Yoshiaki

- First son: Minamoto no Yoshihira (源義平, 1140–1160)

Concubine, sister of Hatano Yoshimichi:

- Second son: Minamoto no Tomonaga (源朝長, 1144–1160)

Courtesan from Totomi province

- Sixth son: Minamoto no Noriyori (源範頼, 1150–1193)

Concubine: Tokiwa Gozen (常盤御前, 1138–?)

- Seventh son: Ano Zenjō (阿野全成, 1153–1203)
- Eighth son: Gien (義円, 1155–1181)
- Ninth son: Minamoto no Yoshitsune (源義経, 1159–1189)

Unknown

- Fourth son: Minamoto no Yoshikado (源義門, ?-?), may have been the son of Yura Gozen

== See also ==
- Siege of Shirakawa-den
- Siege of Sanjō Palace

== Bibliography ==
- Turnbull, Stephen (1998). The Samurai Sourcebook. London: Cassell & Co. page 60.
