= Minamoto no Yoshihira =

Warrior

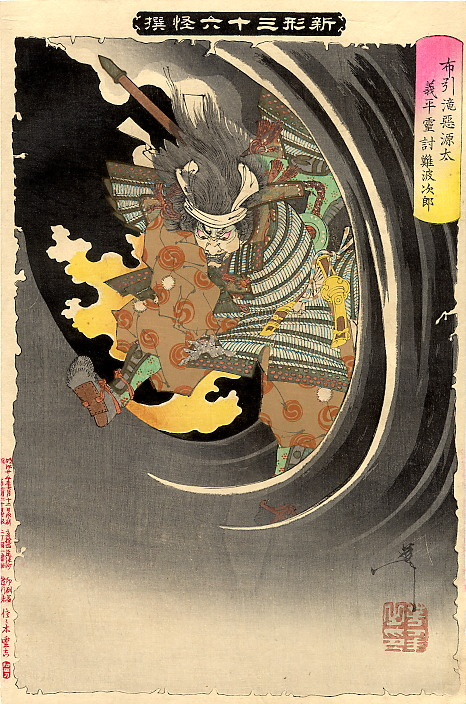
Minamoto no Yoshihira

Minamoto no Yoshihira (源 義平; 1140–1160) also known as 'Akugenda' was a Minamoto clan warrior who fought alongside his father, Minamoto no Yoshitomo, in the Heiji Rebellion.

== Story ==
His mother was the daughter of Miura Yoshiaki, thus indicating the close ties between the two families. His brothers were Minamoto no Tomonaga (also killed during the Heiji rebellion), Minamoto no Yoshitsune, Minamoto no Noriyori and Minamoto no Yoritomo. He married the daughter of Minamoto no Yoshishige, Shojuhime.

In 1155, Yoshihira killed his uncle, Minamoto no Yoshikata, the father of Minamoto no Yoshinaka.

Then, in 1160, Yoshihira was sent to Kyoto to fight in the Heiji Rebellion. The Taira offered to make a peace agreement, but the Minamoto refused, and were soon defeated. Yoshihira succeeded to flee, then attempted to avenge his father by killing a Taira leader by coming back secretly to Kyoto, but he was betrayed, soon captured and decapitated by Taira no Kiyomori, the head of the enemy faction.
