= Minamoto no Tomonaga =

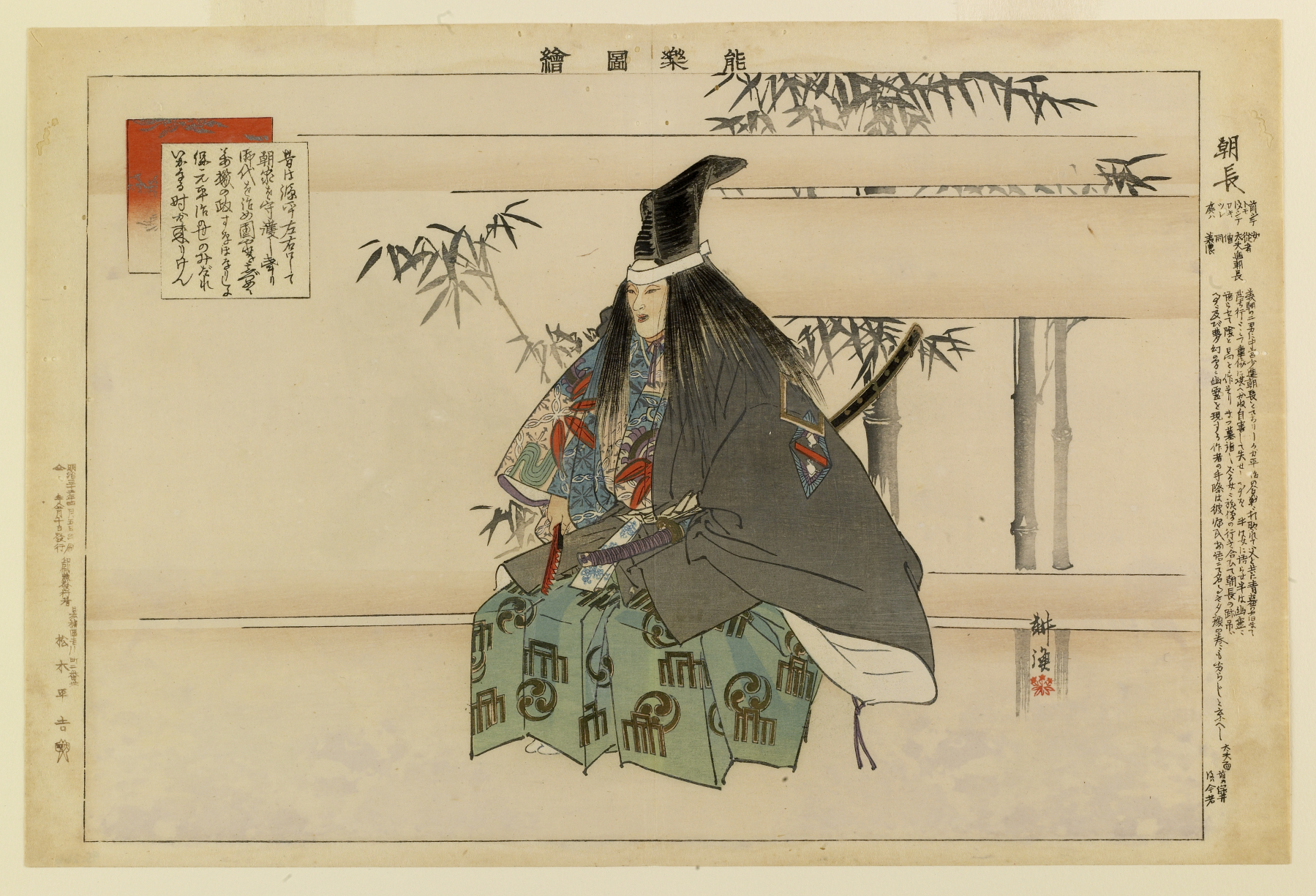
The ghost of Minamoto no Tomonaga

Minamoto no Tomonaga (源 朝長) (1144–1160) was a Minamoto clan samurai of the late Heian period. His father was Minamoto no Yoshitomo and his mother was sister of Hatano Yoshimichi.

Tomonaga accompanied his father and two brothers, Minamoto no Yoshihira and Minamoto no Yoritomo, fleeing Kyoto following their defeat in the Heiji Rebellion in 1160. Tomonaga had been wounded on Mount Hiei. The four made their way through snowstorms to the east in an attempt to levy troops. Yoshihira and Yoritomo went on ahead, while Tomonaga lagged behind. Tomonaga asked his father to kill him so he would not fall into the hands of the enemy. Yoshitomo obliged his son. Shortly afterwards, Yoshitomo was also killed.

Tomonaga's grave was defiled some time later, by Taira no Munekiyo, who brought his head to Kyoto as a trophy.
