= Minamoto no Noriyori =

Japanese samurai lord

Minamoto no Noriyori (源 範頼)
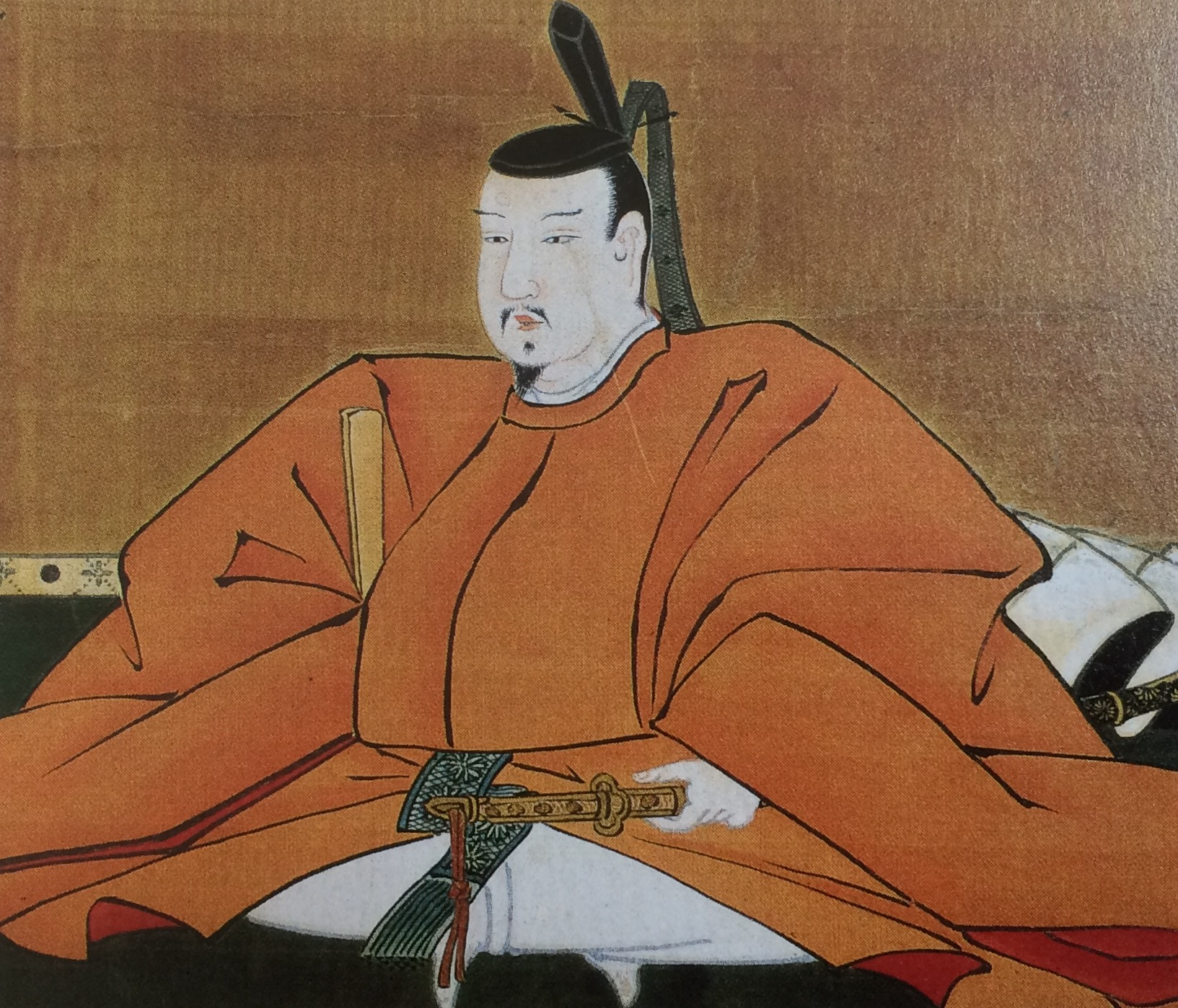
- Born: 1150
- Died: 1193 (aged 42–43)
- Occupation: Military leader
- Parents: Minamoto no Yoshitomo (father); Iwata no Tsubone (mother)
- Relatives: Minamoto no Yoritomo (brother); Minamoto no Yoshitsune (brother)
- Family: Minamoto

Minamoto no Noriyori (源 範頼; 1150 – September 14, 1193) was a Japanese samurai lord of the late Heian period and early Kamakura period, who fought alongside his brothers Minamoto no Yoritomo and Minamoto no Yoshitsune at a number of battles of the Genpei War. He was the sixth son of Minamoto no Yoshitomo.

== Early life ==
As children, he and his brothers Yoritomo and Yoshitsune were spared by Taira no Kiyomori in 1160, following the death of their father, Minamoto no Yoshitomo, after their mother Tokiwa became Kiyomori's concubine.

== Genpei War ==
Noriyori seemingly disappears from any record until 1180, when he served his brother Yoritomo in Kamakura. Beginning in 1184, four years into the Genpei War, he was sent out from Kamakura by Yoritomo, and made his way to the Taira strongholds of Shikoku. Noriyori helped defeat the wayward Minamoto no Yoshinaka, his cousin, at the Second Battle of the Uji and the Battle of Awazu, before moving on to play a central role in the Battle of Ichi-no-Tani. The Taira were pushed back, and the war fell into a lull for about six months, during which Noriyori returned to Kyoto.

Noriyori was sent out once more, in September 1184, to secure the provinces of the Chūgoku region, and then to move on into Kyūshū. He played a major role in the Battle of Kojima. However, attempting to push further, he ran into difficulties of a lack of supplies, and the fact that the Seto Inland Sea was controlled by his enemies. He wrote to his brother in Kamakura, and was told that supplies were on the way, but that the Taira were watching, so any shipments had to be done very carefully. Noriyori finally managed to get rice, other supplies, and a handful of war junks from a local magnate in Suo Province. He moved on into Kyūshū as planned, and remained there, playing no role in the decisive Battle of Dan-no-ura.

After the Genpei War was over, Noriyori returned to Kamakura, where he was rewarded by Yoritomo for his services. However, there was now a feud for dominance of the clan between Yoritomo and Yoshitsune. Yoritomo ordered Noriyori to arrest their brother; after unsuccessfully trying to convince Yoritomo to change his mind, Noriyori simply disobeyed outright.

== Death ==
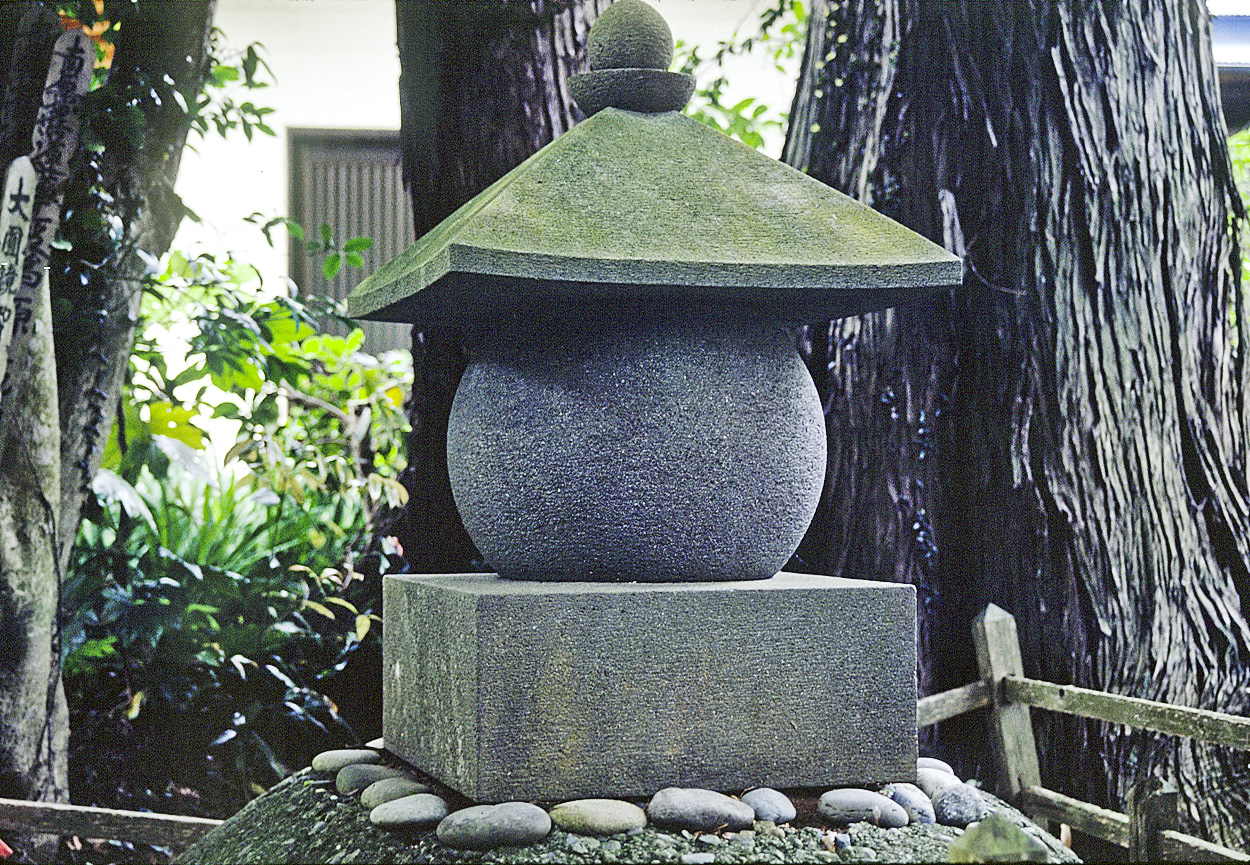
Grave of Minamoto no Noriyori, Shuzenji (present-day Izu), Shizuoka Prefecture

In May 1193, when Yoritomo held a grand hunt on Mount Fuji, an incident occurred in which two brothers of the Soga clan killed Kudo Suketsune, an enemy of their father. A rumor spread that Yoritomo had been killed. Yoritomo's wife, Hōjō Masako, was worried, but Noriyori comforted her, assuring her that even if Yoritomo were killed, he would be there for her and for the clan. These words caused Yoritomo to doubt his brother, who confined Noriyori to Izu Province.

In 1193, Yoritomo had Noriyori killed on charges of conspiracy.However, the Azuma Kagami records that Minamoto no Noriyori was placed under house arrest, but makes no mention of his subsequent death.

== Myths ==
There is a legend in the Adachi District, Fukushima, Musashi Province (now Kitamoto City, Saitama Prefecture), that Noriyori escaped to Ishido without being killed. In addition, The Ishito Kabazakura, which derives from the legend of Noriyori, was designated as a natural monument in the Taisho period and is one of the five most famous cherry trees in Japan.

== Family ==
- Father: Minamoto no Yoshitomo
- Mother: Iwata no Tsubone

== See also ==
- Minamoto clan
- The Tale of Heike
