= Battle of Kanasa Castle =

1180 battle part of the Genpei War

- Part of Genpei War
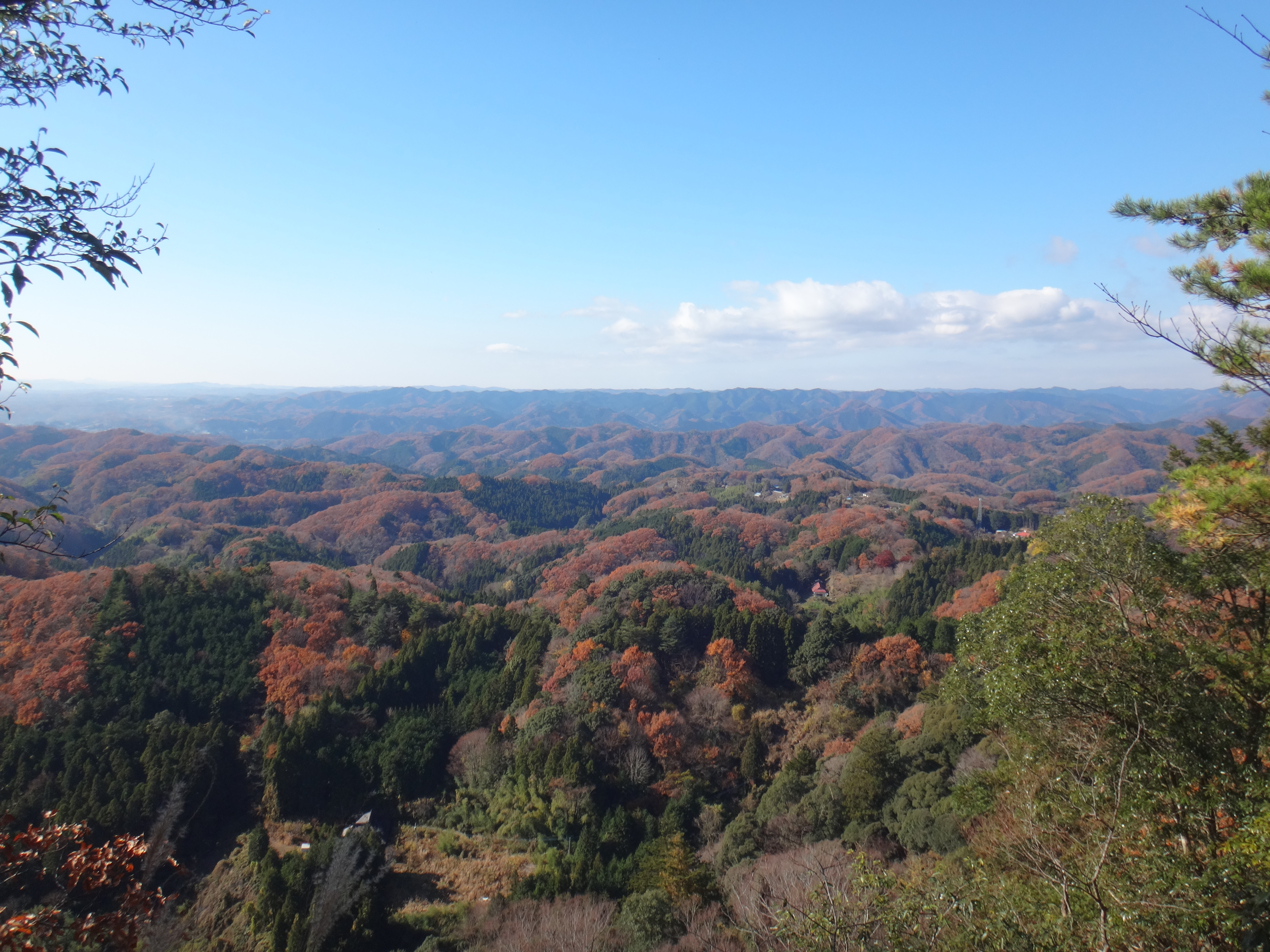
- View of the general area from the main hall of a nearby shrine
Date	4–5 November 1180 (Jishō calendar); 22–23 November 1180 (Gregorian calendar)
Location	Kanasa Castle in Hitachi Province (near present day Hitachi-Ōta City, Ibaraki Prefecture)
Result	Minamoto victory

Belligerents
Minamoto clan	Satake clan

Commanders and leaders
Minamoto no Yoritomo	Satake Hideyoshi

Strength
Several thousand	Unknown

The Battle of Kanasa Castle (金砂城の戦い, Kanasajō no Tatakai) began on the night of 4 November 1180 (Jishō Calendar) or 22 November 1180 (Gregorian calendar), and ended on the 5th at Kanasa Castle in Hitachi Province (near present-day Hitachi-Ōta City, Ibaraki Prefecture) between the Minamoto clan led by Minamoto no Yoritomo and the Satake clan led by Satake Hideyoshi. It ended with a Minamoto victory.

The Satake clan held ties with the Taira clan, causing them to adopt an anti-Minamoto stance. After Yoritomo's victory at the Battle of Fujigawa, it was decided that rather than chase the pursuing Taira clan, the Satake should be subdued first, leading Minamoto forces to set out on 27 October and arrive at Hitachi Kokufu on 4 November.

Here, Hirotsune convinced Satake Yoshimasa to come alone to the center of Ōyabashi Bridge, where he was executed. This led to some of Yoshimasa's followers bowing and surrendering or fleeing. This was quickly followed by Hideyoshi further fortifying Kanasa, which was followed by a Minamoto full-scale assault on it. After hours of fighting, retainers delivered a message to Yoritomo at 4am the next day, notifying him that the castle "cannot be taken by human force".

This led to a meeting with Hideyoshi's uncle, Satake Masanari, where he was successfully convinced to defect in return for land gained through killing Hideyoshi. After the arrival of Masanari, defending forces fell into disarray at the unexpected defection, leading Hirotsune to push the offensive further and Hideyoshi to disappear without a trace.

At around 2am the following morning, the castle had its walls burned down and troops were sent to look for Hideyoshi. Despite a rumor about his whereabouts being near the Satake-controlled Hanazono Castle, Yoritomo didn't pursue Hideyoshi to it due to possible threats from the nearby Fujiwara clan. As a result of the victory, Hideyoshi's holdings were confiscated and redistributed as rewards for the warriors.

== Background ==
The Satake clan was a branch of the Seiwa Genji clan, descending from Minamoto no Yoshimitsu's grandson, Minamoto no Masayoshi. Due to Yoshimitsu's exploits in the Gosannen War, where he abandoned a high governmental position to fight for and aid his brother, Minamoto no Yoshiie, he was awarded land in the Hitachi and Mutsu provinces, receiving the title "Governor of Hitachi" and the Satake Estate in the former. Minamoto no Yoshinari, one of Yoshimitsu's many sons, then inherited control of the Satake Estate, and subsequently moved there. He married a popular local figure, forming an alliance with the Taira clan, who controlled southern Hitachi. Soon his own son took control of all of the Seven Northern Districts of Hitachi. (Note: Term to describe the area of: Taga District; Northern, Eastern, Western, and Southern Kuji District; Eastern and Western Naka District) Masayoshi then adopted the name Satake, becoming the founder. Satake Takayoshi further extended the influence of the clan beyond Hitachi Province. Through the Taira branch in Hitachi, the clan maintained ties with the central Taira leadership, and when Minamoto no Yoritomo raised an army in Izu for the Battle of Ishibashiyama, the Satake clan adopted a clear anti-Minamoto stance.

== Prelude ==
After Yoritomo's victory at the Battle of Fujigawa in October, he ordered the pursuit of the fleeing Taira clan. This was however argued against by Kazusa Hirotsune, Chiba Tsutane, Miura Yoshizumi, and other advisors who felt that the "Eastern Barbarians" (Note: The advisors refer to the Satake as "Barbarians" for not having submitted to the Minamoto's army following Prince Mochihito's Imperial Decree.) should be subdued first. Yoritomo then abandoned the pursuit of the Taira, and began preparing to march toward the Hitachi Province, stopping at Kamakura on the 25th.

On 27 October, Yoritomo set out with his forces to where the Satake clan resided. This day was predicted to be a day of misfortune for Yoritomo according to Onmyōdō (a type of astrologically based fortune telling method), and his allies advised him against the departure. However, Yoritomo continued their journey, stating:

“The imperial decree by Emperor Mochihito arrived on April 27th, and as a result, I was able to take control of the Kanto region. There is no need to worry about the date. In fact, the 27th is an auspicious day for a subjugation campaign.”

— Minamoto no Yoritomo

On 4 November, Yoritomo arrived at the provincial capital of Hitachi (Hitachi Kokufu), where a military council was held. Satake's authority within Hitachi was very solid, and retainers filled the entire province. Therefore, the advisors Tsutane, Hirotsune, and Yoshizumi concluded that no sudden action be taken, but that a very careful strategy was needed to impose punishment. They sent Kazusa Hirotsune (Minamoto clan samurai lord and gōzoku who had family ties with the Satake) as an emissary to meet with the leaders of the Satake clan. When informed of this, Satake Yoshimasa replied that he would come immediately. The young Satake Hideyoshi amassed a larger group of soldiers for the meeting compared to Yoshimasa out of caution. Their father, Satake Takayoshi, for unstated reasons, decided that he would not attend, and withdrew into Kanasa Castle. Yoshimasa, lured there by Hirotsune, arrived at the local Ōyabashi Bridge. Yoshimasa's retainers were sent to wait at the beginning of the bridge, and Yoshimasa alone was invited to the center of the bridge, where Hirotsune had him swiftly executed. Seeing this, some of Yoshimasa's followers bowed and surrendered, while others fled.

== Battle ==
Hideyoshi, anticipating the coming battle, fortified Kanasa, having improvements made on the castle walls and strengthening the natural defenses. Satake Takayoshi seeing that their fortress was practically impregnable and in an advantageous natural position, decided to venture on a trip to Kyoto, the capital of the country at the time. On the night of the 4th, the full-scale assault was launched. As the castle was built high on a mountain peak, soldiers and their horses were unable to move freely. As a result, the soldiers grew exhausted, unable to advance. The fighting continued overnight. At around 4 in the morning on the 5th, various retainers sent a messenger to Yoritomo. The message stated "The fortress that the Satake have built cannot be taken by human force. The soldiers defending it are such that it is no exaggeration to say that each one could fight a thousand. You should carefully consider a wiser plan".

Hirotsune then advised Yoritomo that he meet Satake Masanari, Hideyoshi's uncle, who he described as "a man of great intelligence, and whose ambition exceeds that of ordinary men", and that if a reward is offered, he would be persuaded to defect to the Minamoto's side. Yoritomo accepted the proposal, and had Hirotsune meet Masanari. Masanari was delighted to meet with Hirotsune, the latter having quickly and easily persuaded the uncle to join his side by offering to give him the land gained through killing Hideyoshi. Since Masanari was already familiar with the terrain, he went with Hirotsune, flanking behind Kanasa Castle, and raised a war cry which panicked defending forces who didn't expect him to defect. The sudden attack threw Hideyoshi and his followers into disarray, causing them to abandon their defensive positions. Hirotsune capitalised on this pressed the offensive. Hideyoshi then fled the castle and disappeared without a trace.

== Aftermath ==
At around 2 a.m the following morning, Hirotsune entered the abandoned stronghold where Hideyoshi had fled and burned down its walls. Afterward, the troops were split up and sent along the various roads to search for Hideyoshi. There had been a rumor that he had gone deep into the mountains and gone to Hanazono Castle, another castle of the Satake clan. However, Yoritomo did not pursue Hideyoshi all the way to Hanazono Castle. This may have been because the castle was very near Mutsu Province, and Yoritomo was wary of the possibility of agitating the formidable Fujiwara clan if he went north.

Hideyoshi's holdings, the seven northern districts of Hitachi Province, together with the surrounding estates he owned and other locations, were confiscated and redistributed as rewards for the fighting contribution of the warriors.

== Bibliography ==
- "吾妻鏡" [Azuma Kagami (Historical Chronicle)].
- "治承・寿永の乱" [Genpei War]. Ameba. 2019-11-16.
- "佐竹秀義と花園山" [Satake Hideyoshi and Mt. Hanazono]. Adeac. p. 36.
- "金砂城 (かなさじょう)とは? 意味や使い方 - コトバンク" [What is Kanasajo (Golden Sand Castle)? Meaning and Usage].
- "武家家伝_佐竹氏 - 播磨屋" [Satake Family Tradition - Harimaya].
