= Battle of Kinugasa Castle =

Battle in the Genpei War

- Part of Genpei War
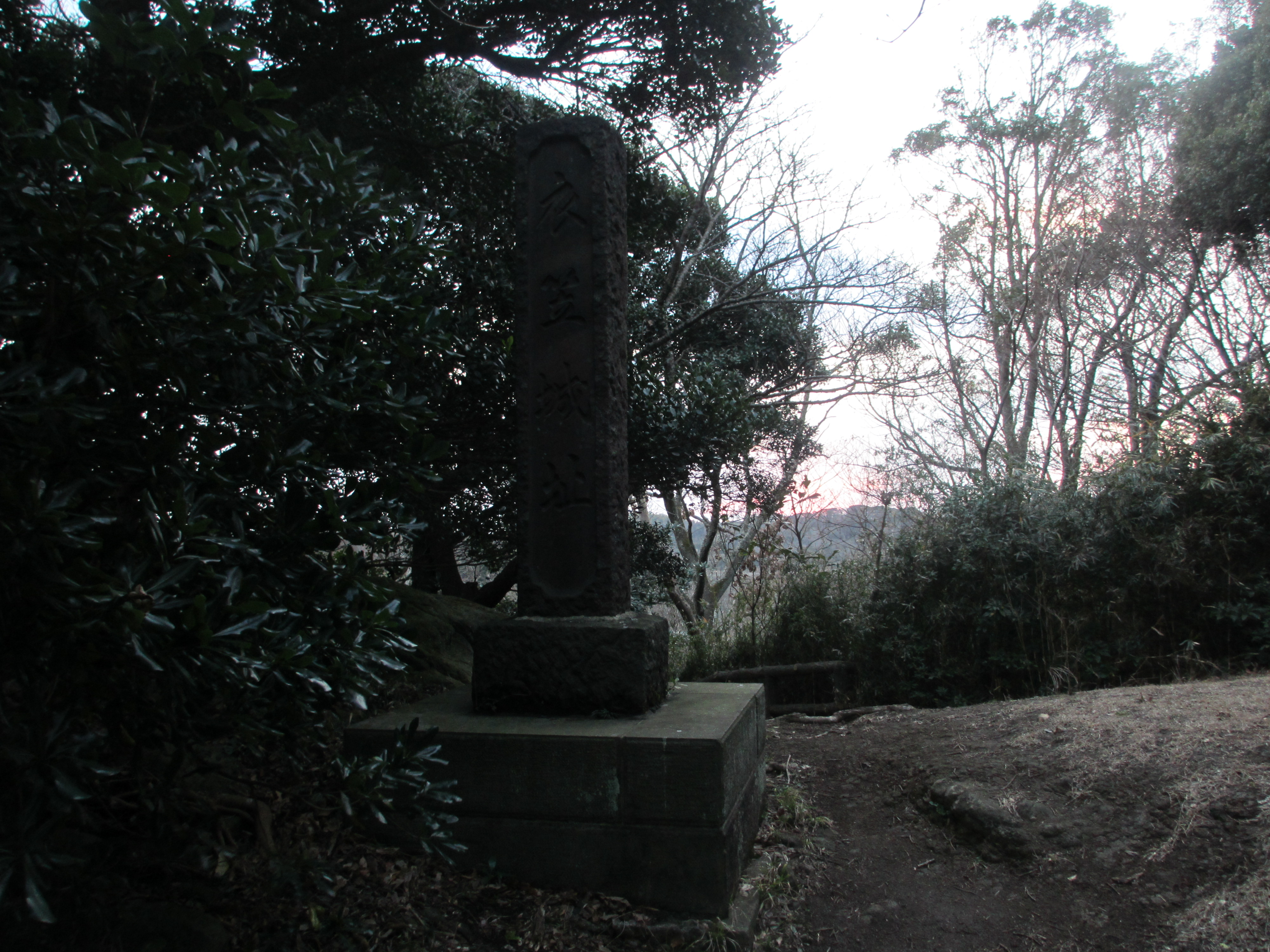
- Monument of the Kinugasa Castle
Date	August 26, 1180 Jishō calendar
Location	Kinugasa Castle, Sagami Province (modern day Kinugasa Yokosuka)
Result	Taira clan victory

Belligerents
Taira clan	Miura clan (pro-Minamoto)

Commanders and leaders
(Taira clan) Hatakeyama Shigetada; (Taira clan) Edo Shigenaga; (Taira clan) Shigeyori Kawagoe	Miura Yoshizumi; Miura Yoshiaki †

Units involved
"Several thousand"/2,000	450

The Battle of Kinugasa Castle (衣笠城合戦, Kinugasa Jō Kassen) was a battle between the Taira (and its 2 branches, the Edo and Chichibushi clans) against the pro-Minamoto Miura clan that took place on August 26, 1180 (Jishō calendar) (September 17, 1180 Julian calendar) at Kinugasa Castle in Sagami Province, which is now Kinugasa Town, Yokosuka City, Kanagawa Prefecture. It was one of the battles in the Genpei War, a civil war over control of the Imperial Family and Japan.

== Background ==
On August 22nd, the Miura Clan heard of Minamoto no Yoritomo raising an Army, after which Miura Yoshizumi, alongside other Miura clan members, left to meet up with Yoritomo. They couldn't reach their destination due to heavy rains and had to camp by the Sakawa River. Yoshizumi then sent his retainers to burn down the houses of the Taira forces, which led the Taira to begin the attack on Yoritomo's forces, fearing the Miura forces would be able to reinforce Yoritomo if they waited any longer. This began the Battle of Ishibashiyama, in which Yoritomo lost and had to flee. The next morning, the Miura party had gotten news of Yoritomo's loss and had decided to go back home. Hatakeyama Shigetada, a general on the side of the Taira clan, set out with 500 men upon hearing of Yoritomo's army's uprising, and on the 24th, he met and fought a battle with the Miura clan, who had roughly 300 men, and were on their way back from the Sakawa River. This encounter led to the Battle of Kotsubo. The Hatakeyama forces retreated, and the Miura clan had won, beheading more than 50 of Shigetada's retainers. Although some of the Miura had been killed, they managed to reach their base in Miura.

On the 26th of August (Jishō calendar), Hatakeyama wanted to get back at the Miura for the Battle of Kotsubo, which he had lost. He sent Shigeyori Kawagoe and Edo Shigenaga a message, telling them that they should gather an army from their provinces and come to meet him. Although Shigeyori is the second son of the Chichibu family, he inherited the family leadership. Soon after, in the hour of the rabbit (6:00), rumors of this mobilization spread to the Miura, and the entire family retreated, and set up camp in Kinugasa Castle.

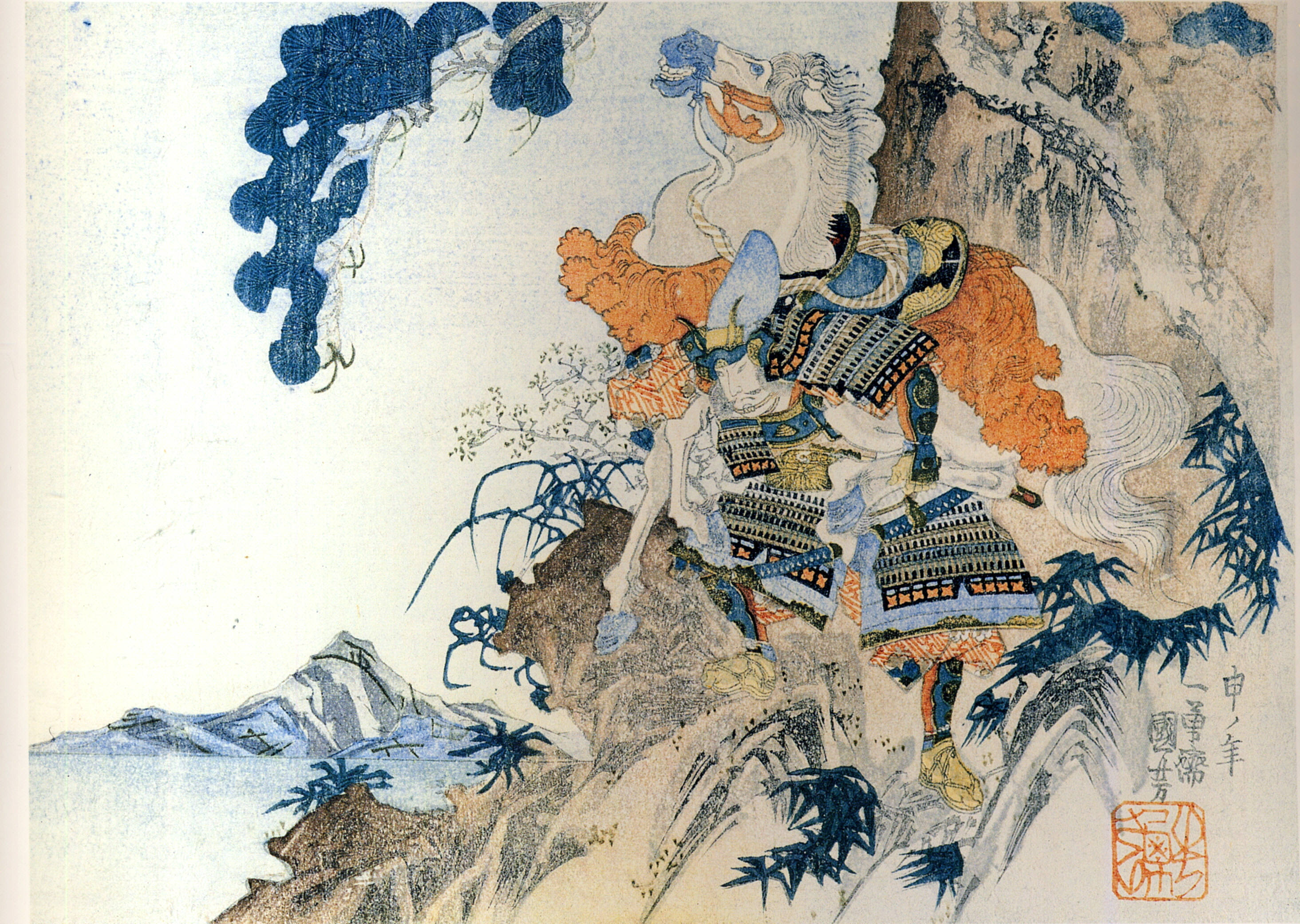
Hatakeyama Shigetada, a Ukiyo-e style woodblock print, made by Utagawa Kuniyoshi

== Battle ==
The main eastern gate was manned by Yoshizumi and Sawara Yoshitsune, the western gate by Wada Yoshimori and Kaneda Yoritsugu, and the center gate by Nagae Yoshikage and Otawa Yoshihisa.

Exhausted from the previous battle in Kotsubo pass and running out of arrows, the Miura clan eventually abandoned Kinugasa Castle at night and escaped, heading for Awa Province to join Yoritomo's new call to arms, after he had recovered from Ishibashiyama and his allies defeated the Taira at the Battle of Hashidayama. On the 27th, Kinugasa Castle was captured by the Taira army.

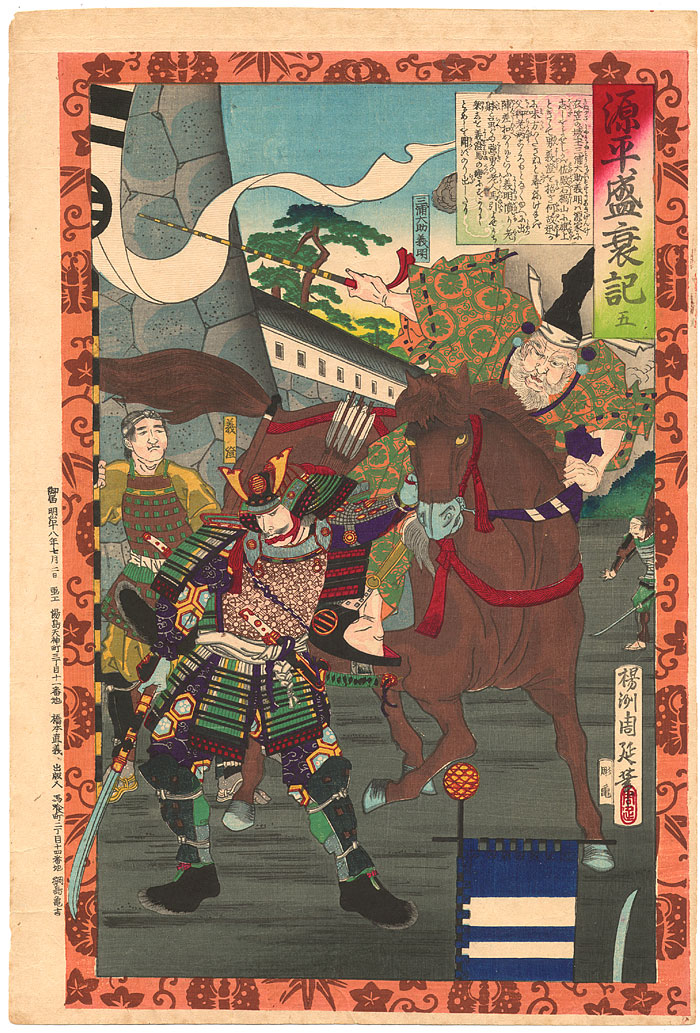
Miura Yoshiaki on horseback outside of Kinugasa Castle

According to the Azuma Kagami, Miura Yoshiaki wrote:

"As a vassal/retainer of the Genji clan (Minamoto clan) for many generations, I am fortunate to be living in an era when our noble lineage is being reborn. I have already lived for more than 80 years, I do not know how much longer I can expect to live. I now wish to throw my old life into the service of the military, and to ask for the merits of my descendants. You (rest of the Miura clan) should all leave quickly and inform the Minamoto of the whereabouts of Shigetada. I alone shall remain in the fortress."

The Miura retainers, reluctant to leave the 89-year-old Miura Yoshiaki behind, carried him in a Palanquin and tried to leave the castle. However, as the enemy approached, they abandoned the palanquin and fled. Yoshiaki was stripped of his clothes by the Taira and was killed by the Taira army, led by his grandson Hatakeyama Shigetada.

== Aftermath ==
After the battle, the remaining Miura and Yoritomo forces regrouped into a large army, along with Chiba Tsunetane and Kazusa Hirotsune, the two major powers on the Bōsō Peninsula. On October 2nd, Yoritomo's camp of 30,000 soldiers crossed the Ōi River and Sumida River and proceeded to Musashi Province. There they met Adachi Tomoto, who welcomed them. On October 4th, Hatakeyama Shigetada, Edo Shigenaga and Kawagoe Shigeyori surrendered to Yoritomo on a ferry. Yoritomo told the present Miura forces not to hold grudges, or else the Minamoto clan will not achieve their goals. The Miura forces agreed, and discussed their next moves with the rest of the party.

== Sources ==
Azuma Kagami (in Japanese)
English translation of The Tale of the Heike (archived)

Secondary:
Additional information regarding the Battle of Kotsubo (in Japanese) (Kotsubo)
https://tamaki39.blogspot.com/2017/06/blog-post_25.html (in Japanese) (Kotsubo & Kinugasa)
https://history.orange-shoes.biz/伝承地めぐり/衣笠城/ (in Japanese) (Kinugasa)
