= Battle of Hashidayama =

Battle in the Genpei War

- Part of Genpei War
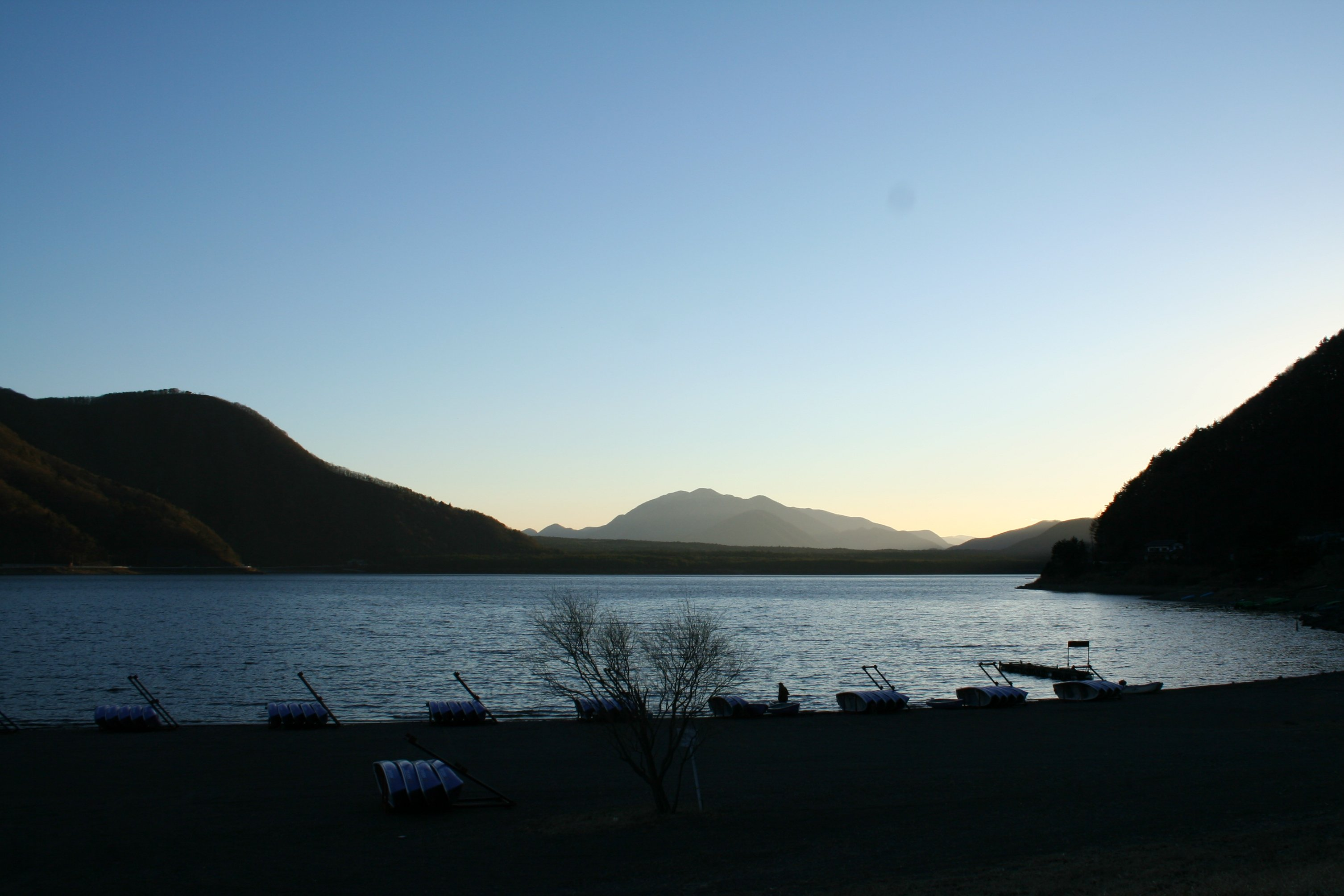
- Image of Lake Saiko, around the area the battle is believed to have happened.
Date	August 25, 1180 Jishō calendar
Location	"Hashida Mountain", Suruga Province
Result	Minamoto clan victory

Belligerents
Minamoto clan	Taira clan

Commanders and leaders
Yasuda Yoshisada; Kudo Kagemitsu	(Taira clan) Kagehisa Matano; (Taira clan) Tachibana no Tomochi

The Battle of Hashidayama (波志田山合戦) was one of the battles during the Genpei War, taking place in 1180. The location of Mount Hashida is assumed to be at the northern foot of Fuji, but the exact location is unknown due to various theories. This battle is what brought awareness to The Kai Minamoto clan in Japan.

== Overview ==
According to Azuma Kagami, Prince Mochihito, son of Emperor Go-Shirakawa, issued a decree to the Minamoto clan in the east to defeat the Taira clan, which was sent to Minamoto no Yoritomo in Izu, Kai and Shinano provinces. Minamoto no Yoritomo raised an army in August of the same year, leading warriors from Izu and Sagami provinces, and was defeated on August 23rd at the Battle of Ishibashiyama by an army led by Ōba Kagechika of the Taira clan.

Some clans were related to the Izu warriors close to Minamoto no Yoritomo, such as The Kai Minamoto (Ruled by the Takeda clan), founded by Minamoto no Yoshikiyo and his son Kiyomitsu in around 1131, who controlled the Kofu Basin area. Others, such as the Akiyama clan of Kagami Tohmitsu in Kai, and the Ogasawara clan in Shinano, served the Taira clan and/or had a residence in Kyoto.

Among the clans related to the Izu warriors, Kudo Kagemitsu agreed with Yoritomo's military expedition, and his family members, Shigemitsu and Chikamitsu, went to Yoritomo's side. Yoritomo hid in the Hakone Mountains after the defeat at Mt. Ishibashi, planning to dispatch Hōjō Tokimasa and Yoshitoki, father and son, to Kai province (according to Azuma Kagami), and it is believed that Yoritomo was aware of the existence of the Kai Minamoto.

According to Azuma Kagami, when the defeat at the Battle of Ishibashiyama was reported to Kai, the Kai Minamoto clan, led by Yasuda Yoshisada and Kudo Kagemitsu went to rescue Minamoto no Yoritomo (as well as other clans close to him).

On the Taira side, Kagehisa Matano, the younger brother of Kagechika Oba, dispatched an army to Kai together with Tachibana no Tomochi, the leader of the Suruga province, and the two armies clashed on August 25 at "Mount Hashida". The location of "Mount Hashida" is thought to be around Fujikawaguchiko Town/Mt. Ashiwada, located between Saiko Lake and Lake Kawaguchi at the northern foot of Fuji.

== Battle ==
According to Azuma Kagami, 100 bowstrings of the Taira's army were broken by rats during a stay in a village. Soon after in the morning, he heard that Yasuda no Yoshisada, Kudo Kagemitsu, and his sons had become ready to fight a battle, and while the pro-Minamoto forces were setting out from Kai Province, they met Kagehisa and others at Hashidayama. The battle began with a strong attack by Yasuda's forces, consisting mostly of arrow barrages. Although the Taira forces did fight back, Kagehisa and his men had their bowstrings cut, and had to take up swords. Many of the Taira forces were killed. Yasuda's subordinates and others were also forced to take up swords at a point. However Kagehisa managed to flee. The Taira eventually left and were routed.

In the Sankai-ki, Minamoto no/Nitta Yoshishige, the leader and founder of the Nitta clan, sent a letter to Fujiwara no Tadamasa (Tadamasa was the elder brother of Nakayama Tadachika, the author of the "Sankaiki"), a feudal lord close to the Taira clan, reporting Takeda Nobuyoshi, one of the leaders of the Kai Minamoto clan, as an anti-Taira force alongside Yoritomo. The victory at Mount Hashida is thought to have triggered awareness of the existence of the Kai Minamoto clan in the eastern part of Japan and elsewhere.

== Aftermath ==
On August 28, Yoritomo escaped from Kanagawa Prefecture to Awa Province (Chiba) to rejoin his army and rallied many warriors in the East. The rest of the Minamoto and Takeda Nobuyoshi had received word of the Battle of Mount Hashida in early-mid September and were asked to go to Suruga province to fight, however, Takeda Nobuyoshi, Ichijō Tadayori and others of the Kai Minamoto clan went to Ina County, Shinano Province (modern day Nagano Prefacture) and defeated Taira Tomonori in modern day Komagane first. On November 9th, the Kai Minamoto clan, headed by Takeda Nobuyoshi, went to Suruga to fight the Taira force at the Battle of Fujigawa, which they won.

== Sources ==
Azuma Kagami (in Japanese)
English translation of The Tale of the Heike (archived)
https://history.orange-shoes.biz/深読み吾妻鏡/波志太山合戦の顛末/ (Secondary)
https://ameblo.jp/oyomaru-0826/entry-12415959663.html (Secondary)
