= Kazusa =

Kazusa may refer to:

- Kazusa Province (上総国, Kazusa-no kuni), former province of Japan
- Kazusa, Nagasaki (加津佐町 Kazusa-machi), former town in Minamitakaki District, Nagasaki Prefecture, Japan

== People with the surname ==
- Kazusa Hirotsune (上総 広常) (died 1183), Japanese samurai lord and gōzoku
- Aranami Kazusa (和沙 荒浪), Japanese voice actress

== People with the given name ==
- Kazusa Murai (村井 かずさ) (born 1975), Japanese voice actress
- Kazusa Ogawa (小川 和紗, born 1997), Japanese Paralympic judoka
- Kazusa Okuyama (奥山 かずさ, born 1994), Japanese model
- Kazusa Takashima (高嶋 上総), Japanese manga artist

== Fictional characters ==
- Kazusa Kyoyama, a character in the role-playing video game Blue Archive
- Kazusa Onodera, a character in the manga O Maidens in Your Savage Season
- Kazusa Touma, a character in the visual novel White Album 2
- Kazusa Yamashiro, a character in the anime Muv-Luv Alternative: Total Eclipse
