= Yasuda Yoshisada =

Governor of Tōtōmi Province

Yasuda Yoshisada 安田義定

Governor of Tōtōmi Province
- In office 1180–1193
- Monarchs: Antoku; Go-Toba

Personal details
- Born: 1134
- Died: September 5, 1194 (aged 61)
- Children: Yasuda Yoshisuke
- Parent: Minamoto no Yoshikiyo (father)
- Occupation: Daimyo

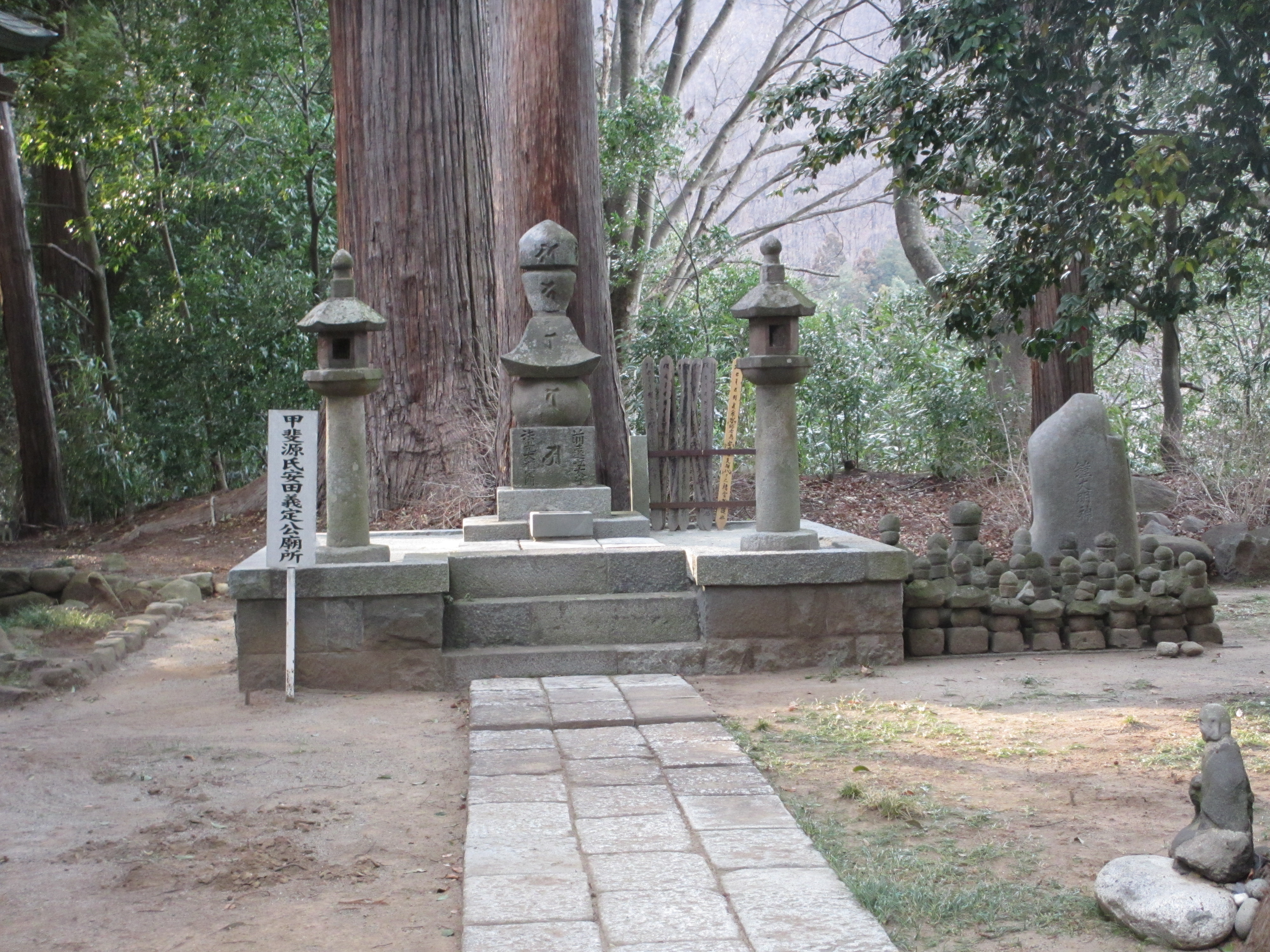
Yasuda Yoshisada Mausoleum at Hōkō-ji temple in Kōshū, Yamanashi

Yasuda Yoshisada (安田 義定, 1134 - September 5, 1194) was a Japanese samurai lord of the late Heian and early Kamakura period. He served as Governor of Tōtōmi Province for both the Kamakura shogunate and the Imperial Court, as shugo and kami, respectively.

== Life ==
Yasuda Yoshisada was born in 1134, the son of Minamoto no Yoshikiyo, the 2nd head of the Kai Minamoto clan. The Kai Minamoto clan was of the Seiwa Genji lineage. He was adopted by his elder brother Minamoto no Kiyomitsu.

During the late Heian period, the Kai Minamoto clan expanded and settled in various parts of the Kōfu Basin, but the Saigusa clan, a powerful ancient family of government officials in the Kyōtō region, was defeated after the suspension of the Yashiro Manor in 1162. It is believed that Yoshisada had expanded into the eastern part of the Kōfu Basin and succeeded the old Yasuda clan, thus taking the surname Yasuda. Yoshisada was powerful in the eastern part of the Fuefuki River basin, ruling the Yahata Manor, Maki Manor, and Yasuda Manor in Yasuda, Yamanashi, Kai Province. He had a mansion in present-day Kobara-nishi, Yamanashi, Yamanashi Prefecture.

In 1180, he was called to arms by Minamoto no Yoritomo, as the rest of the Minamoto clan. Yoshisada traveled to war in Suruga Province with the fellow clan member Takeda Nobuyoshi. After defeating the Taira clan in the Battle of Fujikawa, Yoshisada was appointed Governor (shugo) of Tōtōmi Province on behalf of the Kamakura shogunate.

In 1183, he traveled to the capital city of Kyoto alongside Minamoto no Yoshinaka. There, the Imperial Court in Kyoto also appointed Yoshisada as Governor (kami) of Tōtōmi Province. This kind of independent activity proves that although Yoshisada had been fighting under Yoritomo, it was only after defeating the remaining Taira clan's forces in the Battle of Ichinoya in 1184 that he became loyal in service to Yoritomo.

His other military campaigns included the punitive expedition of Minamoto no Yoshinaka and the Battle of Ōshu in 1184.

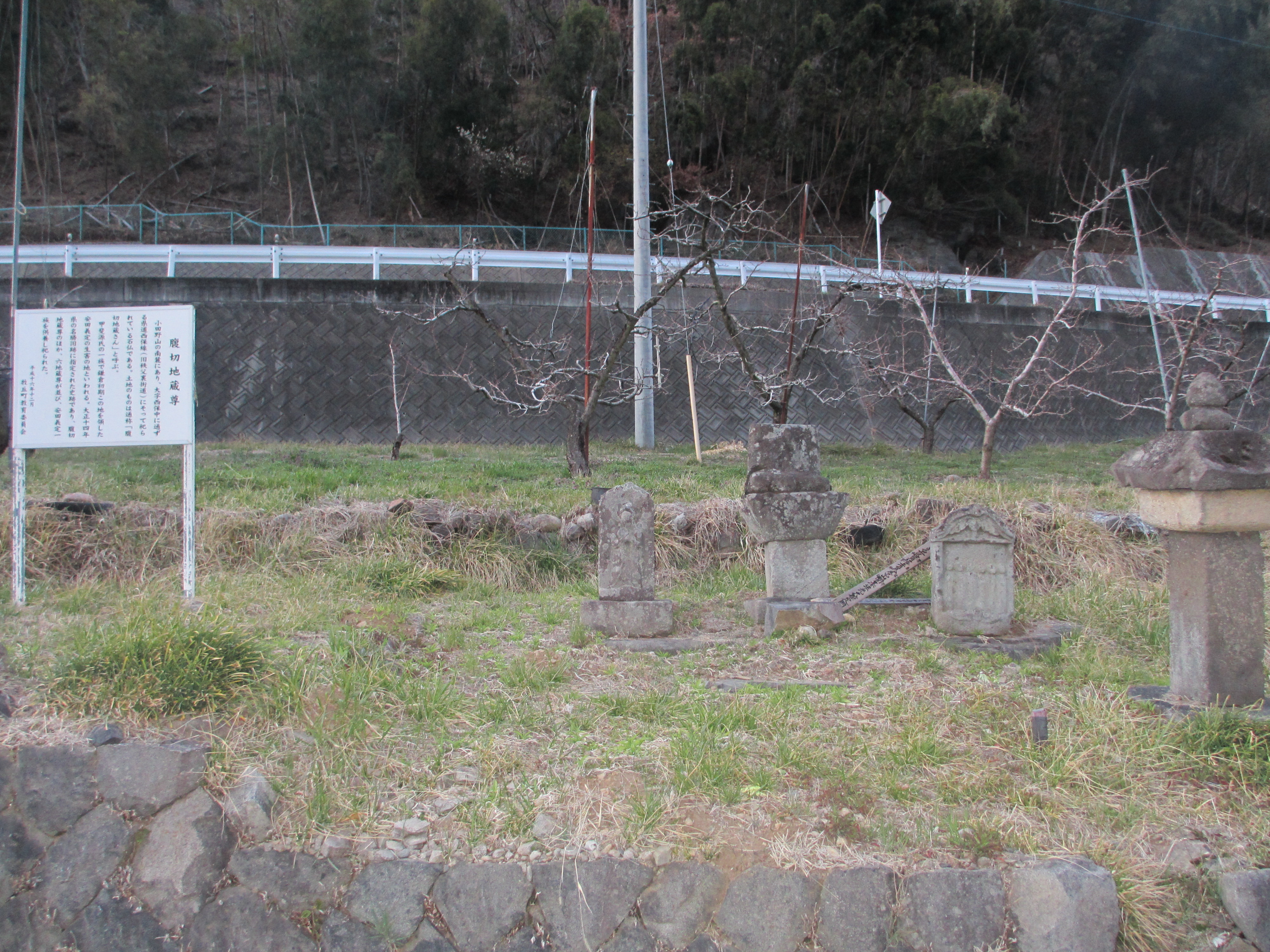
The site of Yasuda Yoshisada's seppuku

In 1193, Kajiwara Kagetoki gave a slanderous report of Yoshisada's son Yasuda Yoshisuke, claiming that Yoshisuke had sent a love letter to a court lady during a memorial service at Yakushidō of the Yōfuku-ji temple. Yoshisuke was executed and gibbeted for this crime. Yoshisada and the extended family was also punished, as the criminal law at the time included extending complicity for a crime to the criminal's family members. He was disfavored by Yoritomo, and was stripped from his territories and his position as Governor of Tōtōmi Province.

The following year, Yoshisada was killed on the suspicion of treason on September 5, 1194. He was 61 years old.

According to Kamakura Ōzōshi, the two men sent to kill Yoshisada were Kajiwara Kagetoki and Katō Kagekado, and Yoshisada was forced to commit suicide (seppuku) at the Hōkō-ji temple (in present-day Kōshū, Yamanashi Prefecture). In Sonpi Bunmyaku, the place where Yoshisada was killed is described as "Ōmidō, Ōikubo, Maki Manor", which is interpreted by some as Amidadō of the Hōkō-ji temple or as the Ōimatakubo Hachiman Shrine in Yamanashi City. After the fall of the Yasuda clan, the Maki Manor and other territories are said to have been given to Katō Kagekado, but there are no historical records linking the Katō clan to Maki Manor.

== In popular culture ==
=== TV series ===
- Yoshitsune (2005) NHK Taiga Drama, Ichirō Shinjitsu as Yasuda Yoshisada

== Gallery ==
Yasuda Yoshisada family grave and explanation board in Shimoijiri, Yamanashi City

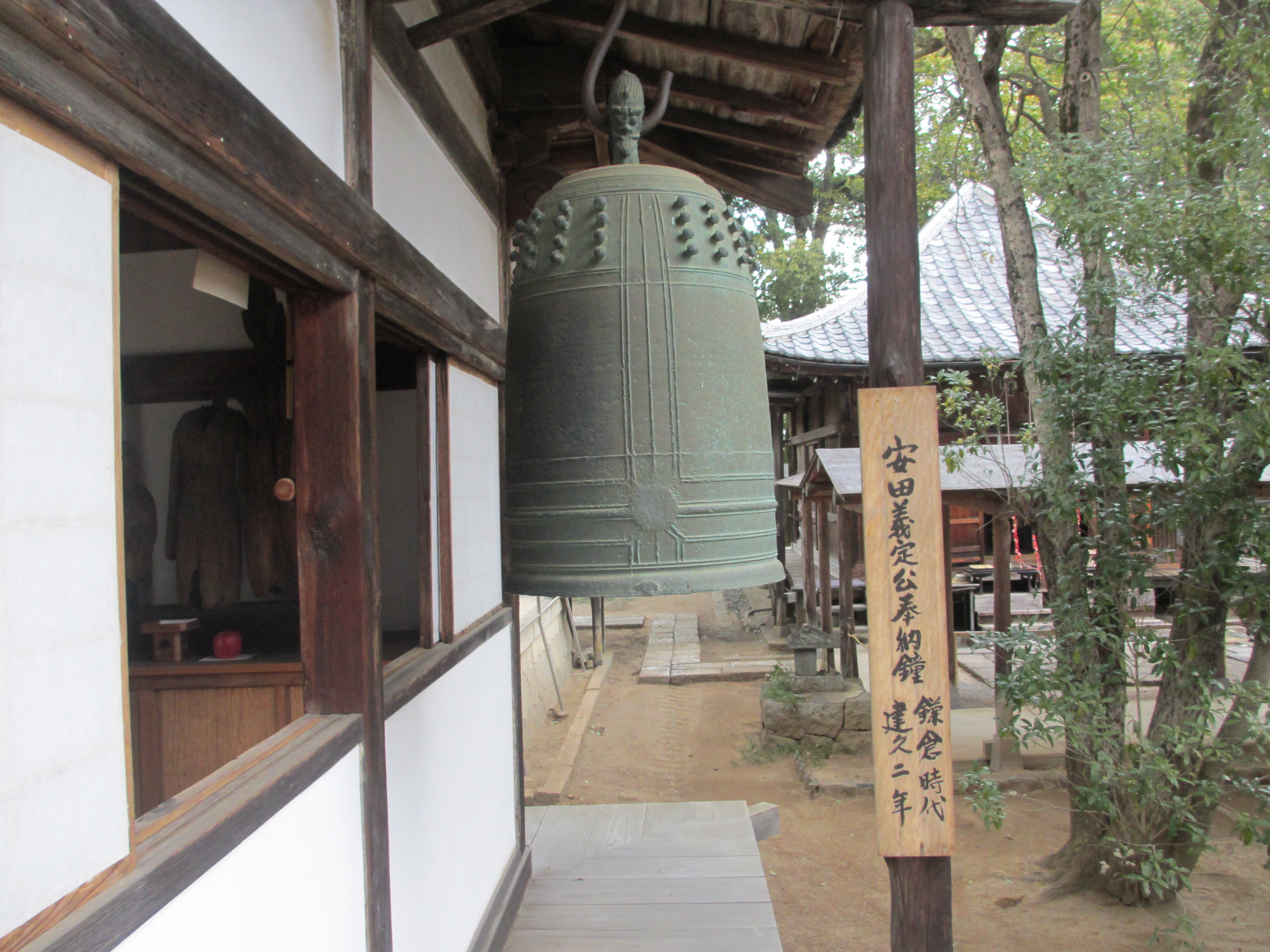
Yasuda Yoshisada Bell at Hōkō-ji temple (cast in 1191)

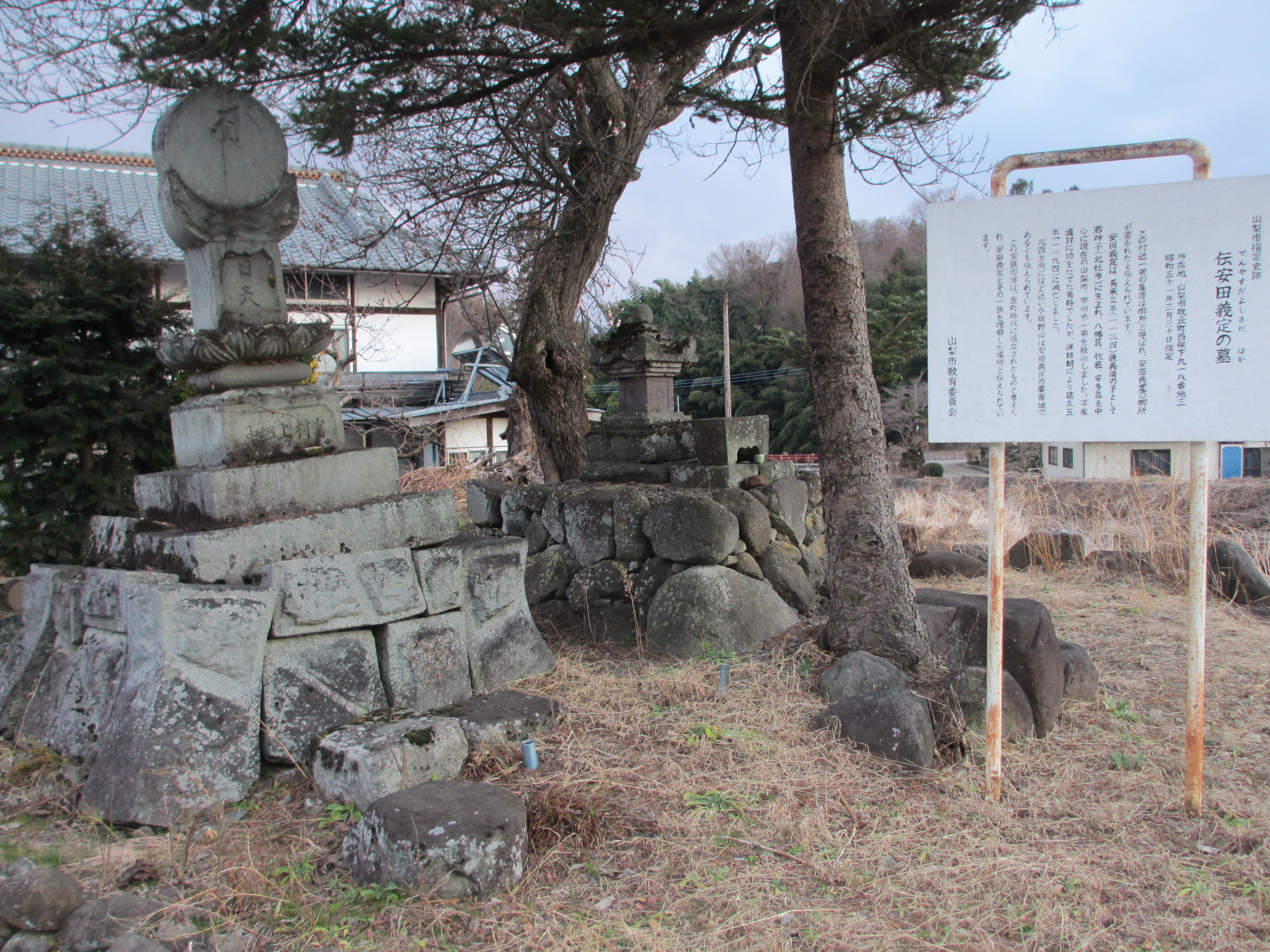
Yasuda Yoshisada's grave in Makioka, Yamanashi City (Pagoda built in Muromachi period)
