= Ichijō Tadayori =

- 一条 忠頼
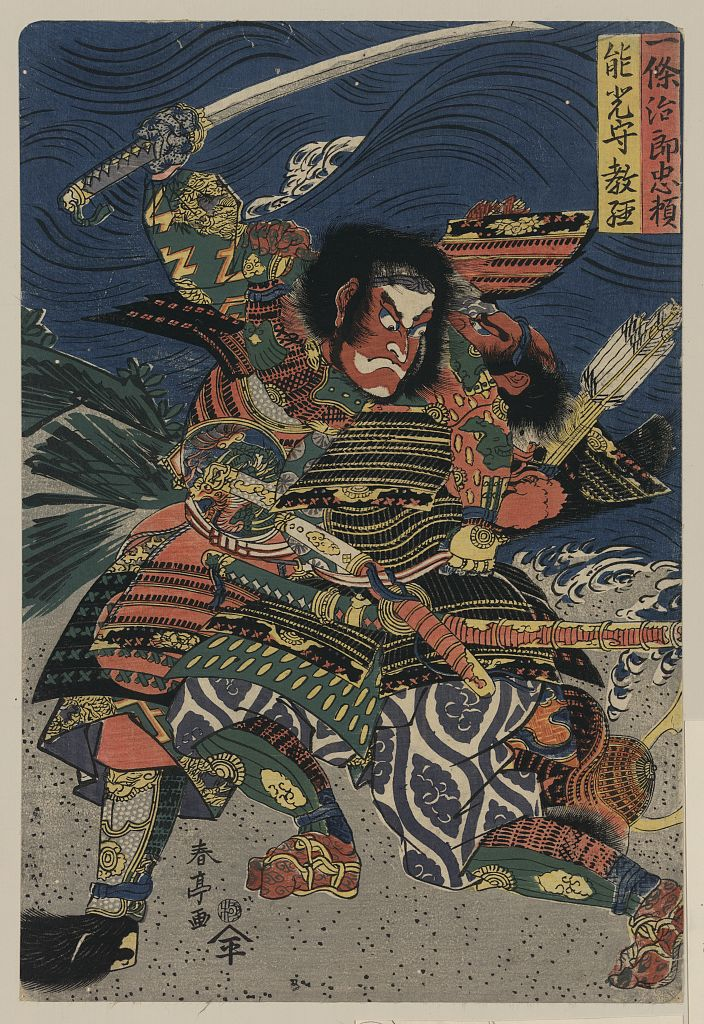
- Ichijō Tadayori fighting Taira no Noritsune (by Katsukawa Shuntei)

Governor of Musashi Province
- In office May 9, 1184 – June 6, 1184
- Monarch: Antoku
- Succeeded by: Hiraga Yoshinobu

Personal details
- Born: Unknown; Kai Province, Japan
- Died: July 25, 1184; Kamakura, Japan

Ichijō Tadayori (一条 忠頼, died July 25, 1184) was a Japanese samurai lord of the late Heian period. He served as Governor of Musashi Province and was the lord of Ichijō township in Yamanashi, Kai Province. He was the founder of the Ichijō clan. He was also known as Ichijō Jirō.

His assassination by shogun Minamoto no Yoritomo saw the beginning of the purge of the Kai branch of the Minamoto clan.

== Life ==
Ichijō Tadayori was born as the eldest son of Takeda Nobuyoshi of the Takeda clan, a branch of the Kai Minamoto clan.

In 1180, Nobuyoshi, Yasuda Yoshisada, and the Takeda clan were called to arms along with the rest of the Minamoto clan. The Kai Minamoto attacked the Taira clan of the neighboring Shinano Province, and defeating them. After that, they joined Minamoto no Yoritomo's forces in Suruga Province.

In 1184, he participated in the pursuit of Minamoto no Yoshinaka, which led to a battle and the death of Yoshinaka. Despite his contributions, Yoritomo feared Tadayori's and the Kai Minamoto clan's growing power, and ordered his assassination in 1184. Tadayori was killed at the shogunal palace by Oyamada Arishige and Amano Tōkage on July 25, 1184.

== Assassination of Tadayori ==
The Azuma Kagami only states that the reason for the assassination of Tadayori was that "despite wielding power, he has the desire to bring disorder to the world", but it lacks a concrete explanation. Looking at the political situation immediately prior to this, the death of Yoshinaka brought the first advance of the Kamakura army into Kinai, and various political negotiations had begun between the central government in Kyoto and the newly established Kamakura shogunate. Although the two parties were united in their objective to oust the Taira clan, their intentions differed on other issues. Although the Imperial Court issued a decree in 1183, it is believed that the court secretly wished to avoid further drastic delegation of authority. As a result of the negotiations, Emperor Go-Shirakawa granted Yoritomo the former territories of the Taira clan and conferred on him the court rank of Senior Fourth Rank.

In addition, in Kikki (April 2 article), the name "Saemon-no-jō Minamoto no Koreyoshi" appears in the ceremony for appointing officials other than ministers, who is identified as Ōuchi Koreyoshi of the Shinano Minamoto clan. Koreyoshi was first seen in Engyōbon Heike Monogatari during the pursuit of Minamoto no Yoshinaka and in Azuma Kagami in the Battle of Ichinotani, and it is unclear when he was appointed to the post of Saemon-no-jō. The Imperial Court would not have had time to make appointments until the postwar process was completed, so it is reasonable to interpret that he was appointed on the same March 27 (May 9 in new calendar) as Yoritomo, but resigned immediately.

The details of the appointments are not clear, as the March portion of the Kikki has not survived. However, if the appointments on March 27 were not limited to Yoritomo, but was intended for the generals who participated in the assassination of Yoshinaka, it is highly possible that Tadayori was also honored with an appointment. In this case, Yasuda Yoshisada was appointed as Governor of Tōtōmi Province in the previous year, which suggests that Tadayori was also appointed to a governorial post. According to Sonpi Bunmyaku, Tadayori was indeed appointed Governor Musashi Province. Although his appointment cannot be fully ascertained by this statement, if the Imperial Court had an intention to conciliate the Kai Minamoto clan as a counterweight to Yoritomo and Tadayori also had a desire to expand his power into the Musashi Province, a neighboring province of Kai, the appointment would make sense and its probability would be high. For Yoritomo, however, this would be the same as denying him effective control over Musashi, and it is assumed that he would have found this appointment unacceptable.

The Engyōbon Heike Monogatari states, "Tadayori was killed on April 26, and Yasuda Yoshisada went down to Kai to kill Takeda Nobuyoshi", which is a different account from the Azuma Kagami. If we follow the dates of Engyōbon Heike Monogatari, it can be seen that Tadayori was appointed to the post of Governor of Musashi Province on March 27, was killed on April 26 (June 6 in new calendar), and Minamoto no Hirotsuna was appointed Governor of Suruga Province and Hiraga Yoshinobu was appointed Governor of Musashi Province on June 5, which all lead to a single line of succession. Suruga was a province that Tadayori effectively controlled, and with the assassination of Tadayori, Yoritomo seized control of the province.

The Azuma Kagami (May 1 article) states that a military force was dispatched from Kamakura to kill the ruling clique following the execution of Minamoto no Yoshitaka, the son of Yoshinaka. Retainers (gokenin) from provinces other than Shimōsa Province were also summoned for this large-scale hunt for the remaining members. In addition, the armies of Ashikaga Yoshikane and Ogasawara Nagakiyo had also attacked Kai Province. Combined with the account of Yasuda Yoshisada's departure to Kai Province in Engyōbon Heike Monogatari, this can be concluded as a military action to completely purge the Kai Minamoto clan, which began at the same time as the assassination of Tadayori.

== Gallery ==
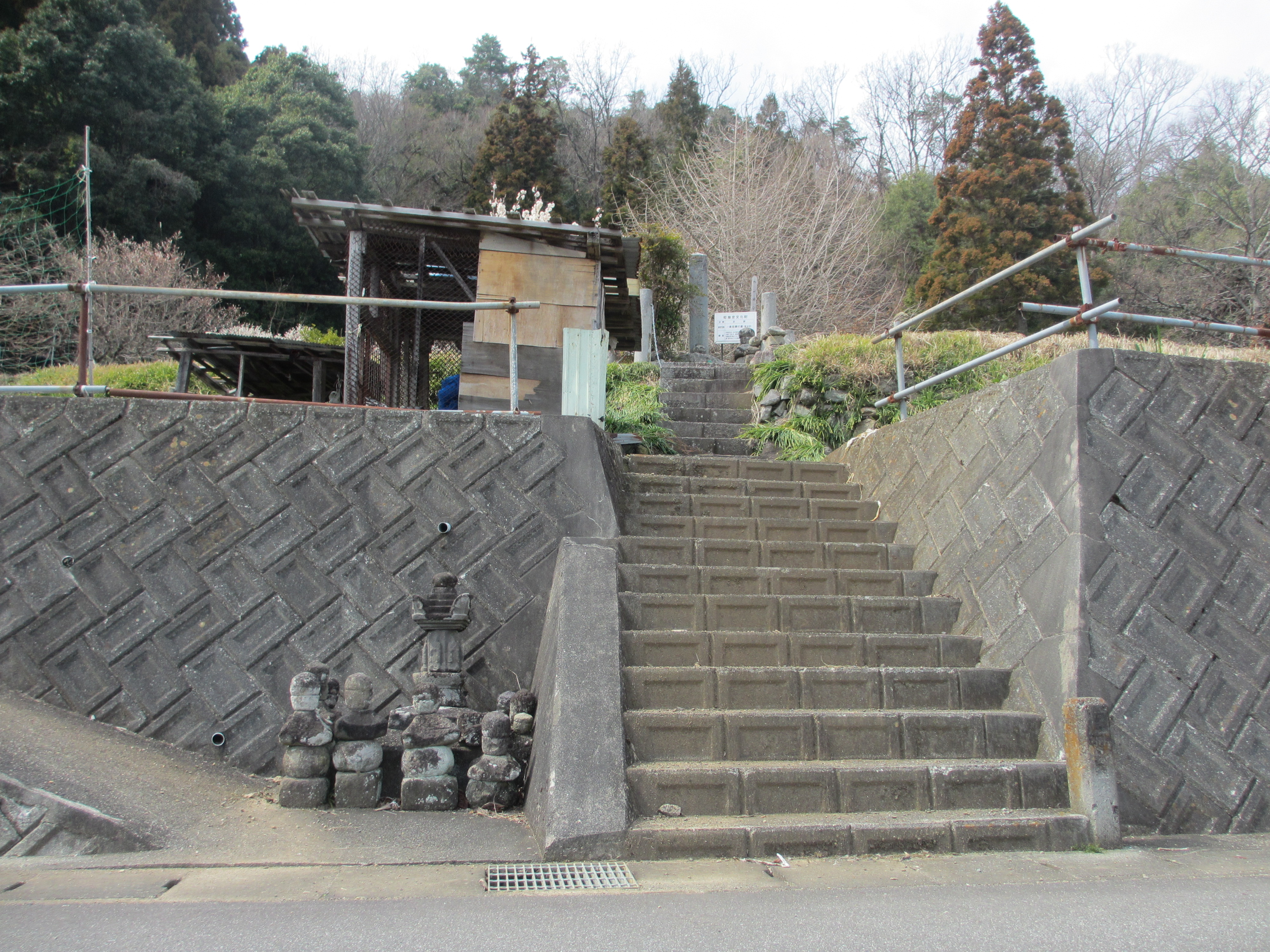
Ichijō Tadayori's grave in Fujikawa, Yamanashi Prefecture

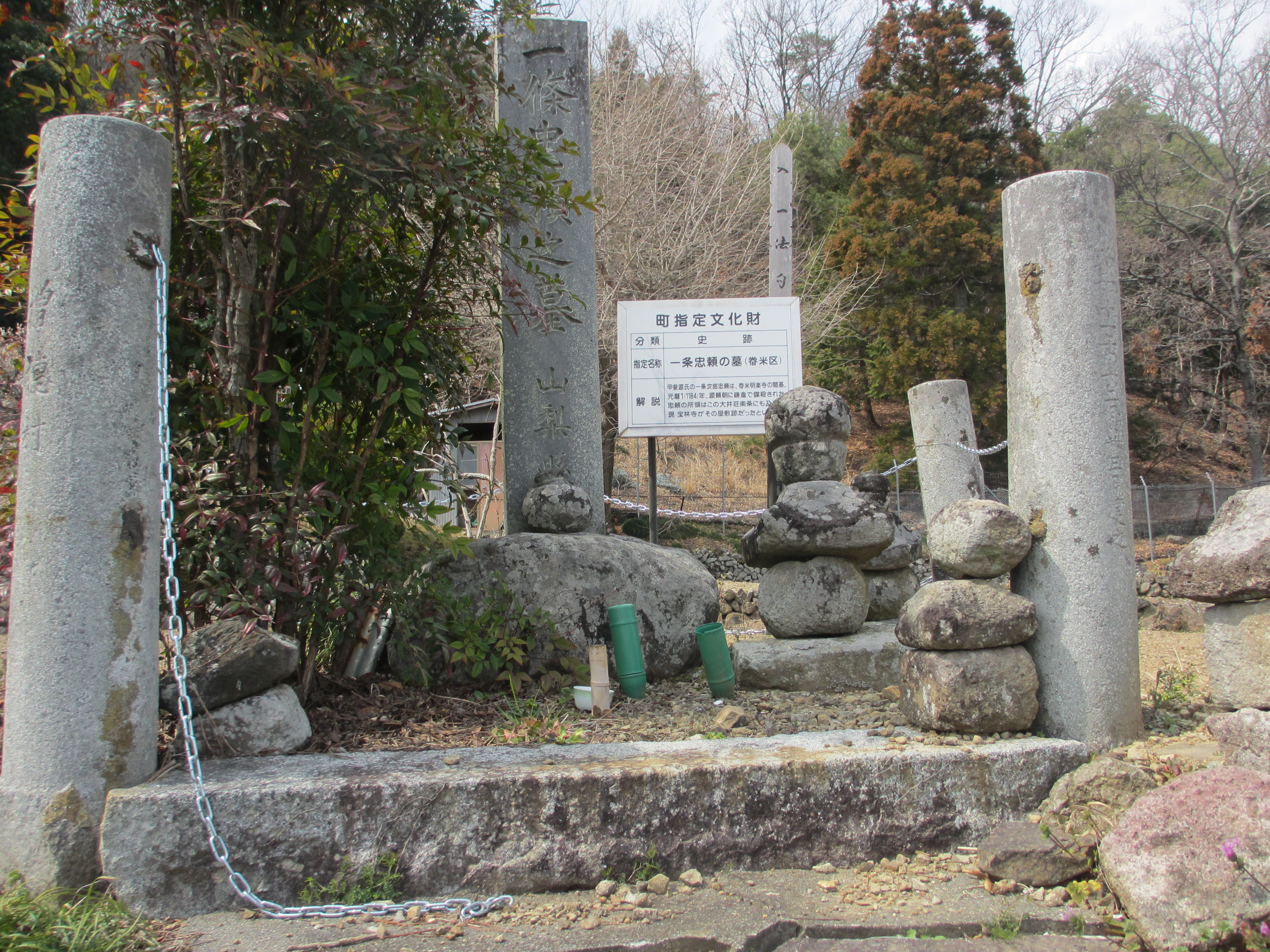
Ichijō Tadayori's grave

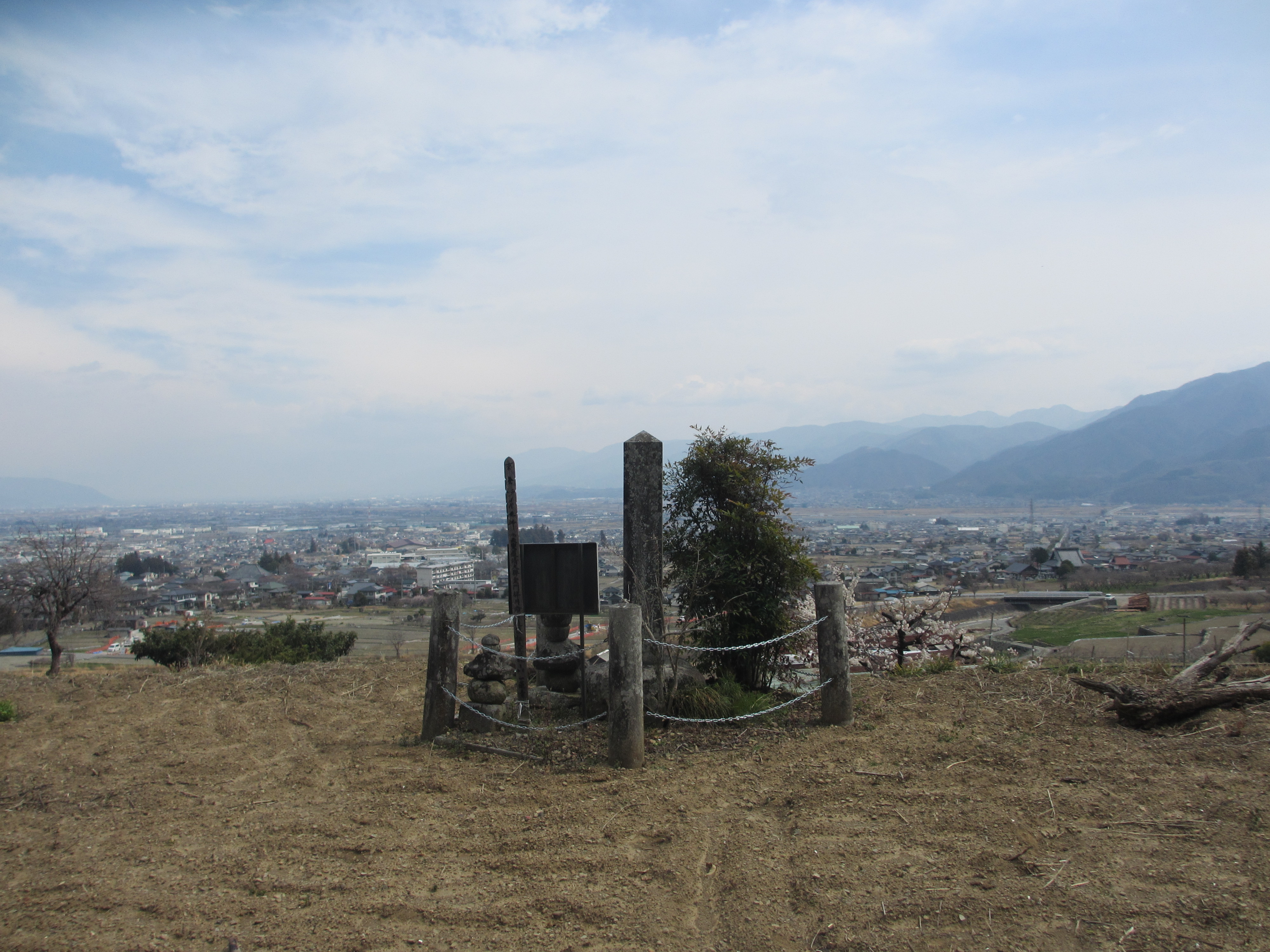
View of the Kōfu Basin from Ichijō Tadayori's grave

== See also ==
- Minamoto clan
- Kamakura shogunate
- Kai Province
