= Hitachi Province =

Former province of Japan

Hitachi Province 常陸国
- Province of Japan
- 7th century–1871
- Map of Japanese provinces (1868) with Hitachi Province highlighted
- Capital: Hitachi Kokufu and Mito
- History
  - Established: 7th century
  - Disestablished: 1871
Succeeded by
Ibaraki Prefecture
- Today part of: Ibaraki Prefecture

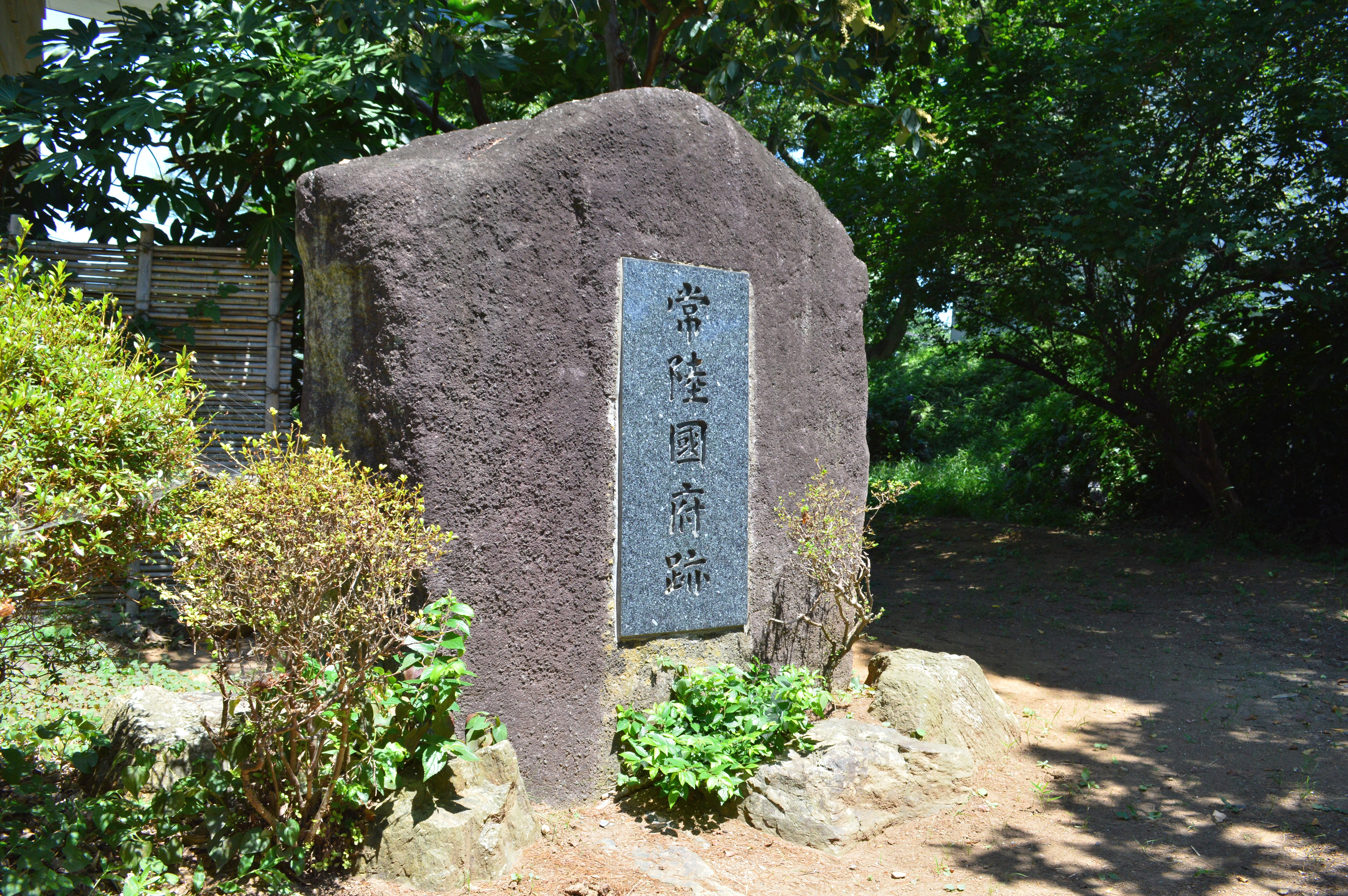
Hitachi Kokufu Ruins Stone Monument in Ishioka

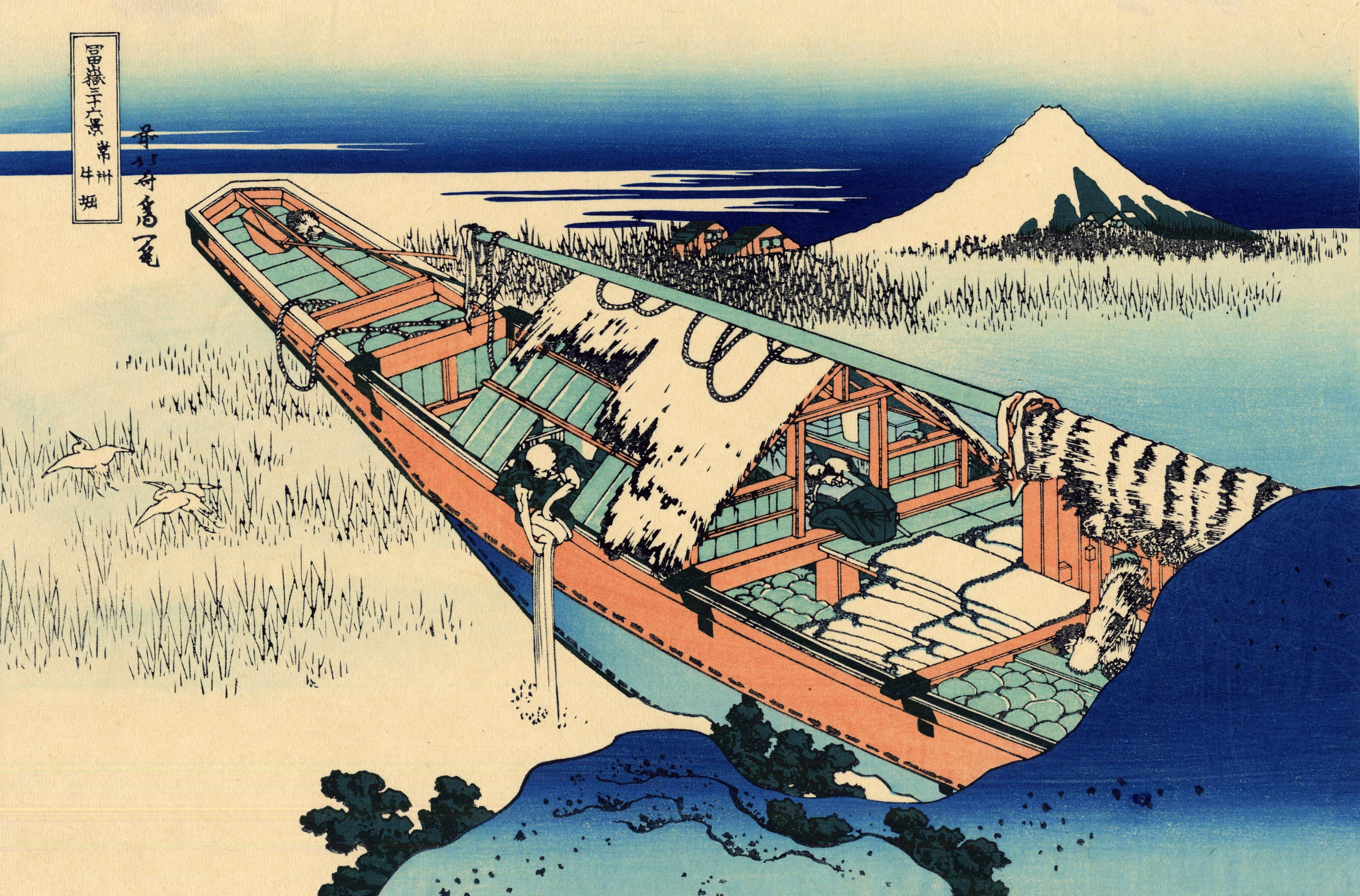
View of Hitachi Province, Hokusai woodcut in 1830

Hitachi Province (常陸国, Hitachi no Kuni; Japanese pronunciation: [çi̥.tä̀.c̟͡ɕì (nò̞ kɯ̈̀.ɲ̟ì), -tä́.c̟͡ɕì (nò̞ kɯ̈̀.ɲ̟ì)]) was an old province of Japan in the area of Ibaraki Prefecture. It was sometimes called Jōshū (常州). Hitachi Province bordered on Shimōsa (Lower Fusa), Shimotsuke, and Mutsu (Iwase (718), Iwashiro (1869), Iwaki (718) and (1868)) Provinces. Generally, its northern border was with Mutsu.

== History ==
The ancient provincial capital (Hitachi Kokufu) and temple (Hitachi Kokubun-ji) were located near modern Ishioka and have been excavated, while the chief shrine was further east at Kashima (Kashima Shrine). The province was established in the 7th century.

In the Sengoku period the area was divided among several daimyōs, but the chief castle was usually in the Mito Castle of the modern city of Mito.

In Edo period, one of the clans originating from Tokugawa Ieyasu, settled in the Mito Domain, known as Mito Tokugawa family or Mito Clan. Mito Domain, was a Japanese domain of the Edo period it was associated with Hitachi Province.

In Meiji era the political maps of the provinces of Japan were reformed in the 1870s, and the provinces became prefectures, and also some provinces were modified or merged, when creating the prefectures.

== Historical districts ==
- Ibaraki Prefecture
  - Ibaraki District (茨城郡) - dissolved
    - Higashiibaraki District (東茨城郡)
    - Nishiibaraki District (西茨城郡) - dissolved
  - Kashima District (鹿島郡) - dissolved
  - Kōchi District (河内郡, こうちぐん、かわちぐん (Kōchi-gun, Kawachi-gun)) - merged with Shida District to become Inashiki District (稲敷郡) on March 29, 1896 - Kōchi dissolved
  - Kuji District (久慈郡)
  - Makabe District (真壁郡) - dissolved
  - Naka District (那珂郡)
  - Namegata District (行方郡) - dissolved
  - Niihari District (新治郡) - dissolved
  - Shida District (信太郡) - merged with Kōchi District to become Inashiki District on March 29, 1896 - Shida dissolved
  - Taga District (多賀郡) - dissolved
  - Tsukuba District (筑波郡) - dissolved

== History books about Japan ==
Two renowned history books about Japan were written in this province:

- Dai Nihonshi (Great History of Japan), in the 17th century Tokugawa Mitsukuni beginning his composition, work was continued until its completion in the Meiji era.
- Jinnō Shōtōki (Chronicles of the Authentic Lineages of the Divine Emperors), in the 14th century Kitabatake Chikafusa in the Oda Castle wrote it.
