= Edo clan =

The Edo clan (Japanese: 江戸氏, Edo-shi) was a Japanese samurai family who first fortified the settlement known as Edo, which would later become Tokyo. The Imperial Palace now stands at this location.

The clan was a branch of the Taira clan. During the Azuchi–Momoyama period, the clan was renamed the Kitami clan.

== History ==
The clan originated in Chichibu in Musashi Province (now Saitama Prefecture). In the late 12th century, Edo Shigetsugu moved south and fortified the little hill at Edo, located where the Sumida River enters Tokyo Bay. This area later became the Honmaru and Ninomaru portions of Edo Castle. There, the Edo grew in military strength under the second patriarch, Edo Shigenaga.

In August 1180, Shigenaga attacked Muira Yoshizumi, an ally of the rival Minamoto clan. Three months later, he switched sides just as Minamoto no Yoritomo entered Musashi. Shigenaga assisted the Minamoto in overthrowing the Taira clan in Kyoto. In return, Yoritomo granted Shigenaga seven new estates in Musashi Province, including Kitami in what is now Tokyo's western Setagaya Ward.

Records show that in 1457, Edo Shigeyasu surrendered his main base at Edo to Ōta Dōkan. Dokan was a vassal of the powerful Ōgigayatsu branch of the Uesugi clan under Uesugi Sadamasa. Sadamasa was the Kanto-Kanrei for the Ashikaga. Dokan built Edo Castle on the site. The Edo clan then moved to Kitami.

In 1593, in a pledge of obedience to Tokugawa Ieyasu, Edo Katsutada changed the clan name to Kitami. Katsutada was employed by the first and second Tokugawa shōguns, reaching the position of Magistrate of Sakai, south of Osaka. Katsutada's grandson-in-law, Shigemasa, found favor with the fifth shōgun Tokugawa Tsunayoshi. He rose from the position of hatamoto, with a stipend of one thousand koku, to sobayonin, or "Grand Chamberlain", with a stipend of twenty thousand. It was an influential post, responsible for relaying messages between the shōgun and his senior councilors. He was also awarded a large domain in 1686. However, the clan's fortunes suddenly plummeted. In 1689, Shigemasa's nephew violated the shogunate taboo on bloodshed. Shigemasa had to forfeit his status and property and was banished to Ise, where he died in 1693 at age 36. The 500-year-old Edo clan essentially ceased as a recognized clan.

Tombstones of several generations of the clan are at Keigen-ji, a Buddhist temple founded in 1186 by Edo Shigenaga, in Kitami.
