= Edo Shigenaga =

Edo Shigenaga (江戸重長) was a Japanese samurai lord and gokenin in the late Heian and early Kamakura period, who was the second head of the Edo clan. He was also known as Edo Taro.

Shigenaga was the son of Edo Shiro Shigetsugu, who is the namesake of Edo, the former name of Tokyo. In 1180, Shigenaga was asked by Minamoto no Yoritomo to cooperate in his uprising against the rule of the Taira clan in Kyoto. Hesitant at first, Shigenaga eventually helped Yoritomo overthrow the Taira rule. Yoritomo granted Shigenaga seven new estates in Musashi Province, including Kitami in what is now Tokyo's western Setagaya Ward.
