= Kazusa Hirotsune =

Samurai lord

Kazusa Hirotsune 上総広常
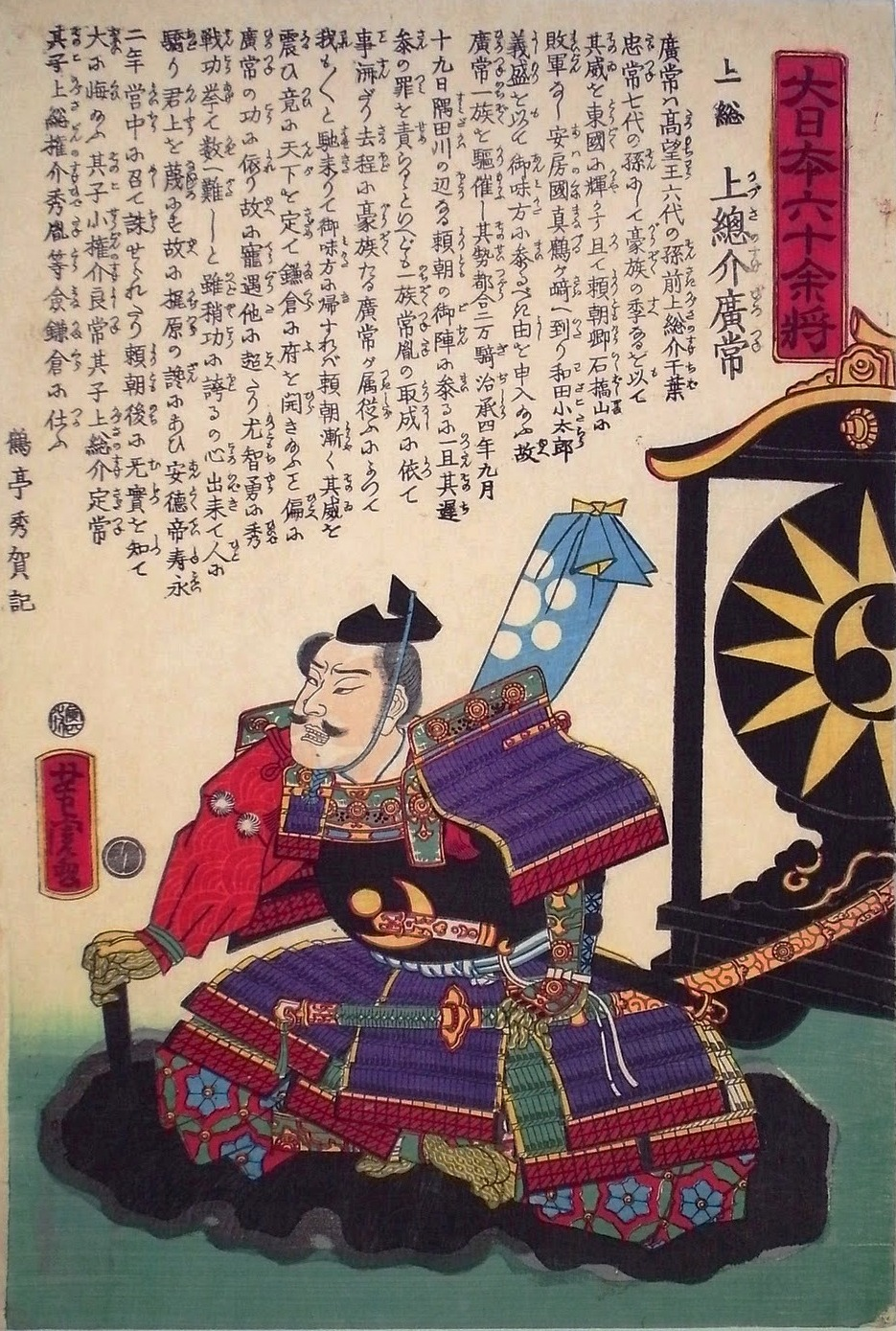
- Kazusa Hirotsune (woodblock print by Utagawa Yoshitora)
- Born: Unknown
- Died: 1183
- Other names: Kazusa-no-suke Hirotsune
- Occupation: samurai
- Father: Taira no Tsunezumi

Kazusa Hirotsune (上総 広常, died 1183) was a samurai lord and gōzoku in Kantō during the late Heian period. He was the head of the Bōsō Taira clan and fought against the Taira clan on Minamoto clan's side during the Genpei War. He is commonly also known as Kazusa-no-suke Hirotsune, in which "Kazusa-no-suke" (Vice Governor of Kazusa Province) indicates his office.

== Life ==
Kazusa Hirotsune was born in Kazusa Province, the son of Taira no Tsunezumi, a local government official.

As his father had raised Minamoto no Yoshitomo, Hirotsune began his service under Yoshitomo and entered the capital of Kyoto.

In 1156 Hirotsune participated in the Hōgen rebellion, and after this, he mainly focused on unifying the Taira clan in Bōsō Peninsula.

In 1179 as a result of the coup d'état of Taira no Kiyomori, the head of the Taira clan, Kazusa became the domain of Fujiwara no Tadakiyo, a Taira clan retainer. This resulted in a conflict between the local Taira and the Taira clan in Kyoto, and ultimately the disownment of Hirotsune and his family by Kiyomori.

Hirotsune was a prominent gōzoku figure in the Kantō region during Minamoto no Yoritomo's call to arms. In 1180, Hirotsune joined Minamoto no Yoritomo, who had lost the Battle of Ishibashiyama and planned a second attempt against the Taira clan in Awa Province. In Azuma Kagami, it is said that Hirotsune joined Yoritomo with an army of 20,000 cavalrymen. However, in Engyōbon Heike Monogatari the number of cavalrymen is said to be 10,000, and in Genpei Tōjōroku the number is said to be 1,000. This army is said to have given Yoritomo the advantage needed to defeat the Taira clan. Furthermore, Hirotsune considered killing Yoritomo if he deemed Yoritomo unfit as a leader.

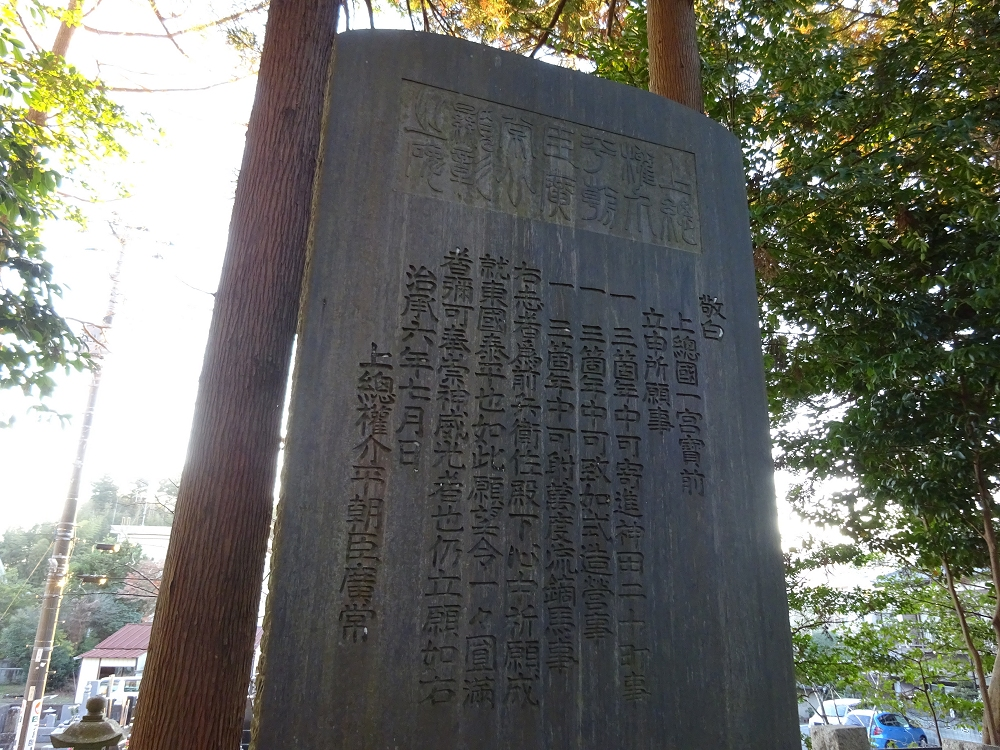
Hirotsune's prayer at Tamasaki Shrine in Ichinomiya, Chiba Prefecture

Historian Minoru Noguchi has concluded based on records of Hirotsune in Azuma Kagami that Hirotsune was on Yoritomo's side from the beginning. Hirotsune's reply to Yoritomo's messenger before Yoritomo's call to arms was an immediate approval, but it would have been impossible for him to have joined the war until late August considering that he traveled on a ship. According to historian Yūichi Goza, Yoritomo was able to travel from Awa to Kazusa Province because Hirotsune had been on his side from the beginning and had defeated the Taira forces in the area enabling the mobilizing of Yoritomo's army.

In October 1180, Yoritomo planned to set off to Kyoto after victory at the Battle of Fujigawa. However, Hirotsune persuaded Yoritomo to stay in Kantō to save Yoritomo from a defeat similar to that of Minamoto no Yoshinaka.

Hirotsune later came to conflict with Yoritomo who had established a samurai government but attached importance to the Imperial Court in Kyoto. Furthermore, animosity against Hirotsune grew among Yoritomo's retainers after Hirotsune ignored Yoritomo by not getting off his horse to greet Yoritomo.

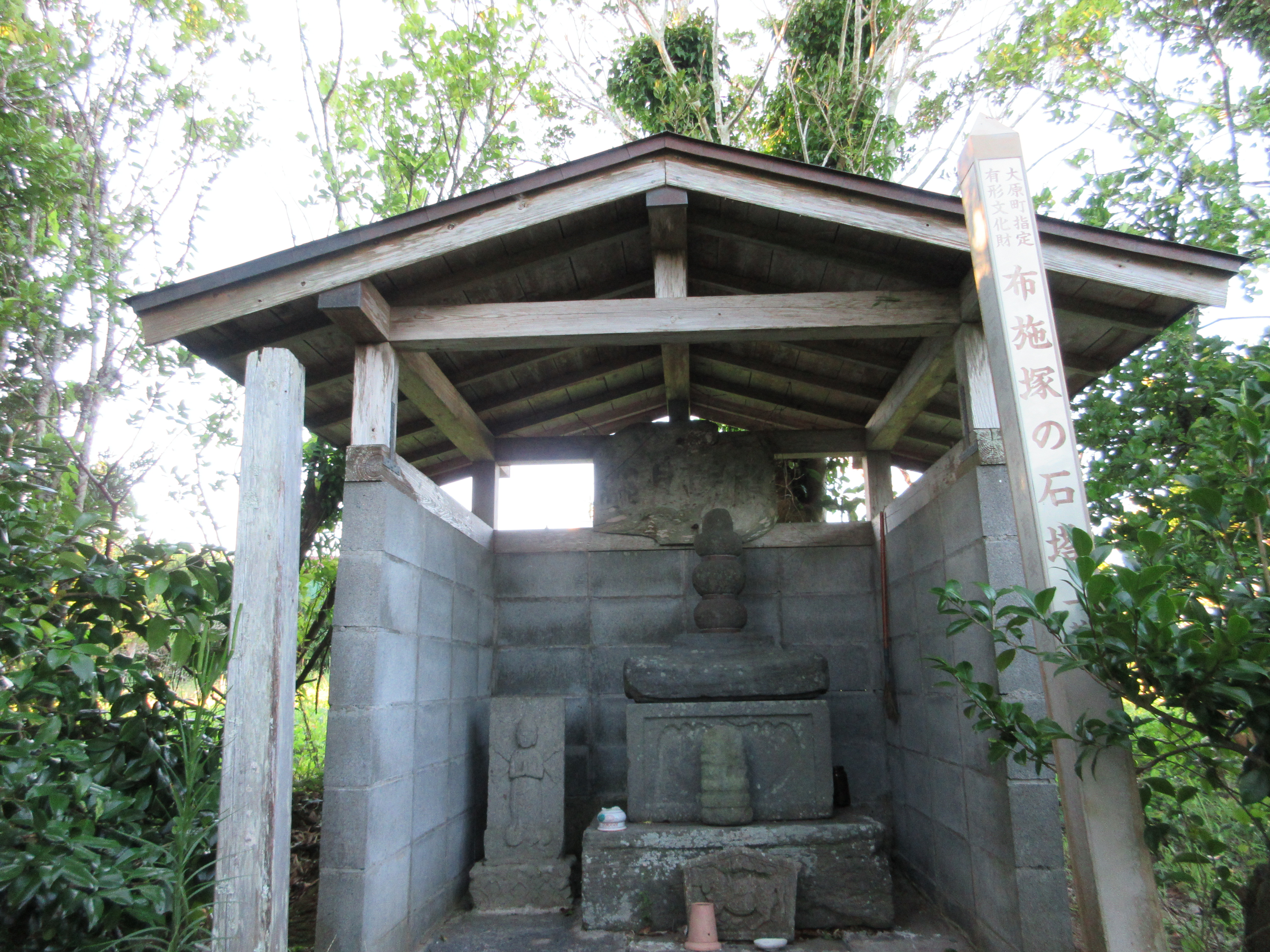
Fusezuka Pagoda in Isumi, Chiba Prefecture is said to be a memorial reliquary of Hirotsune

Hirotsune and his eldest son Yoshitsune were assassinated by Kajiwara Kagetoki in 1183, upon the request of Yoritomo who had suspected him of conspiracy. However, Hirotsune was later found to be innocent and his honor was restored.

== See also ==
- Genpei War
- Azuma Kagami
- Kajiwara Kagetoki
