= Hitachi Kokufu =

Hitachi Kokufu ruins
- 常陸国府跡 (Japanese)
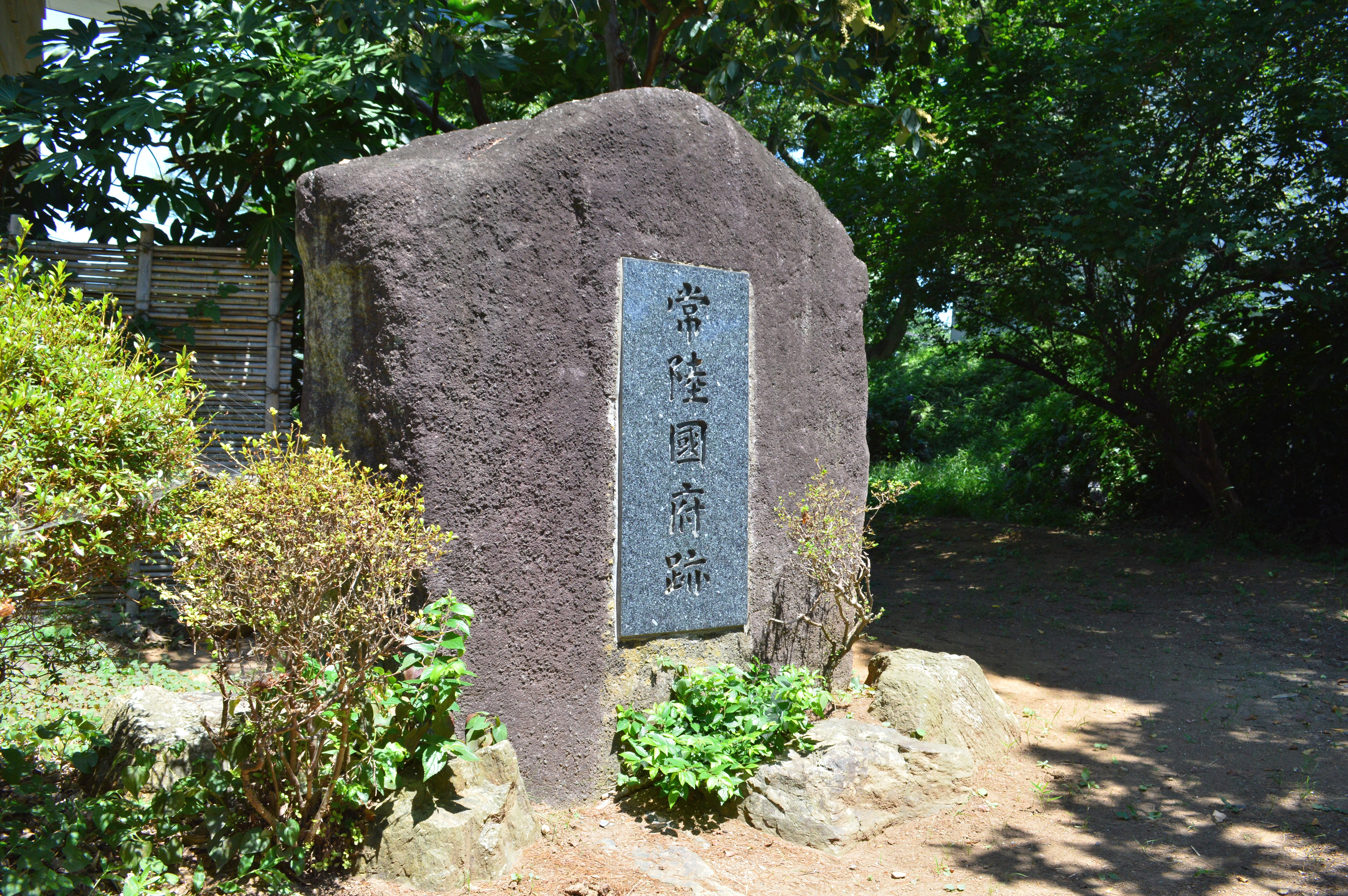
- Hitachi Kokufu ruins

- Hitachi Kokufu ruins Hitachi Kokufu (Japan)
- 36°10′3.83″N 140°17′22.66″E
- Periods: Nara to Heian period
- Location: Ishioka, Ibaraki, Japan
- Region: Kantō region

History
- Built: mid 7th century AD

Site notes
- Elevation: 10 m (33 ft)
- Excavation dates: 1998 to 1999 and 2001 to 2007
- Discovered: 1990
- Public access: No

The Hitachi Kokufu (常陸国府) was the provincial capital of Hitachi Province in the late Nara period though Heian period. It was located in the Soja neighborhood of the city of Ishioka, Ibaraki Prefecture in the northern Kantō region of Japan. The ruins have been protected as a National Historic Site since 2010.

== History ==
In the Nara period, after the Taika Reform (645 AD) and centralization of the administration of Japan following Chinese models (the Ritsuryō system), the nation was divided into provinces, each with an official capital constructed per a uniform layout and standard, and headed by an appointed kokushi, who replaced the older Kuni no miyatsuko. With a square layout, the provincial capital mirrored the layout of Fujiwara-kyō and then Heijō-kyō, which in turn were modeled on the Tang capital Chang'an. Each had office buildings for administration, finance, police and military and the official building of the governor, as well as granaries for tax rice and other taxable produce. In the periphery there was the provincial temple (kokubun-ji), and nunnery (kokubun-niji) and the garrison. This system collapsed with the growth of feudalism in the late Heian period, and the locations of many of the provincial capitals is now lost.

== Description ==
The Hitachi Kokufu archaeological site is located on the Ishioka plateau formed by the Sanno River and Koise River which flow into Lake Kasumigaura. This area has a dense concentration of kofun tumuli, and is believed to have been the center of the Hitachi kingdom before it was fully incorporated into the Yamato state. The earliest rulers of the area, the Kuni no miyatsuko include Kudara-no-kuni Kishi Empo (百済王遠宝) (d.734), indicating a connection with the royal house of Baekje, many of whose members fled as refugees to Japan after the defeat of Baekje by the Tang-Silla alliance in 660 AD. The ruins were discovered in the schoolyard of Ishioka Elementary School during the rebuilding of the school building in 1970. The preliminary excavation survey in 1970 discovered the foundations of large north and south wing buildings, and many roof tiles with inscriptions were excavated, confirming the remains to be that of the Hitachi provincial capital. As a result of the excavations from 1998 to 1999 and from 2001 to 2007 the complete outlines of the layout became clear and the site was designated as a National Historic Site in 2010. The artifacts found all date from the end of the 7th century to the 11th century, and indicate that there were five major reconstructions over its history.

In the first half of the 8th century, the layout of the buildings changed drastically, and the buildings were re-arranged from a straight layout to a U-shaped layout within a 100-meter square inner enclosure protected by a palisade. This layout continued for about 300 years with the size of the main building expanding into a seven bay hall, and the type of buildings changing to foundation-stone supported pillars from pillars buried directly in the soil. From the 10th century onwards, the outer enclosure disappeared, but the 8th-century east-to-west moat with a width of about 4 meters was retained. The complex was destroyed during the Tengyō no Ran (Taira no Masakado rebellion) of 939 AD and appears to have been abandoned some time thereafter.

The site is located about 13 minutes on foot from Ishioka Station on the JR East Jōban Line. The site has been backfilled, and the school constructed over the ruins, so nothing remains visible at the site.

== See also ==
- List of Historic Sites of Japan (Ibaraki)
