= Battle of Ishibashiyama =

1180 battle of the Genpei War

- Part of the Genpei War
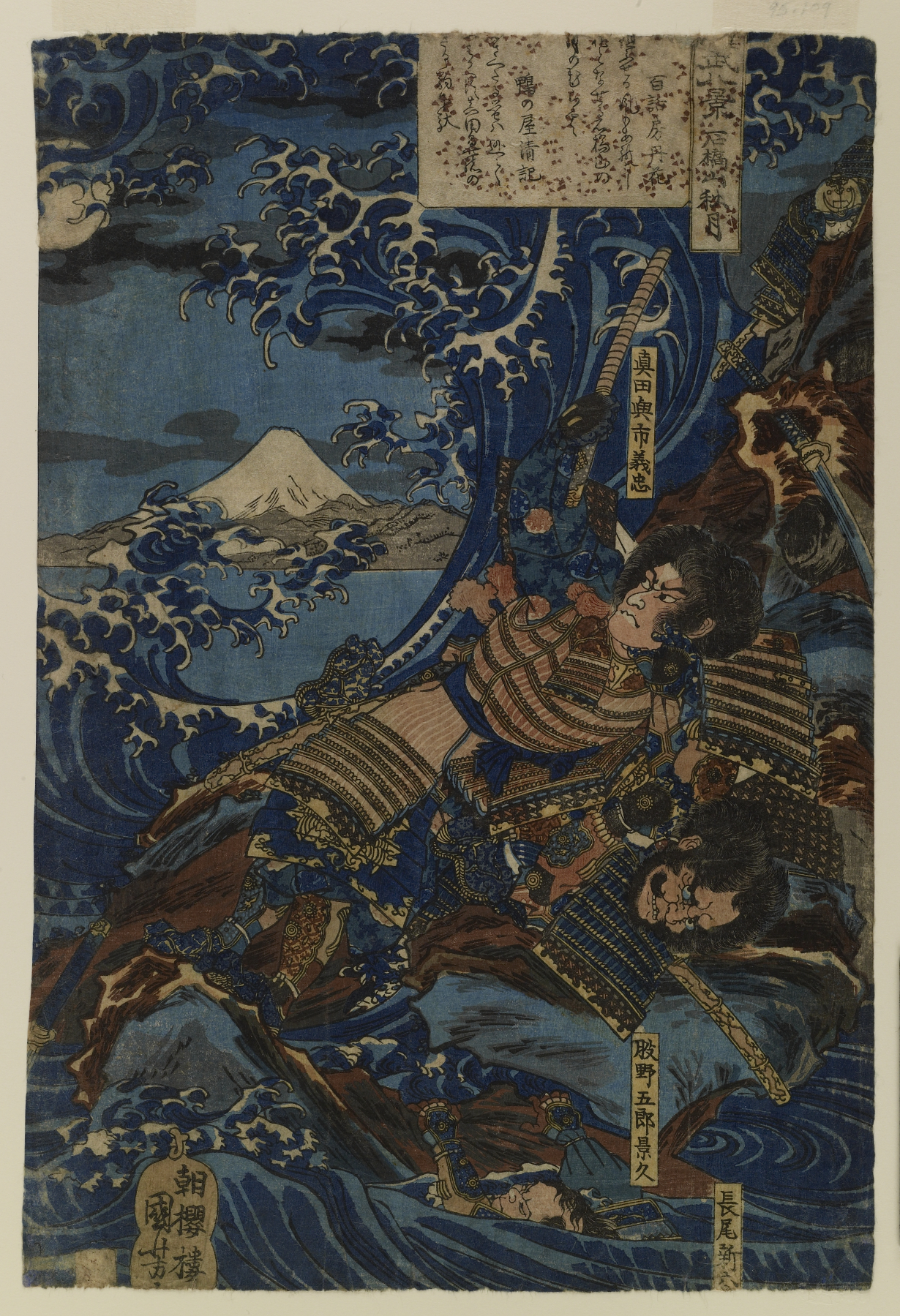
- A 19th-century depiction of combat on the rocky shore at Ishibashiyama
Date	August 24, 1180 (Jishō calendar) September 14, 1180 (Gregorian calendar)
Location	Ishibashiyama, in the Hakone Mountains, near Mount Fuji in present-day Odawara, Kanagawa Prefecture 35.221111°N 139.140306°E
Result	Taira victory

Belligerents
Minamoto clan	Taira clan

Commanders and leaders
Minamoto no Yoritomo	Ōba Kagechika; Itō Sukechika

Strength
300	3,000

Casualties and losses
Unknown	Unknown

The Battle of Ishibashiyama (石橋山の戦い, Ishibashiyama no tatakai) (referred to as the Battle of Kobayakawa in the Gikeiki) was fought on August 24th, 1180 (Jishō calendar) or September 14th, 1180 (Gregorian calendar) at the end of the Heian period between Minamoto no Yoritomo, who became the first shōgun of Japan less than a decade later, and the forces of the Taira clan, including Ōba Kagechika. It was the first battle in which Yoritomo was commander of the Minamoto forces.

The battle was fought in the southwest of present-day Odawara, Kanagawa Prefecture, near Yoritomo's headquarters at Kamakura. The Minamoto army, consisting of 300 cavalry, positioned themselves on Ishibashiyama, while the Taira army, numbering 3000 cavalry, deployed across a valley. Minamoto no Yoritomo suffered a crushing defeat and fled into the Hakone Mountains, then escaped by boat to Awa Province and regrouped.

== Background ==
Minamoto no Yoshitomo, Yoritomo's father, was killed in the Heiji Rebellion of 1160 in which the Minamoto clan rose against the Taira clan. Minamoto no Yoritomo, then only thirteen years old, was exiled by Taira no Kiyomori, the leader of the Taira clan. Yoritomo spent 20 years as an exile, reportedly devoting himself to Buddhist scripture recitation. During this time, Yoritomo married Hōjō Masako, the daughter of Hōjō Tokimasa. The Hōjō clan, a powerful clan in Izu Province, became Yoritomo's protectors during his exile and supported his claim to leadership of the Minamoto clan.

In the following years, the Taira clan attempted to consolidate their position, eventually forcing the Emperor Takakura to abdicate in favour of his infant son, Antoku, whose mother was a Taira. Prince Mochihito, brother of Emperor Takakura, felt that the Taira had denied his rightful claim to the throne and in May 1180 issued an appeal to the Minamoto and Fujiwara clans to rise against the Taira.

The plan was discovered prematurely and Prince Mochihito and his ally Minamoto no Yorimasa of the Settsu Minamoto clan were pursued and killed by the Taira clan. On June 19th, Miyoshi Yasunobu of Kyoto (the son of the sister of Yoritomo's wet nurse) sent an urgent message warning that the Taira clan was planning to pursue and eliminate the Minamoto clan throughout the provinces, and that they should immediately flee to the Ōshū Fujiwara clan.

Yoritomo looked for support from the Miura and Chiba clans, offshoots of the Taira Clan that had been oppressed by Taira-affiliated officials as the Taira Clan exerted dominance over Izu province. He also instructed Adachi Morinaga to determine the intentions of the Minamoto family's hereditary retainers. Hatano Yoshitsune was hesitant to respond, and Yamauchi Shudo Tsunetoshi even scoffed, saying, "For Lord Yoritomo to try to defeat the Taira clan is like trying to measure the height of Mount Fuji or a mouse trying to catch a cat." However, Ōba Kageyoshi (Ōba Kagechika's older brother) readily agreed, and the elderly Miura Yoshiaki wept with joy, gathering his family to show them the official document and confirming their allegiance. Chiba Tsunetane and Kazusa Hirotsune also all agreed.

== Attack on Yamaki Manor ==
Yoritomo, relying on diviners' calculations, decided to wait until August 17th (September 8th in the Gregorian calendar) to raise an army. He also chose to make his first attack against Yamaki Kanetaka, the deputy governor of Izu Province, who had pushed the Hōjō and Kudo clans out of power.

Before raising the army, Yoritomo summoned Kudo Shigemitsu, Doi Sanemitsu, Okazaki Yoshizane, Amano Enkei, Sasaki Moritsuna, and Kato Kagekane one by one to his private room, held secret talks with each of them, and said, "Although I have not yet revealed this to anyone, I am telling you this because I rely solely on you." They were all pleased and encouraged, believing that they were especially trusted.

However, on the day before the uprising, the Sasaki brothers—Sasaki Sadatsuna, Tsunetaka, Moritsuna, and Takatsuna—did not arrive, and Yoritomo regretted having leaked the plan to Moritsuna. When the brothers finally arrived on the day of the uprising, exhausted from their hurried journey after having been delayed by floods, Yoritomo shed tears of gratitude for them. However, the original plan for a dawn attack was disrupted by this delay.

At this point, Yoritomo ordered that the attack on Yamaki Manor should be carried out that night, stating his resolve to "decide the fate of my life by settling the matter with Yamaki." He also ordered that Yamaki's manor be set on fire, wishing to confirm the success or failure of the attack by this means. Tokimasa suggested, "Tonight is the festival of Mishima Shrine, so Ushikuwa-oji Street will be crowded with people, and there's a risk of our attack being discovered. How about taking the side road, Hirushima-dori?" However, Yoritomo ordered, "I initially thought the same, but this is the beginning of our uprising, and we shouldn't use a side road. Also, it's difficult for cavalry to travel on Hirushima-dori. We should take the main road."

Late at night, the group set out. At Hida-hara along the way, Tokimasa ordered Sasaki Sadatsuna to separate a contingent of troops to attack Tsutsumi Nobutō, who was the guardian of Kanetaka, a skilled warrior and a rival to the Hōjō clan. The Sasaki brothers headed towards Nobutō's mansion and at midnight Tsunetaka fired an arrow at the mansion. Nobutō's retainers retaliated and an archery battle ensued. Tsunetaka discarded his bow and drew his sword, charging in and engaging Nobutō in close combat. Tsunetaka was wounded by an arrow and fell, but Sadatsuna and Takatsuna joined the fight and they finally killed Nobutō.

When Tokimasa and his main force arrived at Yamaki Manor they discovered that many of Kanetaka's retainers were away, either attending the festival at Mishima Shrine or holding a banquet at an inn by the Kise River. They unleashed a volley of arrows but faced fierce resistance from the soldiers remaining at the manor.

Yoritomo gazed into the distance towards Yamaki Manor, but saw no flames. Anxious, he sent three of his personal guards to Yamaki Manor, giving one of them a long sword, with orders to bring back Kanetaka's head. They stormed Yamaki Manor and finally killed Kanetaka, then set the manor ablaze, burning it down completely. The raiding party returned at dawn with the heads of Kanetaka and his retainers.

== Battle of Ishibashiyama ==
Even after defeating Yamaki Kanetaka, Minamoto no Yoritomo's forces were far from sufficient to control the entire province of Izu, and an attack from the Taira clan was only a matter of time. Although there was much sympathy for Yoritomo's call to arms, the clans were wary of openly supporting him, and an army of only 300 gathered at Ishibashiyama. Other allies from the Miura clan were slow to arrive due to poor weather conditions which caused the Sakawa River near Kamakura to flood.

On August 20th, Yoritomo, with only a small force, left Izu and advanced to Doi-go in Sagami Province (present-day Yugawara, Kanagawa Prefecture), the territory of Doi Sanemitsu. When Kiyomori heard that Yoritomo had left Izu Province for the Hakone Pass, he dispatched Ōba Kagechika to stop him.

Yoritomo had a force of only 300 cavalry at Ishibashiyama, where he had raised Prince Mochihito's imperial decree as his standard. A force from the Miura clan was prevented from reaching Yoritomo due to heavy rains which caused the Sakawa River near Kamakura to flood. Ōba Kagechika, by contrast, led over 3000 cavalry and enjoyed the support of Ito Sukechika, a powerful local lord of Izu Province, who advanced to the rear of Ishibashiyama with 300 cavalry, blocking Yoritomo's retreat.

According to "The Tale of the Heike", prior to the battle, Hōjō Tokimasa and Ōba Kagechika engaged in a "battle of words." Kagechika claimed to be a descendant of Kamakura Kagemasa, who had fought bravely in the Latter Three Years' War. Tokimasa retorted that if Kagechika was indeed a descendant of Kagemasa, who had once served Minamoto no Yoshiie, why was he now raising arms against Lord Yoritomo? Kagechika replied, "Even a former lord is now an enemy. The gratitude I owe to the Taira clan is higher than the mountains and deeper than the sea."

== Battle ==
As the Miura clan was advancing to join Yoritomo they set fire to the mansion of one of Ōba Kagechika's allies along the way. Seeing this from afar, Kagechika decided that he should settle the matter before the Miura forces arrived. He launched a night attack on the Minamoto camp with 3,000 men during a heavy rainstorm while Itō Sukechika attacked the Minamoto forces in the rear to cut off any avenue for retreat.

On the other hand, the Minamoto defenders were aided by members of Ōba's forces whose loyalties were questionable, and who decided to disrupt the assault against the Minamoto troops, using the dark and stormy conditions to avoid detection. Despite being greatly outnumbered, the soldiers of the Minamoto clan put up a valiant defense.

In the midst of the battle, Yoritomo's brother-in-law Hōjō Munetoki was killed. The imbalance in numbers between the two armies eventually forced Yoritomo to retreat, supposedly culminating in a last stand by Yoritomo and a single retainer by the trunk of a hollow tree. It is said that when they realized all was lost, Yoritomo and his companion hid inside the tree. Later, they are said to have been found by a Minamoto sympathizer serving in Ōba's army and then successfully smuggled out of harm's way.

== After the battle ==
The following day, the 24th, the Ōba army continued their pursuit, and the remnants of Yoritomo's army fiercely resisted in the mountains. Yoritomo himself fought with bow and arrow, demonstrating his exceptional archery skills. The scattered samurai of Yoritomo's army gradually gathered around him, and Yoritomo, standing on a fallen tree, rejoiced at their return. Doi Sanemitsu suggested that with so many people, escape would be impossible; since this was his territory, he would risk his life to hide Yoritomo alone, and everyone else should go their separate ways and await an opportunity for revenge. They all agreed, shedding tears as they parted ways. Hōjō Tokimasa and his second son, Yoshitoki, headed towards Kai Province, while his eldest son, Munetoki, took a different route, but Munetoki was surrounded and killed along the way.

The Ōba army thoroughly searched the mountains. In the army of Ōba, there was a samurai named Kajiwara Kagetoki who knew the whereabouts of Yoritomo but, out of compassion, concealed it. He guided Kagechika and others, telling them that there were no footprints on this mountain and that the mountain opposite looked suspicious, thus saving Yoritomo's life. Because of this, Kagetoki was later highly favored by Yoritomo. The Shishido Cave in Sugiyama, Doi (present-day Yugawara), is said to be the legendary site associated with this episode; it acquired that name from a bird called a "shishito" that suddenly flew out of the cave, leading Yoritomo's pursuers to believe there were no people there.

The Miura forces, which had been unable to join the Yoritomo troops due to flooding caused by heavy rain, turned back when they learned of Yoritomo's defeat. Taira soldiers and their allies pursued them to Kinugasa Castle, where they overwhelmed the Miura Clan, who were forced to abandon the castle and scatter in all directions.

Yoritomo and his followers were sheltered by Gyōjitsu, the head priest of Hakone Shrine, before Yoritomo fled by sea from Cape Manazuru to the Bōsō Peninsula in Awa Province in the south of present-day Chiba Prefecture on September 28, 1180. When Yoritomo stopped in the Ebado area of present-day Isumi on the Bōsō Peninsula, he was deeply moved when a local farmer offered him a bundle of straw to sit on as a cushion while he rested on a small hill. He then bestowed the surname "Ichikawa" (meaning "one straw") upon the farmer.

== Resuming the war against the Taira Clan ==
Yoritomo reunited with the remnants of the Miura forces and other allies in Awa Province. In September Yoritomo and his allies advanced northward through the Bōsō Peninsula, reaching the Katsushika District in Shimōsa Province by the end of September. During this time, the Anzai, Chiba, and Kazusa clans, among others, joined his forces, swelling his army to tens of thousands of cavalry. These warriors from eastern Japan advanced, defeating the Taira clan's local officials and powerful families who had been oppressing Yoritomo's allies at the Battle of Yūki Beach. Powerful warriors from Musashi Province also joined, and after crossing the Sumida River and entering Musashi Province, Yoritomo entered Kamakura on October 6th.

On October 20th, at the Battle of Fujigawa, Yoritomo, allied with the Kai Genji clan led by Takeda Nobuyoshi, defeated the forces of Taira no Koremori, who had been dispatched from Kyoto. After this, Yoritomo gradually established his hegemony in the Bando region by overcoming conflicts with powerful families who did not submit to him, such as the Satake and Nitta clans.

Ōba Kagechika and Ito Sukechika, who had defeated Yoritomo at the Battle of Ishibashiyama, attempted to join the Taira forces but failed. Kagechika surrendered but was not pardoned and was executed, while Sukechika was captured and committed suicide. Hatano Yoshitsune also committed suicide after being pursued by Yoritomo's forces.

Yoritomo ultimately defeated both the Taira Clan and his rivals within the Minamoto Clan, going on to establish the first shogunate (bakufu) at Kamakura, thus beginning the feudal age in Japan, which lasted until the 17th century.
