= Takeda Nobuyoshi (1128–1186) =

Japanese samurai (1128–1194)

- 武田 信義
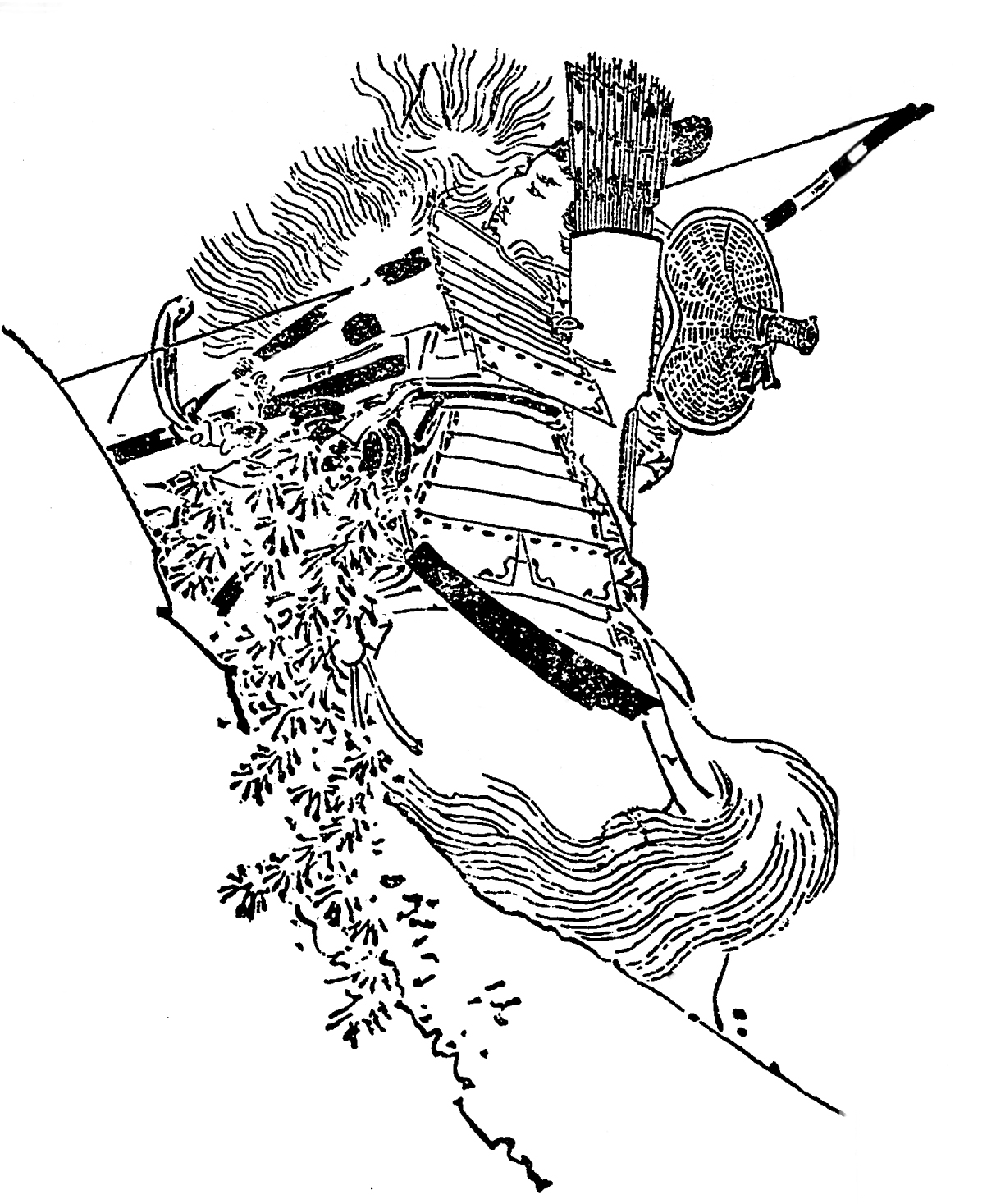
- Takeda Nobuyoshi by Kikuchi Yōsai

Governor of Suruga Province
- In office 1180 – March 31, 1186
- Monarchs: Antoku; Go-Toba

Personal details
- Born: September 11, 1128
- Died: March 31, 1186 (aged 59) or later than 1194

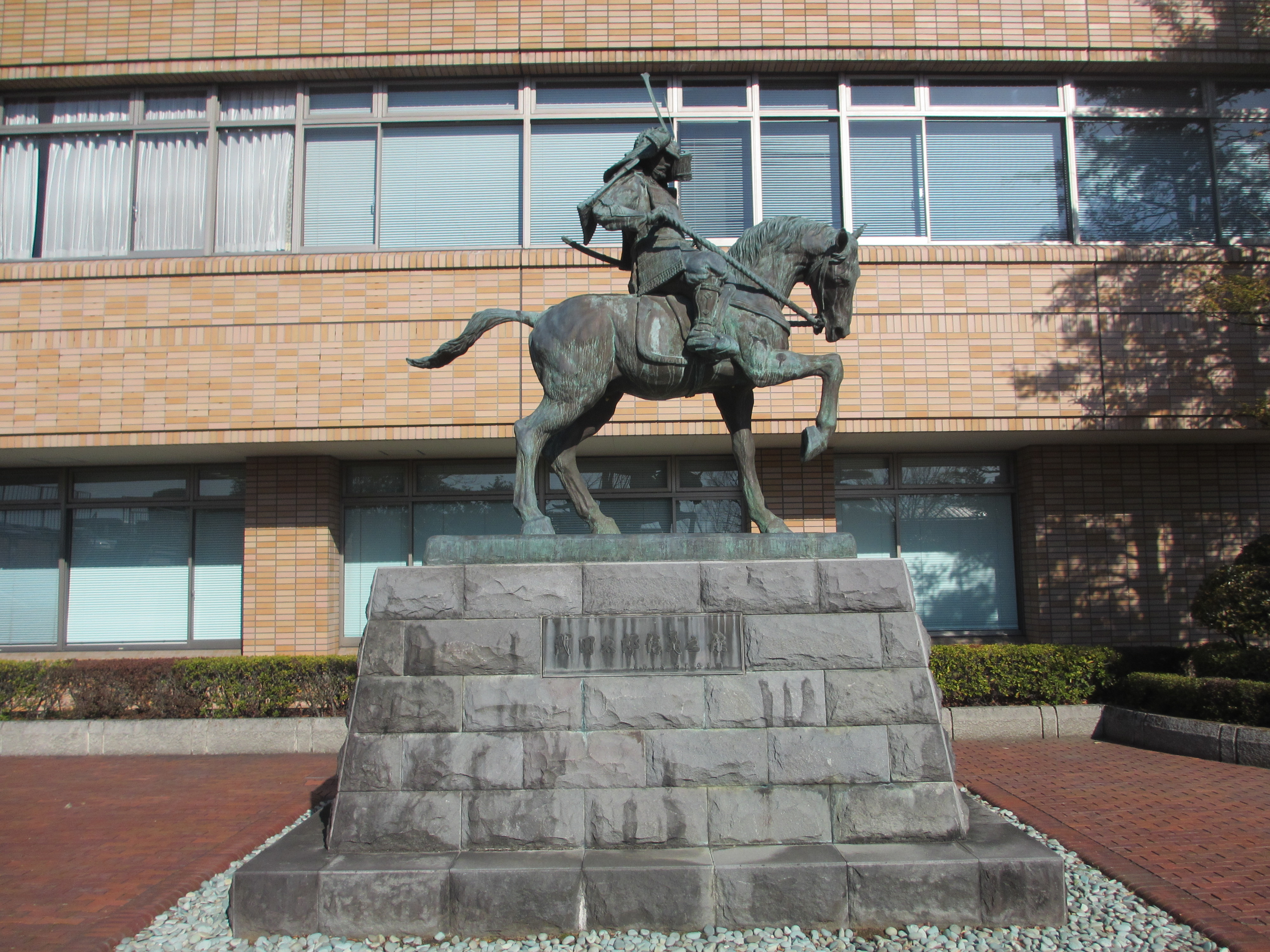
Statue of Takeda Nobuyoshi in front of Nirasaki City Hall in Nirasaki, Yamanashi

Takeda Nobuyoshi (武田 信義, September 11, 1128 - March 31, 1186, or later than 1194) was a Japanese samurai lord of the late Heian and early Kamakura period. He founded the Takeda clan and was the father of Ichijō Tadayori. He was also known as Takeda Tarō.

== Life ==
Takeda Hachimangū shrine in Kamiyama, Nirasaki, Yamanashi

Minamoto no Ryūkōmaru was born on September 11, 1128, the son of Minamoto no Kiyomitsu, the 3rd head of the Kai Minamoto clan. He was the great-grandson of Minamoto no Yoshimitsu. In 1140, at the age of 13, he held his coming of age ceremony (genpuku) at Takeda Hachimangū shrine, and changed his name to Takeda Tarō Nobuyoshi (Tarō being his azana and Nobuyoshi being his imina).

In 1180, he joined the Genpei War on the side of the Minamoto clan and participated in the Battle of Uji. After defeating the remaining forces of the Taira clan in Shinano Province, he progressed to Suruga Province with Minamoto no Yoritomo's forces. During the Battle of Fujikawa, Takeda carried out a surprise attack on Taira clan's forces at night, ultimately forcing them to flee. Yoritomo was pleased with Takeda's achievements in battle, and rewarded him with the position of Governor (shugo) of Suruga Province.

Although Takeda had fought on Yoritomo's side and contributed to his cause, Yoritomo felt threatened by his growing power. In addition, Yoritomo suspected Takeda of receiving an edict from Emperor Go-Shirakawa about a punitive expedition against Yoritomo in 1181. Yoritomo, suspicious of Takeda's intentions, had a talk with him, asking about any ideas of treason. This suspicion led to the decline of Takeda's political status in the Kamakura shogunate.

In 1184, Yoritomo ordered the assassination of Takeda's eldest son and heir, Ichijō Tadayori, who was the Governor of Musashi Province. At this point, Takeda had also been disfavored by Yoritomo.

== Death ==
One account of his death, is that the broken-hearted Takeda died on March 31, 1186, just two years after the murder of his son. He was 59 years old.

However, although the Azuma Kagami states that Takeda died on March 31, 1186, of an illness, there are records of him even after his supposed death in 1186. In 1190, he appears among the attendants to Yoritomo's invasion of Kyoto, and his name is also seen in 1194 during the construction of Tōdai-ji temple and as a kasagake archer. Based on these records, it has been pointed out that there is a strong possibility that Takeda was alive after 1186.

== In popular culture ==
=== TV series ===
- Taira no Kiyomori (2012) NHK Taiga drama, Toshiya Nagasawa as Takeda Nobuyoshi
- The 13 Lords of the Shogun (2022) NHK Taiga drama, Norito Yashima as Takeda Nobuyoshi

== Gallery ==
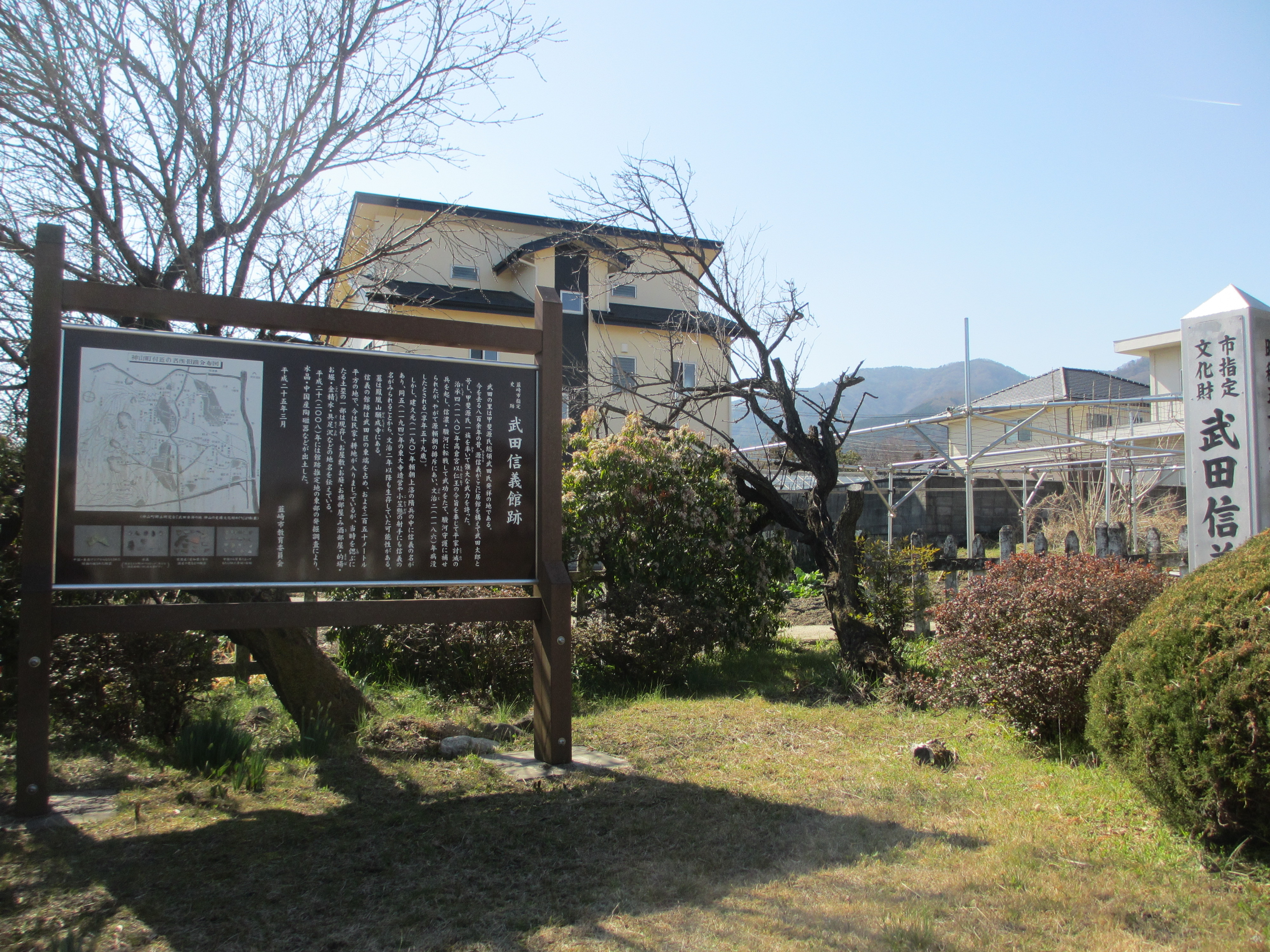
Ruins of Takeda Nobuyoshi's Mansion in Nirasaki

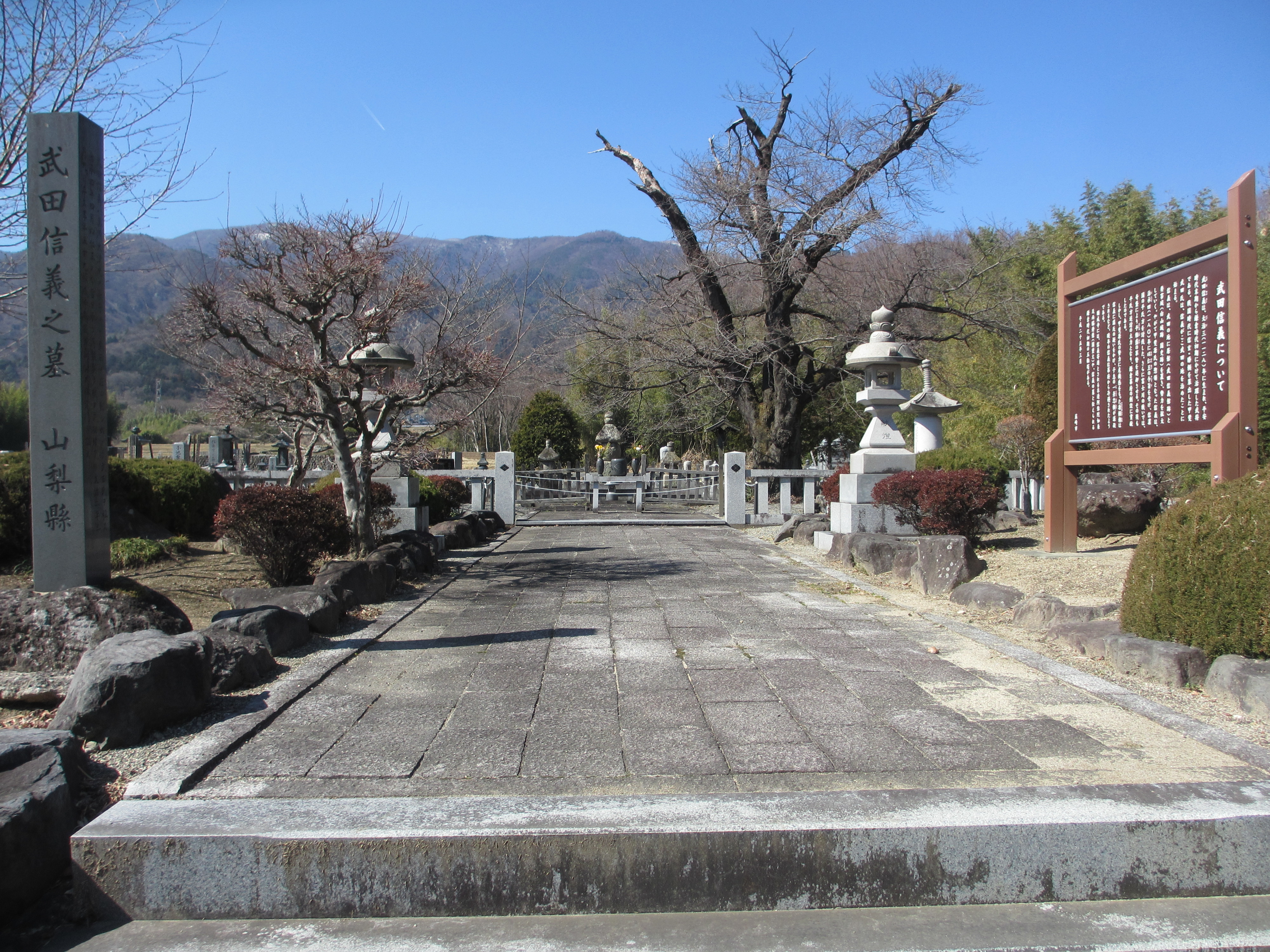
Takeda Nobuyoshi's grave in Nirasaki
