= Battle of Fujigawa =

Battle in 1180 in Japan

- Part of the Genpei War
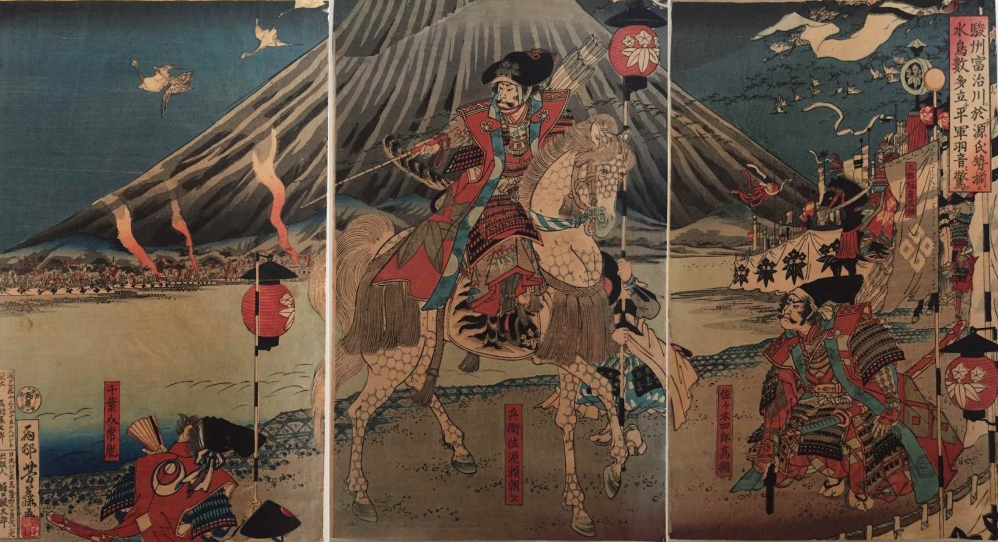
- Battle of Fujikawa by Utagawa Yoshitora.
Date	9 November 1180
Location	Fuji River, beneath Mount Fuji 35°09′31″N 138°41′47″E
Result	Minamoto victory

Belligerents
Minamoto clan Takeda clan of Kai	Taira clan

Commanders and leaders
Minamoto no Yoritomo; Takeda Nobuyoshi	Taira no Koremori; Itō Sukechika (POW)

Strength
30,000	
- Location within Japan

The Battle of Fujigawa (富士川の戦い, Fujigawa no tatakai) was a battle of the Genpei War of the Heian period of Japanese history. It took place in 1180, in what is now Shizuoka Prefecture.

== Background ==
Minamoto no Yoritomo, using Kamakura as his headquarters, sent his counselor Hōjō Tokimasa in August 1180 to convince the warlords Takeda of Kai and Nitta of Kotsuke to follow Yoritomo's command as he marched against the Taira.

As Yoritomo continued through the region below Mount Fuji and into Suruga Province, he planned a rendezvous with the Takeda clan and other families of the provinces of Kai and Kōzuke to the north. These allies arrived at the rear of the Taira army in time to ensure a Minamoto victory.

== Battle ==
During the night, Yoritomo launched an attack against the large Taira army camp. The Taira became alarmed when a flock of waterfowl flew over their camp, and the "small surprise became a rout".

== See also ==
- The Tale of the Heike
