= Sasaki Hideyoshi =

Sasaki Hideyoshi (佐々木 秀義; 1112–1184) was a samurai member of the Minamoto clan, who fought in the Hōgen and Heiji Rebellions and in the Genpei War. He was the adopted son of Minamoto no Tameyoshi since age thirteen.

== Life ==
Sasaki fought under Minamoto no Yoshitomo in the Hōgen Rebellion (1156), aiding in the siege of the Shirakawa palace. Three years later, he fought for the Minamoto again in the Heiji Rebellion, incurring the ire of the rival Taira clan.

By the time of the Genpei War, the all-out civil war between the Minamoto and the Taira, Hideyoshi had lost his hereditary estate in Ōmi Province as a result of the displeasure of the Taira. He set out to appeal to his uncle, Fujiwara no Hidehira, for aid, but stopped in Sagami province along his way. There, he attracted the interest of a daimyō named Shibuya Shigekuni; Hideyoshi married Shibuya's daughter, and became heir to that land. His sons would serve Minamoto no Yoritomo, the first Kamakura shōgun.

== Family ==
- grandfather:Sasaki Tsunekata
- father:Sasaki Tametoshi
- Wives:
  - Minamoto no Tameyoshi’s daughter
  - Shibuya Shigekuni's daughter
  - Utsunomiya-dono
- Children:
  - eldest son:Sasaki Sadatsuna (1142-1205) by Minamoto no Tameyoshi’s daughter
  - second son:Sasaki Tsunetaka (1142/1151-1221) by Utsunomiya-dono
  - third son:Sasaki Moritsuna (b.1151) by Minamoto no Tameyoshi’s daughter
  - fourth son:Sasaki Takatsuna by Minamoto no Tameyoshi’s daughter
  - fifth son:Sasaki Yoshikiyo by Shibuya Shigekuni's daughter
  - sixth son:Yoshida Gonsyu
  - 7th son:Nōkei

== See also ==
- Sasaki clan
- Rokkaku clan
- Kyogoku clan
