= The Tale of Heiji =

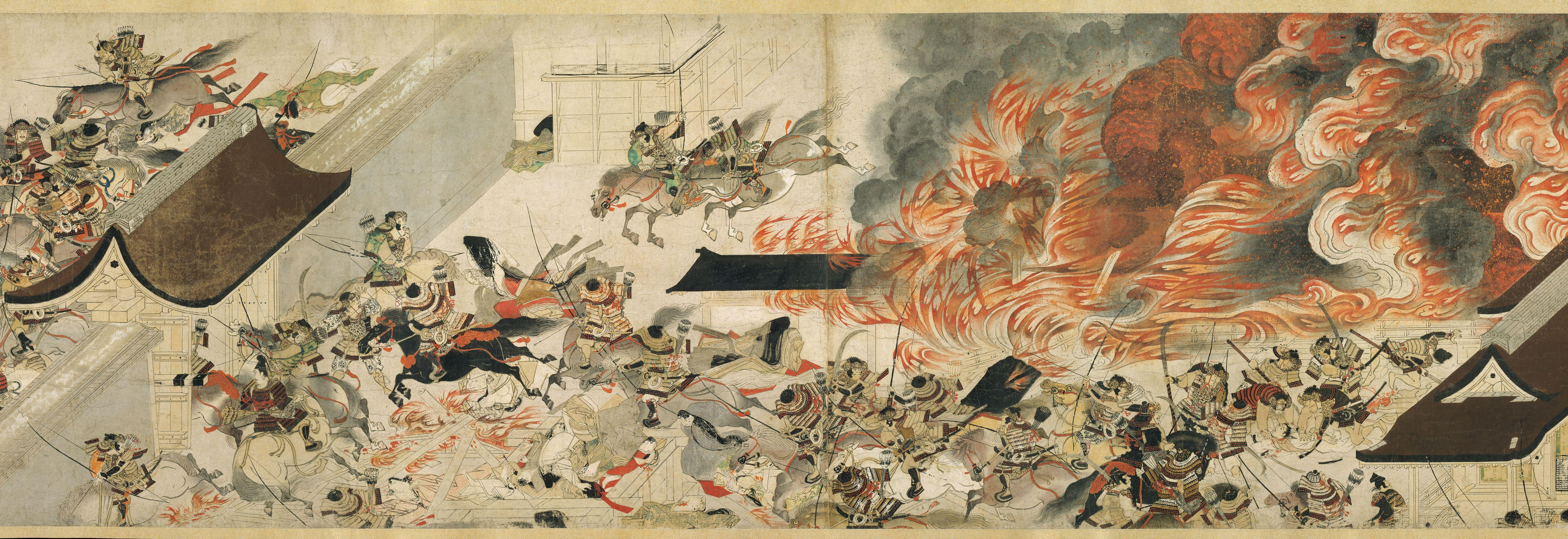
Night Attack on the Sanjo Palace (detail)

The Tale of Heiji (平治物語, Heiji monogatari) is a Japanese war epic (gunki monogatari) detailing the events of the Heiji Rebellion of 1159–1160, in which samurai clan head Minamoto no Yoshitomo attacked and besieged Kyoto, as part of a dispute over political power in which he was opposed by Taira no Kiyomori, head of the Taira clan.

== Text ==
The Tale, like most monogatari, exists in three main forms: written, oral, and painted. Around 33 variant texts exist. As is the case with most other monogatari, the text has been rewritten and revised many times over the years, and developed into an oral tradition as well. Most often, the Tale of Heiji would be chanted as a continuation of The Tale of Hōgen, which relates the events of the closely related Hōgen Rebellion, with some attributing the original text (which is now lost) to Hamuro Tokinaga. Thus it is claimed he wrote three important works (these two, plus the most famous Tale of Heike), though the works most likely have separate authorship due to differences in theme and style. From wording in the oldest versions of the work ("not long ago"), those variants likely date from the early Kamakura period, with some claiming that the original version may have been written prior to 1177.

The picture scroll version of the tale, called Heiji Monogatari Emaki or Heiji Monogatari Ekotoba, dates from the 13th century. It tells the tale in color on paper, on five scrolls. Each scroll begins and ends with a written portion of the tale, describing the events depicted in a single continuous painting across the length of the scroll. Perhaps the most famous scene of these five scrolls is the Night Attack on the Sanjō Palace. The emaki scrolls are now in the Museum of Fine Arts, Boston in Boston, Massachusetts. A digital reproduction of this scene is visible at http://digital.princeton.edu/heijiscroll/

Three English translations exist: a partial translation by Edwin O. Reischauer in 1951, a complete translation of an older version of the text by Marisa Chalitpatanangune in her dissertation in 1987, and a third, The Dawn of the Warrior Age: War Tales from Medieval Japan, was translated by Royall Tyler and published by Columbia University Press alongside The Tale of Hōgen in 2024.

== Themes ==
The Tale of Heiji describes the historical bridge between the aristocratic government of the Heian period and the military government of medieval Japan. The Heiji story moves beyond from the comparatively simple narration template of the Hōgen monogatari towards a more complicated focus which suggests a need for more nuanced principles and more flexible policies which become more appropriate to desperate times.

As in the Hōgen story, multi-level and inter-related rivalries lead to war. Brown identified the following:

- 1st level rivalry—a conflict amongst emperors:
  - Cloistered Emperor Go-Shirakawa (後白河天皇), 1127–1192
  - Emperor Nijo (二条天皇), 1143–1165
- 2nd level rivalry—a conflict amongst kuge aristocrats:
  - Fujiwara no Michinori (藤原通憲), also known by priestly name, Shinzei (信西), 11__-1160
  - Fujiwara no Nobuyori (藤原信頼), 1133–1159
- 3rd level rivalry—a conflict amongst (and within) warrior clans:
  - Taira no Kiyomori (平 清盛), 1118–1181
  - Minamoto no Yoshitomo (源 義朝, 1123–1160

However, Heiji is at its core a story about warriors and lower-ranking nobles. Go-Shirakawa is criticised for his failure to recognise and reward men of ability, both by promoting the incompetent Nobuyori and by not recognising the contribution of the valiant Yoshitomo. Meanwhile, the Minamoto fall, but would eventually rise, setting the story up as a counterpart of the Tale of Heike.

The narrative structure differs in versions, between a simple chronological narration to a thematic one. Kiyomori is also portrayed differently in different versions of the text, in earlier versions as wise and compassionate, in later ones as wicked, cowardly and lustful. Other themes found in some versions are the importance of filial piety and religious faith.

== Monogatari historiography ==
The Japanese have developed a number of complementary strategies for capturing, preserving and disseminating the essential elements of their commonly accepted national history--chronicles of sovereigns and events, biographies of eminent persons and personalities, and the military tale or gunki monogatari. This last form evolved from an interest in recording the activities of military conflicts in the late 12th century. The major battles, the small skirmishes and the individual contests—and the military figures who animate these accounts—have all been passed from generation to generation in the narrative formats of Hōgen monogatari (1156), Heiji monogatari (1159–1160), and Heike monogatari (1180–1185).

In each of these familiar monogatari, the central figures are popularly well known, the major events are generally understood, and the stakes as they were understood at the time are conventionally accepted as elements in the foundation of Japanese culture. The accuracy of each of these historical records has become a compelling subject for further study; and some accounts have been shown to withstand close scrutiny, while other presumed "facts" have turned out to be inaccurate.

== See also ==
- Hōgen Rebellion, 1156
  - Tale of Hōgen or Hōgen monogatari
- Heiji Rebellion, 1159–1160
- Genpei War, 1180–1185
  - Tale of Heike or Heike monogatari
