= The Tale of Hōgen =

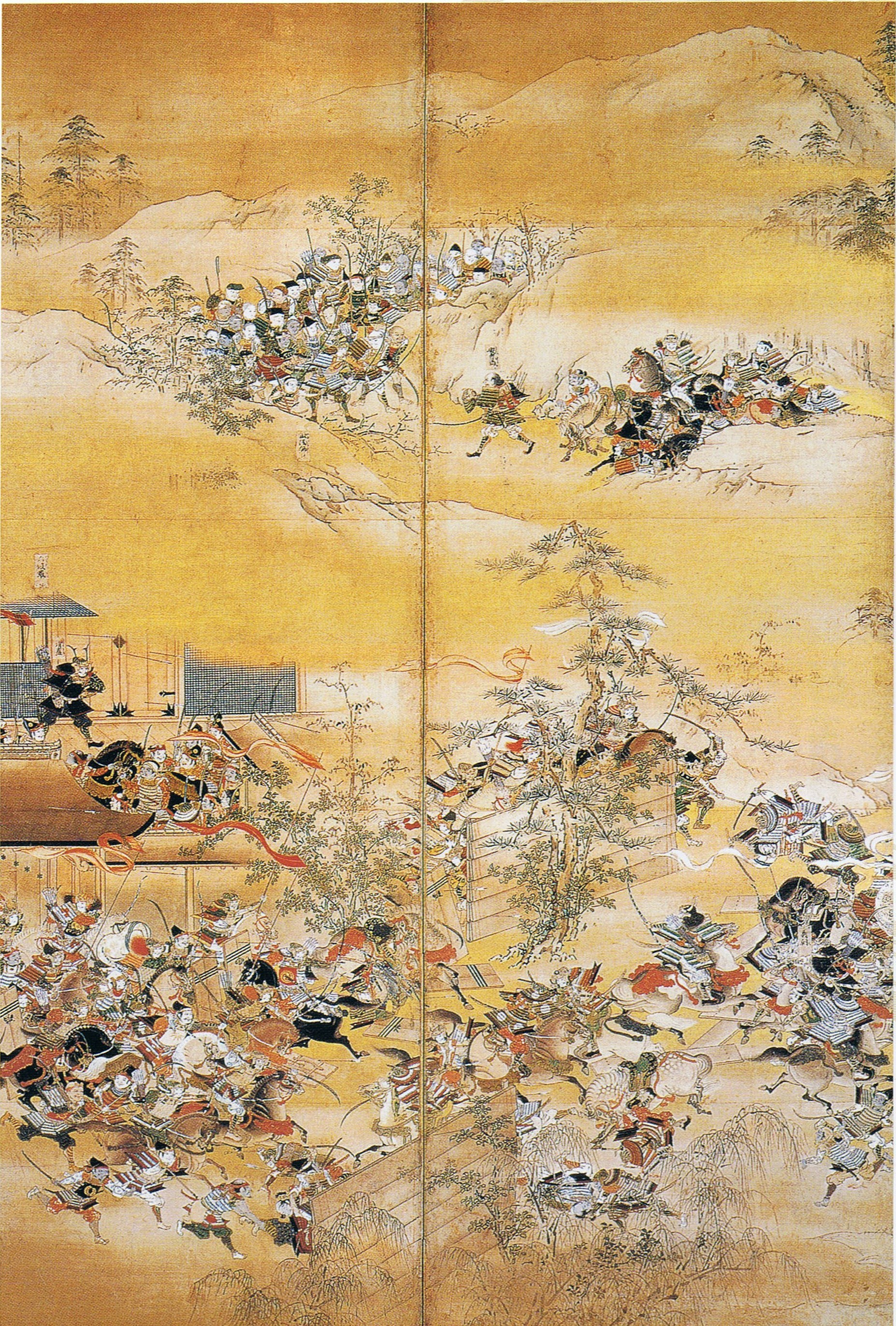
In this depiction of the Hogen Disturbance, the warrior in black armor is Taira no Kiyomori -- see mid-ground, left

The Tale of Hōgen (保元物語, Hōgen monogatari) is a Japanese war chronicle or military tale (gunki monogatari) which relates the events and prominent figures of the Hōgen Rebellion. This literary and historical classic is believed to have been completed in the Kamakura period ca. 1320. Its author or authors remain unknown. The events which are recounted in the Hōgen story become a prelude to the story which unfolds in Tale of Heiji.

== Rivalries ==
As in the Heiji story, multi-level and inter-related rivalries lead to war; and the main characters are presented in traditional status order: Emperors and former Emperors first, Fujiwara ministers second, and Minamoto clan warriors third.

- 1st level rivalry—a conflict amongst emperors:
  - Cloistered Emperor Emperor Toba (鳥羽天皇), 1103-1156
  - Cloistered Emperor Emperor Sutoku (崇徳天皇), 1119-1164
  - Reigning Emperor Go-Shirakawa (後白河天皇), 1127-1192
- 2nd level rivalry—a conflict amongst kuge aristocrats, between sons of Fujiwara no Tadazane (藤原 忠実), 1078-1162
  - Fujiwara no Tadamichi (藤原忠通), 1097-1164
  - Fujiwara no Yorinaga (藤原頼長), 1120-1156
- 3rd level rivalry—a conflict amongst (and within) warrior clans, amongst sons of Minamoto no Tameyoshi (源為義), 1096-1156
  - Tameyoshi's older sons support Go-Shirakawa
  - Tameyoshi and his younger sons support Sutoku.

As in the Heiji story, the narrative structure is divided in three segments:

- Part 1 introduces the characters and their rivalries.
- Part 2 relates course of the conflicts.
- Part 3 explains the tragic consequences.

== Monogatari historiography ==
The Japanese have developed a number of complementary strategies for capturing, preserving and disseminating the essential elements of their commonly accepted national history – chronicles of sovereigns and events, biographies of eminent persons and personalities, and the military tale or gunki monogatari. This last form evolved from an interest in recording the activities of military conflicts in the late 12th century. The major battles, the small skirmishes and the individual contests—and the military figures who animate these accounts—have all been passed from generation to generation in the narrative formats of the Hōgen monogatari (1156), the Heiji monagatari (1159–1160), and the Heike monogatari (1180–1185).

In each of these familiar monogatari, the central figures are popularly well known, the major events are generally understood, and the stakes as they were understood at the time are conventionally accepted as elements in the foundation of Japanese culture. The accuracy of each of these historical records has become a compelling subject for further study; and some accounts have been shown to withstand close scrutiny, while other presumed “facts” have turned out to be inaccurate.

== See also ==
- Hōgen Rebellion, 1156
- Heiji Rebellion, 1159-1160
- Tale of Heiji or Heiji monogatari
- Genpei War, 1180-1185
- Tale of Heike or Heike monogatari
