= Ōba Kagechika =

Japanese samurai

Ōba Kagechika (大庭 景親; died 1180) was a Japanese samurai in the Heian period.

== Life ==
The third son of Oba Kageyoshi, his azana was Saburō. He fought alongside his father against the Minamoto clan in the Hōgen Rebellion of 1156.

Facing off against Minamoto no Tametomo during the Hōgen Rebellion, Kagechika is credited with challenging Tametomo, crying

Lord Hachiman! During the Three Years War, in the attack upon the stockade at Kanazawa, Kamakura Gongorō Kagemasa, then only sixteen years of age, went to the front of the battle, and when his left eye was pierced by an arrow through his visor he loosed a shaft in return and took his assailant. I am the youngest descendant of that Gongorō, Oba Heita Kageyoshi's son, Oba Saburō Kagechika. Come on and fight!

Many years later, during the Genpei War, he led Taira clan forces to a victory against Minamoto no Yoritomo at Ishibashiyama in September 1180. However, two months later, Oba submitted to Yoritomo and was decapitated.

== See also ==
- The Tale of the Heike
- Sasaki Yoshikiyo
