= Heiji rebellion =

Brief Japanese clan conflict in 1160

- Part of Minamoto–Taira clan disputes of the Heian period
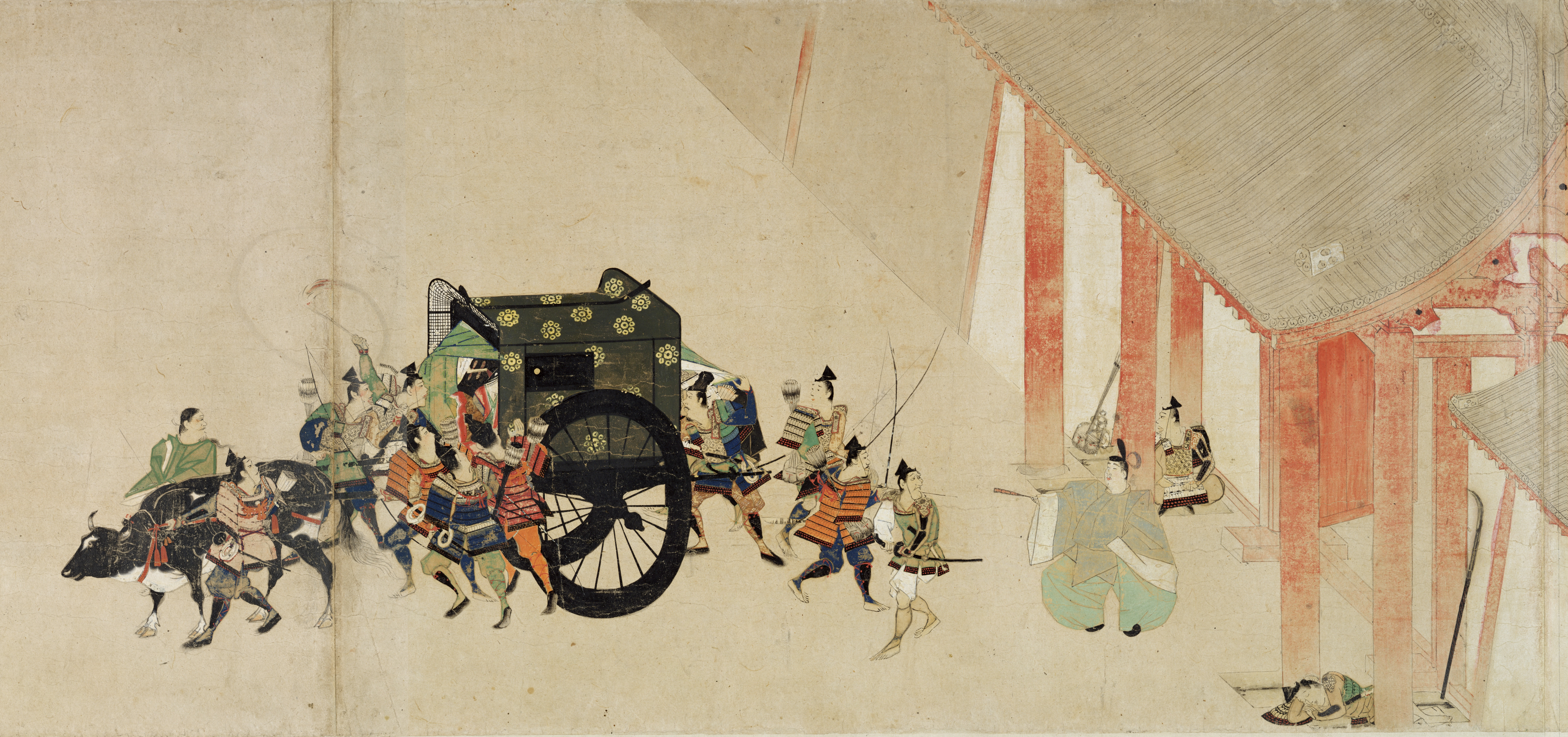
- Emperor Nijō escaping from the imperial palace
Date	January 19 – February 5, 1160
Location	Kyōto, Japan and surrounding areas
Result	Taira victory; Minamoto leaders banished

Belligerents
Taira clan, forces loyal to Emperor Nijō, forces loyal to Emperor Go-Shirakawa	Minamoto clan

Commanders and leaders
Taira no Kiyomori; Taira no Shigemori; Taira no Tsunemori; Fujiwara no Michinori †; Fujiwara no Tadamichi	Minamoto no Yoshitomo (executed); Minamoto no Yoshihira (executed); Minamoto no Yoritomo; Fujiwara no Nobuyori (executed)

Strength
Few thousand	Few thousand

Casualties and losses
Unknown	Unknown

The Heiji rebellion (平治の乱, Heiji no ran; January 19 – February 5, 1160) was a short civil war between rival subjects of the cloistered Emperor Go-Shirakawa of Japan in 1160 fought in order to resolve a dispute about political power. It was preceded by the Hōgen Rebellion in 1156. Heiji no ran is seen as a direct outcome of the earlier armed dispute; but unlike Hōgen no ran, which was a dispute between Emperors in which members of the same clan fought on different sides, this was rather a struggle for power between two rival samurai clans. It is also seen as a precursor of a broader civil war.

== Context ==
Following the Hōgen rebellion, in which retired Emperor Sutoku attempted to seize power and enthrone his son, Emperor Go-Shirakawa reigned for only three years before abdicating on September 5, 1158. (Hōgen 3, 11th day of the 8th month) Shortly thereafter, Emperor Nijō is said to have acceded to the throne (sokui).

After Nijō was formally enthroned, the management of all affairs continued to rest entirely in the hands of Go-Shirakawa, as per the system of Cloistered Emperor (insei). Fujiwara no Nobuyori and Fujiwara no Michinori (Shinzei) emerged as leading and rival advisors in this period, with Shinzei in a pre-eminent role. Further, while both the Taira and the surviving elements of Minamoto had helped Go-Shirakawa retain power, the Minamoto felt that the Taira were more greatly favoured by the court, under Shinzei's influence, and chafed at the ordered executions of those parts of the clan who were loyal to Sutoku (especially Minamoto no Tameyoshi).

In late 1159, Taira no Kiyomori, head of the Taira clan, left Kyōto with his family, on a personal pilgrimage. This left the ambitious Fujiwara no Nobuyori, with allies from the Minamoto clan, a perfect opportunity to effect an uprising.

- January 19 – February 5, 1160 (Heiji 1, 9th–26th day of the 12th month): The Heiji rebellion, also known as the Heiji disturbance or the Heiji insurrection or the Heiji war.

== Combat ==
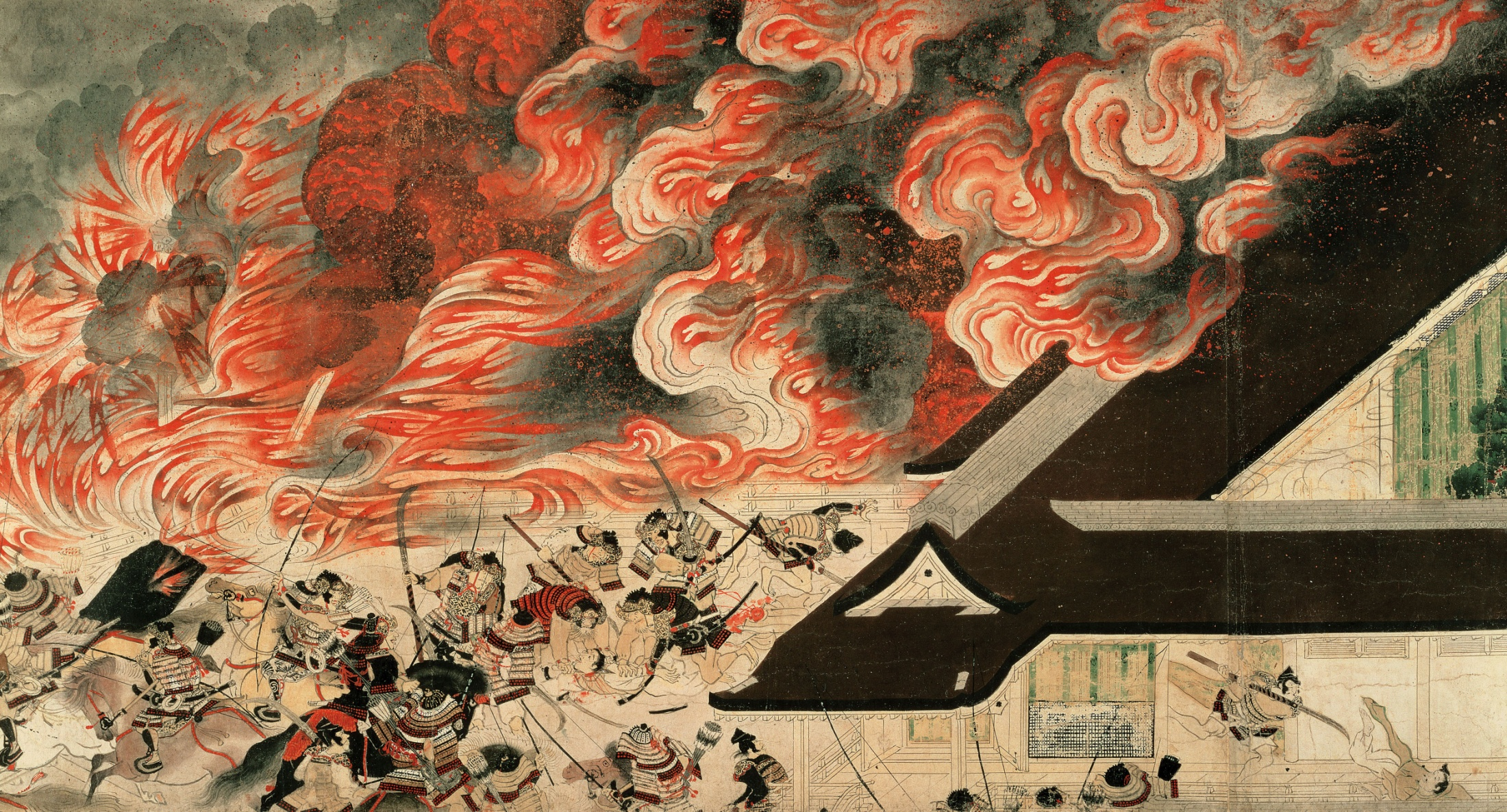
Night Attack on the Sanjō Palace (handscroll detail)

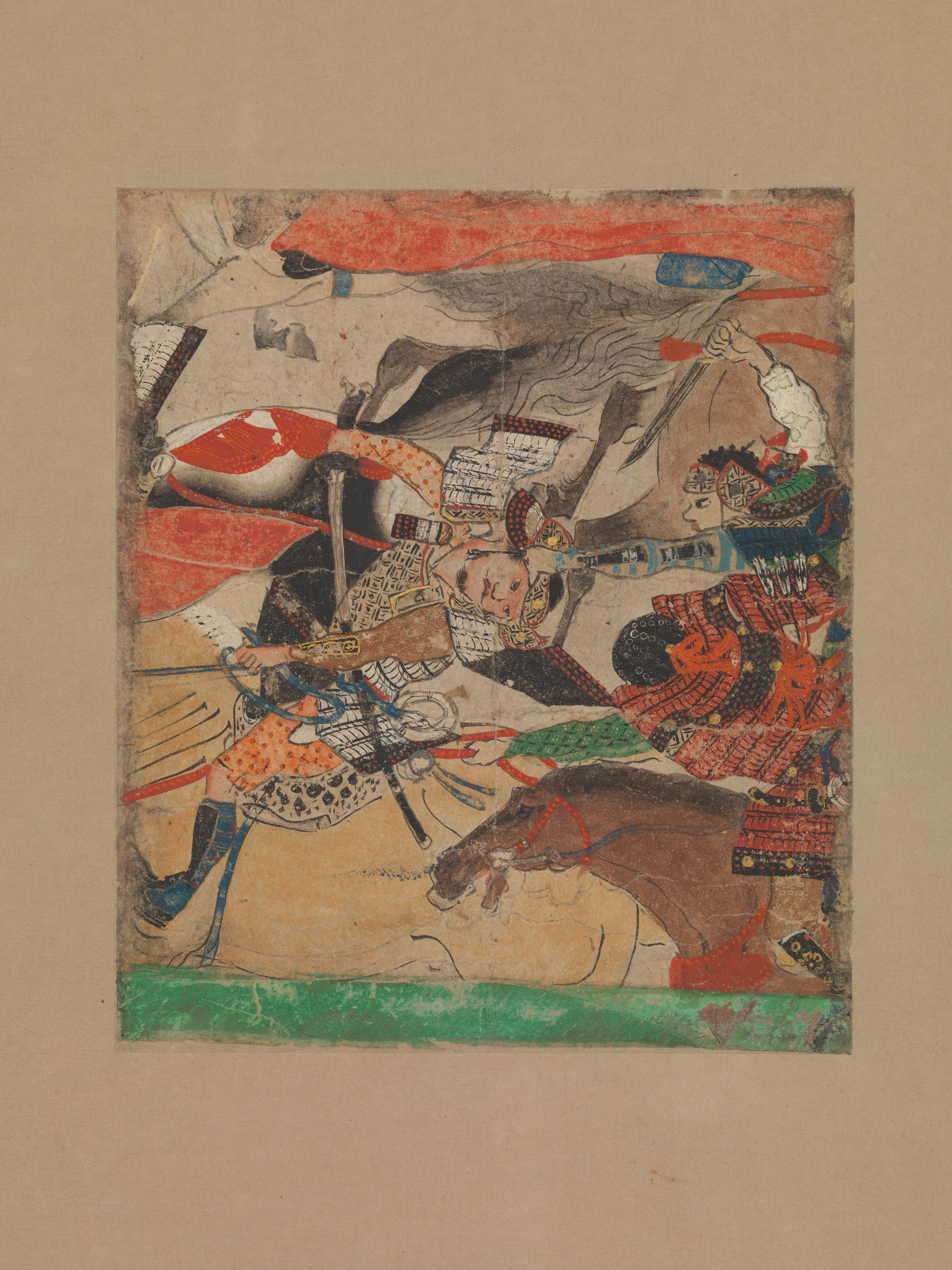
Battle at Rokuhara

In an attack on Sanjō Palace, the residence of the retired Emperor, Nobuyori and his Minamoto allies abducted the former emperor Go-Shirakawa and set fire to the Palace. After a pursuit, this also resulted in Shinzei's death.

Minamoto no Yoshitomo and Fujiwara no Nobuyori moved the abducted Go-Shirakawa to the Imperial palace with Emperor Nijo, placing both under house arrest. Nobuyori had himself declared imperial chancellor, and began to see his plans for political power fall into place.

However, Kiyomori was informed and made haste to return. The Minamoto did not plan well enough militarily, and were unprepared to defend the city against Kiyomori's return. Upon his return, the Minamoto made no decisive moves and hesitated.

Kiyomori made some peace proposals to Nobuyori. However, this was a plot. While Nobuyori was careless, the Emperor Nijō and the former emperor Go-Shirakawa escaped to Kiyomori's side.

Kiyomori received an imperial grant from the emperor for attacking Yoshitomo and Nobuyori. Taira no Shigemori (the eldest son of Kiyomori) led 3,000 cavalry and attacked the Imperial Palace where Yoshitomo and Nobuyori were staying. Nobuyori ran away immediately, but Minamoto no Yoshihira (the eldest son of Yoshitomo) fought back and a fierce battle ensued. Yoshihira fought hard and chased Shigemori within the Imperial Palace.

The Taira force retreated and the Minamoto force left the Imperial Palace in pursuit. This was a feint by Kiyomori. A detached Taira force occupied the Imperial Palace. The Minamoto force was cut off from any way of retreat. The Minamoto force charged at Rokuhara at a base of Kiyomori's. It became a fierce battle, but finally the Minamoto force fled in disorderly retreat.

== Outcome ==
Ultimately, Taira no Kiyomori defeated Yoshitomo. Yoshitomo was eventually betrayed and killed by a retainer while escaping from Kyōto in Owari. Yoshitomo's two sons, Minamoto no Tomonaga and Minamoto no Yoshihira were also casualties. However three of his other sons, Yoritomo (then only 13 years old, and future founding Shogun of the Kamakura Shogunate 25 years later), Noriyori and Yoshitsune were spared.

Afterwards, Taira no Kiyomori banished Yoshitomo's son Minamoto no Yoritomo, seized Minamoto wealth and land, and eventually formed the first of four samurai-dominated governments during the feudal history of Japan.

=== Legacy ===
The Heiji rebellion further weakened Imperial authority, placing power in the hands of the Taira samurai clan. It led to outright enmity between the Minamoto and Taira. The combination of this enmity and Go-Shirakawa's resentment of Taira power led to the Genpei War, ending with the decisive Taira defeat at the Battle of Dan-no-ura in 1185.

The Kamakura period epic Tale of Heiji describes the exploits of the samurai who participated in the Heiji Rebellion. Together with the Tale of Hōgen and the Tale of Heike, these war stories (gunki monogatari) describe the rise and fall of the Minamoto and Taira samurai clans.

== Illustrations ==
The scroll below, Illustrated Tale of the Heiji Civil War: Scroll of the Imperial Visit to Rokuhara, housed at the Tokyo National Museum, illustrates some events of the Heiji Rebellion.

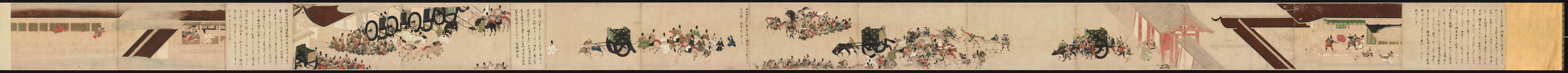
