= Siege of Shirakawa-den =

- Part of the Hōgen Rebellion
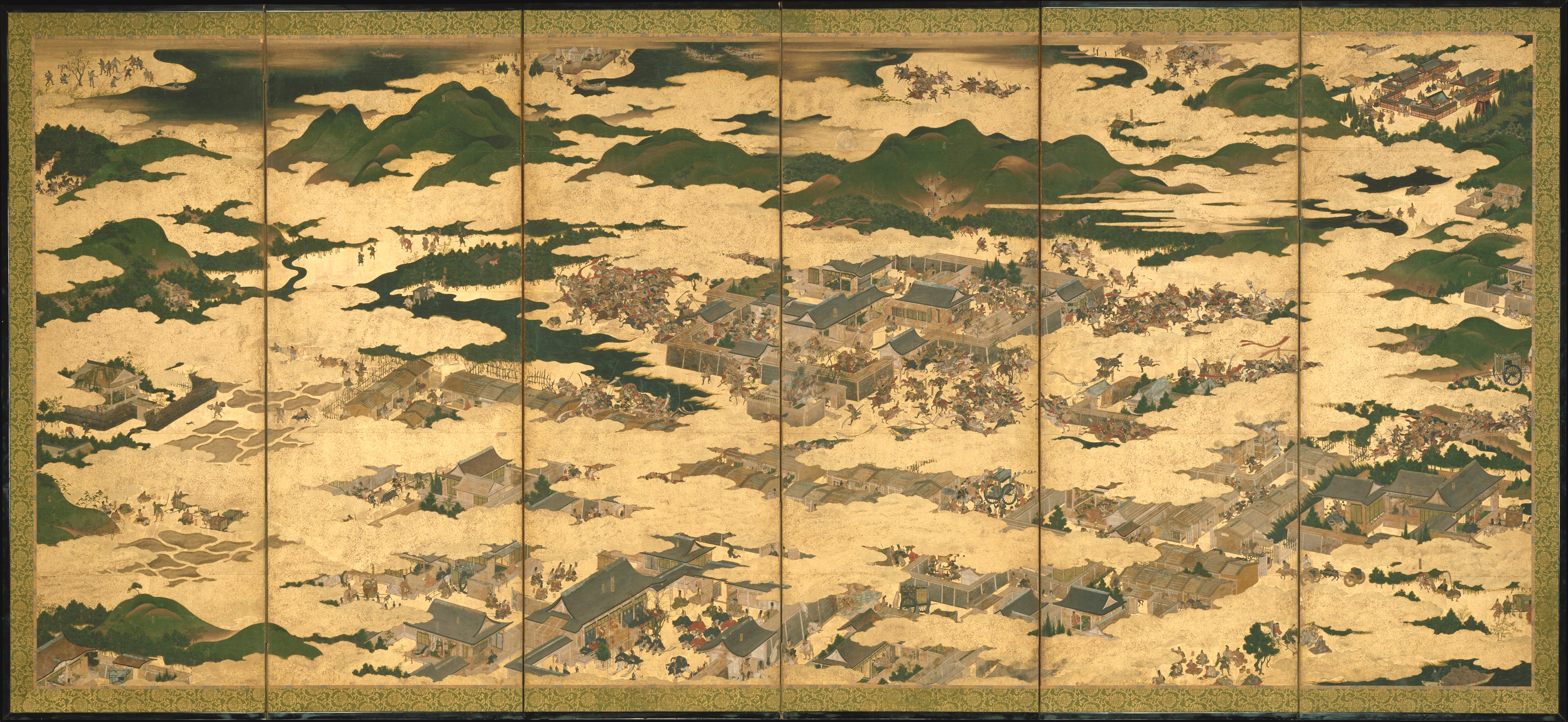
- "The Night Siege of Shirakawa-den", part of the Battles of Hogen and Heiji folding screen (17th century)
Date	July 1156
Location	Shirakawa Palace, Kyoto, Japan
Result	Palace burnt to ground

Belligerents
Minamoto clan in support of Emperor Sutoku	Taira clan in support of Emperor Go-Shirakawa

Commanders and leaders
Minamoto no Tameyoshi; Minamoto no Tametomo	Taira no Kiyomori; Minamoto no Yoshitomo

The siege of the Shirakawa-den (白河殿夜討) was the central event of the Hōgen Rebellion, a succession dispute which broke out after the death of the cloistered Emperor Toba. The conflict grew to involve the Fujiwara, Minamoto, and Taira clans, all major powers of the period.

The palace was attacked by Taira no Kiyomori and Minamoto no Yoshitomo and defended by Yoshitomo's father, Minamoto no Tameyoshi, along with Minamoto no Tametomo. Though a rivalry was beginning to grow between the Minamoto and Taira clans, loyalties were still far more mixed than they would be in the Genpei War of the 1180s, several decades later.

The samurai on both sides exchanged arrows in a number of archery duels before the palace was set aflame and the defenders were defeated.

== See also ==
- Ōba Kagechika
