= Hōgen rebellion =

Brief Japanese clan conflict in 1156

Coordinates: 35.0117°N 135.7680°E

- Part of clan disputes of the Heian period
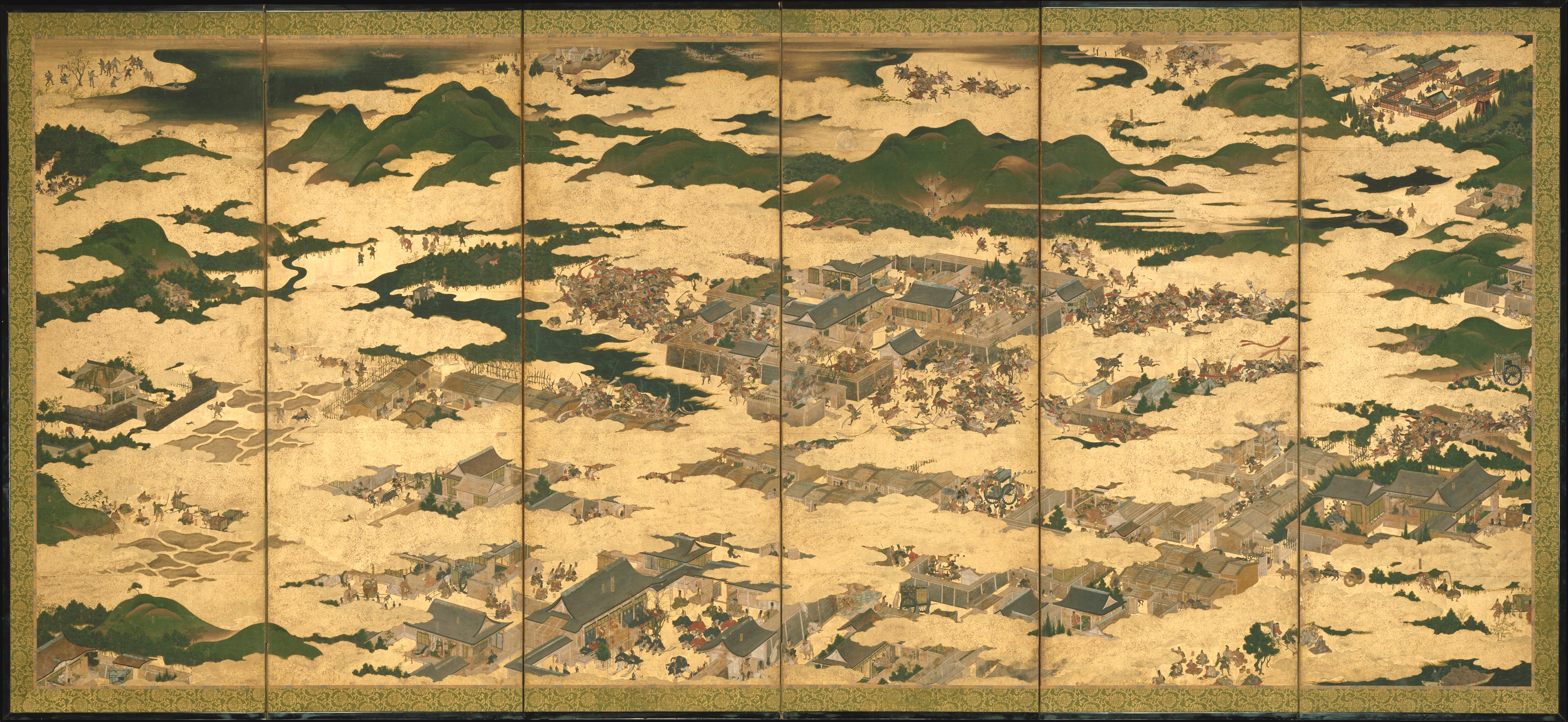
- Hōgen no ran battle screen
Date	July 28 – August 16, 1156
Location	Kyōto, Japan
Result	Victory for Emperor Go-Shirakawa; establishment of Minamoto-Taira rivalry

Belligerents
Forces loyal to Emperor Go-Shirakawa	Forces loyal to retired Emperor Sutoku

Commanders and leaders
Fujiwara no Tadamichi, Taira no Kiyomori, Minamoto no Yoshitomo	Fujiwara no Yorinaga, Minamoto no Tameyoshi, Taira no Tadamasa

Strength
Unknown	Unknown, incl. 600 cavalry

The Hōgen rebellion (保元の乱, Hōgen no ran; July 28 – August 16, 1156) was a short civil war fought in order to resolve a dispute about Japanese Imperial succession. The dispute was also about the degree of control exercised by the Fujiwara clan who had become hereditary Imperial regents during the Heian period.

Hōgen no ran produced a series of unanticipated consequences. It created a foundation from which the dominance of the samurai clans would come to be established. It is considered the beginning in a chain of events which would produce the first of three samurai-led governments in the history of Japan.

== Context ==
A simmering power struggle in the Imperial court was focused on three figures in 1155. After the former Emperor Toba and the former Emperor Sutoku abdicated, each intended to continue to wield various kinds of power behind the throne during the reign of Emperor Konoe in cloistered rule. However, when young Konoe died, the dynamics of the contending factions changed.

- August 23, 1155 (Kyūju 2, 24th day of the 7th month): In the 14th year of Konoe-tennō's reign (近衛天皇14年), the emperor died; and despite an ensuing dispute over who should follow him as sovereign, contemporary scholars then construed that the succession (senso) was received by a younger brother, the 4th son of former-Emperor Toba. Shortly after that, Emperor Go-Shirakawa is said to have acceded to the throne (sokui).

When Go-Shirakawa ascended the Chrysanthemum Throne, a new phase of this multi-faceted power struggle began to unfold. A bitter dispute between two of Toba's sons was paralleled by divisions within the several kuge families and others. Toba had forced one of his sons to abdicate in favor of the son of another consort; and after 1142, former Emperor Sutoku harbored the expectation that his son would follow Emperor Konoe on the throne. Sutoku's hopes were frustrated by the elevation of another brother who would become known as Go-Shirakawa.

- July 20, 1156 (Hōgen 1, 2nd day of the 7th month): The former-Emperor Toba died at the age of 54.

After the death of the Toba, forces loyal to reigning Emperor Go-Shirakawa and the forces supporting retired former Emperor Sutoku disputed the accession of Go-Shirakawa and his continued possession of the throne. The opposing groups were also contending over continuation of cloistered government.

== Battle ==
Go-Shirakawa and Sutoku were rival sons of Toba. Fujiwara no Tadamichi, first son of regent Fujiwara no Tadazane, sided with Go-Shirakawa while his younger brother Fujiwara no Yorinaga sided with Sutoku. Each rival side in turn beckoned the Minamoto and Taira clans of samurai. Minamoto no Tameyoshi, head of the Minamoto clan, and Taira no Tadamasa, head of the Taira contingent, sided with Sutoku and Yorinaga. Minamoto no Yoshitomo, first son of Minamoto no Tameyoshi, and Taira no Kiyomori, head of the Taira clan and nephew of Taira no Tadamasa, sided with Go-Shirakawa and Tadamichi.

- July 28, 1156 (Hōgen 1, 10th day of the 7th month): Both forces faced each other in Kyōto. On the Sutoku side, Minamoto no Tametomo (son of Minamoto no Tameyoshi and younger brother of Yoshitomo) suggested a night attack on an enemy palace, but Fujiwara no Yorinaga rejected this strategy. Meanwhile, their enemy Minamoto no Yoshitomo suggested the same, and followed through on it.
- July 29, 1156 (Hōgen 1, 11th day of the 7th month): At night, Kiyomori and Yoshitomo led 600 cavalry and attacked Sutoku in the Siege of Shirakawa-den. Kiyomori attacked the West gate where Tametomo defended it. Tametomo repulsed Kiyomori's force with his outstanding archery units.

Then Yoshitomo attacked Tametomo but he was also repulsed. Sutoku's samurai fought hard, and a fierce battle continued. Yoshitomo suggested that they set the enemy palace on fire. This was done and, fighting both the flames and Go-Shirakawa's forces, Sutoku's samurai fled, leaving Go-Shirakawa's allies victorious on the battlefield.

== Outcome ==
The forces of the reigning Emperor Go-Shirakawa went on to defeat the forces of the former Emperor Sutoku. This made way for Go-Shirakawa to abdicate while still continuing to exercise unfettered Imperial powers. Go-Shirakawa became the new cloistered emperor in 1158, and he would continue to exercise power throughout the reigns of five emperors: Emperor Nijō, Emperor Rokujō, Emperor Takakura, Emperor Antoku, and Emperor Go-Toba. His influence only ceased with his death in 1192. Sutoku was banished to Sanuki Province of Shikoku; Fujiwara no Yorinaga was killed in battle, and Minamoto no Tameyoshi and Taira no Tadamasa were executed. Tametomo survived the battle and was forced to flee.

Minamoto no Yoshitomo became head of his clan after the death of his father and together with Taira no Kiyomori, succeeded in establishing the two samurai clans as major new political powers in Kyoto.

=== Legacy ===
The outcome of the Hōgen Rebellion and the rivalry established between the Minamoto and Taira clans led to the Heiji Rebellion in 1159.

The Kamakura period epic Tale of the Disturbance in Hōgen is about the exploits of the samurai who participated in the Hōgen Rebellion. Together with the Tale of the Disturbance in Heiji and the Tale of Heike, these war stories (gunki monogatari) describe the rise and fall of the Minamoto and Taira samurai clans.

== See also ==
- Ōba Kagechika
- Matsuyama tengu
