= Sanemori =

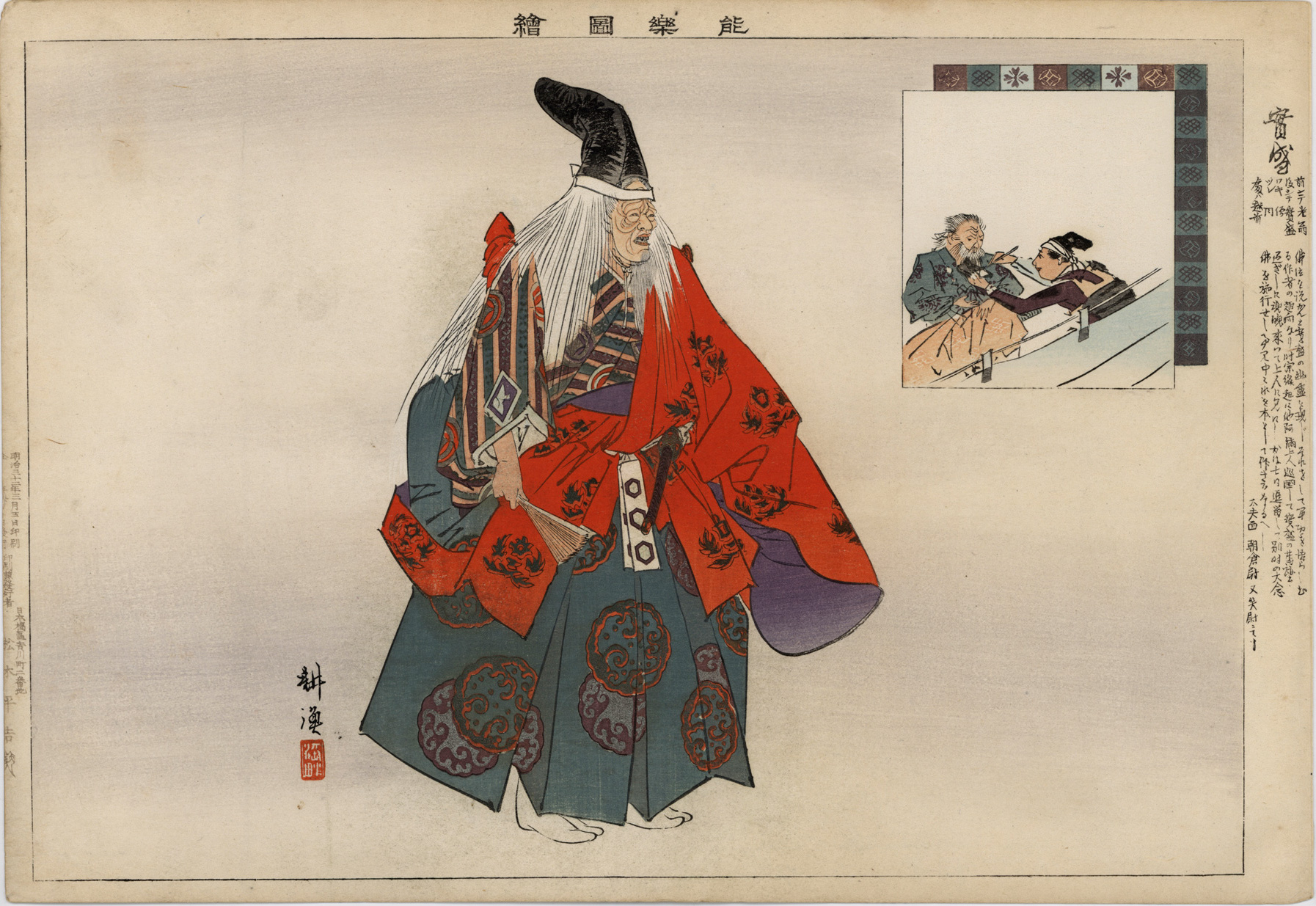
Scene from Sanemori; woodblock print by Kōgyo Tsukioka from the series Nōgaku zue or Pictures of Noh Plays

Sanemori (Kyūjitai: 實盛; Shinjitai: 実盛) is a Noh play by Zeami Motokiyo about a troubled warrior spirit, unusual because of the great age of the warrior in question.

== Theme ==
Saitō Sanemori was a samurai warrior who fought in the Genpei War, and died at the Battle of Shinohara when he was seventy-three years old. In Zeami's play, a travelling monk encounters a ghost who reveals himself to be Sanemori, having spent the two centuries since his death dwelling “among the Asuras/ Enduring pains too horrible to tell”. Redeemed by prayers to Amida Buddha, the ghost then tells the story of his last fight, and how the dyed locks on his severed head moved his adversaries to respect and awe at his courage in fighting despite his advanced age: “Alas for the old warrior! Utterly spent with fighting, Like a dying tree storm-smitten...”

== Later echoes ==
Bashō wittily quoted from the Noh play in an early haiku – “The old-lady cherry / Is blossoming, a remembrance / Of years ago – where the closing phrase is taken directly from the drama.

Later, at the very site where Sanemori’s helmet was kept, he wrote a more deeply felt haiku – “How pitiful! / Underneath the helmet / A cricket chirping” – taking his first line directly from the play.

== See also ==
- Heike Monogatari
