= Minamoto no Tametomo =

Samurai who fought in the Hōgen Rebellion of 1156 (1139–1170)

- 源 為朝
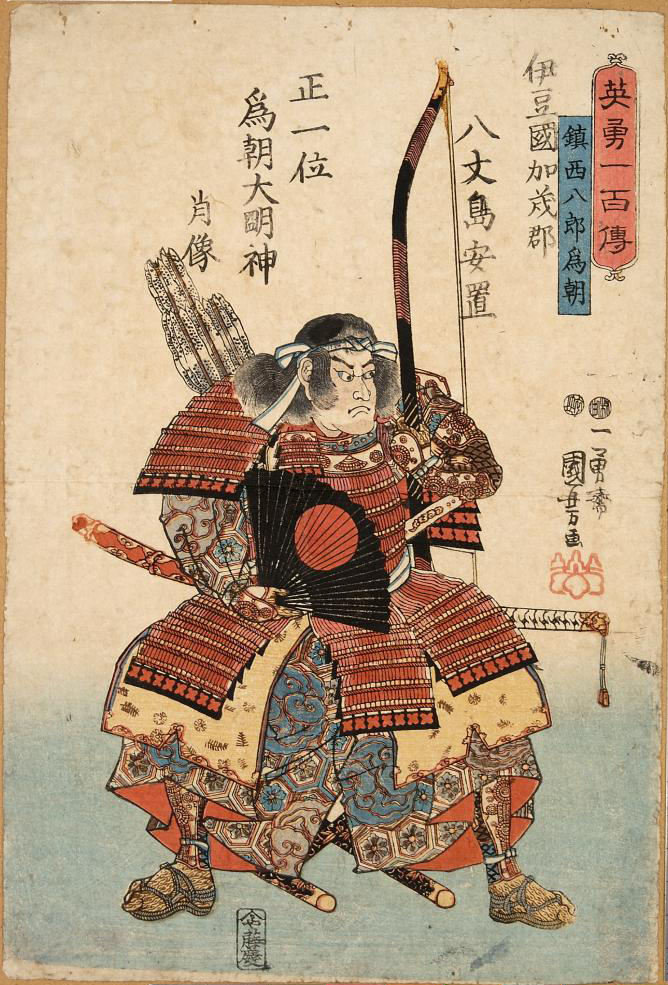

Personal details
- Born: 1139 A.D.
- Died: 23 April 1170 (aged 30–31) Higo Province, Japan
- Parent: Minamoto no Tameyoshi (father) Unknown (mother)

Military service
- Allegiance: Minamoto clan
- Battles/wars: Hōgen Rebellion, Siege of Shirakawa-den

Minamoto no Tametomo (源 為朝; Japanese pronunciation: [mʲì.nä́.mó̞.tó̞ nó̞ | tä̀.mé̞.tó̞.mó̞, -nó̞ tä́-]; 1139 – April 23, 1170), also known as Chinzei Hachirō Tametomo (鎮西 八郎 為朝), was a Japanese samurai who fought in the Hōgen Rebellion of 1156.

== Life ==
Tametomo was the son of Minamoto no Tameyoshi, and brother to Yukiie and Yoshitomo.

According to the Baishōron, a 14th-century military chronicle, records at Hakozaki Shrine included a letter of endowment from Tametomo (referred to as Chinzei Hachirō Tametomo) granting an endowment to the shrine. This document was discovered by Ashikaga Takauji when he sought a model for the letter of endowment for his own land donation to the shrine.

He is known in the epic chronicles as a powerful archer and it is said that he once sunk an entire Taira ship with a single arrow by puncturing its hull below the waterline. It is also added in many legends that his left arm was about 4 inches longer than his right, enabling a longer draw of the arrow, and more powerful shots. He fought in the Siege of Shirakawa-den, along with his father, against the forces of Taira no Kiyomori and Minamoto no Yoshitomo, his brother. The palace was set aflame, and Tametomo was forced to flee.

After the Hōgen Rebellion, the Taira cut the sinews of Tametomo's left arm, limiting the use of his bow, and then he was banished to the island of Ōshima in the Izu Islands. Tametomo eventually killed himself by slicing his abdomen, in an act known as seppuku. He is quite possibly the first warrior to commit seppuku in the chronicles.

During the Edo period, a descendant of Tametomo named Kitō Heinai (鬼頭 兵内) was involved in the 1754 Hōreki River incident.

== In art ==
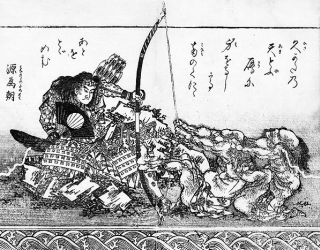
Chinsetsu yumihari-zuki, illustrated by Katsushika Hokusai

Tametomo is the focus of Takizawa Bakin's novel Chinsetsu yumihari-zuki (Strange Tales of the Crescent Moon), which was illustrated by the famous artist Hokusai.

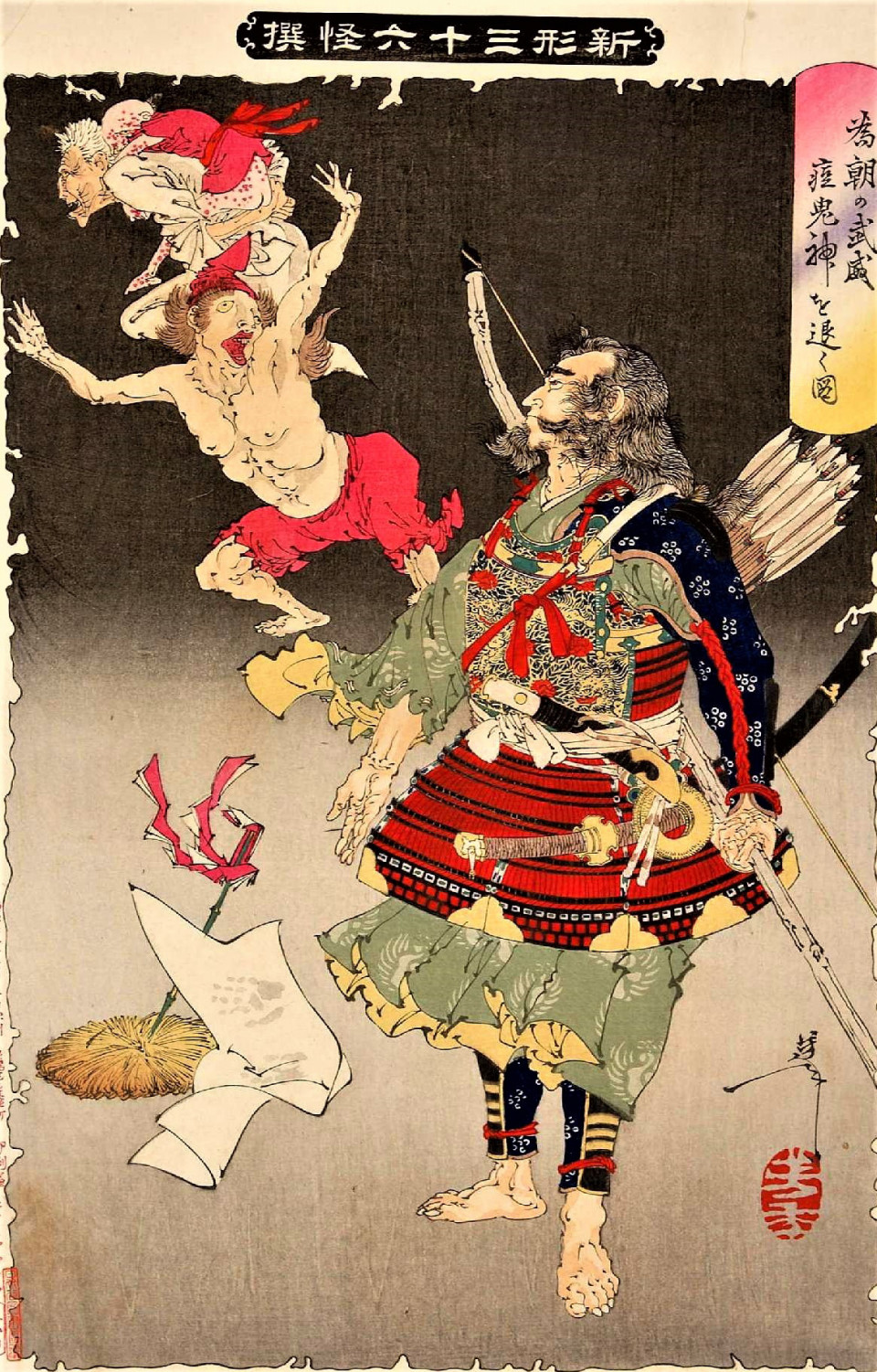
Minamoto no Tametomo chasing away smallpox demons, in a print by Yoshitoshi, 1890

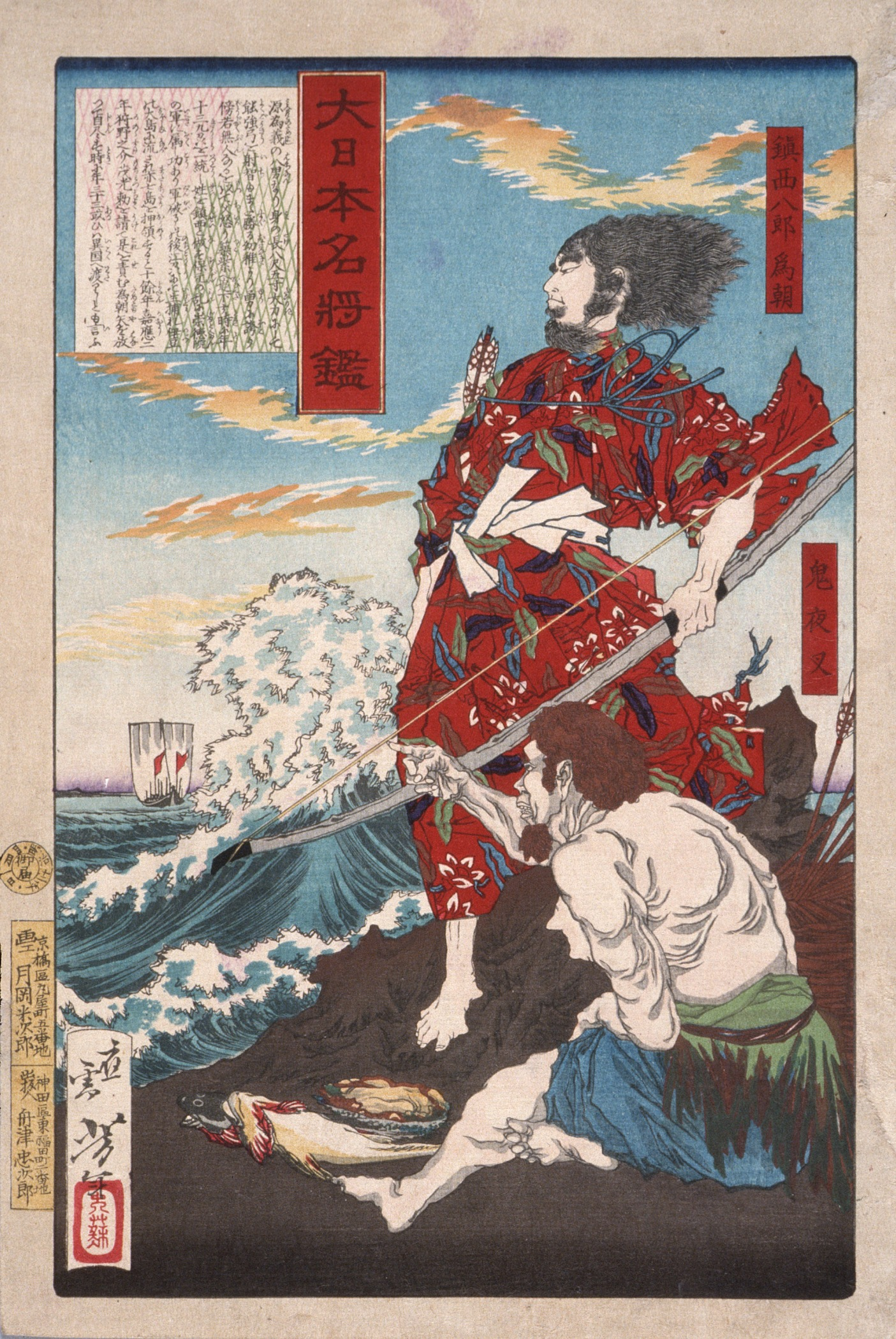
Tametomo and Oniyashi on a beach

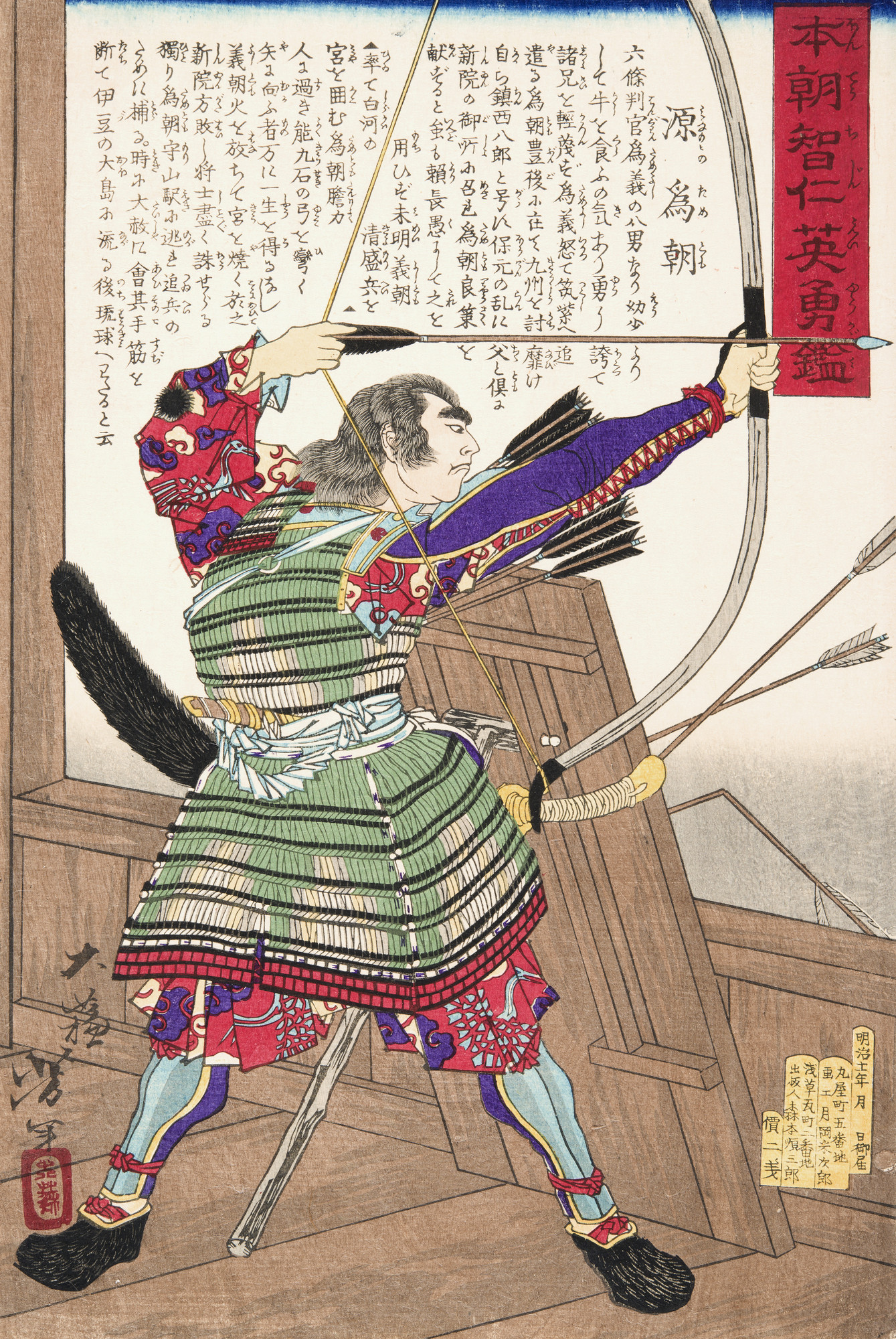
Minamoto no Tametomo drawing his bow

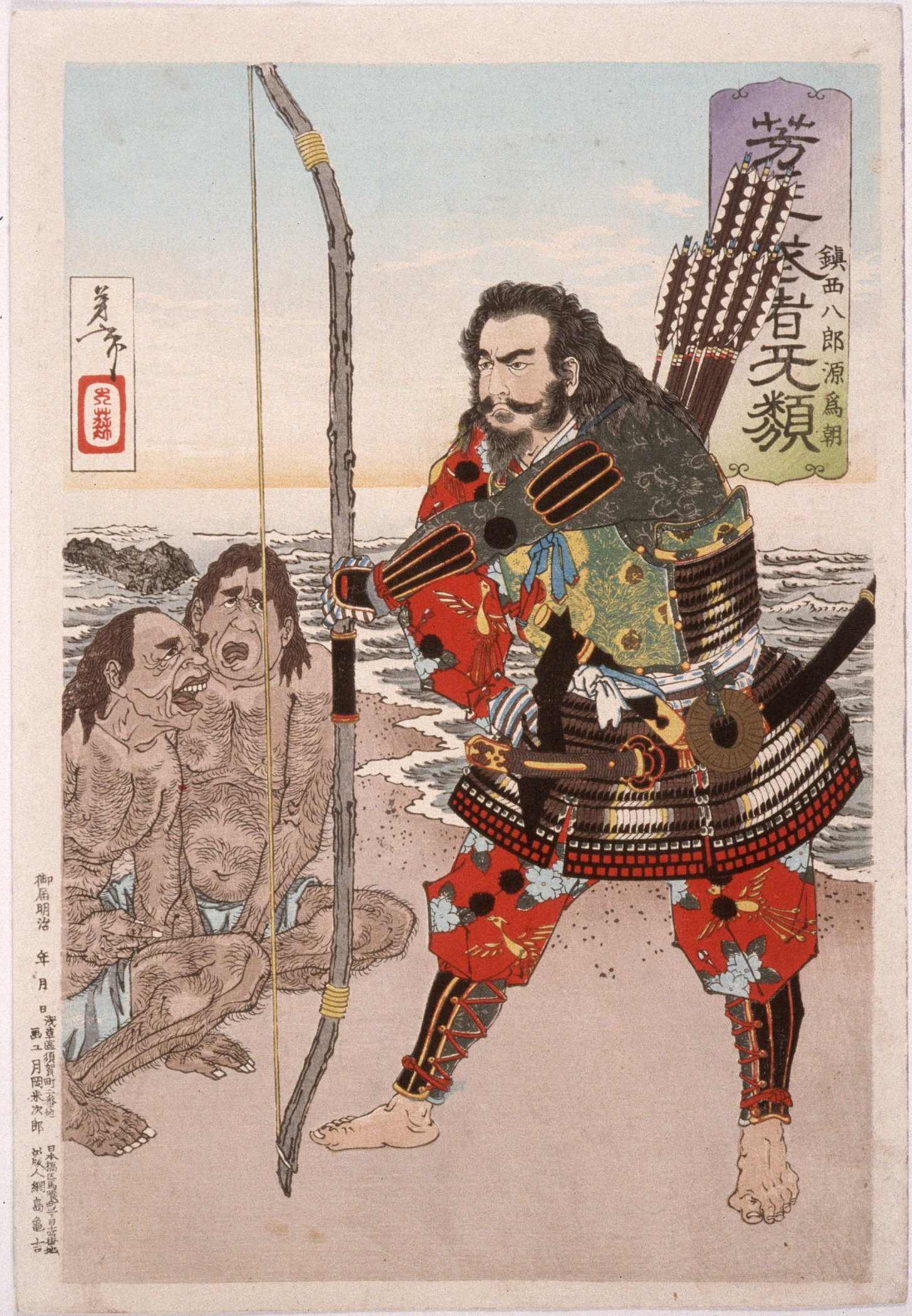
Minamoto no Tametomo with two islanders on a beach at Ashijima

== Legacy ==
Tametomo's story as a powerful exiled warrior has persisted in local traditions of the Izu Islands. Politician Inejirō Asanuma, who was born on Miyake-jima, recounted in his memoirs that a local historian and friend, Etsutarō Asanuma, once told him that his combative spirit in the National Diet must come from carrying Tametomo's blood. Asanuma himself noted the comment made him feel "a bit ticklish" when called a "modern-day Tametomo."

== See also ==
- Hokusai
- Takizawa Bakin
- Shunten
- King of Ryukyu
