= Gunki monogatari =

Genre of Japanese literature

Gunki monogatari (軍記物語, Military chronicle-tale), or "war tales", is a category of Japanese literature written primarily in the Kamakura and Muromachi periods that focus on wars and conflicts, especially the civil wars that took place between 1156 and 1568. Examples of this genre include the Hōgen Monogatari and the Heiji Monogatari. The most well known gunki monogatari is Heike Monogatari.

== Authorship ==
Unlike their Heian counterparts such as Genji Monogatari, many of the medieval warrior tales have no identifiable authors and are generally composed by multiple people. The authors did not write the stories entirely from start to end but instead edited and re-wrote them multiple times.

== Distribution ==
There were two forms in which gunki monogatari were transmitted: through yomimono (written texts) and through recitation by blind priests known as biwa hōshi. The oral practices had a ritual component, as they were thought to restore order to society and pacify the angry souls of warriors killed in battle, but they also functioned as wayside entertainment.

Historically, warrior tales have achieved much acclaim through their recitations accompanied by the lute, hence leading to the widespread misconception that gunki Monogatari were originally written for the exclusive purpose of memorization and recitation.

However, comparisons of carefully preserved original manuscripts reveal that the Heike Monogatari, the most famous war tale, was originally written pseudo-historically to chronicle the battle between the Minamoto and Taira families. In formulating this tale, the author borrowed heavily from existing oral narratives as well as diaries and other historical records. Since the original record was written to be read, not recited, it had to be revised for recitation. The current authoritative copy of the Heike is a result of transcriptions of these oral recitations.

== Style and form ==
The medieval war tales are written in a mix of Japanese and Chinese; the prose was Japanese but included numerous Chinese phrases, as opposed to mid-Heian warrior tales, which were composed in kanbun (Chinese prose). Although the texts are primarily written in prose, they also include occasional poems, usually waka.

Another key difference between medieval war tales and their predecessors is that Heian literature takes the form of historical records while medieval tales truly fall under the category of monogatari. While both often focus around a sole warrior who caused a major societal disturbance, the medieval war tales have a unique focus on the personal thoughts and experiences of individual warriors. Heian literature focuses on the capital's view of provincial disturbances, but medieval war tales shift their perspective to focus on those actually involved with the war, often sympathizing with the defeated warriors. The authors of gunki monogatari do not hesitate to sympathize with the warriors or moralize about their actions.

The general form of the warrior narrative usually consists of three parts, describing respectively the causes of the war, the battles themselves, and the war's aftermath. The texts are generally episodic, broken up into numerous small tales often focusing on select incidents or warriors. This is a result of the text's oral transmission. The battle scenes themselves also reflect a connection with oral practices. For example, if we examine different versions of the Heike monogatari, we can see that earlier versions, such as the Shibu kassenjō, included only a general description of the battle itself, while later versions include individual warrior's actions. Furthermore, the later tales transform the warriors from human figures into idealized heroes who embody the warrior ethic. These later accounts are probably fictional, a result of the tendency of oral tales to use real people and events and integrate them with prescribed themes to create effective performances. Thus the warrior tales are a mixture of historical fact and dramatic fiction.

We can also draw links between the oral traditions and the manner in which these battle scenes are conducted. Battle scenes commonly include descriptions of the warrior's clothing and armor, which is used both as a means of identifying the warrior and as a means of describing the warrior's personality. These descriptions were formulaic, but still effectively described the individual warrior's attributes. Another part of the warrior scenes was the hero announcing his name, a speech which included not merely his personal name and title, but also his familial connections and accomplishments.

=== Warrior ethics ===
The gunki monogatari puts a great deal of emphasis on the warrior ethic. This moral system includes, first of all, loyalty to one's lord and being valiant in the face of certain death. This is manifest in the self-sacrificial spirit of Heike Monogatari's Sanemori, who despite his age, repeatedly turns back to engage the enemy so as to protect the retreating Heike forces. This loyalty is firmly tied to the concept of personal honor; warriors would rather die and be praised posthumously than live on with a tainted name.

The code of honor also rejects compassion when it conflicts with duty. This is illustrated in Heike monogatari when a young Genji warrior Yukishige turns on Takahashi and kills him despite the fact that the latter had just spared his life on account of Yushikige's youthful resemblance to his own son. While pity for a youthful enemy on account of fatherly affection is a common refrain in the plot of gunki monogatari, Yushikige's single-minded loyalty to his camp at the expense of compassion is arguably closer to the rigid concept of honor espoused by the warrior class. This rigid adherence to the code of loyalty is echoed in the famous Atsumori-Naozane episode, where the exhortations of the warrior ethic outweigh Naozane's regret and forces his hand to kill.

Besides prescribing the "right" moral code to pursue, warrior ethics also restrict and dictate warriors' actions on more superficial levels. For example, cutting off the heads of enemies as war trophies was considered the norm in the battlefield but condemned as unchivalrous if the enemy had already surrendered.

The warrior ethic dictates a set course of action that warriors ought to pursue regardless of their personal sentiments or inclinations. An example of this is the classic battle between 'duty' and 'desire' which plays out in Atsumori's story in Heike Monogatari. Nevertheless, the aberrations between the actions of different characters in various versions of the war tales betray differences in the way various editors and authors perceived the ideal warrior ethic; hence we must refrain from drawing definite conclusions about the fixed nature of the warrior ethic.

=== Buddhism ===
The other chief value system that governs the ethic of gunki monogatari is Buddhism. First, Buddhism and the warrior ethic are not seen as opposed to each other. Despite their inherent differences, the gunki monogatari ethic represents a sort of combination of the two. This is possible primarily because the form of Buddhism espoused by gunki monogatari is Amida Buddhism, which teaches that anyone who repents for their sins and calls on Amida Buddha can be reborn in his Western Paradise and achieve enlightenment from there. This belief allows warriors, even as they commit acts of violence, to call on Amida's name. Furthermore, pursuing enlightenment in this life, according to Amida Buddhism, is impossible because of the deterioration of Buddhist law on earth (mappō).

Key Buddhist ideas in the gunki monogatari include karma, the idea that current circumstances are punishments or rewards for past actions, and impermanence, the idea that all things on this earth cannot last long. These themes appear overtly in short sermon-like interjections in the text. Heike monogatari, in particular, can be conceived of as one long sermon on Buddhism.

== Resources ==
- Butler, Kenneth Dean. "The Heike monogatari and The Japanese Warrior Ethic". Harvard Journal of Asiatic Studies, Vol, 29 1969: 93-108.
- Joseph, Herbert S.. "The Heike Monogatari": Buddhist Ethics and the Code of the Samurai". Folklore, Vol. 87, No. 1. 1976: 96-104.
- McCullough, Helen Craig. "Introduction". Heike Monogatari. Stanford University Press, 1988.
- "Gunki Monogatari." Traditional Japanese Literature. Ed. Haruo Shirane. Columbia University Press, 2006.
