= Fujiwara no Michinori =

Fujiwara no Michinori (藤原 通憲; 1106 – January 23, 1160), also known as Shinzei (信西), was a Buddhist monk in late Heian period Japan. He was one of the chief advisors to Emperor Nijō, and one of the chief allies of Taira no Kiyomori. Enmity towards him led to the Heiji Rebellion of 1159, in which he died early in the conflict.

As the head of the leading faction at Court, Shinzei enjoyed access to the emperor and other privileges which his rival Fujiwara no Nobuyori envied. In early 1160, Shinzei's ally Taira no Kiyomori left the capital with much of his family, thus providing Nobuyori's faction (and his allies, the Minamoto clan) the opportunity to make a move for power. Some believe this may have been intentional on Kiyomori's part, laying a trap for the Minamoto.

Shinzei being beheaded (Illustrated Scroll of the Heiji Rebellion – Shinzei Scroll)

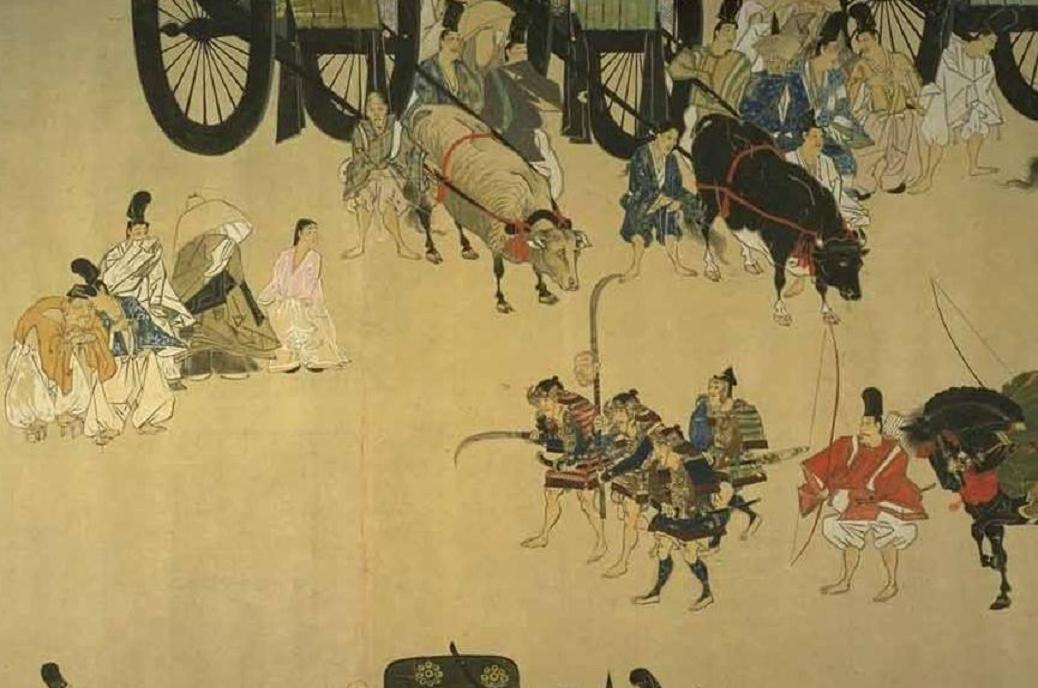
Matsuyama's men, allies of the Minamoto clan, bring back Shinzei's head as a trophy

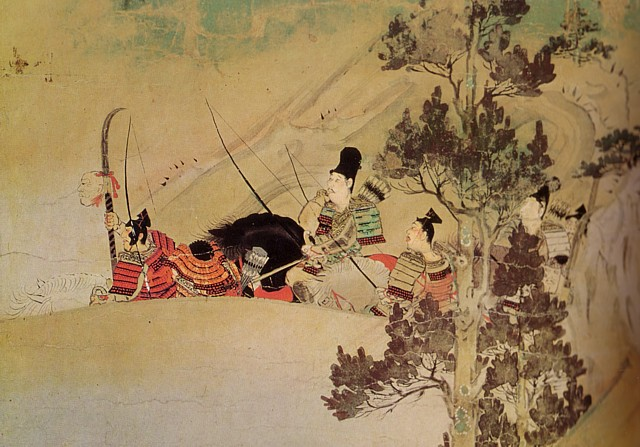
Matsuyama's men, allies of the Minamoto clan, bring back Shinzei's head as a trophy

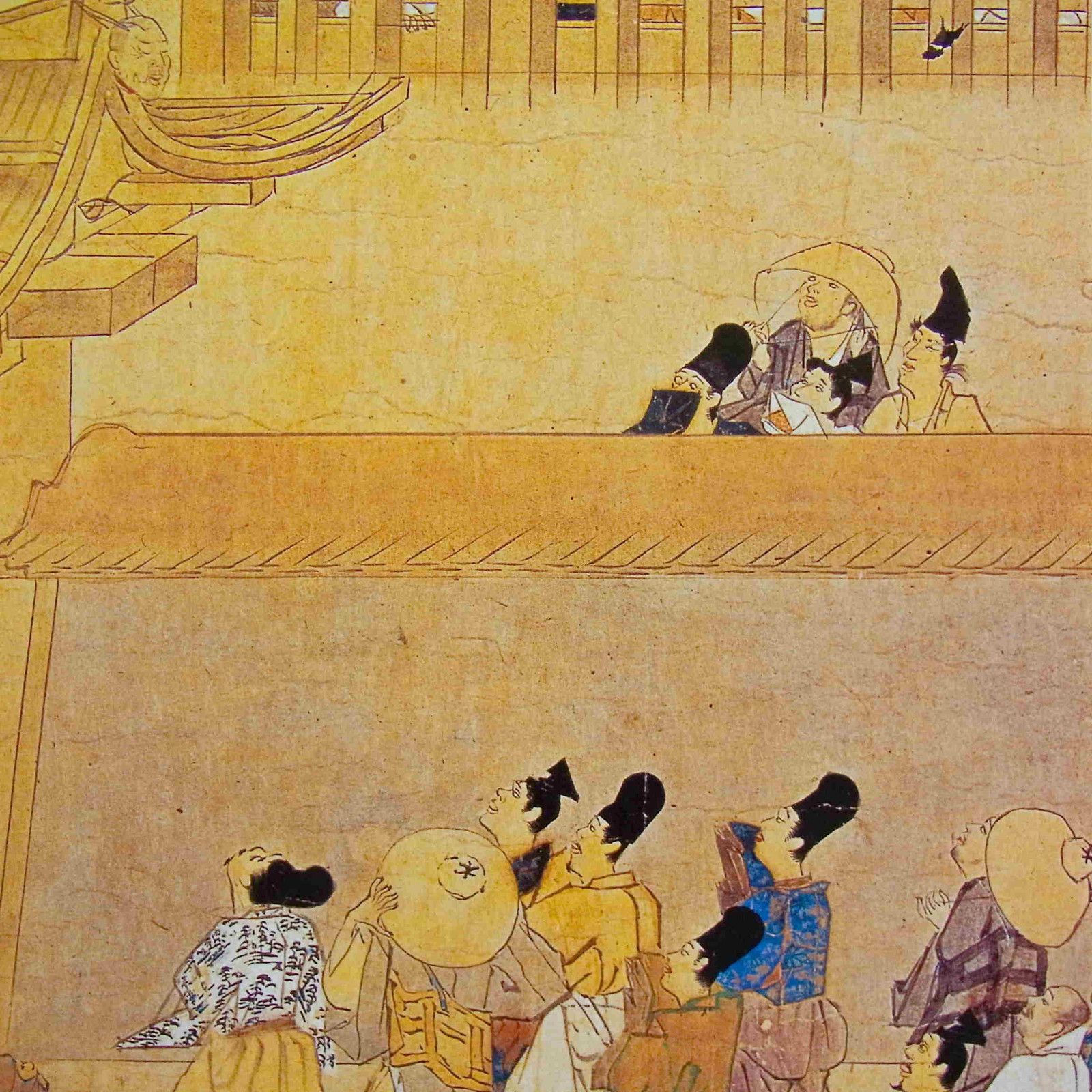
People was looking at hanging Shinzei's head

Nobuyori and the Minamoto set fire to the Sanjō Palace and abducted both Emperor Nijō and the cloistered Emperor Go-Shirakawa. They then turned on Shinzei's home, destroying it and killing all those inside, with the exception of Shinzei himself, who escaped only to be captured in the mountains near Kyoto and decapitated soon afterward.
