= Minamoto no Tameyoshi =

Japanese samurai

- 源 為義
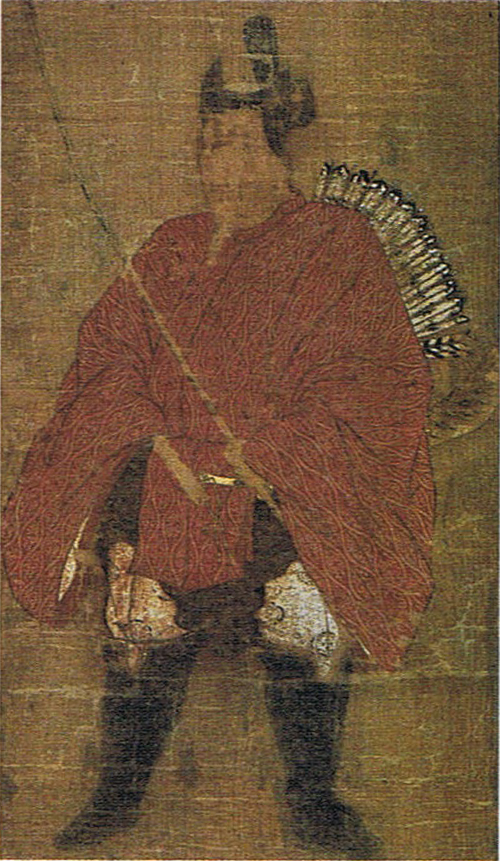
- Minamoto no Tameyoshi, from the collection of Shiramine Jingū

Head of Kawachi Genji
- Succeeded by: Minamoto no Yoshitomo

Personal details
- Born: 1096
- Died: August 17, 1156 (aged 59–60)
- Resting place: Gongen-ji, in Sujakuurahata-chō, Shimodagyō-ku, Kyōto
- Spouse: Daughter of Fujiwara no Tadakiyo
- Children: Minamoto no Yoshitomo (son); Minamoto no Tametomo (son); Minamoto no Yukiie (son)
- Parents: Minamoto no Yoshichika (father); Unknown (mother)

Military service
- Allegiance: Minamoto clan
- Branch/service: Minamoto clan
- Battles/wars: Hōgen Rebellion

Minamoto no Tameyoshi (源 為義; 1096 – August 17, 1156) was a Japanese samurai lord in the Heian period, who was the head of the Minamoto clan during his lifetime. He was the son of Minamoto no Yoshichika, son of Minamoto no Yoshiie. He led the Minamoto in the Hōgen Rebellion. He was also known as Mutsu Shirō (陸奥 四郎).

Tameyoshi carried the baggage of being the son of Yoshichika, whose rebellion had to be put down by their patriarch Yoshiie (staining the Minamoto line's reputation)—before being defeated by their rivals in the Taira clan. The perceived reputational weakness dogged him to the extent that Taira no Tadamori tended to be favored in court appointments over him during this time.

Though he was most famous for his involvement in the Hōgen Rebellion, Minamoto no Tameyoshi is also said to have intervened in a number of other conflicts earlier in his life. Around 1113, the ongoing rivalry between the warrior monks of Mii-dera and Enryaku-ji erupted into outright violence in the streets of Kyoto. Though the palace guard mobilized quickly to protect the Emperor, it is said that Tameyoshi, with a handful of mounted samurai, drove the mobs away himself.

Upon being defeated in the Hōgen Rebellion, Tameyoshi took the tonsure and was released into the custody of his son Minamoto no Yoshitomo who then beheaded him personally. This was an unprecedented breaking of Buddhist values in Japan, yet no one in the court berated Yoshitomo for his actions at the time until after his death.

== Family ==
- Father: Minamoto no Yoshichika (? - 1108)
- Mother: Unknown
  - Wife: Daughter of Fujiwara no Tadakiyo (藤原忠清の娘)
    - 1st son: Minamoto no Yoshitomo (源義朝, 1123–1160)
    - 2nd son: Minamoto no Tametomo (源為朝, 1139–1170)
    - 3rd son: Minamoto no Yukiie (源行家, 1143–1186)

== See also ==
- Siege of Shirakawa-den
