= Hōgan-biiki =

Japanese term

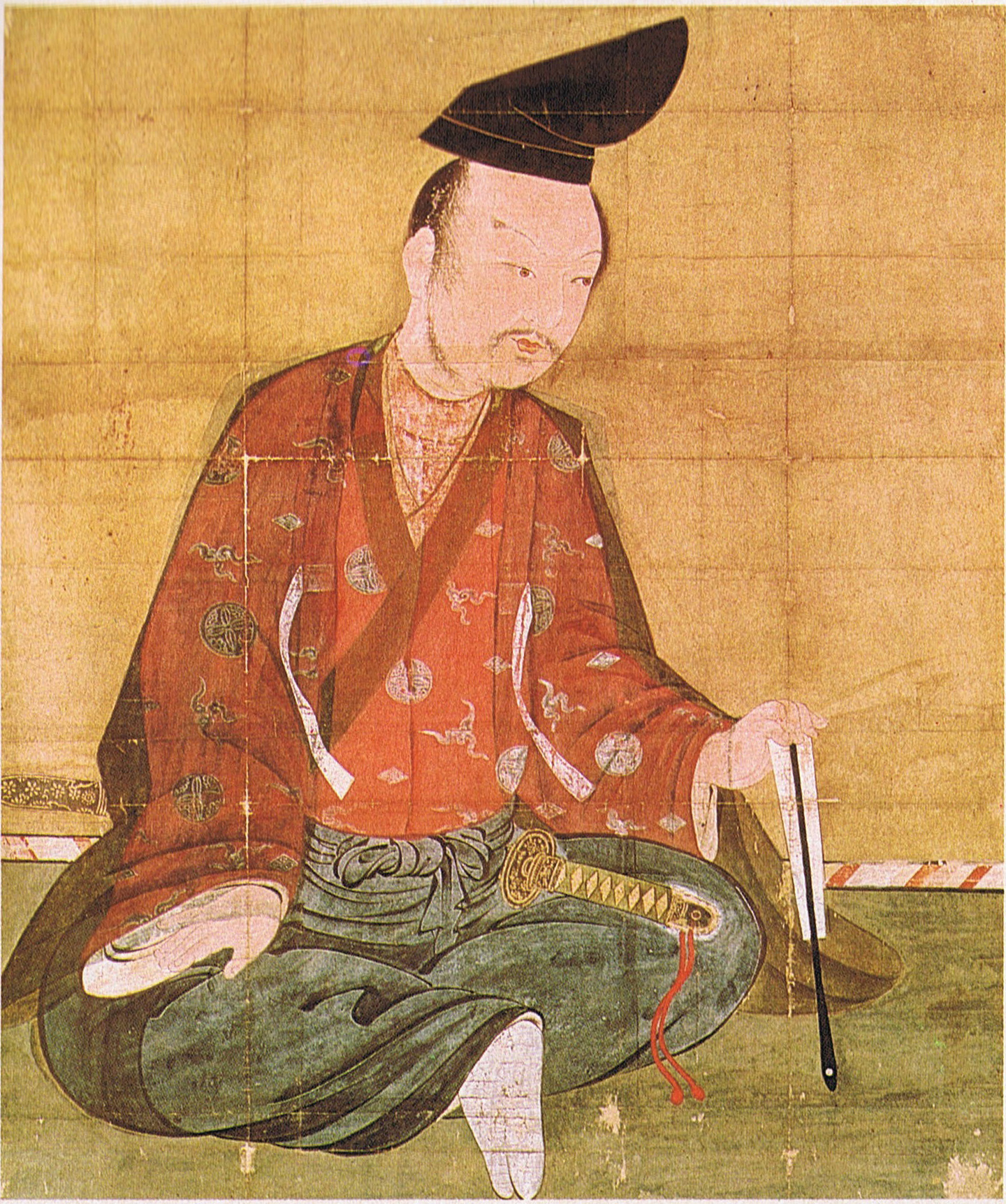
Portrait of Minamoto no Yoshitsune held at Chūson-ji

Hōgan-biiki (Japanese: 判官贔屓) is a term that has come to describe a physiological phenomenon where people extend sympathy to those in weaker or disadvantaged positions without critically assessing the rights and wrongs of their situation. It primarily refers to the sympathetic or pitying sentiment people feel towards Minamoto no Yoshitsune, often lacking an objective perspective.

The term "Hōgan" is typically read as "Hangan" but is traditionally pronounced "Hōgan" in the context of Yoshitsune's legends and Kabuki performances.

== Primary meaning ==
=== Overview ===
Minamoto no Yoshitsune played a prominent role in the latter half of the Genpei War, pursuing the Taira clan. However, he incurred the displeasure of his brother, Minamoto no Yoritomo, due to several actions. These included his failure to recover the Kusanagi no Tsurugi (one of the Imperial Regalia of Japan) during the Battle of Dan-no-ura (Note: Yoshitsune's right-hand man, Nakahara Nobuyasu, recorded the results of the Battle of Dan-no-ura as "Although the Naishi-dokoro and the sacred seal were found, the sword was lost," and this record was reported to Yoritomo) and his unauthorized acceptance of the titles Saemon no Jō (Junior Lieutenant of the Left Gate Guards) and Kebiishi (Imperial Police) from Emperor Go-Shirakawa, bypassing Yoritomo's approval. Additionally, Yoshitsune independently disciplined and commanded Gokenin (vassals of Yoritomo). His behavior, perceived as arrogant, was further criticized by Minamoto no Noriyori, who led the Taira campaign, and Kajiwara no Kagetoki, dispatched by Yoritomo as an overseer. These reports worsened Yoritomo's opinion of Yoshitsune.

In response to Yoritomo's anger, Yoshitsune submitted a written oath to explain himself, but this only deepened Yoritomo's resentment, who remarked, "Having acted freely until now, a last-minute explanation is unacceptable," and "To offer excuses only after learning of my displeasure is unforgivable."

Yoritomo refused Yoshitsune entry to Kamakura when he arrived from Kyoto with captured Taira leader Taira no Munemori and others. Additionally, after Yoshitsune reportedly stated upon returning to Kyoto that "those who harbor grudges against Kamakura should join me," Yoritomo confiscated the former Taira lands previously granted to him. Despite this, Yoritomo initially gave Yoshitsune a chance to redeem himself by entrusting him with the task of pursuing and killing Minamoto no Yukiie, but Yoshitsune, feigning illness, refused to comply, leading an enraged Yoritomo to designate him as a target for elimination.

Learning of assassins sent by Yoritomo, Yoshitsune sought an imperial edict to oppose him but gained little support. He fled to Ōshū, Iwate under the protection of Fujiwara no Hidehira. After Hidehira's death, however, his son Fujiwara no Yasuhira, succumbing to Yoritomo's pressure, forced Yoshitsune to take his own life. Yoshitsune's tragic end evoked widespread sympathy, with people lamenting, "How unjust life is that such a remarkable figure should meet such a fate."

The term "Hōgan" derives from Yoshitsune’s role as Saemon no Jō, a third-rank officer in the Left Gate Guards, or his position as a Kebiishi lieutenant. It’s believed that the phrase "Hōgan-biiki" emerged between the late Muromachi period and the early Edo period, or possibly as early as the mid-Muromachi period. One of the earliest documented uses appears in the haiku anthology Kebukigusa (compiled in 1638), edited by Edo-period poet Matsue Shigeyori :

The world, like cherry blossoms, favors Hōgan; spring breeze blows.

Such a haiku is cited.

=== Hōgan-biiki and Minamoto no Yoritomo, Kajiwara Kagetoki ===
Historian Masataka Uwayokote argues that the perception of Yoshitsune as a victim is central to the origin of Hōgan-biiki, with Minamoto no Yoritomo and Kajiwara Kagetoki, who reported Yoshitsune's overbearing behavior, serving as necessary antagonists.

Uwayokote notes that, despite being a historical record compiled by the Kamakura shogunate, the Azuma Kagami vividly depicts the severity and ruthlessness of Yoritomo and Kagetoki, while including sympathetic descriptions of Yoshitsune. The Azuma Kagami describes the scene of Yoshitsune's head being delivered from Hiraizumi to Kosigoe: "All who saw it wiped away tears, their sleeves soaked. (Note: The Azuma Kagami describes the scene in which Yoshitsune's head is delivered from Hiraizumi to Koshigoe as "everyone wiping away tears and wetting their robes.) He suggests that, as a text justifying the Hōjō clan's position, it naturally portrays Kagetoki, who was ruined by the Hōjō, as a villain. However, this portrayal contributed to establishing Hōgan-biiki, casting Yoshitsune as a popular and virtuous figure aligned with the Hōjō camp. Uwayokote argues that if Hōgan-biiki was directly or indirectly manipulated by the Hōjō, its historical significance warrants reevaluation. Historian Takayuki Okutomi adds that the Azuma Kagami adopts the view that the Hōjō took power to govern justly in place of the Minamoto shoguns. However, direct criticism of Yoritomo, a revered figure among Kamakura warriors, was avoided. Instead, a sophisticated technique was used, portraying Kagetoki as a slanderer whose influence led Yoritomo to drive Yoshitsune to his death, prompting readers to criticize Yoritomo indirectly. Okutomi further asserts that the Azuma Kagami deliberately fostered Hōgan-biiki to critique Yoritomo.

On the other hand, It’s believed that Kagetoki’s reports were a natural consequence of his role as an overseer appointed by Yoritomo. Other warriors besides Kagetoki also disapproved of Yoshitsune’s disregard for Yoritomo’s orders and his self-serving actions. Yoritomo’s decision to target Yoshitsune was based on upholding the regime’s ethics, not personal jealousy or narrow-mindedness, as some claim.

=== Hōgan-biiki in literary works ===
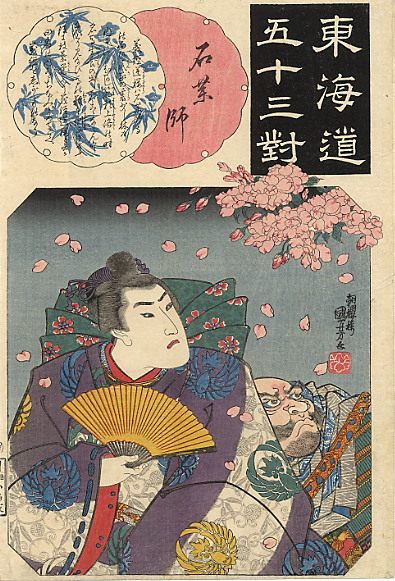
Yoshitsune (left), depicted by Utagawa Kuniyoshi. The Gikeiki portrays Yoshitsune as a beautiful, delicate figure, "worthy of sympathy," with characteristics similar to a woman, enhancing the sentiment of Hōgan-biiki.

Literary works depicting Yoshitsune have been produced in such abundance that they are described as "flooding" the cultural landscape. Works like the Heike Monogatari and Genpei Seisuiki established Yoshitsune as a "flesh-and-blood hero." The military chronicle Gikeiki, considered the "first biography of Yoshitsune," emerged during the Muromachi period. Driven by a desire to narrate history, the Gikeiki created legends by inventing new narratives where historical facts were absent and transforming known history into stories. It elevated Yoshitsune into a "national idol" and a "historical hero" transformed into a "national hero," making Hōgan-biiki a central theme. The Gikeiki became the foundation for a genre known as "Hōgan-mono," encompassing works like Otogizōshi, Yōkyoku, Kyōgen, Bukyoku, Kabuki, and Jōruri (music). In these works, the unified heroic image established by the Gikeiki fragmented into diverse heroic portrayals, creating an idealized Yoshitsune as a figure of admiration and solidifying Hōgan-biiki as hero worship. The narratives constructed around Yoshitsune were accepted by the public without distinction from historical facts, blending into a unified biography. This led to the paradoxical situation where Yoshitsune’s biography became "truly Yoshitsune-like" only through its fictionalization and legendary status. Historian Tomio Takahashi argues that Hōgan-biiki does not refer to general sympathy for Yoshitsune but to a specific form of admiration exemplified by the spirit of the Gikeiki.

The image of Yoshitsune as a figure who shone brilliantly in the Genpei War only to meet a tragic end resonates with the Japanese tradition of Kishu Ryūritan (noble exile narratives). Folklorist Shinobu Orikuchi defines this as "a form of melancholic literature chronicling the life of a noble in exile." (Note: Folklorist Orikuchi Shinobu defines this as "a tragic literary form in which a nobleman is exiled and writes about his experiences.") Takahashi suggests that, in crafting Yoshitsune’s story, people were unsatisfied with a mere warrior’s tale and assigned him the role of a dynastic noble. Folklorist and literary scholar Yasaburō Ikeda notes that Yoshitsune’s biography aligns with the Kishu Ryūritan archetype, as it was shaped to evoke sympathy. (Note: Ikeda cites as an example the fact that in Noh plays, not only Yoshitsune as a boy but also as an adult is played by a child actor.) Ikeda concludes that the reason Yoshitsune’s story evokes sympathy lies not in his actual life but in pre-existing narrative frameworks that shaped it, creating the conditions for the proverb "Hōgan-biiki" even before his life began.

=== Hōgan-biiki and Yoshitsune's survival legend ===
Rumors denying Yoshitsune’s death emerged soon after his demise, giving rise to legends that he escaped to Ezo (Hokkaido) or even to China, where he became Genghis Khan. These legends are now regarded as products of Hōgan-biiki, reflecting a desire to spare Yoshitsune from death. They have been dismissed as "Edo-period fantasies born of a closed country," or "imaginings created by someone, somewhere, out of sympathy for a hero’s tragic end."

The legend of Yoshitsune fleeing to Hokkaido originated in the Honchō Tsugan (1670) of the writer Hayashi Shunsai’s , coinciding with growing Japanese interest in Ezo. (Note: In his book Ainu Lore and Folklore, the British missionary John Batchelor states that this legend was imposed on the Ainu by Japanese people interested in Ezo.) The tale of Yoshitsune becoming Genghis Khan emerged in the Meiji era with Yahachi Uchida’s Yoshitsune Saikōki (1885), during a period when Japan sought expansion into the Chinese mainland.

== Expanded meaning ==
According to Masataka Uwayokote, the Japanese have traditionally held sentiments akin to Hōgan-biiki even before the term’s emergence. Yasaburō Ikeda defines this as a psychological tendency to uncritically applaud actions that support the weak and oppose the strong, often taking the form of rash sympathy devoid of fair judgment or calm criticism. By the early Edo period, "Hōgan-biiki" had evolved beyond sympathy for Yoshitsune to describe a general tendency to sympathize with the disadvantaged without critically evaluating their situation. (Note: Ikeda cites an example of its use in Chikamatsu Monzaemon's Shinju Yoi Koshin as evidence for his argument.) Takayuki Okutomi notes that even the primary sense of Hōgan-biiki grew exaggerated, leading people to view Yoshitsune as just and Yoritomo as cruel or evil, losing objective perspective.

Ikeda suggests that the term "Hōgan-biiki" became associated with this broader phenomenon because Yoshitsune’s biography was widely known and inherently evoked sympathy. Considering at that time, historical accuracy was less important than the narrative’s ability to resonate with public sentiment, the biography of Yoshitsune was restructured to align with sympathy and amplify it.

== See also ==
- Underdog effect

== Bibliography ==
- Ikeda, Yasaburō (1979). 日本芸能伝承論 [On the Transmission of Japanese Performing Arts] (in Japanese). Tokyo: Chūō Kōron-sha. ISBN 978-4-12-000069-0.
- Ueyokote, Masataka (1997). 源平の盛衰 [The Rise and Fall of the Genpei]. Kōdansha Gakujutsu Bunko 1275 (in Japanese). Tokyo: Kōdansha. ISBN 978-4-06-159275-9.
- Ueyokote, Masataka (2004). 源義経 源平内乱と英雄の実像 [Minamoto no Yoshitsune: The Genpei Civil War and the True Image of the Hero]. Heibonsha Library 519 (in Japanese). Tokyo: Heibonsha. ISBN 978-4-582-76519-9.
- Okutomi, Takayuki (2004). 源義経の悲劇 [The Tragedy of Minamoto no Yoshitsune]. Kadokawa Sensho 370 (in Japanese). Tokyo: Kadokawa Shoten. ISBN 978-4-04-703370-2.
- Gomi, Fumihiko (2004). 源義経 [Minamoto no Yoshitsune]. Iwanami Shinsho New Red Edition 914 (in Japanese). Tokyo: Iwanami Shoten. ISBN 978-4-00-430914-7.
- Suzuki, Kenichi (literary scholar) (2004). 義経伝説 判官びいき集大成 [Yoshitsune Legend: The Culmination of Hōgan-biiki] (in Japanese). Tokyo: Shogakukan. ISBN 978-4-09-626133-0.
- Takahashi, Tomio (1979). 義経伝説 [Yoshitsune Legend]. Chūkō Shinsho 115 (in Japanese). Tokyo: Chūō Kōron-sha. ISBN 978-4-12-100115-3.
- Yasuda, Motohisa (2004). 源義経 [Minamoto no Yoshitsune] (in Japanese). Tokyo: Shinjinbutsu Ōraisha. ISBN 978-4-404-03222-5.
- Wakamori, Tarō (1991). 判官びいきと日本人 [Hōgan-biiki and the Japanese]. Orient Books (in Japanese). Tokyo: Kibiji-sha. ISBN 978-4-8393-7539-3.
- Watanabe, Tamotsu (1986). 源義経 [Minamoto no Yoshitsune]. Characters Series New Edition (in Japanese). Tokyo: Yoshikawa Kōbunkan. ISBN 978-4-642-05042-5.
