= Takadachi Gikeidō =

Buddhist chapel in Iwate Prefecture, Japan

- 高館義経堂
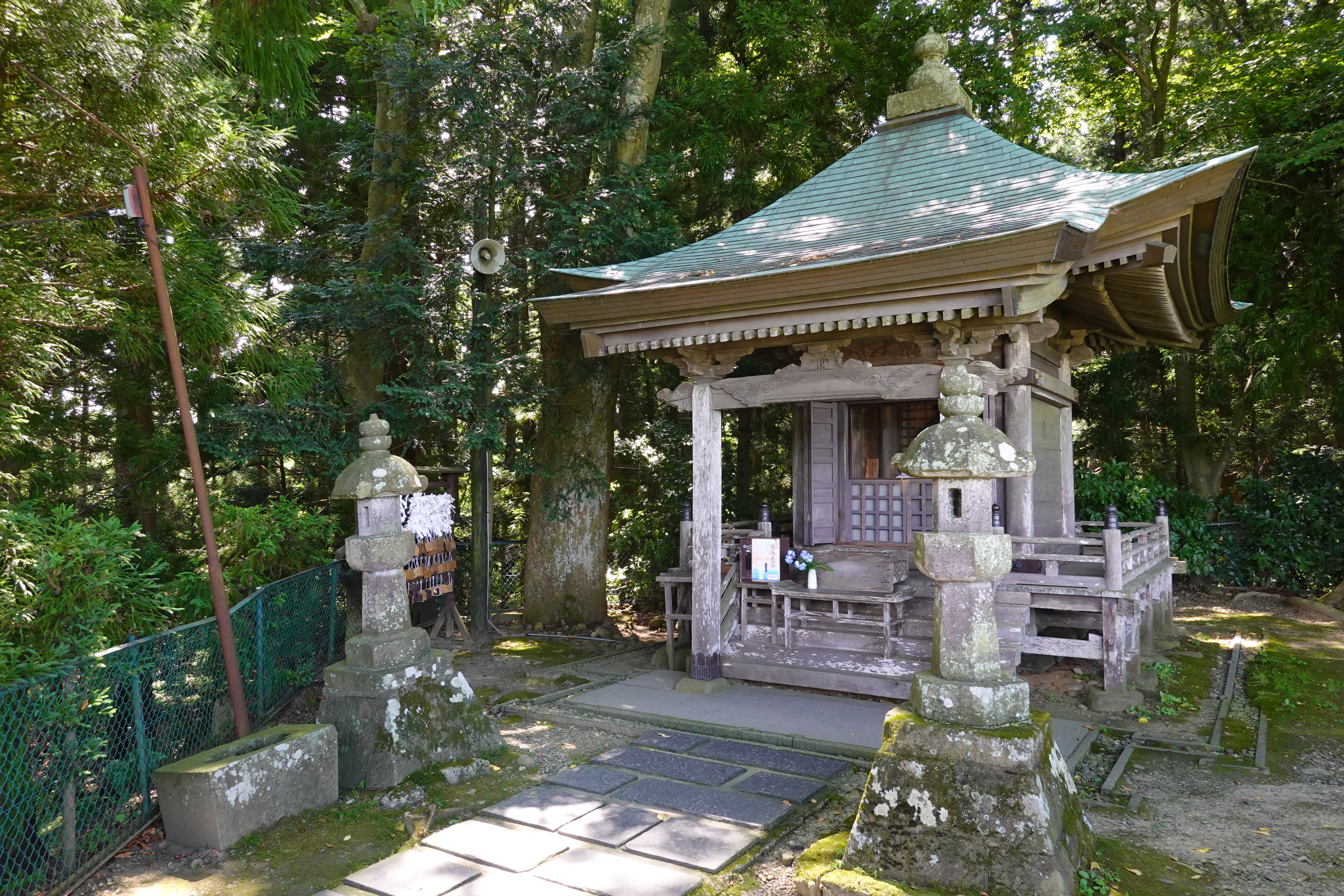
- Takadachi Gikeidō

- Location within Iwate Prefecture Location within Japan

Religion
- Affiliation: Buddhist

Location
- Country: Japan
- Interactive map of Takadachi Gikeidō
- Coordinates: 38°59′50.25″N 141°6′48.75″E

Architecture
- Founder: Date Tsunamura
- Completed: 1683

Takadachi Gikeidō (高館義経堂) is a Buddhist chapel located in Hiraizumi in what is now southern Iwate Prefecture in the Tōhoku region of Japan, dedicated to Minamoto no Yoshitsune. It was designated a nationally designated Place of Scenic Beauty in 2014 as part of the Landscapes of the Oku no Hosomichi. It is managed by neighboring Mōtsū-ji.

== Overview ==
The chapel is located on the site of the Battle of Koromogawa, and was built on the ruins of the Koromogawa Palace (衣川館, Koromogawa-no-tachi) of Fujiwara no Motohari as was mentioned in the Azuma Kagami. The palace was located on a hill overlooking the Kitakami River some 500 meters east-southeast of the temple of Chūson-ji. In 1189, it was occupied by Fujiwara no Yasuhira, who extended shelter to Minamoto no Yoshitsune after the latter had a falling out with his brother, Minamoto no Yoritomo. This provided Yoritomo with a pretext to declare war on the Northern Fujiwara and his forces quickly overran the defenses of Hiraizumi. The palace was destroyed and was the site of Yoshitsune's last stand with his faithful retainer Benkei, as was celebrated in the medieval account Gikeiki.

In 1683, the 4th daimyō of Sendai Domain, Date Tsunamura built a memorial chapel on the site, and enshrined a statue of Yotsushine. This was visited by famed poet, Matsuo Basho in 1689, and a memorial stelae was later erected commemorating a famous haiku Basho wrote about this site.

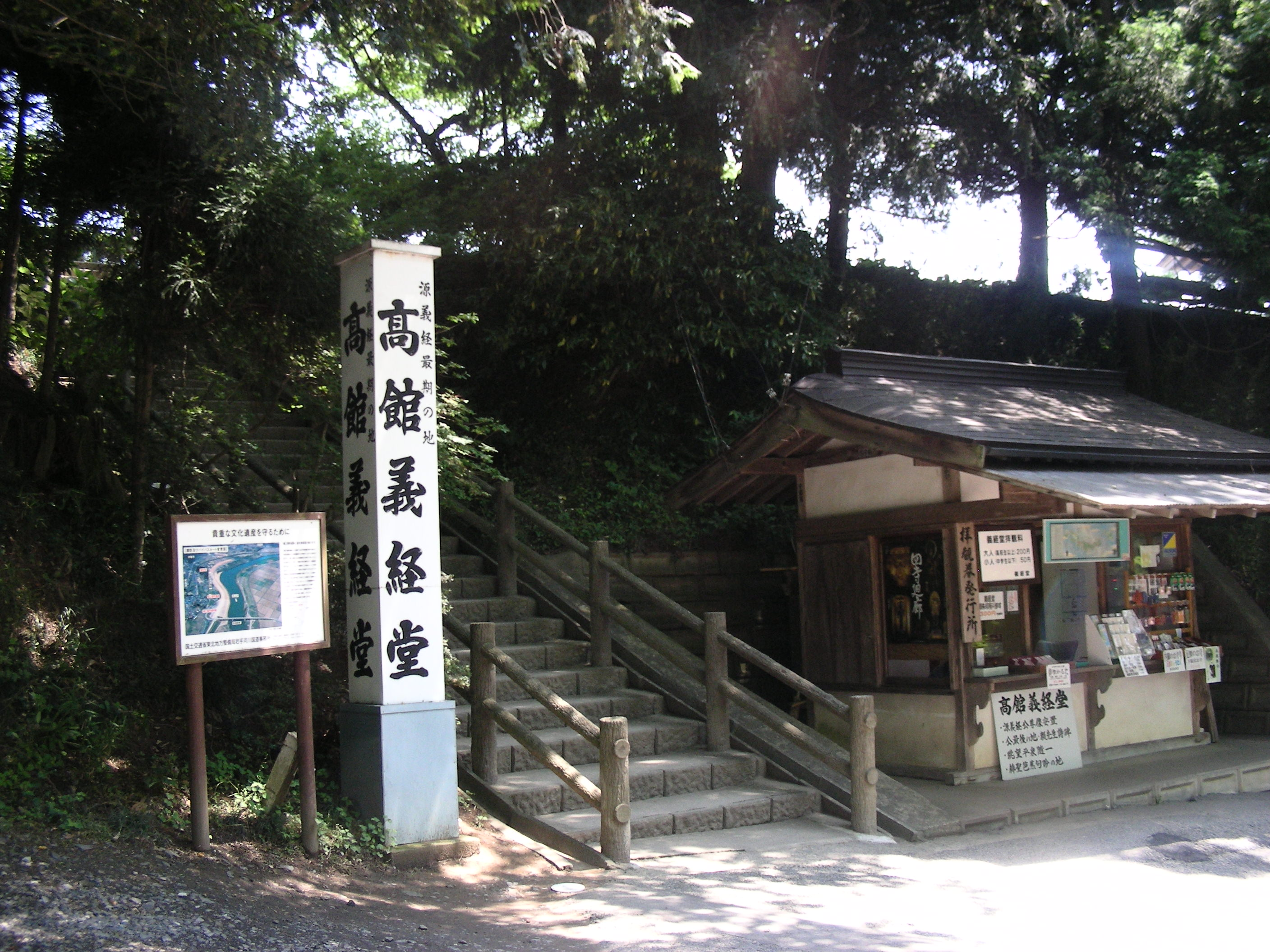
Entrance

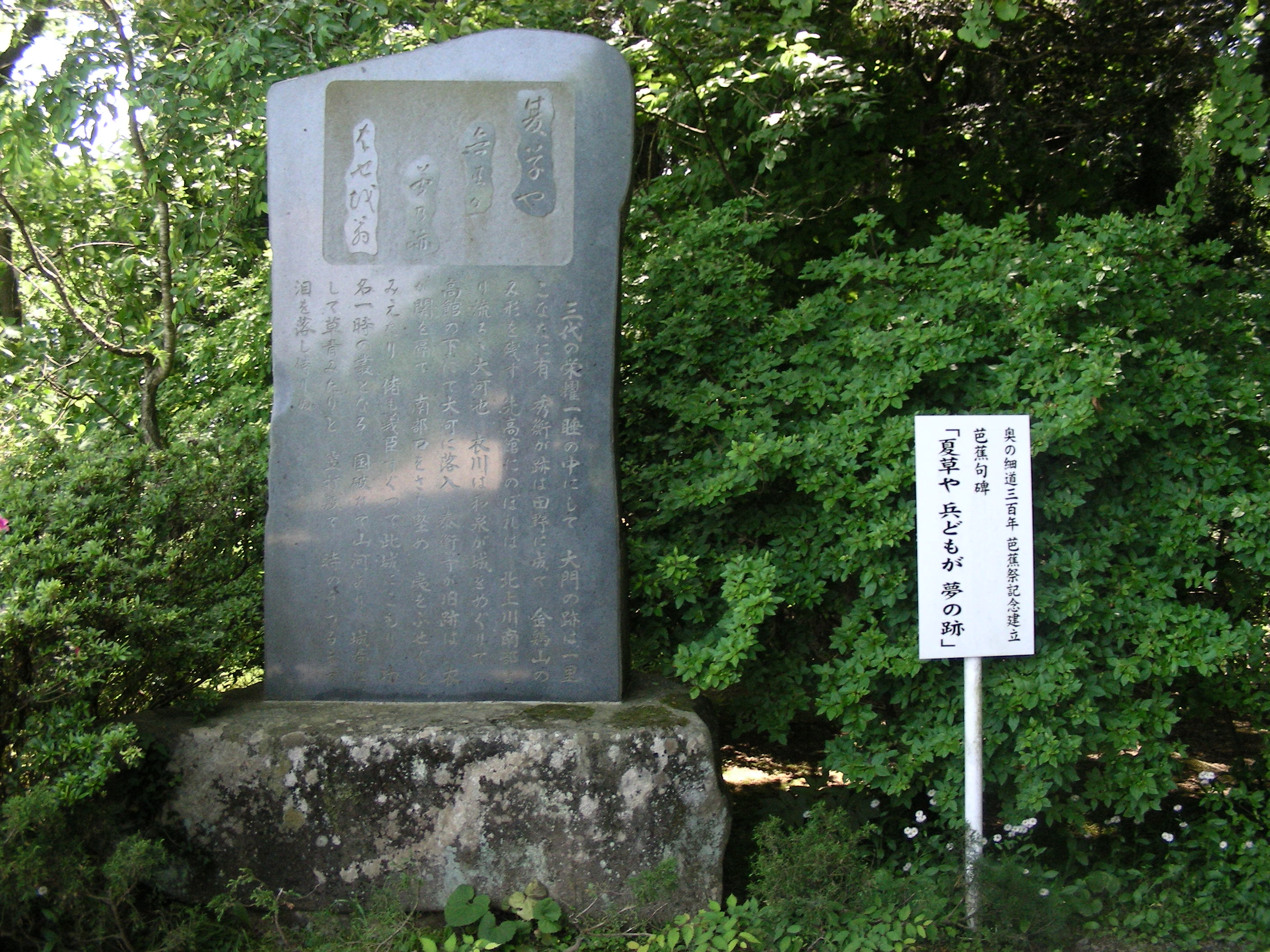
Basho memorial

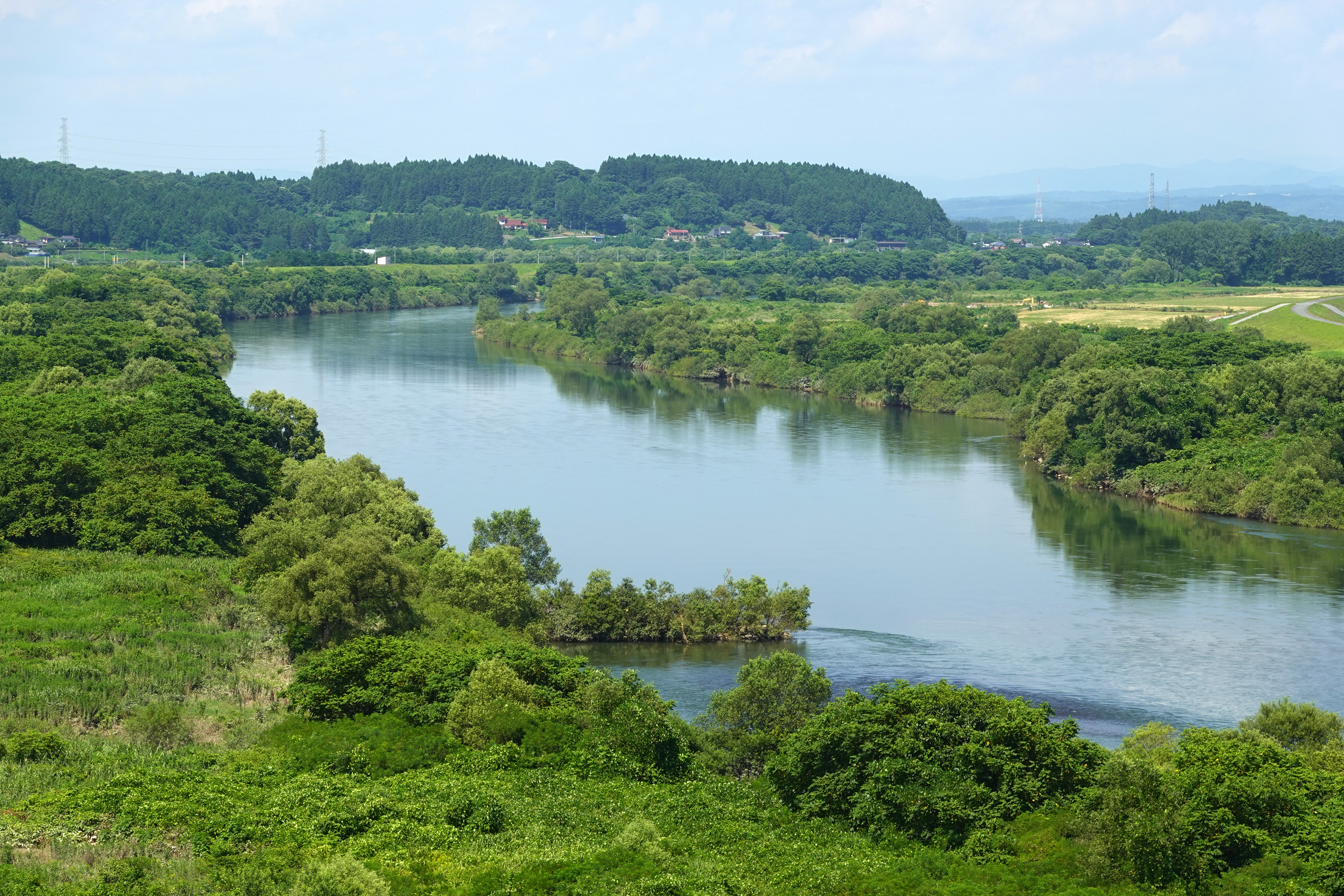
View of the Kitakami River

== See also ==
- List of Places of Scenic Beauty of Japan (Iwate)
