= Battle of Ōshū =

1189 battle in Tōhoku, Japan

Battle of Ōshū 奥州合戦
- Part of the Genpei War
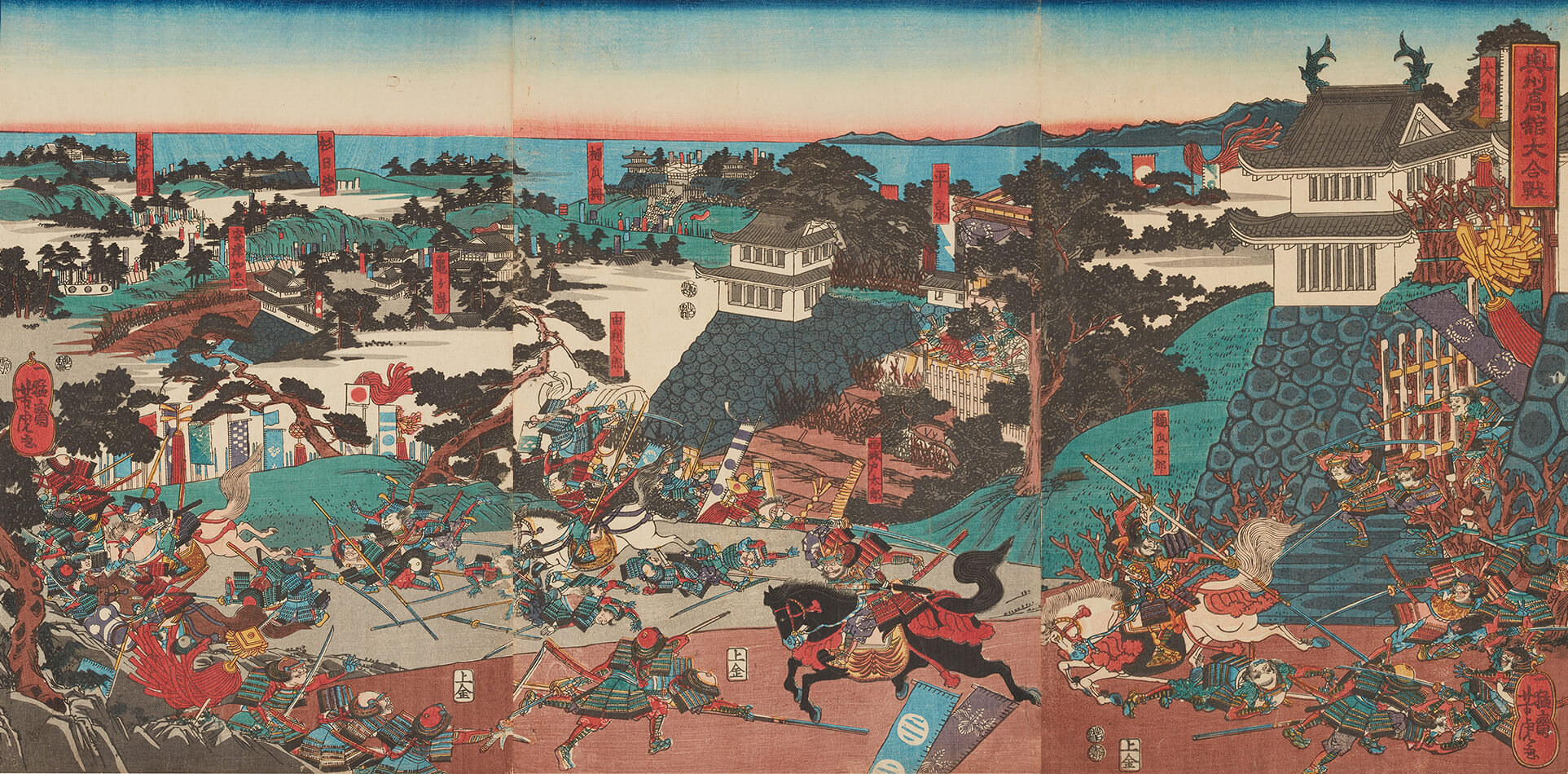
- Scene of the Battle of Ōshū
Date	September 1 – October 14, 1189
Location	Tōhoku, Japan
Result	Kamakura government victory; destruction of Northern Fujiwara
Territorial changes	Minamoto no Yoritomo gains command of Japan

Belligerents
Minamoto clan	Northern Fujiwara

Commanders and leaders
Minamoto no Yoritomo	Fujiwara no Yasuhira †

Strength
284,000 cavalrymen	170,000 cavalrymen

Casualties and losses
Unknown	Fall of Hiraizumi

The Battle of Ōshū (奥州合戦, Ōshū-kassen) was a major battle between the Kamakura government and the Northern Fujiwara that took place in the Tōhoku region of Japan from September 1 to October 14, 1189. It resulted in the downfall of the Northern Fujiwara and the completion of Minamoto no Yoritomo's nationwide domination through the annexation of Mutsu and Dewa Province by the Kamakura shogunate. It was the last battle of the period of civil war known as the Jishō-Juei War that began in 1180, and its end marked the establishment of the first military government, the Kamakura shogunate.

== Terminology ==
Many ancient documents related to the mobilization of troops on the Kamakura side refer to this war as Okuiri (奥入), and abbreviation meaning the "Ōshū incursion"; other documents refer to it as Ōshu-tsuitō (奥州追討, "punitive expedition of Ōshū") or Ōshu-kassen (奥州合戦, "Ōshū War"). The Azuma Kagami, a history book written by the Kamakura shogunate, refers to the battle as Ōshu-seibatsu (奥州征伐, "Ōshu conquest"), but there are also passages that refer to it as Ōshu-kassen.

After the Meiji era (1868–1912), the battle was called Ōshu-seibatsu (奥州征伐, "Ōshū conquest/subjugation) by historians. In 1978, historian Nobuo Irimada pointed out that this term is biased, as it is only a conquest from the perspective of the Kamakura shogunate, and suggested the term Ōshū-kassen (Ōshū War/Battle) to be used. After this, the term Ōshū-kassen became the most common or accepted term for this conflict by the end of the 20th century.

== Background ==
In 1189 the Northern Fujiwara clan had ruled the Mutsu and Dewa Provinces for just over a century, since 1087. The Northern Fujiwara was founded by Fujiwara no Kiyohira, along with Minamoto no Yoshiie, who became independent and established themselves in Hiraizumi (in present-day Iwate Prefecture). Along with Kiyohira, the next two generations of Fujiwara no Motohira and Hidehira saw the zenith of Northern Fujiwara's power in the Tōhoku region. They introduced the high culture of Heian into the area and built many temples, such as the Chūson-ji founded in 1095.

During the Genpei War (1180-1185), fought between the Minamoto clan and the Taira clan, the Northern Fujiwara remained neutral. When the Genpei War was over in 1185 with the victory of the Minamoto clan and the destruction of the Taira clan, the Northern Fujiwara had remained neutral until the end and had not participated in the war.

The Battle of Ōshū was caused by a conflict over the extradition of Minamoto no Yoshitsune, who had fled to Hiraizumi. Hidehira had remained neutral during the Genpei War, but when Yoshitsune took refuge in Hiraizumi, he decided to protect him. This severed relations between the Northern Fujiwara and Minamoto no Yoritomo and led to the collision of the two powers.

Hidehira, who had protected Yoshitsune, soon died and his son Fujiwara no Yasuhira succeeded his father as the 4th head of the Northern Fujiwara clan. Yasuhira failed to resist Minamoto no Yoritomo's pressure, and had Yoshitsune assassinated during the Battle of Koromo River on June 15, 1189. Yoshitsune's severed head was delivered by Fujiwara no Takahira to Kamakura for Yoritomo to see and arrived on July 7. The head was inspected by Wada Yoshimori and Kajiwara Kagetoki. On July 22, a court order to halt combat from Emperor Go-Shirakawa arrived in Kamakura. However, Yoritomo was already set about attacking Hiraizumi and this had no effect to fix the damaged relations.

== Call to arms ==
On August 8, Yoritomo requested the Imperial Court in Kyoto to order the punitive expedition of Fujiwara no Yasuhira. Following the request, the next day, a revolt took place in Ōshū resulting in the death of Fujiwara no Tadahira, who had supported the protection of Yoshitsune as the son of Hidehira. On August 30, Yoritomo discussed the conquest on Ōshū with his general Ōba Kageyoshi.

However, before the court could make a decision, Yoritomo decided to set out on his own expedition. According to Azuma Kagami, his call to arms included 284,000 cavalrymen from more than 60 provinces of Japan, including from southern Kyushu, all gathered to attack Hiraizumi.

In the meantime, Yasuhira had prepared himself an army of 170,000 cavalrymen.

On August 30, Yoritomo and his forces spent the whole day planning the attack. Yoritomo divided his army into three groups, Tōkaidō, Ōte and Hokurikudō forces. The next day, the Hokurikudō forces left Kamakura. On September 1, Yoritomo and his central Ōte forces left Kamakura and began their advance towards the north. A prisoner from Echigo Province, Jō Nagamochi, joined the forces.

== Defeat of Northern Fujiwara ==
The central forces, led by Yoritomo himself, advanced towards the north, and arrived at Kotahashi Station in Shimotsuke Province on September 7. There, Yoritomo offered a wand with hemp and paper to the gods at Utsunomiya Shrine. He left Utsunomiya the next day and added Satake Hideyoshi from Mutsu Province to the army. On September 10, Yoritomo arrived at Nitobe Station and over 200 retainers of Jō Nagamochi joined the army.

On September 11, Yoritomo broke through the Shirakawa Barrier, and on September 18, his forces arrived at Kunimi Station. On September 19, Yoritomo's forces attacked the Northern Fujiwara forces at Mount Atsukashi. They then fought at Ishinazaka and Nenashifuji, resulting in the deaths of Fujiwara no Kunihira, Kongō no Bettō Hidetsuna, Satō Motoharu and Satō Kinjūrō. On September 21, Yoritomo defeated the Northern Fujiwara forces and continued northwards. The next day, Yoritomo inspected Kunihira's head in Funabasama.

By September 23, they had taken over Taga Castle in Mutsu Province and joined with his Tōkaidō forces. Yasuhira was forced to abandon his main military base at Kokubugahara Muchidate (present-day Tsutsuji-gaoka, Sendai). The next day, the Hokurikudō forces defeated Tagawa Yukibumi and Akita Munebumi in Dewa Province. On September 25, Yoritomo's retainer Oyama Tomomasa defeated Northern Fujiwara forces in Monomigaoka and Yoritomo advanced to Takahaba Castle in Tamatsukuri. On October 1, Yoritomo was victorious and captured Takahaba Castle. His forces then headed for Hiraizumi. This caused Yasuhira to abandon and flee his capital city Hiraizumi. He used a scorched-earth strategy and left Hiraizumi in flames on October 2.

Yoritomo entered the burnt-down Hiraizumi the next day on October 3, defeating all remaining forces and capturing Hiraizumi Castle. On October 6, Fujiwara no Motonari and his sons surrendered at Koromo River Palace. The next day, a letter from Yasuhira hinting at surrender was delivered to Yoritomo. After a couple of days, on October 13, Yoritomo headed to Kuriyagawa Barrier in Iwate in a manhunt for Yasuhira. The next day, Yasuhira was caught by Yoritomo's forces north of Hiraizumi, and was killed by Kawada Jirō in Nienosaku, Hinai, Mutsu Province (present-day Ōdate, Akita Prefecture).

The Battle of Ōshū resulted in the victory of Minamoto no Yoritomo and his forces and the defeat of the Northern Fujiwara. This marked the end of the period of civil war that began in 1180, and the completion of Yoritomo's nationwide domination through the annexation of Mutsu and Dewa Province by the newly established Kamakura shogunate.

== Aftermath ==
After Yasuhira was killed, Yoritomo's forces arrived in Jingaoka, Shiwa with the Hokurikudō forces on October 15, 1189. Two days later, Kawada Jirō delivered Yasuhira's head to Yoritomo. Following the tradition from the Former Nine Years' War, Yoritomo gibbeted Yasuhira's head by nailing it down.

On October 18, Yasuhira's attendant Yuri Korehira was captured. Yoritomo met with Korehira because of his bravery and told him, "Yasuhira was wielding power in Ōshū and I thought it would be difficult to punish him, but he was put to death by Kawada Jirō alone because he did not have a good attendant. Although he ruled both provinces and led 170,000 cavalrymen, his entire clan perished within 20 days. The rest is hardly worth mentioning." Korehira responded, "The former Head of Left Division of Bureau of Horses [Minamoto no Yoshitomo] ruled fifteen provinces by the Tōkaidō, but he could not sustain himself for a single day during the Heiji Rebellion and fell, though he was the commander of tens of thousands of cavalrymen, Nagata Tadamune killed him. Is there any superiority or inferiority between now and the past? Yasuhira led only a handful of warriors from both provinces, and he harassed Lord Yoritomo for tens of days. It would not be an easy conclusion to make."

On October 19, Yoritomo sent a courier to Kyoto to spread the word of his victory. Although the Imperial Court never accepted Yoritomo's request during the battle, the order was delivered to Yoritomo after the battle had ended in the form of a retrospective approval. On October 20, Ichijō Yoshiyasu sent a court order for the punitive expedition of Yasuhira from Kyoto to Yoritomo in Jingaoka, which was dated September 1, 1189.

On October 22, Yoritomo left Jingaoka to stay at Kuriyagawa Barrier, and eight days later, he headed to Hiraizumi. He then appointed Kasai Kiyoshige Magistrate (bugyō) of Mutsu Province. Minamoto no Yoritomo and his forces left Ōshū and returned to Kamakura on November 8, 1189.

== Meaning ==
In the Battle of Ōshū, Minamoto no Yoritomo mobilized warriors from the whole country, including Satsuma Province in southern Kyushu, Ise and Aki Province, which were former strongholds of the Taira clan, as well as provinces that had formerly been under the control of the Taira clan, Minamoto no Yoshinaka, and Minamoto no Yoshitsune. However, the mobilization was limited to those "worthy of arms", as described in Yoritomo's letter from February 9, 1189. In addition, Yoritomo punished retainers who would not participate by confiscating their domains. This, together with the fact that Yoritomo himself had not went to war since the call to arms at the beginning of the Genpei War, suggests that he had a political intention to establish the gokenin who would follow him. For Yoritomo, the Battle of Ōshū was an opportunity to achieve this goal.

== Major figures ==
Minamoto no Yoritomo

=== Kamakura government ===
- Minamoto no Yoritomo, head of the Kamakura government
- Retainers:
  - Kawada Jirō, killed Yasuhira
  - Oyama Tomomasa, conquered Monomigaoka
  - Satake Hideyoshi
  - Jō Nagamochi

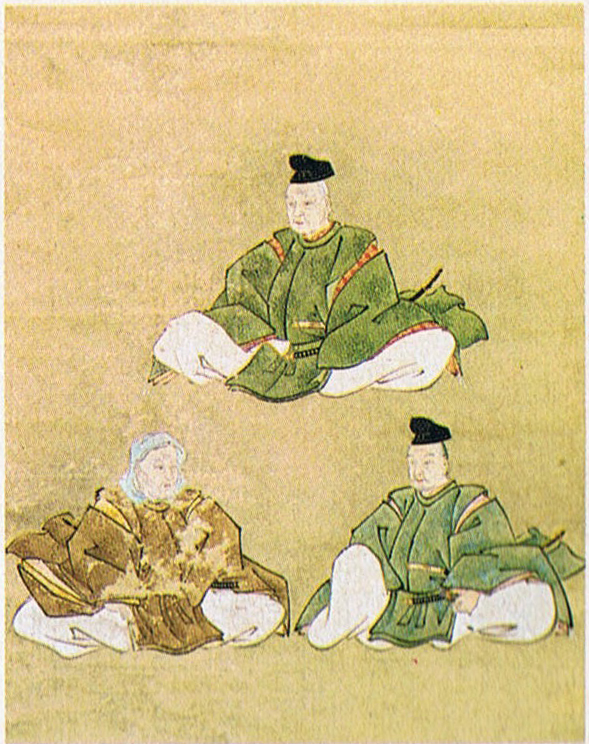
Three generations of Northern Fujiwara: Kiyohira, Motohira and Hidehira

=== Northern Fujiwara ===
- Fujiwara no Hidehira, 3rd head of the Northern Fujiwara
- Fujiwara no Yasuhira, 4th head of the Northern Fujiwara
- Fujiwara no Motonari, advisor and grandfather of Yasuhira
- Fujiwara no Kunihira, eldest son of Hidehira
- Retainers:
  - Yuri Korehira, attendant of Yasuhira
  - Kongō no Bettō Hidetsuna
  - Satō Motoharu
  - Satō Kinjūrō
  - Tagawa Yukibumi
  - Akita Munebumi

== See also ==
- Genpei War
- Battle of Koromo River
- Mutsu Province
- Hiraizumi
