= Letter from Koshigoe =

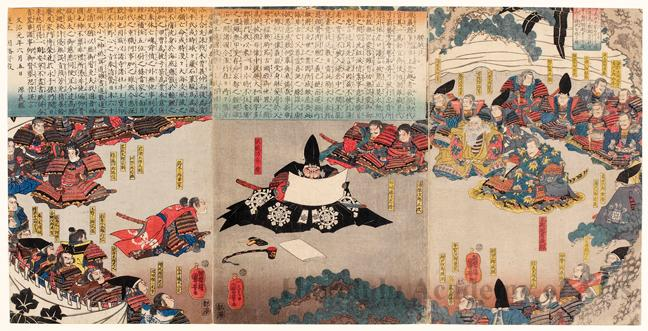
Letter written by Yoshitsune at Koshigoe, nishiki-e print by Utagawa Kuniyoshi

The letter from Koshigoe is a 12th-century document written by Minamoto no Yoshitsune to Minamoto no Yoritomo from the city of Koshigoe.

== Background ==
Minamoto no Yoshitsune was one of the most important samurai warriors living at the end of the Heian era in 12th century Japan. He led his warriors to victory over the Taira for his half brother Minamoto no Yoritomo in the Genpei wars, and helped to bring about the creation of Japan's first bakufu, or tent government in Kamakura, just south of the little-known fishing village of Edo on the seaside. While fighting the Taira clan, he had a few disagreements with the shogun's favourite advisor, Kajiwara Kagetoki, which proved to be bad for his position when he would later want to meet with the brother he never had time to know as a child growing up. Kajiwara was able to convince Yoritomo that Yoshitsune would be a threat and had to be eliminated, so when Yoshitsune travelled from the capital now known as Kyoto with two high-ranking Taira prisoners, Munemori and his son Kiyomune, he was not allowed to enter the city gates and was forced to wait in Koshigoe nearby. After nine days, Yoshitsune wrote a final plea and pledge of allegiance to Yoritomo, and this letter was translated from the Gikeiki in 1966 by Helen Craig McCullough for her book Yoshitsune: A 15th Century Japanese Chronicle.

== The letter ==
To His Excellency the Governor of Inaba: (Oe no Hiromoto)

I, Minamoto Yoshitsune, venture to address you.

Having overthrown the enemies of the court and erased the infamy of military defeat as His Lordship's deputy and the bearer of an imperial commission, I had supposed that my deeds would be commended; yet, to my distress, pernicious slanders have caused accomplishments of uncommon merit to be ignored. Though innocent, I am blamed; though deserving, and guilty of no error, I have incurred His Lordship's displeasure. What can I do but weep bitter tears! Since I have not been permitted to refute false accusations, or even to enter Kamakura, I have been obliged to remain idle for days, with no means of expressing my feelings. I have been denied the privilege of seeing His Lordship for so long that the blood bond between us seems to have vanished. Is this the karma of a previous existence? Am I being punished for evil acts committed in my last life? Alas! Unless the august spirit of my late father chances to be reborn, who will plead my cause or pity my condition?

At the risk of appearing querulous, I must say to you that never since birth have I enjoyed a moment's peace of mind - never, from the time of my journey in my mother's arms to Uda District in Yamato, an infant orphaned by my father's death. Though able to preserve my useless life, I could not safely frequent the capital but was obliged to skulk in out-of-the-way places, dwell in distant lands, and serve commoners. When at last, through sudden good fortune, I was sent to the capital to crush the Taira clan, I first punished Kiso Yoshinaka and then set about the destruction of the Heike. I whipped my mount over precipitous cliffs, heedless of life in the face of the enemy; I braved the perils of wind and wave on the boundless sea, ready to sink to the bottom as food for monsters of the deep. Battle dress was my pillow; arms were my profession - yet, as in the past, my sole desire was to comfort the unhappy spirits of the dead. As regards my appointment as a lieutenant of fifth rank, was that not a remarkable honor for a member of our family? Yet how deep is my present misery; how acute my suffering! Despairing of obtaining a hearing through any means short of divine assistance, I have repeatedly submitted oaths of loyalty inscribed on the backs of talismans from temples and shrines in Japan, and by the spirits of the underworld, but no pardon has been granted.

This is the land of the gods. Since the gods consider my petitions unworthy, my sole remaining recourse is to implore you to do me the kindness of bringing this message to His Lordship's attention at a suitable time in order to persuade him of my innocence. Once his forgiveness is secured, my heirs and I will rejoice in the "superabundant happiness of accumulated goodness" and I will end my life in peace.

Finding it impossible to write as I feel, I have confined myself to bare essentials.

Humbly and respectfully submitted,

Minamoto Yoshitsune.

Fifth day, sixth month, second year of Genryaku [1185]

== Historicity ==
There is much disagreement among Japanese scholars over whether this letter was ever written or not. It had become over the centuries part of the World of Yoshitsune (Yoshitsune no Sekai) that included books, oral story telling, Noh and Kabuki plays as well as movies and TV dramas.

It has been argued by some that the language used in the text of the letter isn't consistent with the education of an orphaned bushi youngster who had studied with the monks at Kurama temple, but was more likely the product of court educated storytellers who needed to add a little sympathy and drama to the mythology.

Manpukuji temple is a 5-minute walk from Koshigoe station and under a glass panel located there is supposedly the original letter composed by Benkei, and written by Yoshitsune. The temple holds a memorial service on the 3rd Saturday of April annually, during Yoshitsune Matsuri.

== See also ==
- The Tale of the Heike, which mentions the letter
- https://www.nippon.com/en/japan-topics/c10902/
