= Gojo Bridge =

Bridge in Kyoto, Japan

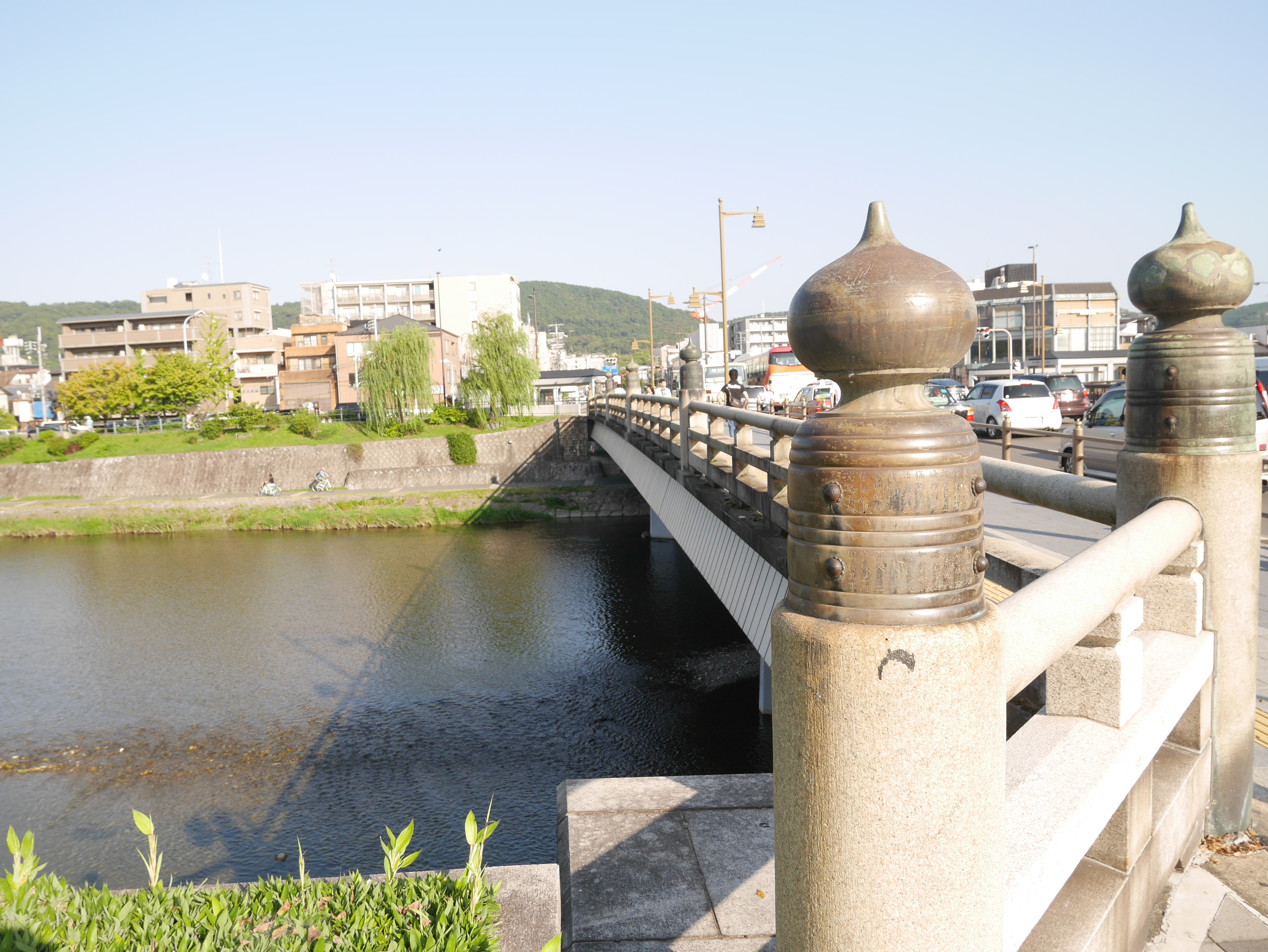
- The bridge in 2014
- Coordinates: 34°59′45″N 135°46′4″E
- Locale: Kyoto, Japan

Gojō Bridge, or Gojō Ōhashi (五条大橋) Bridge, is a bridge in Kyoto, Japan, spanning the Kamo River. The current bridge was built in 1959. The original Gojō Bridge, located to the north, was known as the site of Minamoto no Yoshitsune's encounter and subsequent duel with Benkei. A sculpture near the current Gojō Bridge depicts the meeting.

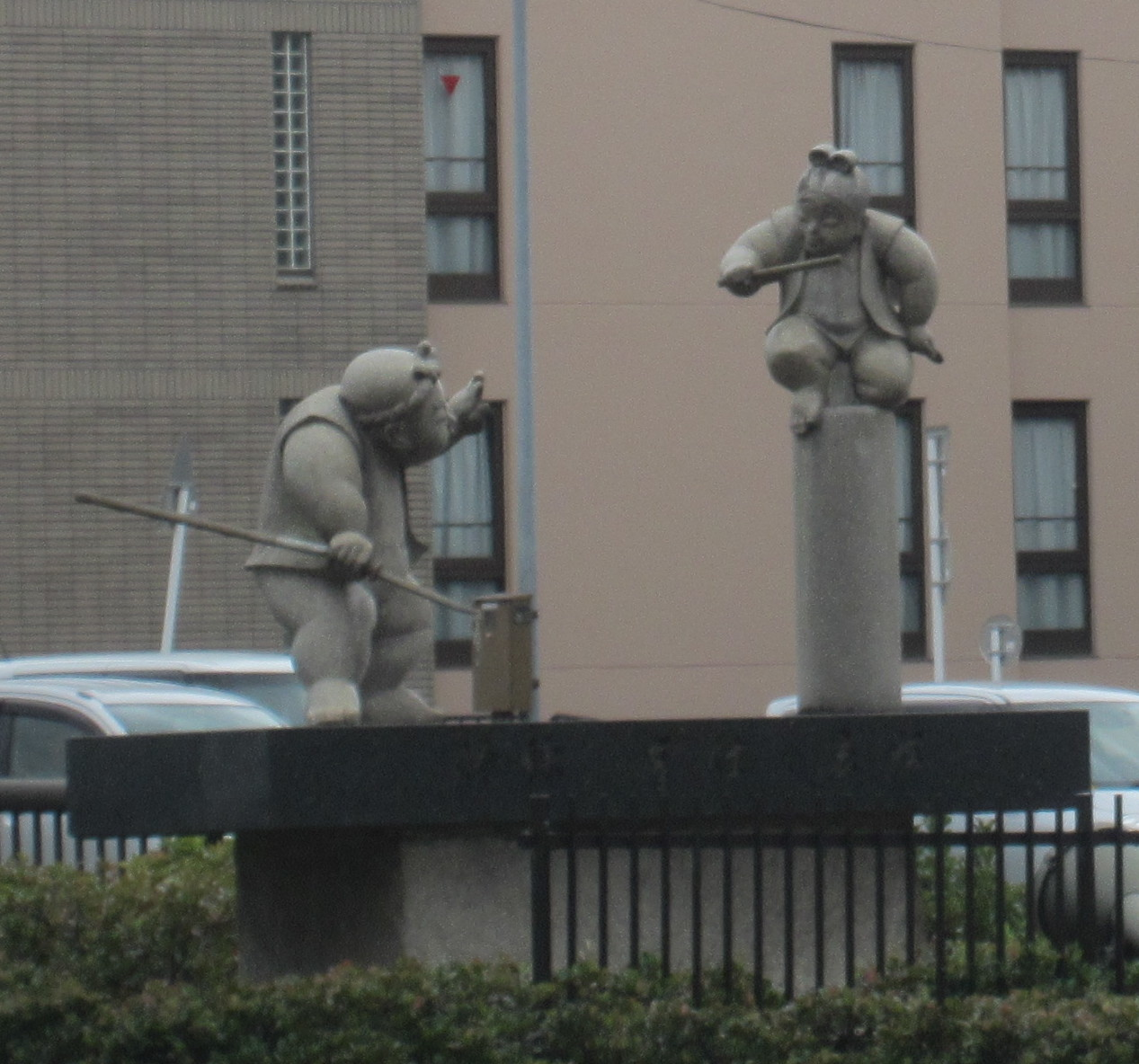
Nearby statues depicting Minamoto no Yoshitsune's encounter with Benkei
