= Yoshitsune Shin Takadachi =

Yoshitsune and the New Takadachi 義経新高館
- Original language: Japanese
- Written by: Ki no Kaion
- Characters: Yoshitsune, Benkei, Shizuka, Yoritomo, Shitennō
- Genre: jidaimono
- Setting: Takadachi fortress, Hiraizumi, Iwate, Japan

Premiere
- Date: 1719
- Place: Japan

Yoshitsune Shin-Takadachi (義経新高館), or Yoshitsune and the New Takadachi, is a Japanese jōruri (puppet) play which centers on the conflict between Minamoto no Yoshitsune and his brother, Shōgun Minamoto no Yoritomo. Though set in the 12th century, and drawing upon previous versions of the story of this conflict, the play alludes strongly to the 1615 siege of Osaka, in which the forces of the Tokugawa shogunate defeated those of the Toyotomi clan.

References to the shogunate, and especially to the campaigns of Tokugawa Ieyasu, were banned from the stage for much of the Edo period (1603-1868) in which the Tokugawa ruled. Yoshitsune Shin-Takadachi, written by Ki no Kaion and first performed in 1719, over a century after the events of the siege of Osaka, is said to have been the first play to successfully allude to these events without being ended by the official censors.

== Background ==
Like many jōruri and kabuki plays, Yoshitsune Shin-Takadachi was not an original narrative, but rather was based on an established series of stories, situations and characters already familiar to the audience, known as a sekai (lit. "world"). It is one of a great many stories and plays centering on the 12th century samurai commander Minamoto no Yoshitsune, younger brother of Shōgun Minamoto no Yoritomo. A conflict arose between the brothers over suspicions that Yoshitsune, who led the Minamoto clan to victory in the Genpei War and thus allowed Yoritomo to gain power and become shōgun, sought to overthrow his brother. The former was forced to flee Kyoto, and sought refuge in the Takadachi fortress in Hiraizumi, far to the north. He was soon attacked there by his brother's shogunal forces, defeated, and forced to commit seppuku.

Allusions are made in the play to the 1615 siege of Osaka, in which Tokugawa Ieyasu led shogunal forces against Toyotomi Hideyori, who had been gathering forces to oppose the shogunate, and who represented the last major opposition to Tokugawa supremacy. Several decades earlier, prior to the end of the 16th century, Ieyasu had been a vassal of Hideyori's father Toyotomi Hideyoshi, and had sworn oaths to serve the Toyotomi and to ensure Hideyori's succession to power. Following Hideyoshi's death in 1598, however, he betrayed his oaths and seized power for himself. The ban on relating these events onstage therefore derived not only from a general aversion to depictions of the honorable, high-class shogunate in the low-class world of the theatres, but also from a fear of the threat posed to the shogunate's power and stability by accusations of Ieyasu's disloyalty and betrayal.

== Characters ==
Strong allusions are made throughout the play to comparisons between the 12th century figures of the tale and those (absent from the play) who took part in the siege of Osaka. Each character is given here with their 17th century counterpart in parentheses.

- Minamoto no Yoritomo (Tokugawa Ieyasu)
- Minamoto no Yoshitsune (Toyotomi Hideyori)
- Gonnotō Kanefusa (Katagiri Katsumoto)
- Izumi no Saburō (Sanada Yukimura)
- Kamei no Rokurō (Kimura Shigenari)
- Kataoka no Hachirō (Gotō Mototsugu)
- Kyō no Kimi/Shizuka Gozen (Yodo-Dono)

== Summary ==
The plot of the play, while making reference to the actual 12th century historical events, and to a number of other narratives in the Yoshitsune sekai, also parallels in many ways aspects of the historical events of the siege of Osaka.

After arriving at Takadachi, Yoshitsune sends three messengers to his brother, to seek reconciliation. These parallel the three envoys sent to Ieyasu from Osaka in 1614. Yoshitsune's envoys explain that he and his followers are guilty of three crimes, and wish to seek forgiveness.

The first crime refers to an event in which Yoshitsune and his loyal retainer, the monk Benkei, disguise themselves as monks gathering alms for the rebuilding of the Tōdai-ji, destroyed in the 1180 siege of Nara, in order to sneak past the guard barrier at Ataka. To prove their identities as monks, the pair are asked to show a subscription list of those who have already donated. Benkei's improvisation of a false list is claimed as the second crime. This event is also depicted in the Noh play Ataka, and the later kabuki play Kanjinchō.

Benkei's reading of the blank scroll includes the phrase "We request the help of many people to bring virtue to our country's court," a reference to the army Yoshitsune seeks to raise against his brother, and also in parallel to the forces gathered by Hideyori against the Tokugawa. The inclusion of the characters yori (頼, "request") and tomo (朝, "court"), that is, the characters of the shōgun's name, Yoritomo, in this phrase also alludes to an incident between Hideyori and Ieyasu. Hideyori commissioned the casting of a temple bell for the Hōkō-ji which included the characters Ie and yasu, split apart, in its inscription in a phrase which was said by the shogunate to have been treasonous. The third crime cited by the messengers is related: that of seeking to gather an army against the shogunate.

Yoritomo offers to reconcile with his brother if Yoshitsune fulfills one of three conditions; these conditions closely parallel those offered by Ieyasu to Hideyori. The first is that Yoshitsune (Hideyori) abandon his fortress to become lord of the western provinces. The second is that he submit to the shogunate as the other lords have done. The third is that Yoshitsune send his mistress to the capitol as a hostage. In the original play, this was Kyō no Kimi, though other versions name Shizuka Gozen as the potential hostage; Hideyori was asked to surrender his mother, Lady Yodo.

In the end, Yoritomo's shogunal army attacks Yoshitsune's fortress at Takadachi, paralleling the siege of Osaka by diverting the nearby Koromo River to flood the fortifications, and by inclusion of a temporary truce in the middle of the fighting. At Osaka, the Yodo River was diverted, and a significant break occurred in the fighting between winter and summer.

== Success and spin-offs ==
Kaion's production was successfully performed without incident in 1719. In addition to employing the device known as mitate, of substituting earlier figures and events for later ones, Kaion ensured that the play would be satisfactory to the censors by portraying Yoritomo, who represents Ieyasu, in a positive light. While Yoshitsune is indecisive, and his men disunited, Yoritomo is portrayed as a military genius, dedicated and noble.

The play was reworked and reproduced under a number of different titles over the ensuing decades, to varying levels of success. Nanbantetsu Gotō Menuki, which changed the sekai of the play from that of Yoshitsune to that of the 14th century Taiheiki (Nanboku-chō Wars), was written in 1735, but was never allowed to be published or performed. This was due in part to a scene in which an assassination attempt is made upon Ashikaga Takauji, who represents Ieyasu. Yoshitsune Shin-fukumi-jō (Yoshitsune's New Veiled Letter), created in 1744, was based very much on the original, but ended in a reconciliation between the brothers, dropping the siege scenes. Yoshitsune Koshigoe-jō (Yoshitsune's Letter from Koshigoe), was produced ten years later in 1754, and incorporated elements of Nanbantetsu, including the assassination scene of Act IV. This act was forbidden to be performed, and was not seen until 1770; the play was published in its entirely shortly afterwards, implying that it was also performed in its entirely on at least a few occasions.
