= Battle of Koromo River =

1189 battle in Japan

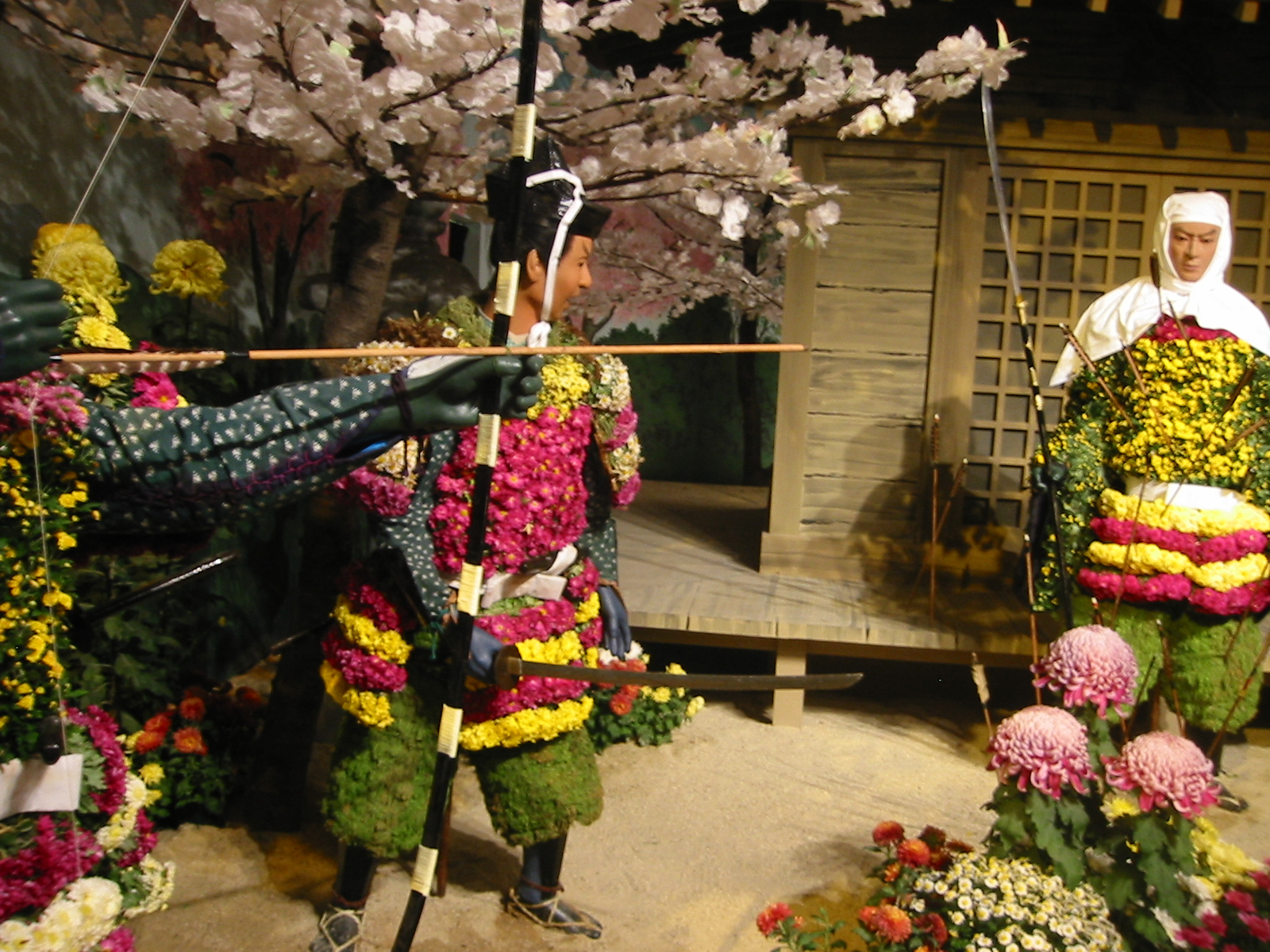
- The 8th scene of "Yoshitsune": Benkei dies standing upright (Hirakata Daikiku Ningyo, 2005)
Date	June 15, 1189
Location	Hiraizumi, Mutsu Province
Result	Fujiwara no Yasuhira victory

Belligerents
Fujiwara no Yasuhira	Minamoto no Yoshitsune

Commanders and leaders
Fujiwara no Yasuhira	Minamoto no Yoshitsune ‡‡

Strength
500	20–90

Casualties and losses
Unknown, ~300	Unknown, all forces presumed lost.

The Battle of Koromo River took place during the opening years of the Kamakura period (12th century) of Japan.

After the destruction of the Heike, Minamoto no Yoshitsune conflicted with his brother Minamoto no Yoritomo, and fled into Hiraizumi, Mutsu Province. He was sheltered by Northern Fujiwara's 3rd ruler Fujiwara no Hidehira. Hidehira appointed Yoshitsune as general to be opposed to Yoritomo, but he died of illness on October 29, 1187.

Yoritomo strongly pressured Fujiwara no Yasuhira, the 2nd son and successor of Hidehira, through the Imperial Court to arrest Yoshitsune. Against the will of his father, Yasuhira succumbed to the repeated pressure of Yoritomo. On June 15, 1189, he led 500 soldiers to attack Yoshitsune and an entourage of servants in the Koromogawa no tachi residence. Yasuhira defeated Yoshitsune and his compatriot, Saitō no Musashibō Benkei. Throughout the battle, Benkei defended his lord. Benkei supposedly died standing up, which caused great fear in his enemies. Yoshitsune himself committed seppuku at the end of the battle.
