= Motohira =

- Gender: Male

Origin
- Origin: Japanese
- Meaning: Different meanings depending on the kanji used

Motohira (written: 基衡 or 基平) is a masculine Japanese given name. Notable people with the name include:

- Fujiwara no Motohira (藤原 基衡; 1105–1157), ruler of Northern Fujiwara in Mutsu Province, Japan
- Konoe Motohira (近衛 基平; 1246–1268), Japanese kugyō
