= Yōkyoku =

Vocal section of traditional Japanese Noh theatre

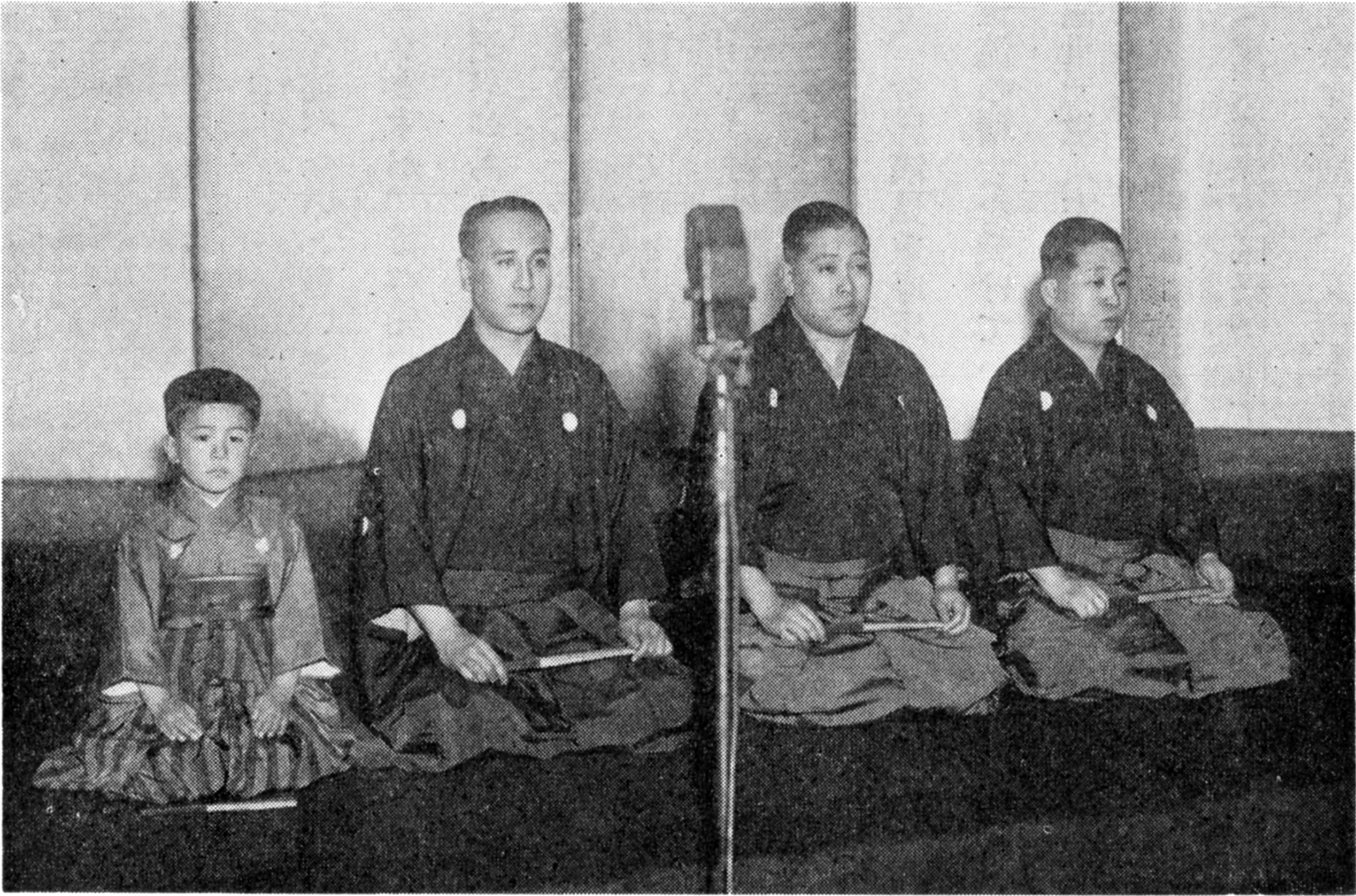
A radio broadcast of Yōkyoku, 1930s

Yōkyoku (謡曲), also called utai (謡), is a part of the traditional Noh theatre in Japan.

The name refers to the vocal section of the music associated with classical Noh drama. Yōkyoku is sung by the chorus and rarely by the other actors. It usually consists of references to classical texts or Buddhist sutras and are composed in groups of five and seven syllables.

These vocalizations, as well as the performance of accompanying instruments, help to produce a multitude of supernatural and celestial sounds that are intrinsic to the Noh music genre.

It has two basic styles:

- Kotoba: words/heightened speech
- Fushi: melody
