= Minamoto no Yoshitsune =

12th-century Japanese samurai

Minamoto Yoshitsune
- 源 義経
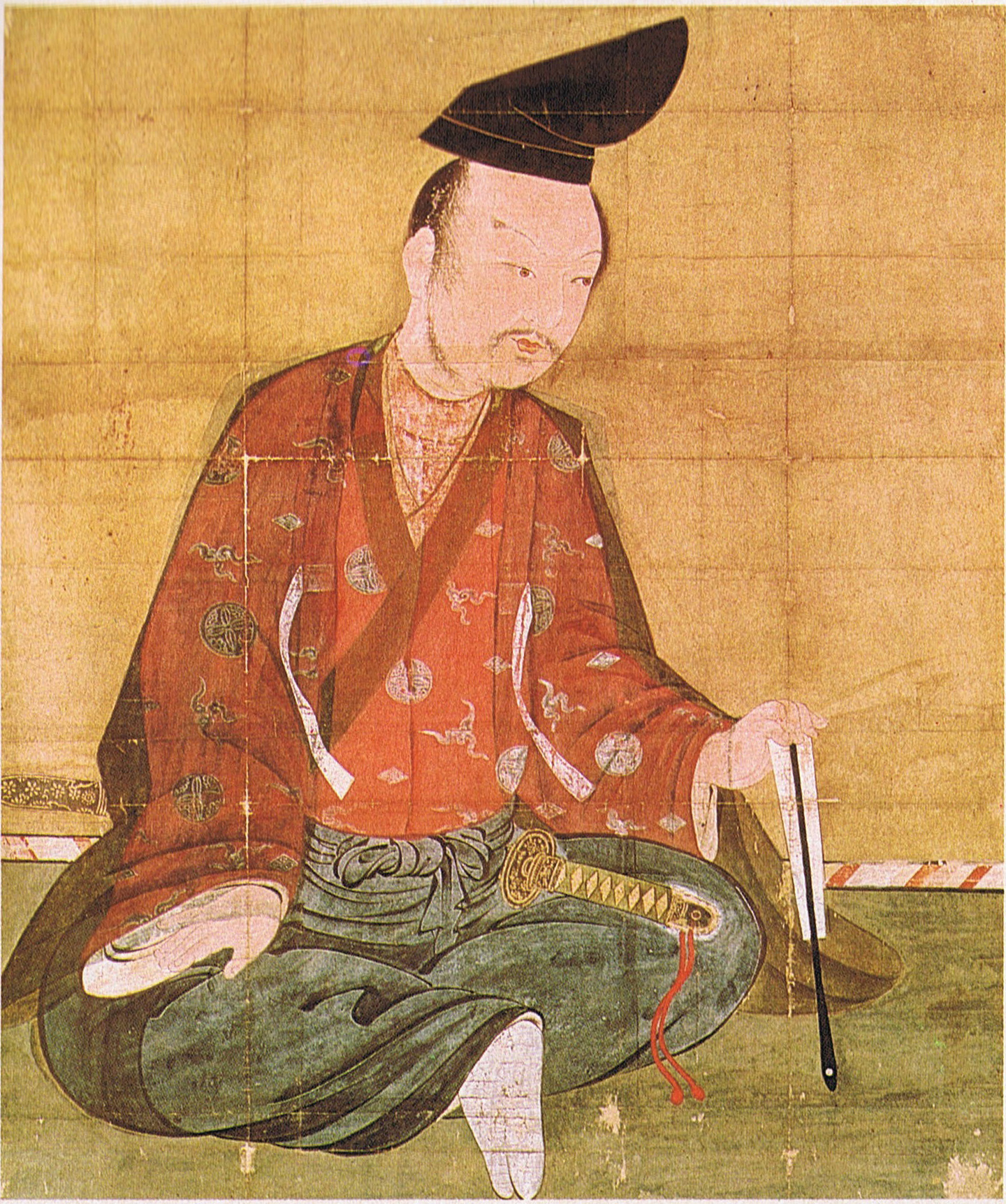
- Portrait of Yoshitsune in the Chusonji collection
- Born: Ushiwakamaru (牛若丸) c. 1159; Heian-kyō, Heian Japan
- Died: June 15, 1189 (aged 30); Battle of Koromo River; Hiraizumi, Kamakura shogunate
- Spouse: Satō Gozen
- Relatives: Shizuka Gozen (concubine); Minamoto no Yoshitomo (father); Tokiwa Gozen (mother); Minamoto no Yoritomo (half-brother); Minamoto no Noriyori (half-brother)
- Military career
- Family: Minamoto
- Conflicts: Battle of Uji (1184); Battle of Awazu (1184); Battle of Ichi-no-Tani (1184); Battle of Yashima (1185); Battle of Dan-no-ura (1185); Battle of Koromo River (1189)

Signature
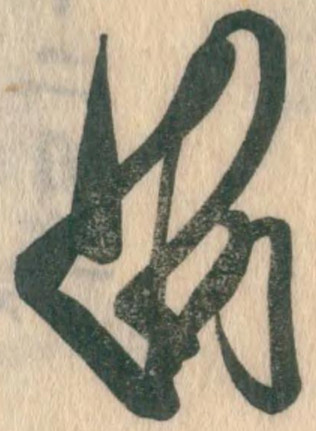

Minamoto no Yoshitsune (源 義経; Japanese pronunciation: [mʲì.nä́.mó̞.tó̞ nó̞ | jò̞.ɕi̥.t͡sɨ́.nè̞, -t͡sɨ̀.nè̞, -nó̞ jó̞-]; c. 1159 – June 15, 1189) was a Japanese samurai commander of the Minamoto clan of Japan in the late Heian and early Kamakura periods. His older half-brother was Minamoto no Yoritomo, the first shogun of the Kamakura shogunate. His common name was Kurō (九郎; lit. 'ninth son'), and his formal name was Yoshitsune.

Born as the ninth son of Minamoto no Yoshitomo of the Kawachi Genji clan, his childhood name was Ushiwakamaru. Due to his father's defeat and death in the Heiji Rebellion, he was entrusted to Kurama-dera temple. He later traveled down to Hiraizumi, where he received the protection of Fujiwara no Hidehira, the head of the Ōshū Fujiwara clan. When his half-brother Yoritomo raised an army to overthrow the Taira clan (the Jishō-Juei War), Yoshitsune rushed to join him. He became the greatest contributor to the Minamoto victory, destroying the Taira clan through the battles of Ichi-no-Tani, Yashima, and Dan-no-ura. Although Yoritomo and Yoshitsune initially had a close relationship, described as being like "father and son", Yoshitsune incurred Yoritomo's wrath by accepting court titles without permission and acting independently during the war against the Taira.

When Yoshitsune showed signs of seeking his own independence in response, he came into conflict with Yoritomo and was declared an enemy of the court. After an order for his capture was issued nationwide, he fled and once again sought refuge with Fujiwara no Hidehira. However, after Hidehira's death, Hidehira's successor, Fujiwara no Yasuhira, under pressure from Yoritomo, attacked Yoshitsune. He was forced to commit suicide at the Koromogawa-no-tachi mansion in what is now Hiraizumi, Iwate Prefecture.

He is considered one of the greatest and the most popular warriors of his era, and one of the most famous samurai in the history of Japan. Later labelled as a tragic hero, his dramatic end drew great sympathy from the public, giving rise to the term hōganbiiki (sympathy for the underdog, from one of Yoshitsune's titles, Hōgan), as well as numerous legends and stories.

== Early life ==
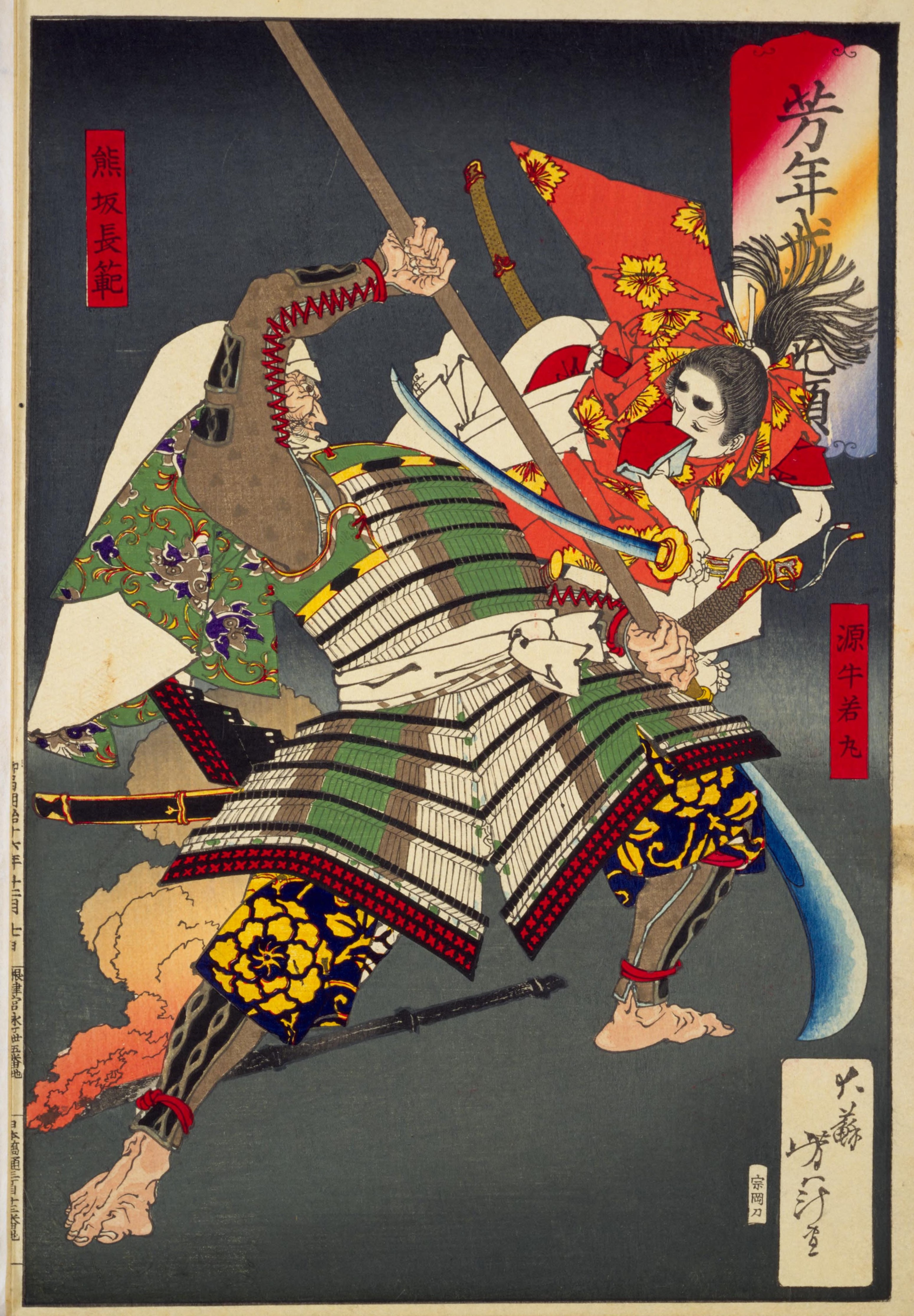
The fight between Ushiwakamaru and the bandit chief Kumasaka Chohan in 1174. Yoshitsune was only 15 when he defeated the notorious bandit leader. Ukiyo-e printed by Tsukioka Yoshitoshi. Warriors Trembling with Courage .

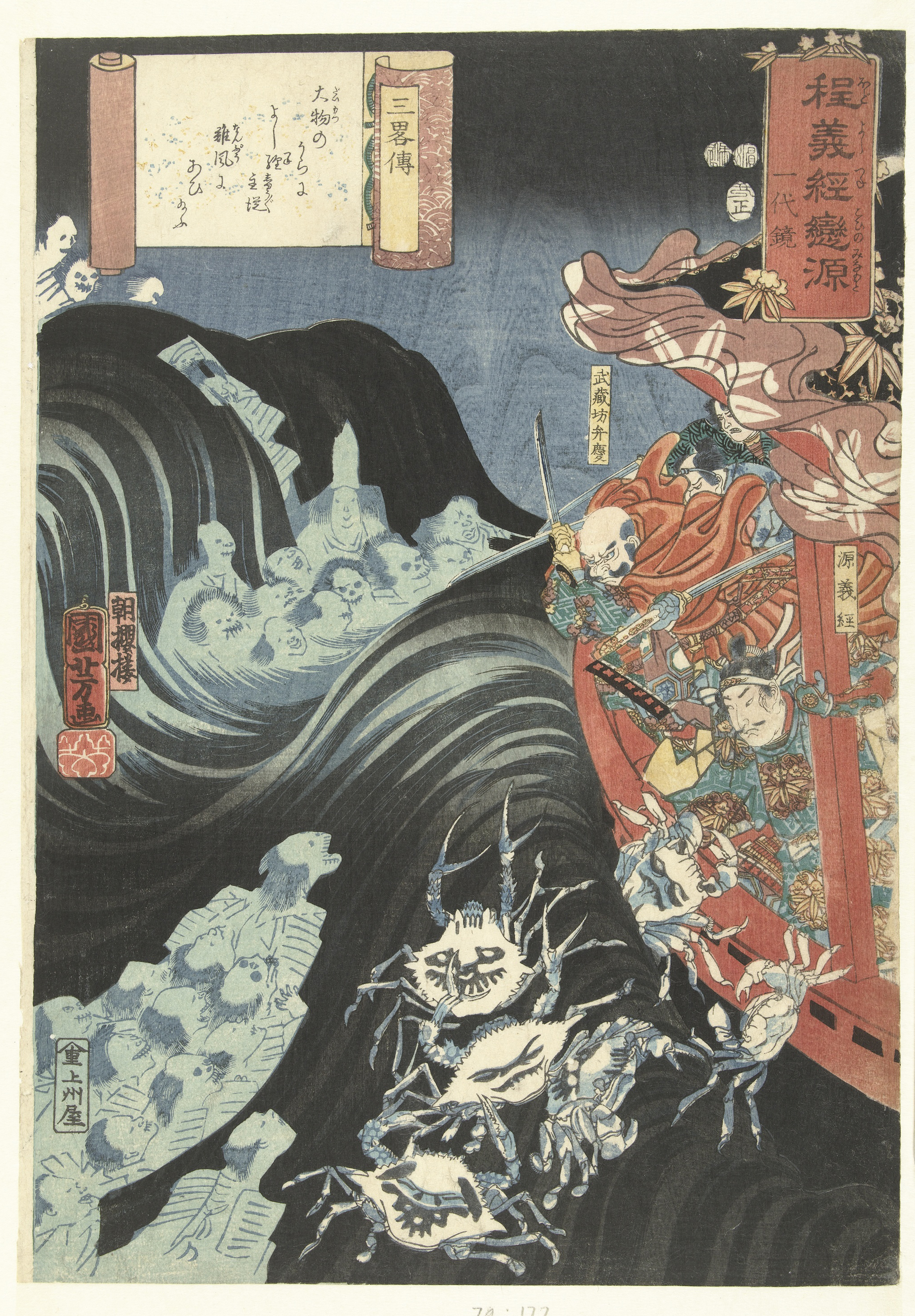
Yoshitsune and Benkei defending themselves in their boat during a storm created by the ghosts of conquered Taira warriors. Made by Utagawa Kuniyoshi

Yoshitsune was the ninth son of Minamoto no Yoshitomo, and the third and final son and child that Yoshitomo would father with Tokiwa Gozen. Yoshitsune's older half-brother Minamoto no Yoritomo (the third son of Yoshitomo) would go on to establish the Kamakura shogunate. Yoshitsune's name in childhood was Ushiwakamaru (牛若丸; Japanese pronunciation: [ɯ.ɕi.wa.kaꜜ.ma.ɾɯ]) or young bull (牛若丸). He was born just before the Heiji Rebellion in 1160 in which his father and two oldest brothers were killed. He survived this incident by fleeing the capital with his mother, while his half-brother Yoritomo was banished to Izu Province. When he was 10, Yoshitsune was placed in the care of the monks of Kurama temple (鞍馬寺), nestled in the Hiei Mountains near the capital of Kyoto. There, he was taught swordsmanship and strategy, according to some legends by Sōjōbō, to others by Kiichi Hōgen (whose book, Six Secret Teachings, Ushiwakamaru stole). His clerical name while in the temple was Shanao (遮那王) or Shana king. Not wanting to become a monk, Yoshitsune eventually left and followed a gold merchant who knew his father well, and in 1174 relocated to Hiraizumi, Mutsu Province, where he was put under the protection of Fujiwara no Hidehira, head of the powerful regional Northern Fujiwara clan.

== Career ==
A skillful swordsman, Yoshitsune defeated the legendary warrior monk Benkei in a duel. From then on, Benkei became Yoshitsune's retainer, eventually dying with him at the Battle of Koromo River.

In 1180, Yoshitsune heard that Yoritomo, now head of the Minamoto clan, had raised an army at the request of Prince Mochihito to fight against the Taira clan (also known as the Heike), which had usurped the power of the emperor. In the ensuing war between the rival Minamoto and Taira samurai clans, which is known as the Genpei War, Yoshitsune joined Yoritomo, along with Minamoto no Noriyori, all brothers who had not previously met.

Yoshitsune, together with his brother Noriyori, defeated the Taira in several key battles. He also attacked and killed his cousin Minamoto no Yoshinaka, a rival for control of the Minamoto clan, at the Battle of Awazu in Ōmi Province in early 1184 on the orders of Yoritomo.

Yoshitsune, who had by then been given the rank of general, went on to defeat the Taira at the Battle of Ichi-no-Tani in what is now Kobe in March 1184, and again at the Battle of Yashima in Shikoku in March 1185. He finally destroyed them one month later at the Battle of Dan-no-ura in present-day Yamaguchi Prefecture.

Yoshitsune was then given Ōmi Province for him to govern, after the Battle of Awazu.

== Final years ==
Following the Genpei War, Yoshitsune was appointed as Governor of Iyo and awarded other titles by cloistered emperor Go-Shirakawa. His suspicious brother Yoritomo, however, opposed the presentation of these titles, and nullified them.

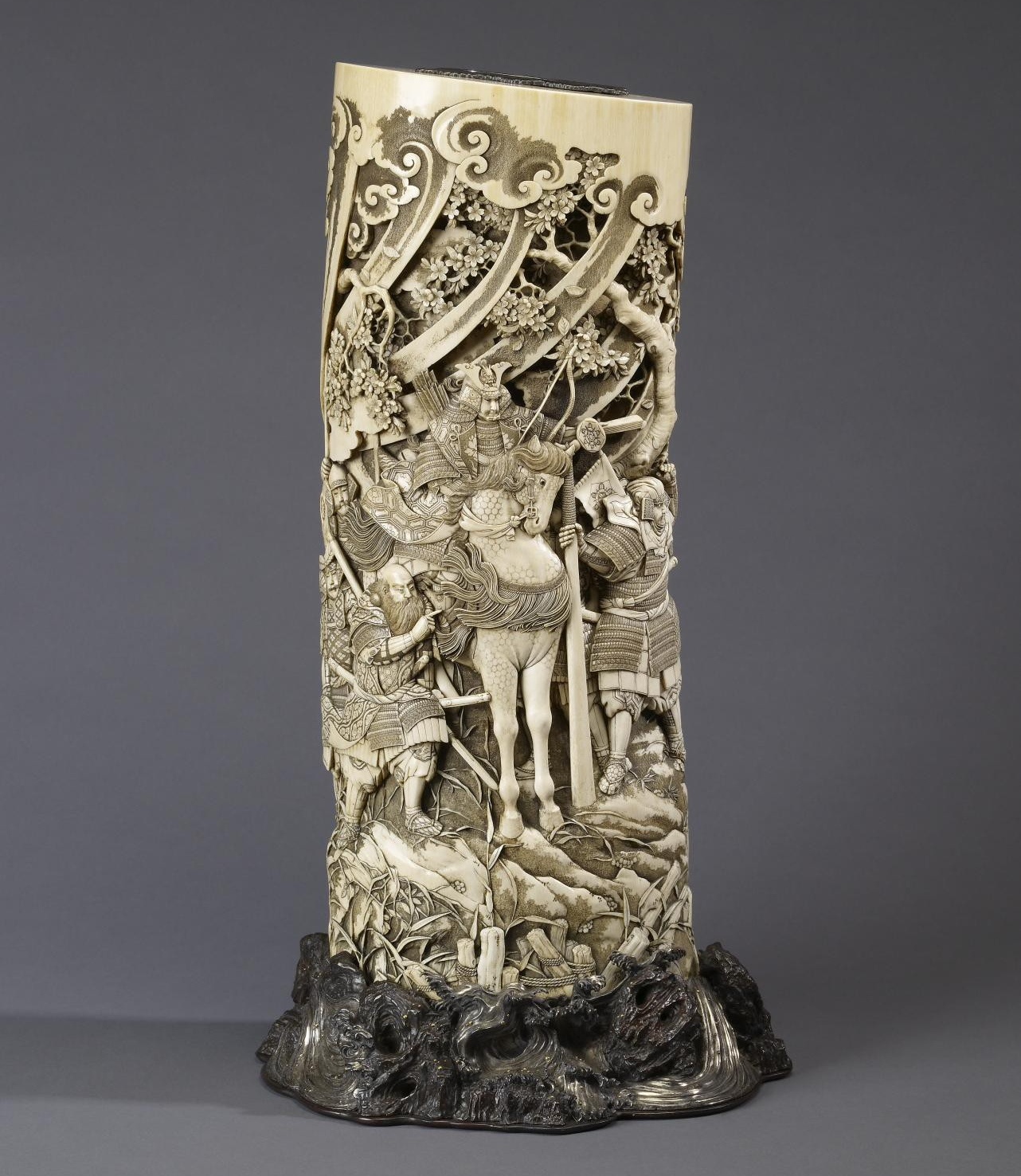
An ivory carving depicting Yoshitsune and his retainers looking at the rough sea while fleeing from Yoritomo's pursuers, by Ishikawa Komei, circa 1880. Walters Art Museum

Yoshitsune then secured imperial authorization to ally with his uncle Minamoto no Yukiie in opposing Yoritomo. Incurring Yoritomo's wrath, Yoshitsune fled Kyoto in 1185. His faithful mistress, Shizuka Gozen, carrying his unborn child, fled with him at first, but then was left behind, and soon taken into custody by forces loyal to Yoritomo.

Yoshitsune eventually made his way to Hiraizumi, Mutsu, once again to the protection of Fujiwara no Hidehira, and lived undisturbed for a time. Hidehira's son Fujiwara no Yasuhira had promised upon Hidehira's death to honor his father's wishes and continue to shelter Yoshitsune, but, giving in to pressure from Yoritomo, betrayed Yoshitsune, surrounding his Koromogawa-no-tachi residence with his troops, defeating Yoshitsune's retainers, including Benkei (in a famous "standing death"), and forcing Yoshitsune to commit seppuku. Yasuhira then had Yoshitsune's head preserved in sake, placed in a black-lacquered chest, and sent to Yoritomo as proof of his death. Historical sources differ as to the fate of Yoshitsune's mistress Shizuka and their son.

Yoshitsune is enshrined in the Shirahata Jinja, a Shinto shrine in the city of Fujisawa.

== Rumors and legend ==
The death of Yoshitsune has been very elusive. According to some Ainu accounts, he did not perform seppuku, but instead escaped the siege at Koromogawa, fleeing to Hokkaido, where he is sometimes identified with the theonyms Okikurumi and Oinakamui. An alternative legend states that after evading death, Yoshitsune made his way past Hokkaido and sailed to the mainland of Asia, re-surfacing as Genghis Khan. This story was popularized by Suematsu Kenchō (1855–1920) while he was studying at Cambridge University in 1879, with the aim of improving Japanese prestige in the wake of the Meiji Restoration. This theory was popular in Japan from the late 19th to the early 20th century. It is believed that the theory was convenient for Japan at the time, which was promoting "enriching the country, strengthening the military" as its national slogan. After World War II ended in 1945, the theory's popularity waned due to the belief that it was disrespectful to the Mongolian people.

According to the tradition of the Henshoji temple in Mooka, Tochigi, and as printed in their magazine, Hitachibō Kaison entrusted a monk Hitachi Nyūdō Nensai with a child of Minamoto no Yoshitsune, Keiwaka, as demanded by Fujiwara Hidehira. Furthermore, according to the tradition of Enmyō-ji temple in Hirosaki, Aomori, Chitose Maru, also known as Keiwakamaru, was a child of Yoshitsune, entrusted to Date Tomomune by Kaison. Kaison disappeared after the adoption.

== Koshigoe Letter ==
The "Koshigoe Letter" was written by Yoshitsune on the 24th day of the 5th month of the second year of Genryaku (June 23, 1185) as he waited in Koshigoe for approval from Yoritomo to enter Kamakura. The letter was Yoshitsune's "final appeal" to Yoritomo of his loyalty. The letter is a "mixture of bravado and an almost masochistic indulgence in misfortune." An excerpt:

So here I remain, vainly shedding crimson tears....I have not been permitted to refute the accusations of my slanderers or [even] to set foot in Kamakura, but have been obliged to languish idly these many days with no possibility of declaring the sincerity of my intentions. It is now so long since I have set eyes on His Lordship's compassionate countenance that the bond of our blood brotherhood seems to have vanished.

== In literature ==
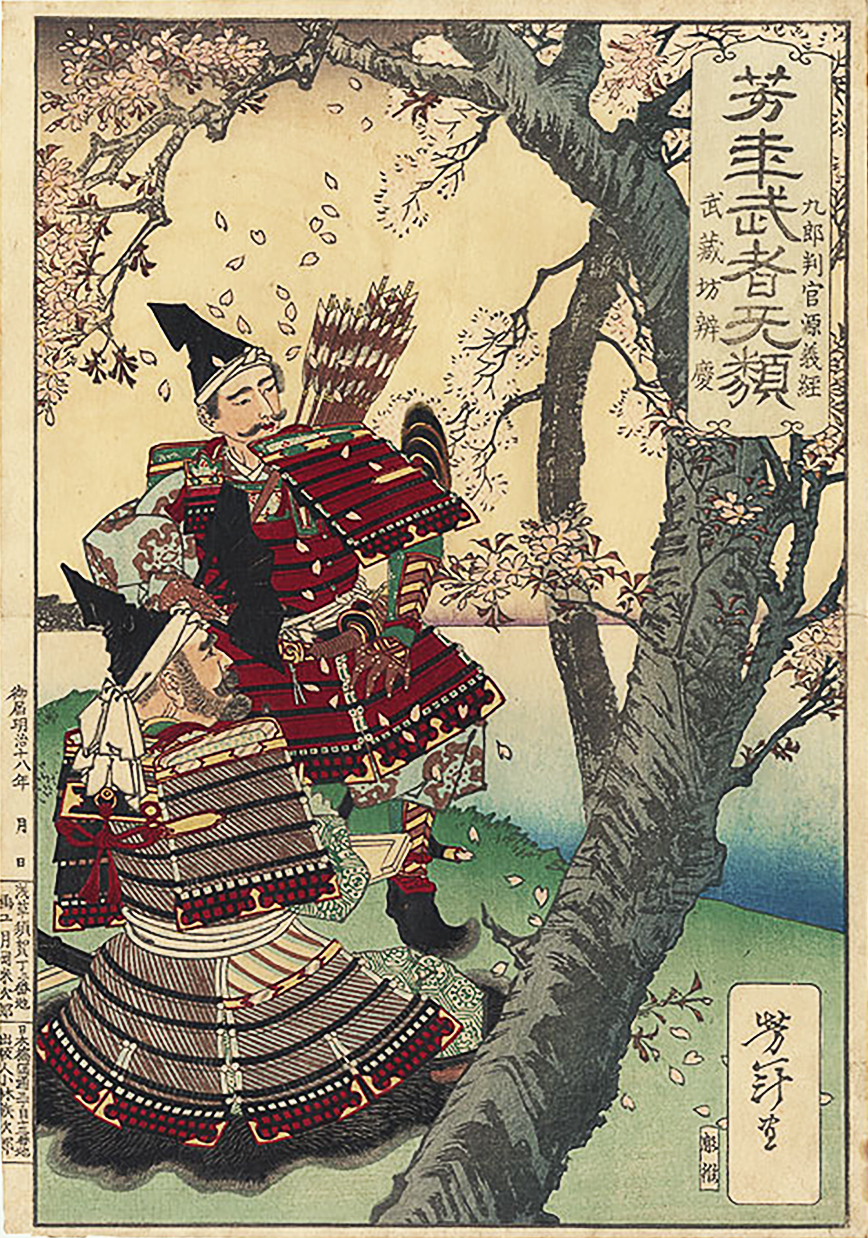
Yoshitsune and Benkei Viewing Cherry Blossom, by Yoshitoshi Tsukioka

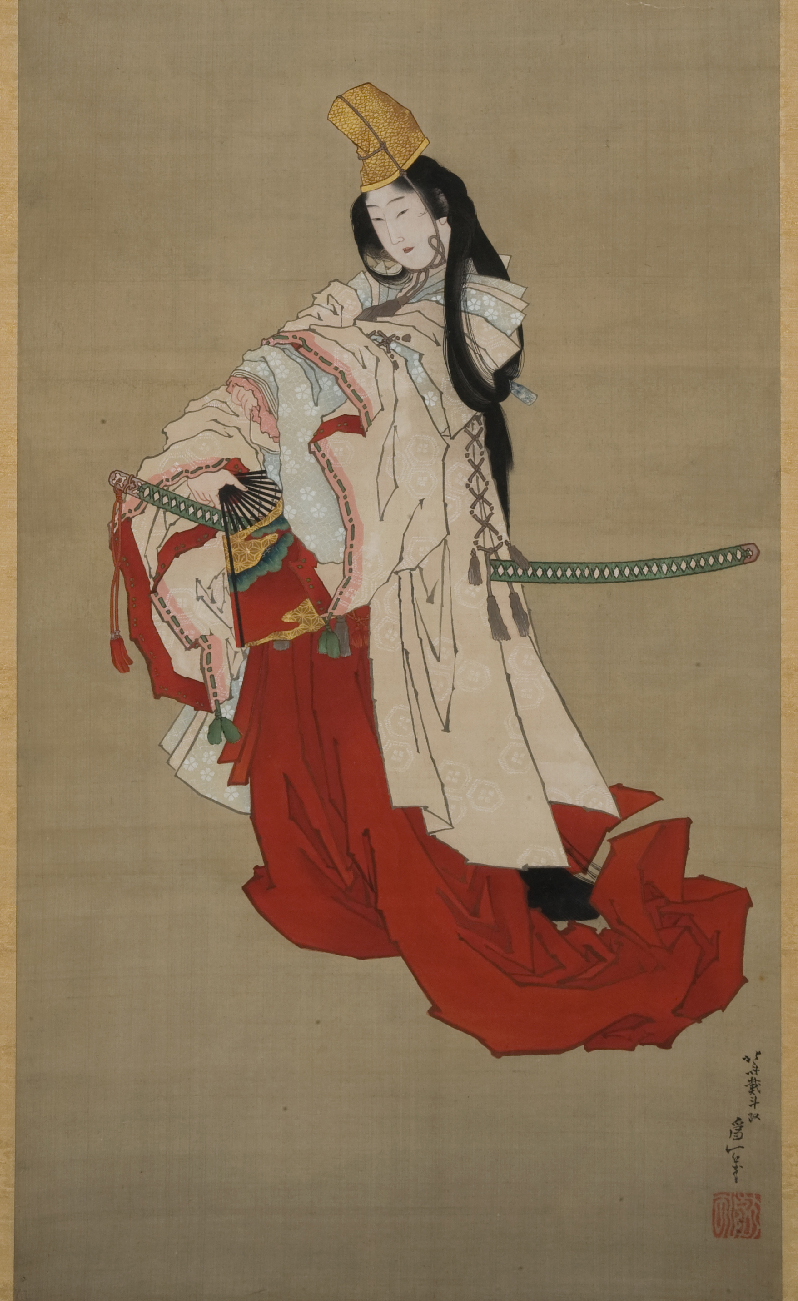
Painting of Shizuka Gozen (lady Shizuka) by Katsushika Hokusai of the most famous shirabyōshi

Yoshitsune has long been a popular figure in Japanese literature and culture due to his appearance as the main character in the third section of the Japanese literary classic Heike Monogatari (Tale of the Heike). The Japanese term for "sympathy for a tragic hero", Hōgan-biiki (判官贔屓, lit. Hōgan favor), comes from Yoshitsune's title Kurō Hōgan (九郎判官), which he received from the Imperial Court.

Many of the literary pieces that Yoshitsune appears in are legend rather than historical fact. Legends pertaining to Yoshitsune first began to appear in the fourteenth century. In early works at that time, Yoshitsune was described as a sharp-witted military leader. Then, romantic stories about his early childhood and last years of his life appeared as people began to know more about him.

The legends that deal with his public career show Yoshitsune as a great, virtuous warrior. He was often shown as kind to those around him and honorable, but was also shown to be naive.

Legends dealing with Yoshitsune's childhood show young Yoshitsune (or Ushiwakamaru) with heroic qualities. He is portrayed as a brave and skilled swordsman, despite being a young boy. He was also skilled in music and his studies, and was also said to be able to easily sway the hearts of young women. These legends delve into fantasy more so than the legends about his later life.

Legends which pertain to the time when his half-brother, Yoritomo, turned against him take away some of Yoshitsune's heroic qualities. He is no longer portrayed as a great warrior, but he retains his knowledge and skills that are valuable in the emperor's court.

Yoshitsune's escape through the Ataka barrier is the subject of Noh play Ataka and the Kabuki play Kanjinchō. Kanjinchō was later dramatized by Akira Kurosawa in the 1945 movie The Men Who Tread on the Tiger's Tail.

The Gikeiki, or "Chronicle of Yoshitsune" relates events of Yoshitsune's life after the defeat of the Heike.

== Family ==
- Father: Minamoto no Yoshitomo
- Mother: Tokiwa Gozen
- Wife: Satō Gozen (1168–1189), daughter of Kawagoe Shigeyori.
- Concubine: Shizuka Gozen

== Traditional arts ==
In addition to The Tale of the Heike and Gikeiki, a great many other works of literature and drama feature him, and together form the sekai ("world") of Yoshitsune, a concept akin to the notion of the literary cycle.

These include:

- Yoshitsune Shin Takadachi (jōruri)
- Yoshitsune Senbon Zakura (jōruri and kabuki)
- Kanjinchō (kabuki)

In the visual arts, Yoshitsune is commonly depicted as a bishōnen, though this is at odds with contemporary descriptions of his appearance.

== See also ==
- Kurama-tengu
- Kurozuka (novel)
- Mysteries of Yoshitsune I&II
- Seiwa Genji
