= Northern Fujiwara =

Japanese noble family that ruled the Tōhoku region of Japan during the 12th century

Northern Fujiwara 奥州藤原氏
- Home province: Tōhoku region
- Parent house: Fujiwara clan
- Founder: Fujiwara no Kiyohira (清衡)
- Final ruler: Fujiwara no Yasuhira (泰衡)
- Founding year: 1087
- Dissolution: 1189

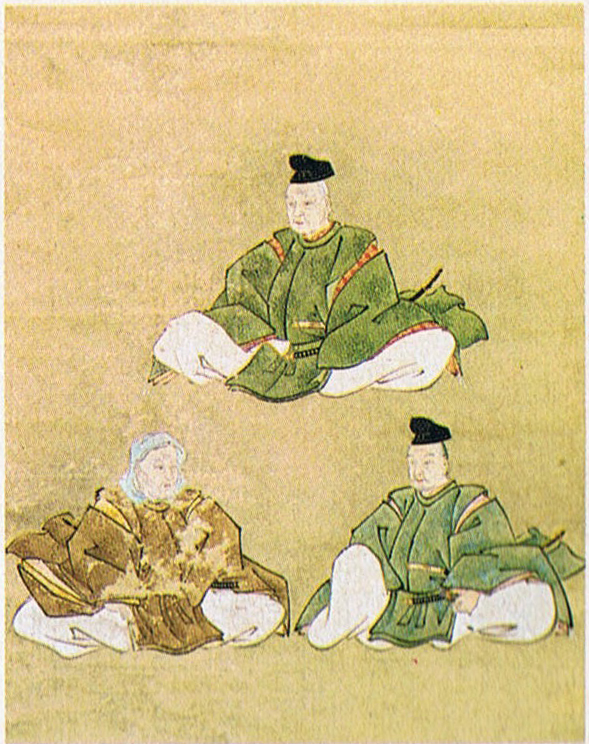
The Mōtsū-ji portrait of Oshu-Fujiwara clan heads: clockwise, Kiyohira, Motohira and Hidehira.

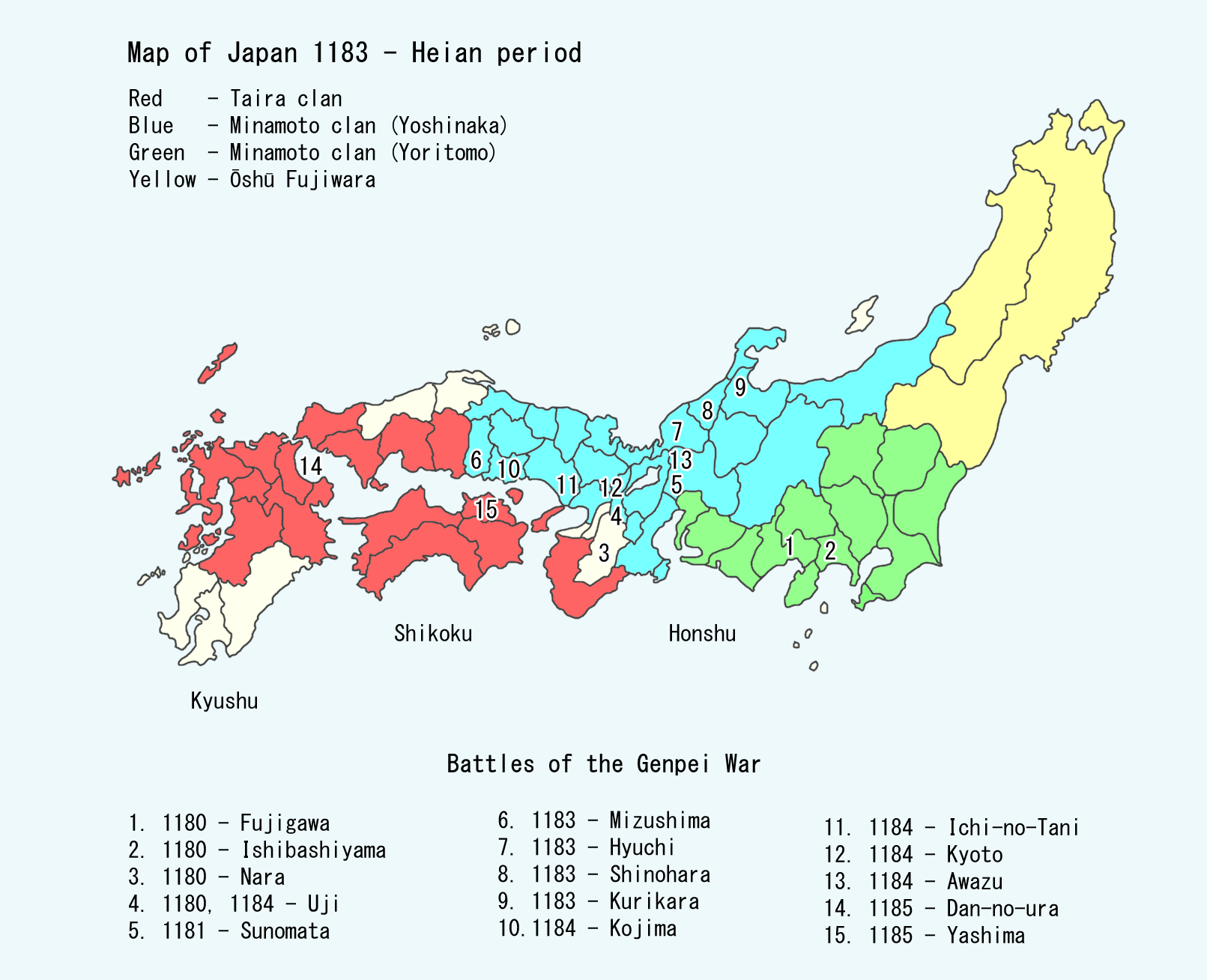
The domain of the Oshu-Fujiwara clan and other military lords in Japan (1183)

The Northern Fujiwara (Japanese: 奥州藤原氏, Hepburn: Ōshū Fujiwara-shi) were a Japanese noble family that ruled the Tōhoku region (the northeast of Honshū, also known as Ōshū) of Japan during the 12th century, 1094–1104, as their own realm.

They succeeded the semi-independent Emishi families of the 11th century, who were gradually brought down by the Minamoto clan loyal to the Imperial Court in Kyoto. They ruled over an independent region that derived its wealth from gold mining, horse trading, and serving as middlemen in the trade in luxury items from continental Asia and from the far northern Emishi. They were able to keep their independence vis-à-vis Kyoto by the strength of their warrior bands until they were ultimately conquered by the Kantō samurai clans led by Minamoto no Yoritomo, in the Battle of Ōshū in 1189.

The Northern Fujiwara clan was responsible for the construction and patronage of the historic sites of Hiraizumi, their seat of power, now designated as UNESCO World Heritage Sites.

== Origins ==
Historically, it was believed that the Northern Fujiwara were of mixed Japanese–Emishi descent. Fujiwara no Kiyohira is said to have had a Japanese father, Fujiwara no Tsunekiyo, and an Emishi mother, a daughter of Abe no Yoritoki . Later genealogical records, such as the 14th century Sonpi Bunmyaku, trace Kiyohira's paternal lineage to Fujiwara no Hidesato.

After his father's death, Kiyohira was raised as a member of the Kiyohara clan, as his mother remarried into a Kiyohara family in Dewa Province. However, Kiyohira, with the aid of Minamoto no Yoshiie, became independent in 1087, after winning the Gosannen War, and they established themselves in Hiraizumi (in present-day Iwate Prefecture).

== History ==
After its foundation by Fujiwara no Kiyohira in 1087, the Northern Fujiwara clan ruled the Mutsu and Dewa Province for over a century.

Along with Kiyohira, the next two generations of Fujiwara no Motohira and Hidehira saw the zenith of Northern Fujiwara's power in the Tōhoku region. At the zenith of their rule, they attracted artisans from the imperial capital Heian and greatly expanded their seat of power, Hiraizumi. They introduced the high culture of Heian into the region and built many temples, such as the Chūson-ji founded in 1095.

During the Genpei War (1180–1185), fought between the Minamoto clan and the Taira clan, the Northern Fujiwara remained neutral.

A conflict erupted between lord Minamoto no Yoritomo, the victor of the Genpei War, and the Northern Fujiwara clan over the extradition of Minamoto no Yoshitsune, younger brother and former general of Yoritomo, who had fled to Hiraizumi. Hidehira had remained neutral during the Genpei War, but when Yoshitsune took refuge in Hiraizumi, he decided to protect him.

Hidehira, who had protected Yoshitsune, soon died and his son Fujiwara no Yasuhira succeeded his father as the 4th head of the Northern Fujiwara clan. Yasuhira acceded Minamoto no Yoritomo's will, and had Yoshitsune assassinated. After Yoshitsune was assassinated in April 1189, his severed head was delivered to Kamakura by July for Yoritomo to see. However, Yoritomo was already set on conquering Hiraizumi and this did nothing to repair their damaged relations.

On September 1, 1189, 284,000 cavalrymen led by Yoritomo set out to attack Hiraizumi. Yasuhira prepared himself an army of 170,000 cavalrymen to defend his realm. Thus, the Battle of Ōshū began.

Yasuhira's forces were defeated one after another, and on October 2, he fled Hiraizumi leaving it afire. Yoritomo entered Hiraizumi the next day. Yasuhira was found and killed in Nienosaku, Hinai, Mutsu Province (present-day Ōdate, Akita Prefecture) on October 14.

The Battle of Ōshū resulted in the destruction of the Northern Fujiwara clan. This marked the end of the tumultuous period of civil war that began in 1180, and the completion of Yoritomo's nationwide domination and the establishment of the Kamakura shogunate.

== Notable members ==
Below is a family tree of the Fujiwaras who show up most frequently in historical accounts.

Tsunekiyo (経清)
Kiyohira (清衡)
Koretsune (惟常)	Motohira (基衡)
Hidehira (秀衡)
Kunihira (国衡)	Yasuhira (泰衡)	Tadahira* (忠衡)	Takahira (高衡)

*a.k.a. Izumi (no) Saburo

(Adopted kin are not shown.)

== See also ==
- Fujiwara clan
- Hokke (Fujiwara)
