= Fujiwara no Hidehira =

Third ruler of Northern Fujiwara, Japan

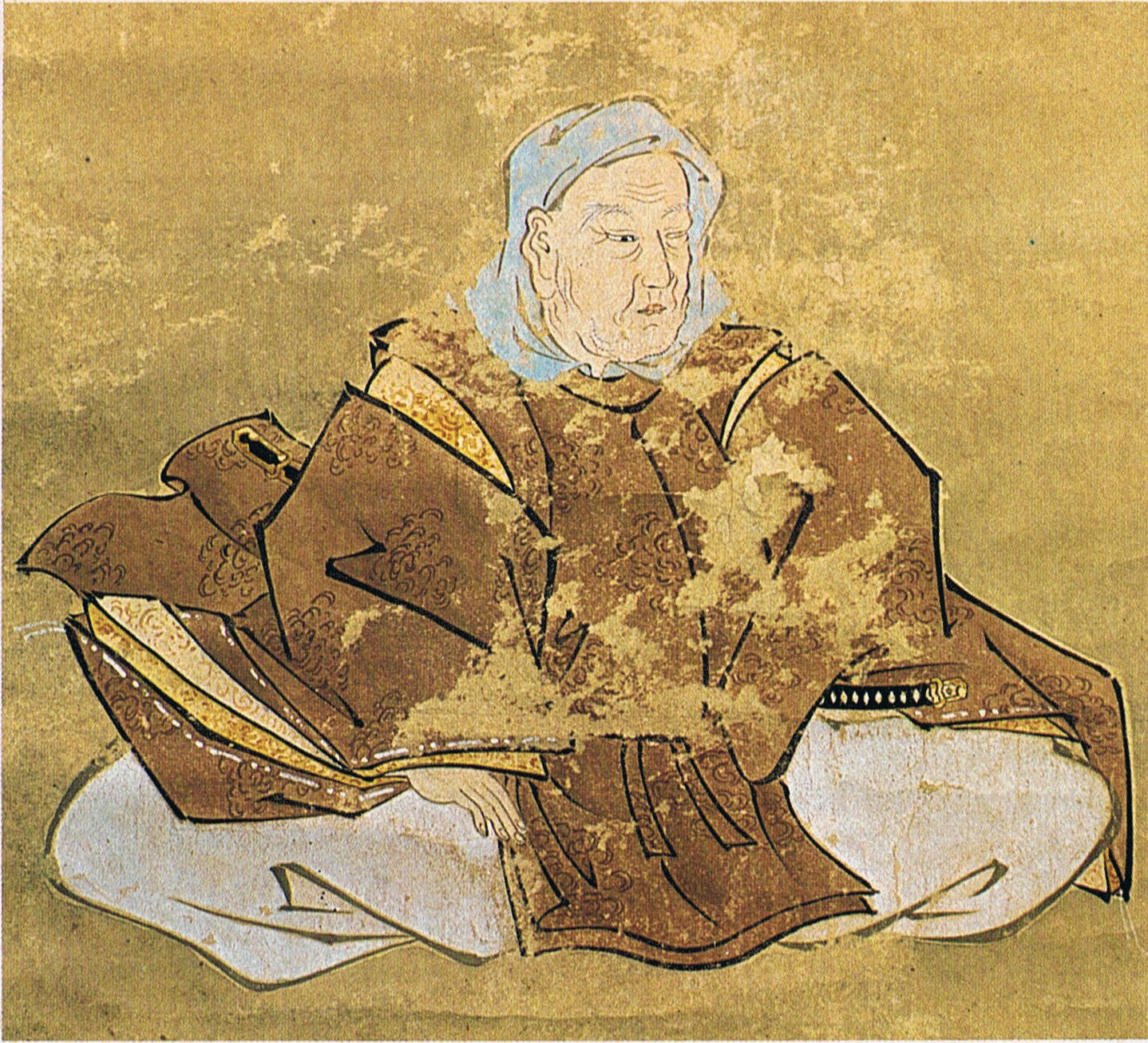
Fujiwara no Hidehira.

Fujiwara no Hidehira (藤原 秀衡; Japanese pronunciation: [ɸɯ̈̀.(ɟ̟͡)ʑí.β̞ä́.ɾä́ nó̞ | çì.dé̞.çì.ɾä̀, -nó̞ çí-]; 1122? – November 30, 1187) was the third ruler of Northern Fujiwara in Mutsu Province, Japan, the grandson of Fujiwara no Kiyohira. During the Genpei War, he controlled his territory independently of the central government; however, he was the official imperial governor for Mutsu Province as of 1181. He offered shelter to the young Minamoto no Yoshitsune, who had escaped from Kyoto. For many years, Hidehira was Yoshitsune's benefactor and protector, and it was from Hidehira's territory that Yoshitsune joined his brother at the start of the Genpei War.

Later, when Yoshitsune incurred his brother Minamoto no Yoritomo's wrath, he returned to Hiraizumi, and lived undisturbed for a time. Yoshitsune was still Hidehira's guest when the latter died in 1187. Hidehira had his son, Fujiwara no Yasuhira, promise to continue to shelter Yoshitune and his retainer Benkei, but Yasuhira gave in to Yoritomo and surrounded the castle with his troops, forcing Yoshitsune to commit seppuku and resulting in the famous standing death of Benkei. Yasuhira then had Yoshitsune's head preserved in a jar of sake and sent to Yoritomo. This did nothing to appease him, and Yoritomo destroyed the Fujiwara domain and killed Yasuhira, son of Hidehira in 1189.

According to legends, one of Hidehira's sons was cared for by wolves after his wife gave birth during a pilgrimage.

Preceded by Fujiwara no Motohira	Northern Fujiwara family head 1157–1187	Succeeded by Fujiwara no Yasuhira
