= Genpei Jōsuiki =

The Genpei Jōsuiki, also known as the Genpei Seisuiki (源平盛衰記), is a 48-book extended version of the Heike Monogatari (The Tale of the Heike).
