= Fujiwara no Yasuhira =

Japanese noble (1155–1189)

Fujiwara no Yasuhira (藤原 泰衡; 1155 – October 14, 1189) was the fourth ruler of Northern Fujiwara in Mutsu Province, Japan, the second son of Hidehira.

At first protecting Yoshitsune, according to his father's will, he was finally forced by Minamoto no Yoritomo to attack Yoshitsune. Yoshitsune, rather than surrender, killed his wife and children and committed suicide. In 1189 Yasuhira was defeated by Yoritomo's forces and subsequently killed in Nienosaku, Hinai District during the Battle of Ōshū. This marked the end of the Northern Fujiwara.

A casket purportedly containing the head of Fujiwara no Yasuhira is housed within the Konjiki-dō at Chūson-ji in Iwate Prefecture.

Preceded by Fujiwara no Hidehira	Northern Fujiwara family head 1187–1189	Succeeded by Clan destroyed
