= Benkei =

Japanese warrior monk (1155–1189)

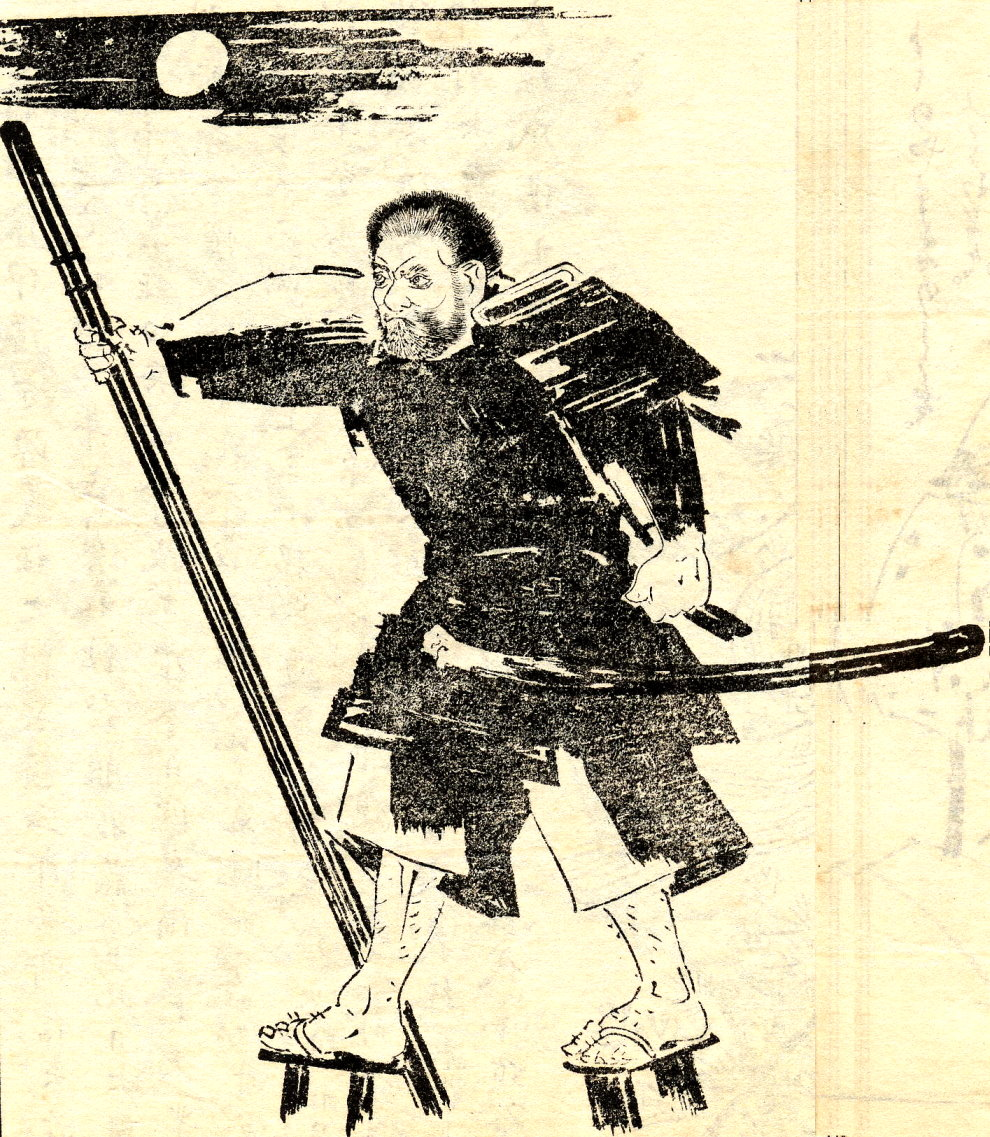
Benkei by Kikuchi Yōsai

Saitō no Musashibō Benkei (西塔 武蔵坊 弁慶; Japanese pronunciation: [mɯ.sa.ɕiꜜ.boː | beꜜŋ.kei, -keː] 1155–1189), popularly known by the mononym Benkei ([beꜜŋ.kei, -keː]), was a Japanese warrior monk (sōhei) who lived in the latter years of the Heian Period (794–1185). Benkei led a varied life, first becoming a monk, then a mountain ascetic, and then a rogue warrior. He later came to respect and serve the famous warrior Minamoto no Yoshitsune, also known as Ushiwakamaru. He is commonly depicted as a man of great strength and loyalty, and a popular subject of Japanese folklore showcased in many ancient and modern literature and productions.

The earliest records of Benkei are in the Azuma Kagami, The Tale of the Heike, and the Genpei Jōsuiki—all sources from around a century or more after Benkei's life. These sources generally only indicate Benkei was one of Yoshitsune's retainers and was a thin monk, although they do indicate Yoshitsune was aided and protected by a band of rogueish sōhei (warrior-monks) near Mount Hiei after he fled the capital—perhaps the historical core of the Benkei legend. Many of the detailed anecdotes and stories of Benkei are from the Gikeiki, an even later 14th-century work. As no contemporary records of Benkei are extant, it is difficult to know which elements of the stories are historical and which are embellished.

== Early life ==
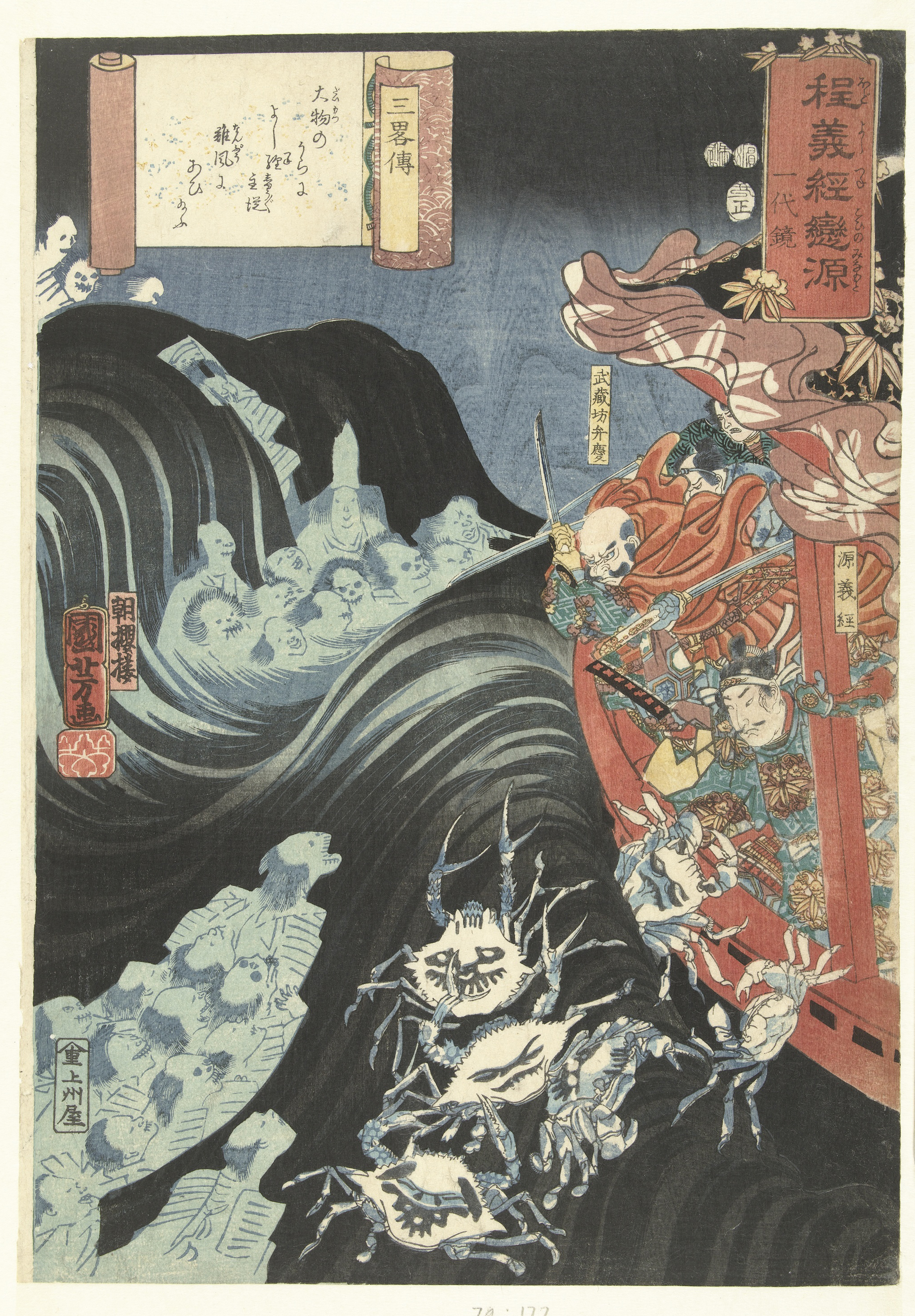
Utagawa Kuniyoshi, Yoshitsune and Benkei defending themselves in their boat during a storm created by the ghosts of conquered Taira warriors

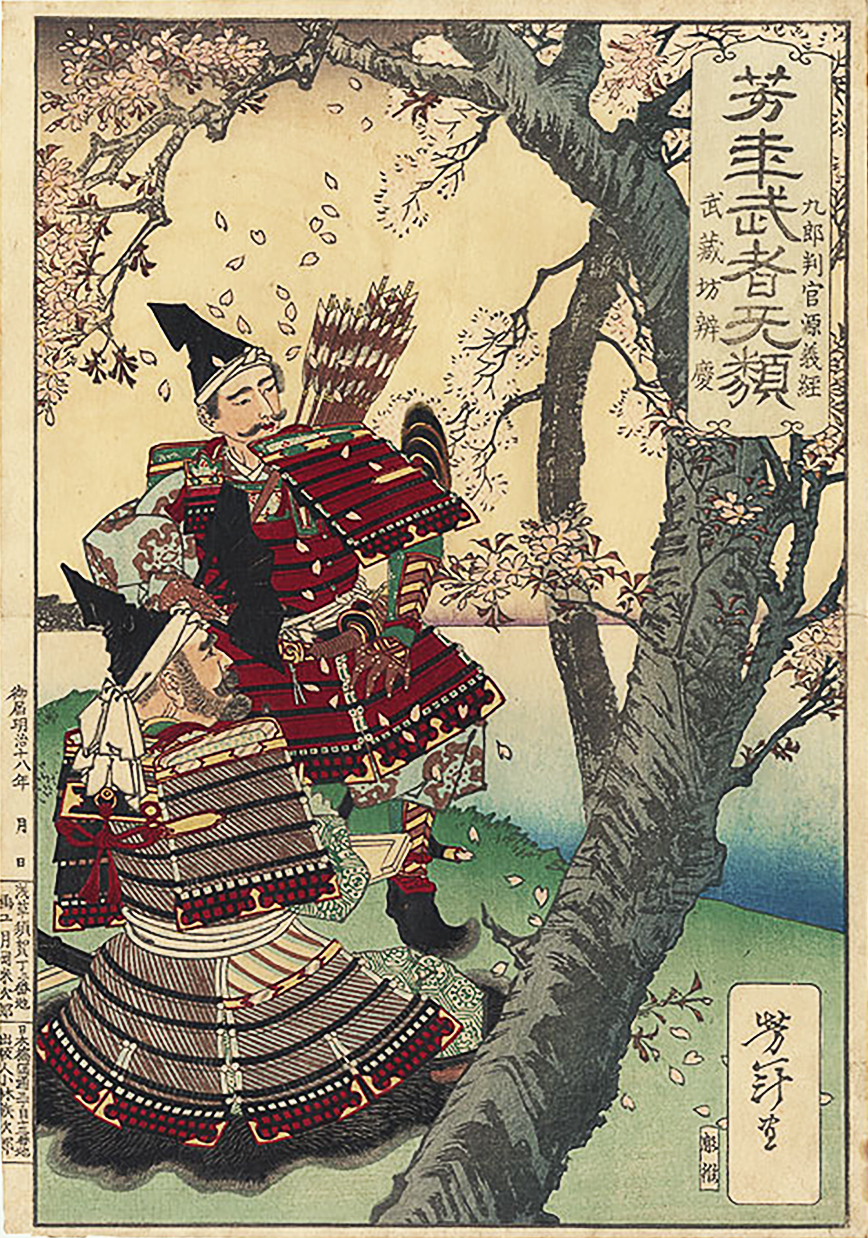
Benkei and Yoshitsune

Stories about Benkei's birth vary considerably. Most stories describe that he was the son of a priest, and some describe that he was the son of a god. Many give him the attributes of a demon, a monster child with wild hair and long teeth. In his youth, Benkei was purportedly nicknamed Oniwakamaru (鬼若丸)—"demon/ogre child".

Benkei chose to join the monastic establishment at an early age and traveled widely among the Buddhist monasteries of Japan. During this period, monasteries were not only important centers of administration and culture, but also military powers in their own right. Like many other monks, Benkei was likely trained in the use of the naginata, the half-moon spear.

At the age of seventeen, Benkei was said to have been 2 metres (6.6 ft) tall. At this point, he left the monasteries, and became a yamabushi, a member of a sect of mountain ascetics. Benkei was commonly depicted wearing a black cap that was a signature theme of such mountain ascetics.

== Seven weapons ==
Benkei iconically wielded seven weapons in addition to his sword, which he is often depicted as carrying on his back. These include a broad axe (masakari), a rake, a sickle (nagigama), a wooden mallet, a saw, an iron or wooden staff or tetsubo, and a Japanese glaive (naginata).

== Career ==
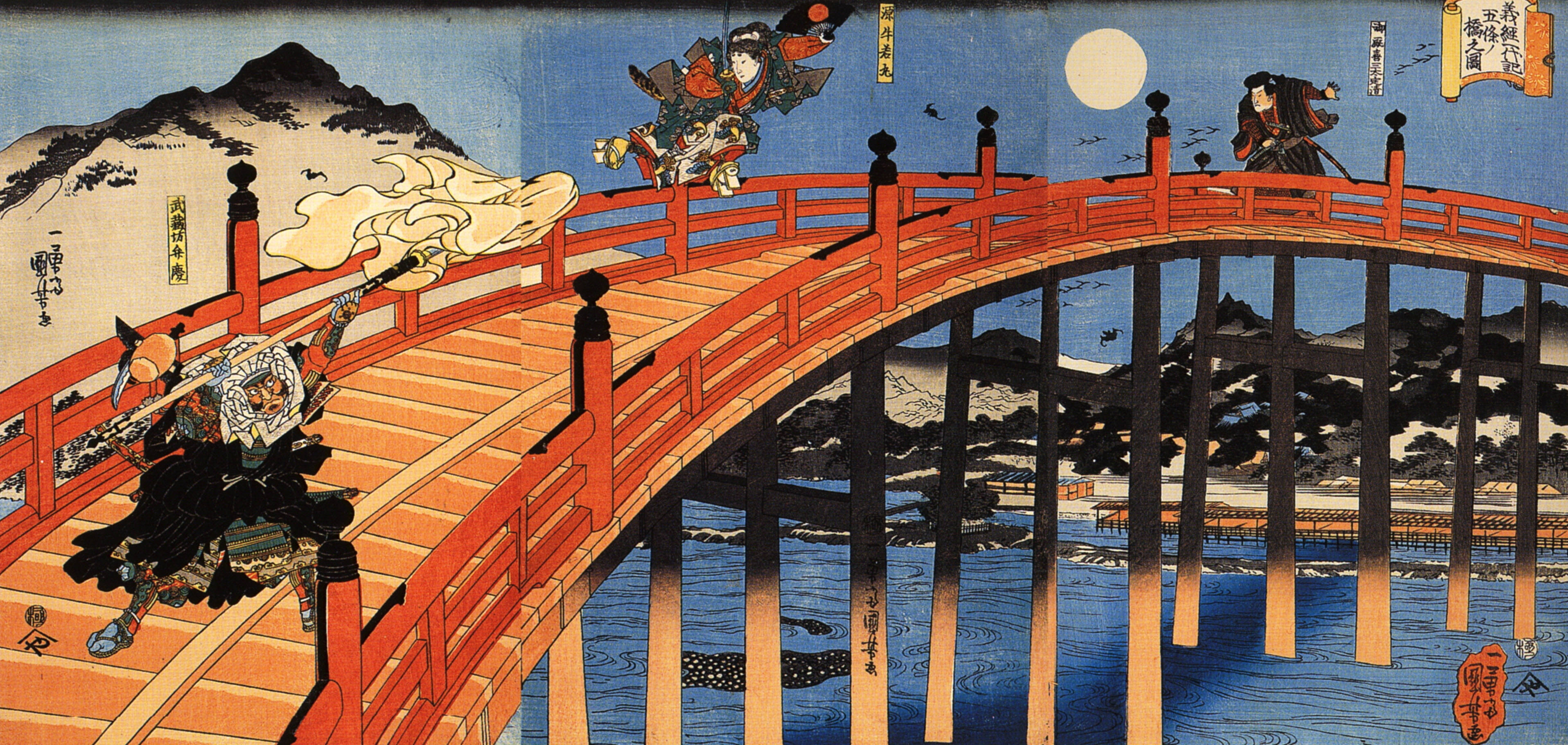
The moonlight fight between Yoshitsune and Benkei. Gojo Bridge, Kyoto

Benkei was said to have wandered around Kyoto every night on a personal quest to take 1000 swords from samurai warriors, who he believed were arrogant and unworthy. After collecting 999 swords through duels and looking for his final prize, he met a young man playing a flute at Gojotenjin Shrine in Kyoto. The much shorter man supposedly carried a gilded sword around his waist. Instead of dueling at the shrine itself, the two walked to Gojo Bridge in the city where the bigger Benkei ultimately lost to the smaller warrior, who happened to be Minamoto no Yoshitsune, a son of Minamoto no Yoshitomo. Some sources claim that the fight took place not at the Gojo Bridge, but instead at Matsubara Bridge. Not long after the duel, Benkei, frustrated and looking for revenge, waited for Yoshitsune at the Buddhist temple of Kiyomizu, where he lost yet again. Henceforth, he became Yoshitsune's retainer and fought with him in the Genpei War against the Taira clan.

From 1185 until his death in 1189, Benkei accompanied Yoshitsune as an outlaw.

== Death ==
In the end, Benkei and Yoshitsune were encircled in the castle of Koromogawa no tate. As Yoshitsune retired to the inner keep of the castle to commit honorable ritual suicide (seppuku) on his own, Benkei stood guard on the bridge in front of the main gate to protect Yoshitsune. It is said that the soldiers were afraid to cross the bridge to confront him, and that all who did met a swift death at the hands of the gigantic man, who killed in excess of 300 trained soldiers.

Realizing that close combat would mean suicide, the warriors following Minamoto no Yoritomo decided to shoot and kill Benkei with arrows instead. Long after the battle should have been over, the soldiers noticed that the arrow-riddled, wound-covered Benkei was still standing. When the soldiers dared to cross the bridge and take a closer look, the heroic warrior fell to the ground, having died standing upright. This is known as the "Standing Death of Benkei" (弁慶の立往生, Benkei no Tachi Ōjō). Benkei died at the age of 34.

Atago-do, now called Benkei-do, features a statue of Benkei six feet two inches (1.88 m) in height in the posture he stood in when he died at Koromogawa. It was built in the era of Shotoku (1711–1716), replacing an older monument. In olden times, the Benkei-do was at the foot of Chusonji hill until it was demolished. The ruins and a single pine tree still remain.

== See also ==
- Ataka
- Benkei on the Bridge
- Funa Benkei
- Kanjinchō
