= List of Noh plays =

This is a complete list of extant pre-modern Noh plays, their supposed authors, and categorisations. A short English translation of the title is given where one exists. A list of those plays which have a separate article on Wikipedia can be found here.

== Categories of plays ==
Some plays are given different names by different schools. The words bangai kyoku signify that a play is no longer part of current repertoire.

The number in parentheses after the play title refers to the play type: (1) god plays; (2) warrior plays; (3) woman plays; (4) madman plays; and (5) devil plays.

The first group of plays are congratulatory pieces and have the atmosphere of rejoicing. The shite is a god who praises the peace and prosperity of the land and performs a dance in celebration. Famous examples are Takasago and Chikubu-shima.

The second group of plays features a shite that is generally a famous warrior of either the Taira or the Minamoto clan. In most plays, the ghost of the warrior appears and tells of the torments it is suffering, but in certain plays such as Tamura and Tadanori, which belong to this class, the atmosphere is rather one of quiet elegance. Famous examples are Michimori and Ebira.

The third group of plays features a shite that is usually a young and beautiful woman, and the atmosphere in play of this class is of gentle, elegant beauty. Apart from the dances, these pieces usually have little movement, but the music is more melodious than in other plays and takes a large part in achieving the total effect. Famous examples include Izutsu, Hagomoro, Yo-hiki.

The fourth group of plays contains twice as many plays as any other group and includes many different types, but in general these plays are more dramatic than any others. They include "madman" pieces (e.g., Koya Monogurui, Tsuchi-guruma); "mad-woman" plays (e.g., Sumidagawa, Hana-gatami); "present-life" pieces, in which the shite is, with only one or two exceptions, a man and unmasked (e.g., Hachi no Ki, Ataka); "obsession" pieces (e.g., Uto, Aya no Tsuzumi).

The fifth group of plays usually features a shite that is a supernatural being, a god or a devil in some form. The plays in this group generally have two acts, and the tempo is faster than in other plays. Famous examples include Orochi, Kurama Tengu, Shakkyo.

== List ==
Name	Kanji	Cat	Author	Schools
Adachi ga hara =Kurozuka	安達原 or 黒塚	2	Zeami	All schools
Aisome-gawa	藍染川	5	unknown	Kanze and Komparu schools
Akechi uchi Conquest of Akechi	明智討	2	Ōmura Yūko	
Akogi	阿漕	4	Zeami	All schools
Ama; Diver Woman / The Fisher-girl	海女 or 海士 or 塰	5	Zeami	All schools
[[Aoi no ue The Lady Aoi |Aoi no ue]] Lady Aoi	葵上	4	unknown, rev. Zeami	All schools
Arashiyama	嵐山	1	Komparu Zenpō	All schools
Aridōshi	蟻通	4	Zeami	All schools
Asagao	朝顔(槿)	?	???	
Ashikari; The Reed Cutter	芦刈 or 葦刈	4	Zeami	All schools
Asukagawa; Asuka River	飛鳥川	4	Zeami	Kongo and Kita schools
Atago Kūya	愛宕空也	5	Kanze Kojirō Nobumitsu	
Ataka	安宅	4	Kojiro	All schools
Atsumori	敦盛	2	Zeami	All schools
Awaji	淡路	1	kusemai by Zeami	Kanze, Komparu, and Kongo schools
Aya no Tsuzumi; The Damask Drum	綾鼓	4	Zeami	Hosho and Kongo schools. Kita school (revised version)
Bashō; The Basho Tree	芭蕉	3	Komparu Zenchiku	All schools
Bukan	豊干	4	unknown	
Chibiki	千引	5	unknown	
Chikubushima	竹生島	1	unknown	All schools
Chōbuku Soga; The Vengeance Ritual	調伏曽我	5	Miyamasu	Hosho, Kongo, and Kita schools
Chōryō; Chiang Liang	張良	5	Kojiro	All schools
Chūrei	忠霊	?	???	
Daibutsu Kuyō =Nara mōde (Komparu name); Dedication Rite for Great Buddha	大仏供養 or 奈良詣	4	unknown	All schools
Daie; The Great Service	大会	5	unknown	All schools
Daihanya	大般若	4/5	bangai kyoku revived 1983	
Dairokuten	第六天	5	unknown	Kanze school
Dampū; The Holy Wind	檀風 or 壇風	5	Zeami	Hosho, Kongo, and Kita schools
Darani Ochiba see also Ochiba	陀羅尼落葉	3	unknown	
Dōjōji	道成寺	4	unknown	All schools
Dōmyōji	道明寺	1	Zeami	Kanze, Kongo, and Kita schools
Ebira; The Quiver	箙	2	Zeami	All schools
Eboshi-ori; The Haymaker	烏帽子折	5	Miyamasu	Kanze, Hosho, Kongo, and Kita schools
Eguchi; Mouth-of-Sound	江口	3	Kan'ami, rev. Zeami	All schools
Ema; The Votive Tablet	絵馬	1	Kongō nanigashi	Kanze, Hosho, Kongo, and Kita schools
Enoshima	江野島 or 江島	1	Yajiro	Kanze school
Fue no Maki; The Flute	笛の巻	4	unknown	Kanze school
Fuji; Wisteria	藤	3	Sa-ami	Kanze, Hosho, and Kongo schools
Fujidaiko; Fuji's drum	富士太鼓	4	Zeami	All schools
Fujisan	富士山 or 不二山	1	Zeami	Komparu and Kongo schools
Fujito; The Wisteria Gate	藤戸	4	Zeami	All schools
Funabashi; The Floating Bridge	船橋	4	Zeami	All schools
Funa Benkei; Benkei in the Boat	舟弁慶 or 船弁慶	5	Kojiro	All schools
Fushimi	伏見	?	Zeami?	
Futari Giō =Giō	二人祇王	3	Zeami	Hosho, Kongo, and Kita schools
Futari Shizuka; The Two Shizukas	二人静	3	Zeami	Kanze, Komparu, Kongo, and Kita schools
Gekkyūden =Tsurukame	月宮殿	1	unknown	All schools
Gendayu	源太夫	1	Zeami	Komparu and Kita schools
Genji kuyō The Mass For Prince Genji	源氏供養	3	Zeami	All schools
Genjō =Kenjō	玄象 or 絃上	5	Kongo	All schools
Genpuku Soga	元服曽我	4	Miyamasu?	
Genzai nue	現在鵺	5	unknown	
Genzai Shichimen	現在七面	5	unknown	Kanze and Kongo schools
Genzai Tadanori	現在忠度	4	unknown	
Genzai Tomoe	現在巴	4	unknown	
Giō	祇王	3	unknown	
Go	碁	?	bangai kyoku	
Goō	護法	4	unknown	
Hachi No Ki; The Dwarf Trees	鉢木	4	Kan-ami	All schools
Hagoromo; The Robe of Feathers	羽衣	3	Zeami	All schools
Hajitomi; The Wicket Gate	半蔀	3	Naitō Tozaemon	All schools
Hakurakuten	白楽天	1	Zeami	Kanze, Komparu, Kongo, and Kita schools
Hana-ikusa	花軍	4	Kanze Nagatoshi	
Hanagatami; The Flower Basket	花筐	4	Zeami	All schools
Hanjo; The Girl Whose Lover Went Away	斑女	4	Zeami	All schools
Hashi Benkei; Benkei on the Bridge	橋弁慶	4	unknown	All schools
Hatsuyuki; Virgin Snow	初雪	4	Komparu Zempō	Komparu school
Hibariyama; Skylark Mountain	雲雀山	4	Zeami	All schools
Higaki; The Cypress Fence	桧垣	3	Zeami	Kanze, Hosho, Kongo, and Kita schools
Himuro	氷室	1	Miyamasu	All schools
Hitachi-obi	常陸帯	4/5	unknown	
Hiun	飛雲	5	unknown	Kanze, Hosho, Kongo, and Kita schools
Hōjōgawa; The River for Setting Things Free	放生川	1	Zeami	Kanze, Hosho, Komparu, and Kongo schools
Hōkazō; The Hoka Priest(s)	放下僧	4	Miyamasu	All schools
Hōso	彭祖	4	unknown	
Hotoke no hara	仏原	3	Zeami	Kanze, Kongo, and Kita schools
Hyakuman; Million	百万	4	Zeami	All schools
Ikarikazuki; The Anchor for a Hand-stone	碇潜	5	Komparu Zenpō	Kanze and Kongo schools
Ikenie; The Pool Sacrifice	生贄 or 池贄	?	???	
Ikkaku sennin The Horned Hermit	一角仙人	5	Komparu Zenpō	Kanze, Komparu, and Kita schools
Ikuta Atsumori	生田敦盛	2	Komparu Zenpō	Kanze, Hosho, Komparu, and Kongo schools
Iwafune	岩船	1	unknown	All schools
Izutsu; The Well	井筒	3	Zeami	All schools
Jinen koji Jinen the Preacher	自然居士	4	Kan'ami	All schools
Kagekiyo	景清	4	Zeami	All schools
Kagetsu	花月	4	Zeami	All schools
Kakitsubata; The Irises	杜若	3	Zeami	All schools
Kamo	賀茂	1	Zenchiku	All schools
Kamo monogurui Madwoman at Kamo Shrine	賀茂物狂	4	Zenchiku	Hosho, Kongo, and Kita schools
Kamo no Chōmei	鴨長明	?	???	
Kanameishi	要石	?	???	
Kanawa; The Iron Crown/Tripod	鉄輪	4	Zeami	All schools
Kanehira; Imai's End	兼平	2	Zeami	All schools
Kanemaki	鐘巻	?	Kanze Nobumitsu	
Kannyōkyū; The Palace of Hsienyang	咸陽宮	4	unknown	Kanze, Hosho, Kongo, and Kita schools
Kantan; Life and Dream	邯鄲	4	Zeami	All schools
Kappo	合浦 or 合甫	5	unknown	Kanze school
Kasa sotoba The Covered Gravepost	笠卒塔婆	?	Kanze Motomasa? bangai kyoku	
Kashiwa-zaki	柏崎	4	Enami	All schools
Kasuga Ryūjin; The Kasuga Dragon God	春日龍神	5	Zeami	All schools
Kayoi Komachi; Komachi and the Suitor	通小町	4	Kan'ami	All schools
Kazuraki	葛城	3	Zeami	All schools
Kazuraki tengu	葛城天狗	5	Kanze Nagatoshi	
Kenjō; Genjō	絃上 or 玄象	5	Kawakami kannushi	
Kiku jidō Makura jidō	菊慈童 or 枕慈童	4	unknown	
Kinsatsu; The Golden Tablet	金札	1	Zeami	All schools
Kinuta; The Fulling Board	砧	4	Zeami	All schools
Kirikane Soga	切兼曽我	4	unknown	
Kiso; Lord Kiso	木曽	4	unknown	Kanze school
Kiyotsune	清経	2	Zeami	All schools
Kochō; The Butterfly	胡蝶	3	Kojiro	Kanze, Hosho and Kongo schools
Kodama Ukifune; The Wood Spirit Ukifune	木霊浮舟 or 木玉浮舟	?	bangai kyoku	
Kogō; Lady Kogō	小督	4	Zenchiku	All schools
Koi no Matsubara	恋の松原	4	unknown	
Koi no Omoni; The Burden of Love	恋重荷	4	Zeami	Kanze school
Kokaji	小鍛冶	5	unknown	All schools
Komachi uta arasoi	???	?	???	
Komachi sōshi	???	?	???	
Kosode Soga; Soga's Robes	小袖曽我	4	Miyamasu	All schools
Kōtei; The Emperor	皇帝	5	Kojiro	Kanze, Hosho, Kongo, and Kita schools
Kōu; Hsiang You	項羽	5	Zeami	All schools
Kōya monogurui The Madman of Mt. Kōya	高野物狂	4	Zeami, Kanze Motomasa	Kanze, Hosho, Kongo, and Kita schools
Kumasaka; The Robber	熊坂	5	Zenchiku	All schools
Kurama-tengu; The Goblin of Kurama	鞍馬天狗	5	Miyamasu	All schools
Kureha	呉服	1	Zeami	All schools
Kurikara otoshi The Fall from Kurikara	倶利伽羅落	?	bangai kyoku	
Kurozuka =Adachi ga hara (Kanze name)	黒塚 or 安達原	5	unknown	All schools
Kurumazō; The Carriage Priest	車僧	5	Zeami	All schools
Kusanagi	草薙	5	unknown	Hosho school
Kusenoto	久世戸	1	Kojiro	Kanze school
Kusu no tsuyu Camphor Tree in Dew	楠露	4	unknown	Kanze school
Kuzu	国栖	5	Zeami	All schools
Maiguruma; The Dance Waggons	舞車	4	bangai kyoku	
Makiginu; The Rolls of Silk	巻絹	4	Kan-ami	Kanze, Hosho, Kongo, and Kita schools
Makura Jidō; Jidō and the Pillow; Kiku Jidō	枕慈童	4	unknown	All schools
Manjū see also Nakamitsu (Kanze name)	満仲	4	Zeami	Kanze, Hosho, Kongo, and Kita schools
Mari; The Football	鞠	?	bangai kyoku	
Matsu-no-o	松尾	1	Zeami	Hosho school
Matsukaze; The Wind in the Pines	松風	3	Zeami	All schools
Matsumushi; The Chirp of the Crickets	松虫	4	Keami	All schools
Matsuyama kagami The Mirror of Matsuyama	松山鏡	5	unknown	Kanze, Kongo, and Kita schools
Matsuyama tengu	松山天狗	5	unknown	Kongo schools
Me-kari	和布刈	1	Zenchiku	Kanze, Hosho, Kongo, and Kita schools
Michimori	通盛	2	Iami	All schools
Miidera (play)	三井寺	4	unknown	All schools
Mi-mosuso =The Train of the Heavenly Robe	御裳濯	1	Zeami	Komparu school
Minase	水無瀬	4	unknown	Kita school
Minazuki-barae; The Purification Ceremony in the Sixth Month	水無月祓	4	Zeami	Kanze school
Minobu	身延	3	unknown	Kanze school
Mitsuyama; The Three Mountains	三山	4	Zeami	Hosho and Kongo schools
Miwa	三輪	3	Zeami	All schools
Mochizuki	望月	4	Sa-ami	All schools
Momiji-gari; The Maple Viewing	紅葉狩	5	Kojiro	All schools
Morihisa	盛久	4	Motomasa	All schools
Motomezuka; The Burial Mound	求塚	4	Kan'ami	Kanze, Hosho, Kongo, and Kita schools
Muro gimi The Courtesans of Muro	室君	4	unknown	Kanze and Komparu schools
Murozumi	室住	?	bangai kyoku	
Mutsura	六浦	3	Zeami	All schools
Nakamitsu =Kanze name for Manjū	仲光 or 満仲	4	Zeami	
Naniwa	難波	1	Zeami	All schools
Nara mōde =Komparu name for Daibutsu kuyō	奈良詣 or 大仏供養	4	unknown	
Nezame	寝覚	1	unknown	Kanze school
Nishikido	錦戸	4	Miyamasu	Kanze and Hosho schools
Nishiki-gi; The Decorated Tree	錦木	4	Zeami	All schools
Niwatori Tatsuta	鶏竜田	5	unknown	
Nomori; Guardian of the Fields	野守	5	Zeami	All schools
Nonomiya; The Shrine in the Fields	野宮	3	Zeami	All schools
Nue; The Fabulous Bird	鵺	5	Zeami	All schools
Oba-sute; The Old Woman Abandoned in the Hills	姨捨	3	Zeami	Kanze, Hosho, Kongo, and Kita schools
Ochiba (no miya); Fallen Leaves	落葉(宮)	3	Zeami	Kongo school
Ōe-yama; Demon of Ōeyama	大江山	5	Miyamasu	All schools
Ohara gokō The Imperial Visit to Ohara	大原御幸 or 小原御幸	3	Zeami	Kanze, Hosho, Kongo, and Kita schools
Oimatsu; The Aged Pine	老松	1	Zeami	All schools
Okina (Noh); The Old Man	翁	0 (unique)	unknown	All schools
Omina-meshi; Damsel Flower	女郎花	4	Zeami	All schools
Ōmu Komachi; Komachi and the Echoing Poem	鸚鵡小町	3	Zeami	Kanze, Hosho, Kongo, and Kita schools
Orochi; The Dragon	大蛇	5	Kojiro	Hosho, Kongo, and Kita schools
Oshio	小塩	3	Zenchiku	All schools
Ō-yashiro; The Great Shrine	大社	1	Yajiro	Kanze, Kongo, and Kita schools
Raiden; Thunder and Lightning (Kongo name: Tsumado)	雷電; Hosho: 来殿	5	Miyamasu	Kanze, Hosho, and Kita schools
Rashōmon	羅生門	5	Kojiro	Kanze, Hosho, Kongo, and Kita schools
Rinzō; The Revolving Sutra Case	輪蔵	1	Yajiro	Kanze and Kita schools
Rō-taiko; The Prison Drum	籠太鼓	4	Zeami	All schools
Rō Giō; Prison Giō	籠祇王	3	Kanze Motomasa?	
Ryōko; The Dragon and the Tiger	龍虎	5	Kojiro	Kanze and Kita schools
Sagi; The Heron	鷺	4	Zeami	Kanze, Hosho, Kongo, and Kita schools
Saigyōzakura; Saigyō's and the Cherry Blossom	西行桜	4	Zeami	All schools
Saka-hoko; The Spear of the Gods	逆鉾	1	Miyamasu	Kanze school
Sakura-gawa; Cherry River	桜川	4	Zeami	All schools
Sakurai-eki; The Post-town of Sakurai (earlier form of Kusu no Tsuru)	桜井(駅)	4	unknown	All schools
Sanemori	実盛	2	Zeami	All schools
Sanshō; Laughter Among the Sages	三笑	4	unknown	Kanze, Hosho, Kongo, and Kita schools
Sasaki	佐々木	?	Heike (book 9)	
Sao-yama	佐保山	1	Zeami	All schools
Seigan-ji	誓願寺	3	Zeami	All schools
Sei-ōbo; Hsi Wang Mu	西王母	1	Zeami	All schools
Sekidera Komachi; Komachi at Sekidera Temple	関寺小町	3	Zeami	All schools
Sekihara Yoichi	関寺与市	4	unknown	Kita school
Semimaru	蝉丸	4	Zeami	All schools
Senju	千手 or 千寿	3	Zenchiku	All schools
Sesshōseki; The Death Rock	殺生石	5	Sa-ami	All schools
Settai; The Welcome	摂待	4	Miyamasu	Kanze, Hosho, Kongo, and Kita schools
Shakkyō; The Stone Bridge	石橋	5	Motomasa	All schools
Shari; The Bones of the Buddha	舎利	5	Zeami	All schools
Shichiki-ochi; Seven Escape	七騎落	4	All schools	
Shiga	志賀	1	Zeami	Kanze, Hosho, Kongo, and Kita schools
Shigehira =Kasa sotoba	重衡	2	unknown	
Shigemori	重盛	4	bangai kyoku	
Shikiji monogurui	敷地物狂	4	bangai kyoku	
Shikimi tengu Goblins among the Flowers	樒天狗	?	unknown	
Shirahige	白髭	1	Kan-ami	Kanze, Comparu, and Kita schools
Shironushi	代主	1	Zeami	Kanze school
Shōjō; The Tippling Elf	猩々	5	unknown	All schools
Shō-ki	鍾馗	5	Zeami	All schools
(Ō) Shōkun; Wang Zhaojun	(王)昭君	5	Komparu Gon-no-kami	All schools
Shōzon	正尊	4	Yajiro	Kanze, Hosho, Kongo, and Kita schools
Shunkan; Kita name: Kikaigashima	俊寛 or 鬼界島	4	Zeami	All schools
Shun-ei	春栄	4	Zeami	All schools
Shunzei Tadanori; Shunzei and Tadanori	俊成忠度	2	Naitō Tozaemon	Kanze, Hosho, Kongo, and Kita schools
Sonoda	園田	?	?	
Sōshi-arai Komachi; Komachi and the Forget Entry	草紙洗(小町)	3	Kan-ami	All schools
Sotoba Komachi; Komachi and Sotoba	卒都婆小町	4	Kan-ami	All schools
Suma Genji; Prince Genji's Exile in Suma	須磨源氏	5	Zeami	Kanze, Hosho, Kongo, and Kita schools
Sumida-gawa; The Sumida River	隅田川 or 角田川	4	Motomasa	All schools
Sumiyoshi mōde The Pilgrimage to Sumiyoshi	住吉詣	3	unknown	Kanze, Kongo, and Kita schools
Sumizomezakura	墨染桜	3	unknown	
Tadanobu	忠信	4	Zenchiku	Kanze and Hosho schools
Tadanori	忠度	2	Zeami	All schools
Taema	当麻	5	Zeami	All schools
Taihei shōjō The Tippling Elves and the Vat of Wine	大瓶猩々	5	unknown	Kanze school
Taisampukun; Archdemon Taisan	泰山府君	5	Zeami	Kongo school
Taisei Taishi	太施太子 or 泰世太子	?	Nobumitsu bangai kyoku	
Taiten	大典	1	???	
Takasago/Aioi; Growing Old Together	高砂 or 相老	1	Zeami	All schools
Take no yuki Snow on the Bamboo	竹雪	4	Zeami	Hosho and Kita schools
Tama-kazura; The Jeweled Chaplet	玉葛 or 玉鬘	4	Zenchiku	All schools
Tama-no-i; Jewelled Well	玉井	1	Kojiro	Kanze, Kongo, and Kita schools
Tamura	田村	2	Zeami	All schools
Tango monogurui The Madman of Tango	丹後物狂	4	Iami, rev. Zeami bangai kyoku	
Tanikō; Burial Alive	谷行	5	Zenchiku	All schools
Tankai	湛海	4	unknown	
Tatsuta	龍田 or 竜田	4	Zenchiku	All schools
Teika	定家	3	Zeami	All schools
Tenko; The Drum from Heaven	天鼓	4	Zeami	All schools
Tōboku; The Northeastern Hall	東北	3	Zeami	All schools
Tōbō-saku	東方朔	1	Komparu Zenpō	Kanze, Komparu, and Kita schools
Tōei	藤永 or 藤栄	4	Zeami	Hosho, Komparu, Kongo, and Kita schools
Tōgan koji	東岸居士	4	Zeami	Kanze, Hosho, Kongo, and Kita schools
Tokusa; Scouring Rushes	木賊	4	Zeami	Kanze, Hosho, Kongo, and Kita schools
Tomoakira	知章	2	Zeami	Kanze, Komparu, Kongo, and Kita schools
Tomoe	巴	2	Zeami	All schools
Tomonaga	朝長	2	Zeami	All schools
Tori-oi-bune; The Bird-scarers (Hosho name: Tori-oi)	鳥追(舟)	4	Kongo Yataro	All schools
Tōru =Shiogama	融 or 塩釜	5	Zeami	All schools
Tōsen; The Chinese ship	唐船	4	Tobi Matagoro	All schools
Tsuchi-gumo; The Ground-spider	土蜘蛛	5	unknown	All schools
Tsuchi guruma The Barrow	土車	5	Zeami	Kanze and Kita schools
Tsunemasa	経政 or 経正	2	Zeami	All schools
Tsurugoaka	鶴岡	?	bangai kyoku	
Tsurukame =Kita name: Gekkyūden; The Crane and Tortoise	鶴亀 or 月宮殿	1	unknown	All schools
U no matsuri Cormorant Festival	鵜祭	1	unknown	
Uchito mōde The Pilgrimage to Ise Shrines	内外詣	1	Kongō Nagayori	Kongo school
Ugetsu; The Moon and the Rain	雨月	4	Zenchiku	All schools
Ukai; The Cormorant Fisher	鵜飼	5	Enami no Saemon	All schools
Ukifune; A Drifting Boat	浮舟	4	Yoko-o Motohisa	Kanze, Komparu, Kongo, and Kita schools
Ukon	右近	1	Zeami	Kanze, Hosho, and Kongo schools
Ume	梅	3	Kanze Motoakira	Kanze school
Ume-ga-e; The Plum Branch	梅枝	4	Zeami	All schools
Uneme; The Lady-in-Waiting	釆女	3	Zeami	All schools
U-no-Matsuri; The Cormorant Festival	(kanji)	1	Komparu school	
Unrin'in; Unrin Temple	雲林院	4	Zeami	Kanze, Hosho, Kongo, and Kita schools
Urashima	浦島	1	Kanze Miyamasu	
Uroko-gata; The Snake=scale Banner	鱗形	1	unknown	Kongo and Kita schools
Uta-ura; The Soothsayer	歌占	4	Motomasa	All schools
Utō; Birds of Sorrow	善知鳥	4	Zeami	All schools
Utsusemi; The Cicada's Shell	空蝉	?	bangai kyoku	
Yamamba; The Old Woman of the Hills	山姥	5	Zeami	All schools
Yashima =Yoshitsune; The Battle of Yashima	八島 or 屋島 or 義経	2	Zeami	All schools
Yō-kihi; Everlasting Sorrow	楊貴妃	3	Zenchiku	All schools
Yorimasa	頼政	2	Zeami	All schools
Yōrō; The Care of the Aged	養老	1	Zeami	All schools
Yoro-boshi; The Priest With the Faltering Tread	弱法師	4	Motomasa	All schools
Yoshino Shizuka; Shizuka in Yoshino	吉野静	3	Kan'ami	All schools
Yoshino Tennin; The Goddess at Yoshino	吉野天人	3	Kojiro	Kanze school
Yo-uchi Soga; The Soga Brother's Attach at Night	夜討曽我	4	Miyamasu	All schools
Yūgao; Evening Faces	夕顔	3	Zeami	Kanze, Kongo, and Kita schools
Yugyō Yanagi; The Priest and the Willow	遊行柳	3	Kojiro	All schools
Yuki; Snow	雪	3	unknown	Kongo school
Yumi Yawata; The Bow ad the Hachiman Shrine	弓八幡	1	Zeami	All schools
Yuya	熊野 or 湯谷	3	Zeami	All schools
Zegai	善界,是界 or 是我意	5	Takeda Hoin	All schools
Zenji Soga; The Priest Soga	禅師曽我 or 禅師曾我	4	unknown	Kanze, Hosho, and Kita schools
