= Kiichi Hōgen =

Japanese onmyouji and warrior, character from "Gikeiki"

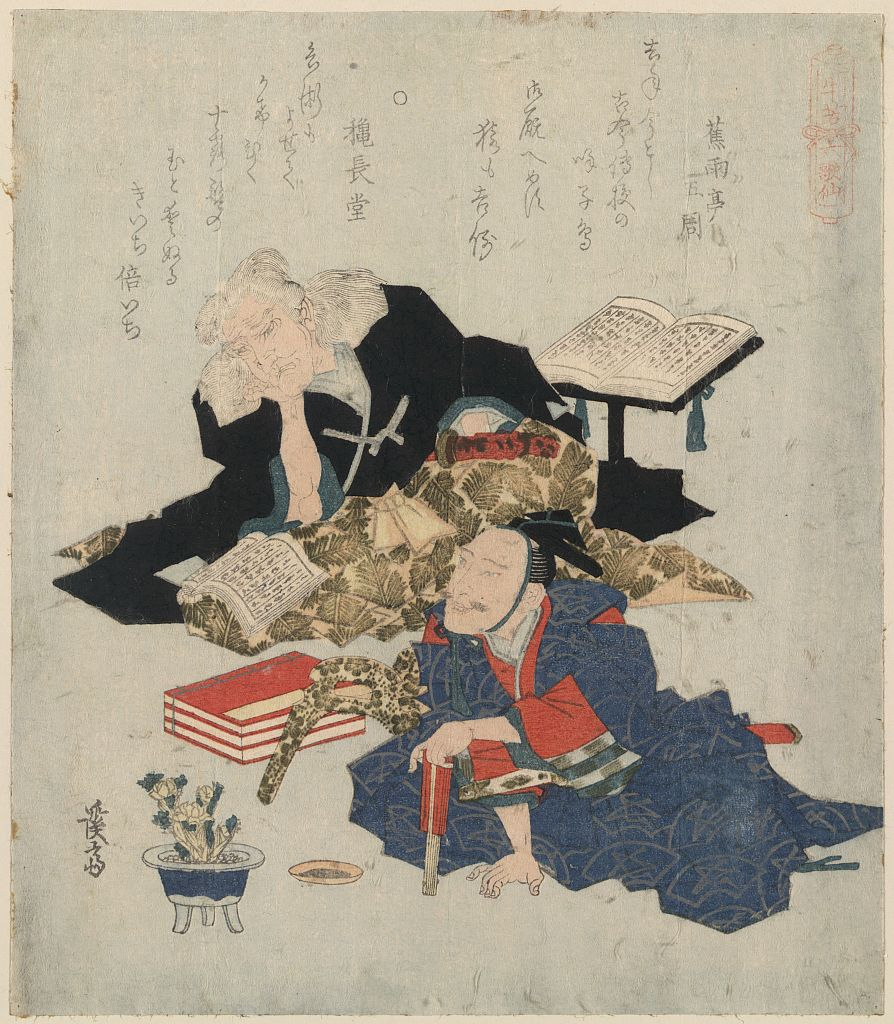
Kiichi Hōgen and fellow poet Oumaya Kisanta

Kiichi Hōgen (jp. 鬼一法眼) is a legendary Japanese monk and warrior from the 1100s who appeared in "Gikeiki", a military epic about the life of Minamoto no Yoshitsune, written in the early Muromachi period. Hōgen is a honorific title for a monk, not a name, so that Kiichi Hōgen literally means "First Demon Priest".

He was an onmyoji who resided at Ichijo-dori Horikawa-dori in Heian-kyō (Kyoto), and was an authority on the magical art of warfare called Rikuto-heiho. It is believed that he excelled both in academics and military arts. A well-known legend has it that Yoshitsune stole Kiichi's family heirloom military book Rikuto in collaboration with Kiichi's daughter, Minazuru-hime. Due to his legendary status, he is sometimes identified with Kurama Tengu, also a sage (a tengu instead of a human) of Mount Kurama credited in some versions with teaching the young Minamoto no Yoshitsune swordsmanship, tactics, and magic.

He is revered as the founder of Kyōhachi-ryū (eight styles considered the inspiration to all swordsmanship in West Japan, and the combat techniques Kiichi taught his eight best disciples, including Minamoto-no-Yoshitsune) school of swordplay and as the deity of swordplay. His teachings, often taken from Rikuto (such as the adage If it comes meet it, if it leaves, send it on its way, if it opposes then unify it. 5 and 5 are 10, 1 and 9 are 10, 2 and 8 are 10. The large suppresses all, the small enters the microscopic. The power of life and death), influenced later martial artists, including Morihei Ueshiba, founder of aikido.

He is a main character of a jidaimono Kiichi Hōgen sanryaku no maki, written in 1731 by Hasegawa Senshi(長谷川千四) and Matsuda Bunkōdō (和田文耕堂) for the Takemoto-za. The play originally had five acts, but only two main parts have survived: "Kikubatake" ("The Chrysanthemum Garden"), the main scene of the 3rd act, and "Ichijō Ōkura Monogatari", the core of the 4th act. The final act, "Gojō no Hashi" is rarely performed.

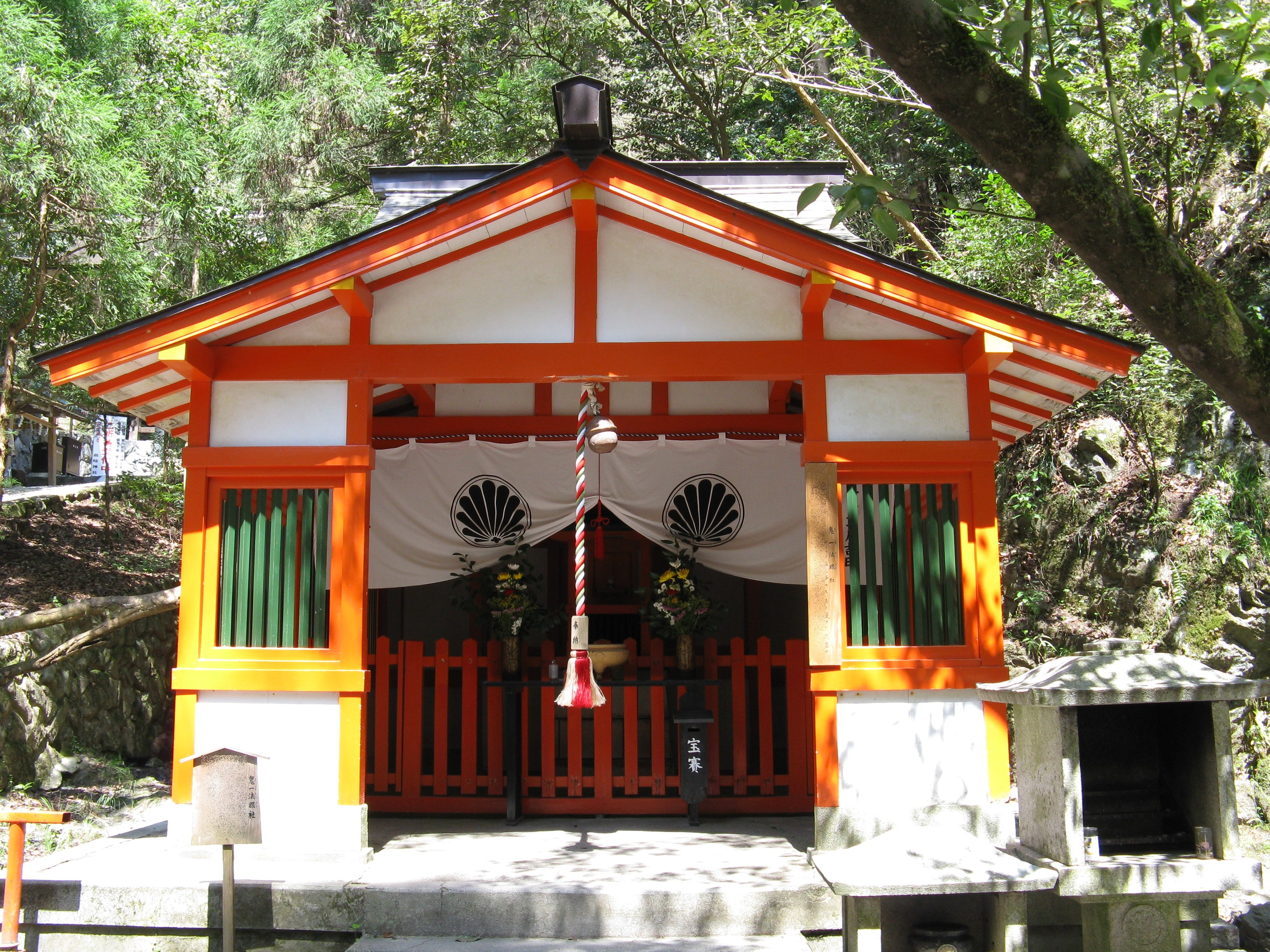
Kiichihōgensha

In Sakyō-ku, Kyoto, next to Kurama Elementary School in Kuramahonmachi, there is a stone monument 'Kiichi Hōgen historic site' which is said to be the site of Kiichi Hōgen's mansion and tomb. It was erected on November 10, 1918 by Kurama school staff.

In addition, there is a shrine, Kiichi hōgen sha, in the precincts of Kurama-dera, visited often by people wishing for improvement in the martial arts.

== See also ==
- Oshizamurai Kiichihōgan
