= Sōjōbō =

Tengu chief

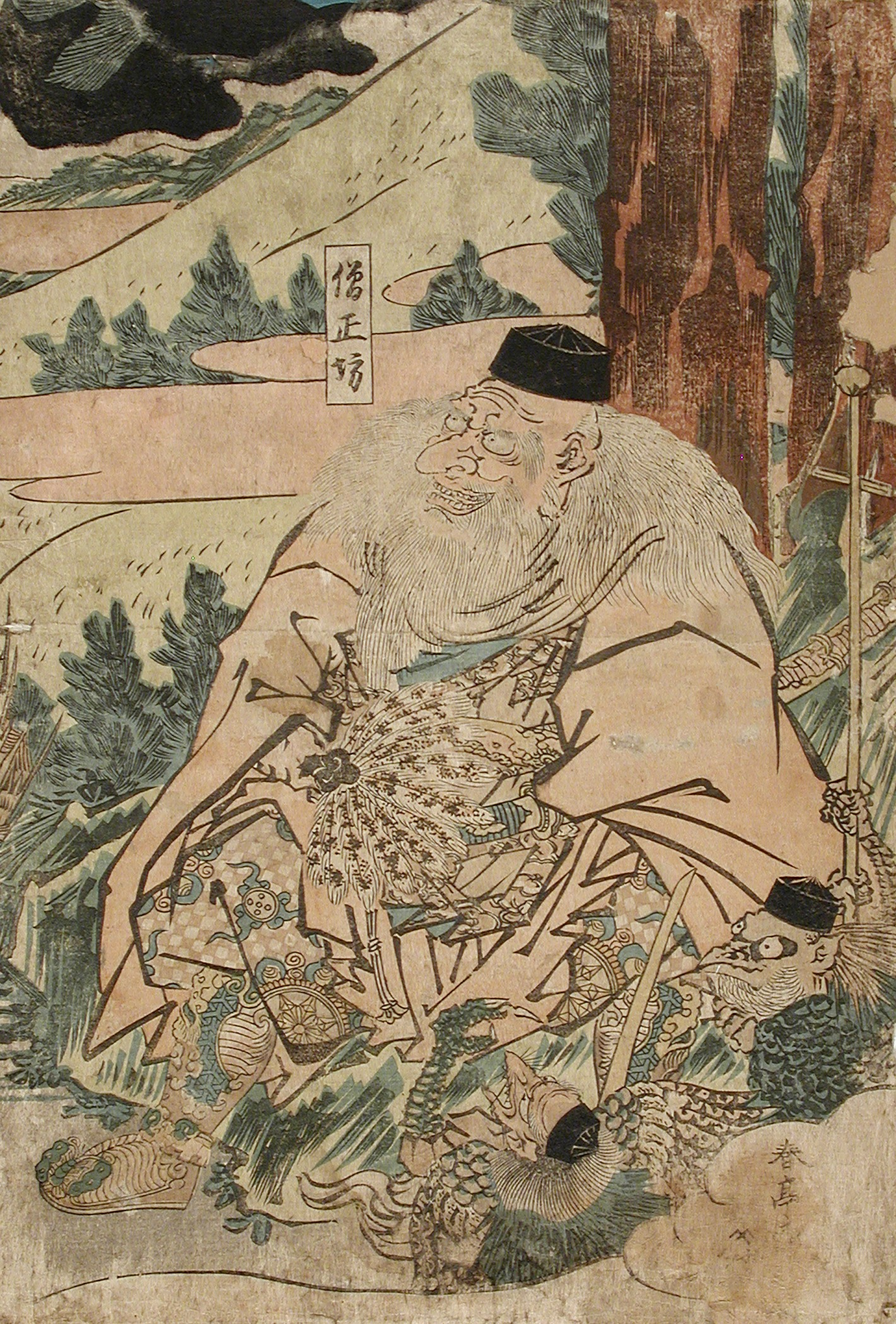

Creature information
- Other name(s): King of the tengu, Kurama tengu, Great tengu
- Grouping: Legendary creatures
- Sub grouping: Tengu

Origin
- Country: Japan
- Habitat: Mount Kurama

In Japanese folklore and mythology, Sōjōbō (Japanese: 僧正坊; pronounced [soːʑoːboː]) is the mythical king and god of the tengu, legendary creatures thought to inhabit the mountains and forests of Japan. Sōjōbō is a specific type of tengu called daitengu and has the appearance of a yamabushi, a Japanese mountain hermit. Daitengu have a primarily human form with some bird-like features such as wings and claws. The other distinctive physical characteristics of Sōjōbō include his long, white hair and unnaturally long nose.

Sōjōbō is said to live on Mount Kurama. He rules over the other tengu that inhabit Mount Kurama in addition to all the other tengu in Japan. He is extremely powerful, and one legend says he has the strength of 1,000 normal tengu.

Sōjōbō is perhaps best known for the legend of his teaching the warrior Minamoto no Yoshitsune (then known by his childhood name Ushiwaka-maru or Shanao) the arts of swordsmanship, tactics, and magic.

== Etymology ==
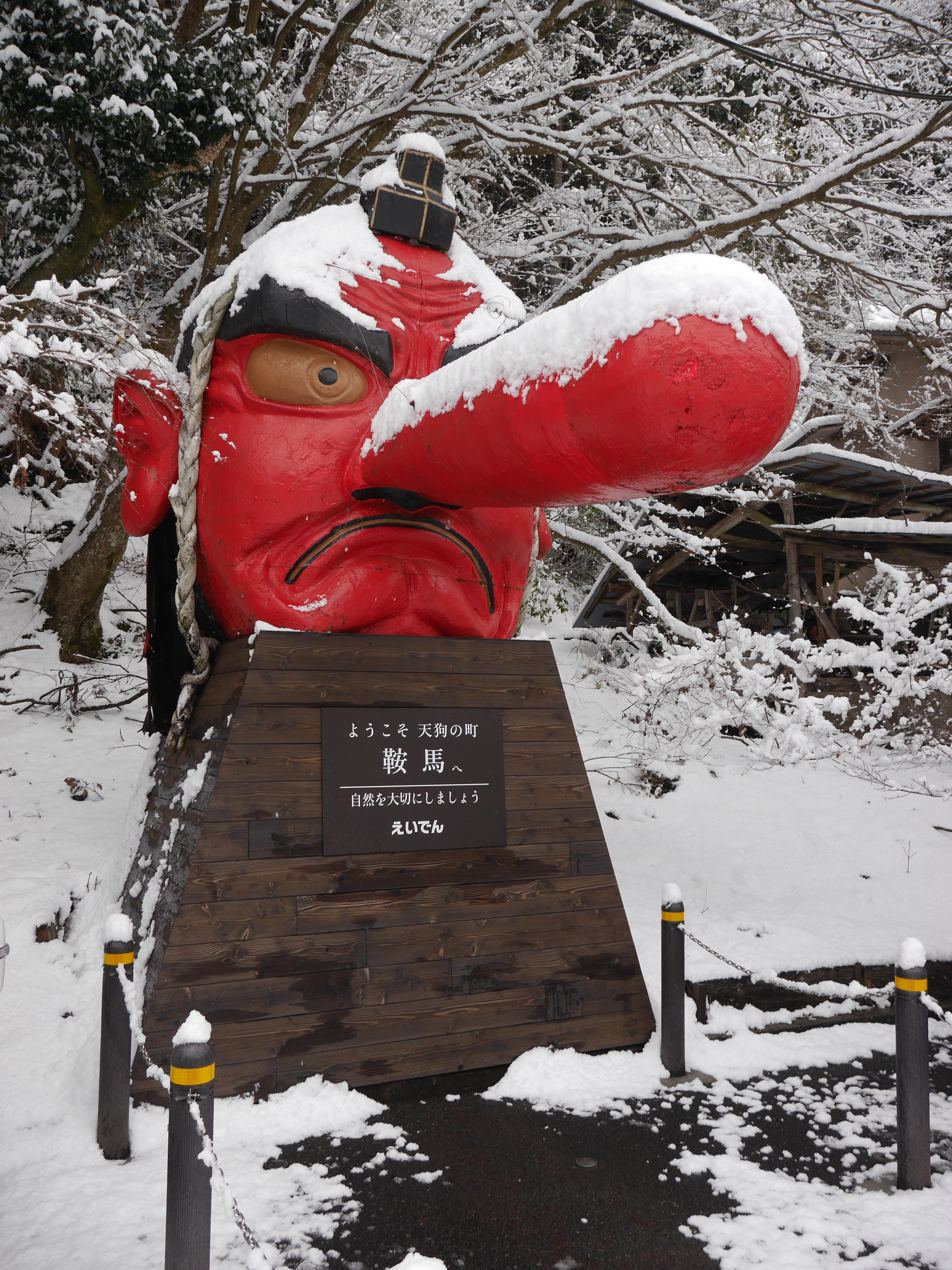
Tengu statue at Mount Kurama

Most tengu are referred to impersonally. Sōjōbō is an exception and is one of the tengu that are given personal names and recognised as individual personalities. The name Sōjōbō originated in a text called Tengu Meigikō, which dates back to the middle of the Edo period in Japan.

The name Sōjōbō originates from Sōjōgatani, the valley at Mount Kurama near Kibune Shrine associated with the Shugenja. It is in this valley that Ushiwaka-maru trained with Sōjōbō in legend. Sōjōgatani means Bishop's valley or Bishop's vale. The name of this valley is derived from the ascetic Sōjō Ichiyen.

In Japanese, the name Sōjōbō is composed of three kanji: 僧,正,坊. The first two characters of Sōjōbō's name,sōjō (僧正) mean "Buddhist high priest" in Japanese. The final kanji, bō (坊), also means "Buddhist priest" but is also commonly used to mean yamabushi.

The yamabushi (山伏; "those who lie down in the mountains") are ascetics from the Shugendō tradition. Shugendō (修驗道; "way of cultivating supernatural power") incorporates elements of many religious traditions, including Buddhism. Both tengu and yamabushi had a reputation for dwelling in the mountains. Yves Bonnefoy suggests that this contributed to the folk belief that yamabushi and tengu were identical or at least closely connected.

=== Other names ===
Sōjōbō is also referred to by other names and titles that function as names. Sōjōbō is sometimes called the Kurama tengu. This name references Sōjōbō's mountain home, Mount Kurama. Ronald Knutsen refers to Sōjōbō by the title of Tengu-san. Sōjōbō is also named by references to his title as the king of the tengu. For example, James de Benneville refers to Sōjōbō using the term goblin-king. Similarly, Catherina Blomberg says that the titles "Dai Tengu (Great Tengu) or Tengu Sama (Lord Tengu)" are used to name Sōjōbō. Sometimes, Sōjōbō is named using both a title and a reference to Mount Kurama. The Noh play Kurama-Tengu, for example, features a character named Great Tengu of Mount Kurama.

== Mythology ==
Now is the time, to show the world

those arts of war

that for many months and years

upon the Mountain of Kurama

I have rehearsed

— Miyamasu, Eboshi-ori

Sōjōbō is known for his relationship with the Japanese warrior Minamoto no Yoshitsune in legend. After Yoshitsune's father was killed in a battle with the Taira clan, the young Yoshitsune was sent to a temple on Mount Kurama. On Mount Kurama, Yoshitsune met Sōjōbō and was trained by him in martial arts. Yoshitsune became a highly skilled warrior as a result of Sōjōbō's training. For example, in the war epic Heiji monogatari (The Tale of Heiji) it is said that the training young Yoshitsune received "was the reason why he could run and jump beyond the limits of human power"

=== Portrayal ===
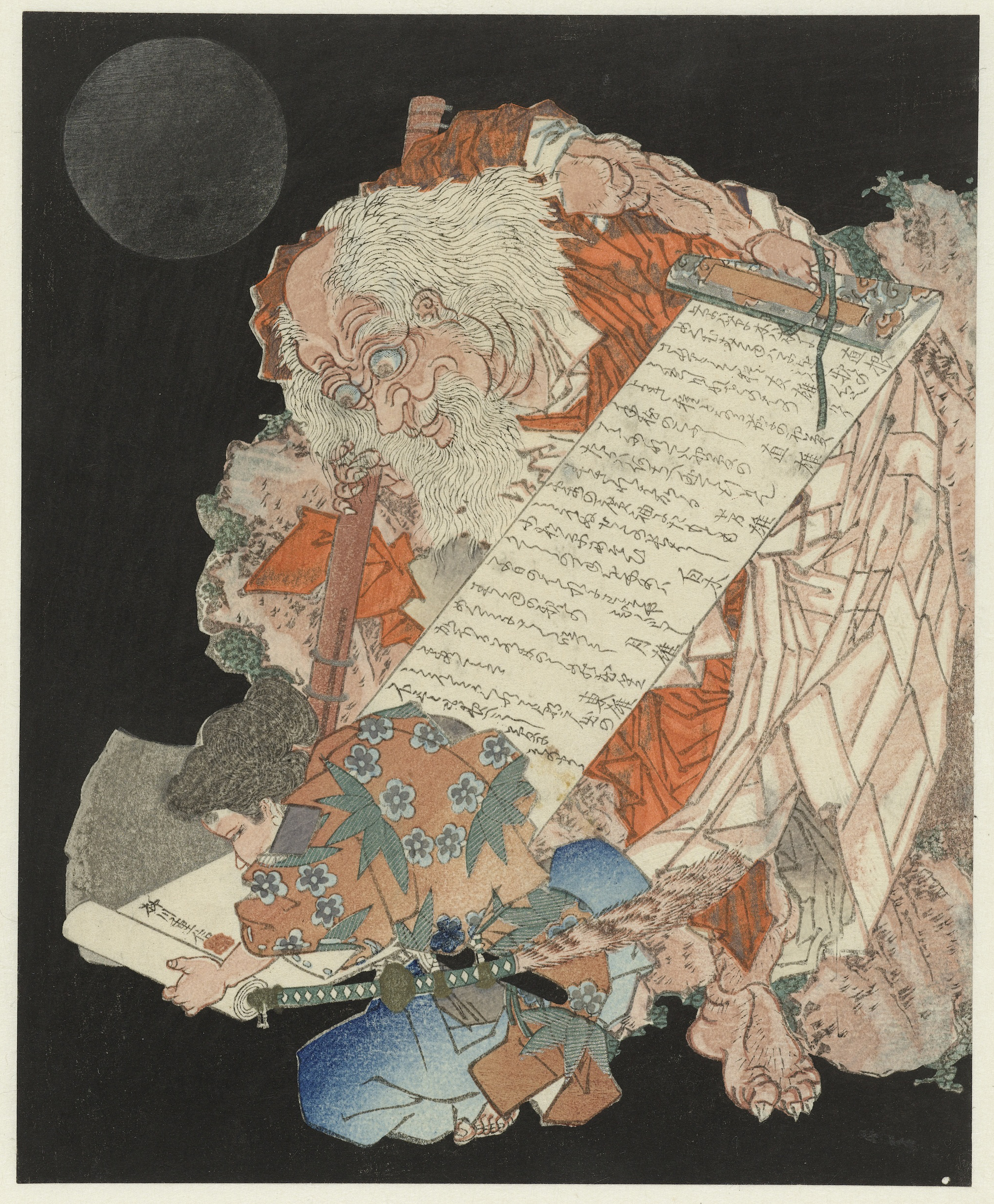
Despite his fearsome appearance and the tengu's reputation for causing trouble, Sōjōbō is portrayed as a benevolent figure.

In the tenth and eleventh centuries, de Visser says that tengu were thought to be "a mountain demon" that caused trouble in the human world. In stories from this period, tengu were portrayed as enemies of Buddhism. Later, tengu were no longer seen as enemies of Buddhism specifically, but were portrayed as wanting to "throw the whole word into disorder". According to de Visser, the reason Sōjōbō trains Yoshitsune in martial arts is to start a war.

In the Gikeiki, a text concerning the life of Yoshitsune, Sōjōgatani or Bishop's valley is described as being the location of a once popular temple that is now deserted except for tengu. According to the text, when evening approaches "there is a loud crying of spirits" and whoever visits the valley is seized by the tengu and tortured. A similar phenomenon is called kamikakushi. Kamikakushi involves the kidnapping of human beings by a supernatural entity, such as a tengu. It involves the disappearance of a child, usually a boy, followed by their return at a new and strange location and in a seemingly altered state. Cases of kamikakushi can be caused by any yōkai, but tengu are often said to be involved. Michael Foster says that the legend of the young Yoshitsune's interaction with the tengu "fits the pattern" of a kamikakushi kidnapping

In the fourteenth century, de Visser says, there is a change from all tengu being portrayed as bad to distinctions made "between good and bad tengu". Foster says that in variations of the legend of Sōjōbō and the young Yoshitsune, the tengu are portrayed as benevolent and helpful as they attempt to help the young Yoshitsune defeat the clan who killed his father.

Foster quotes dialogue from a work called Miraiki (Chronicle of the Future) to demonstrate the idea of the tengu being portrayed in a more benevolent way. After the subordinate tengu see the young Yoshitsune practising near the temple on Mount Kurama, they explain that their prideful ways prevented them from becoming Buddhas and instead caused them to become tengu. Then they say:

But even though this pride caused us to fall into this path, there is no reason we should not know pity. So let us help Ushiwaka, teach him the method of the tengu so he can attack his father’s enemy.

The portrayal of the tengu, and Sōjōbō specifically, as sympathetic to the young Yoshitsune and his desire to avenge his father, is also shown in the Noh play Kurama-tengu. In the play, the Great Tengu represents the figure of Sōjōbō. The Great Tengu says he his impressed with the Ushiwakamaru character, the young Yoshitsune, for his respectfulness and admirable intentions. Not only does he help Ushiwakamaru by training him to become a great warrior and defeat his enemies, he also promises to protect him and support him in future battles.

== Classification ==
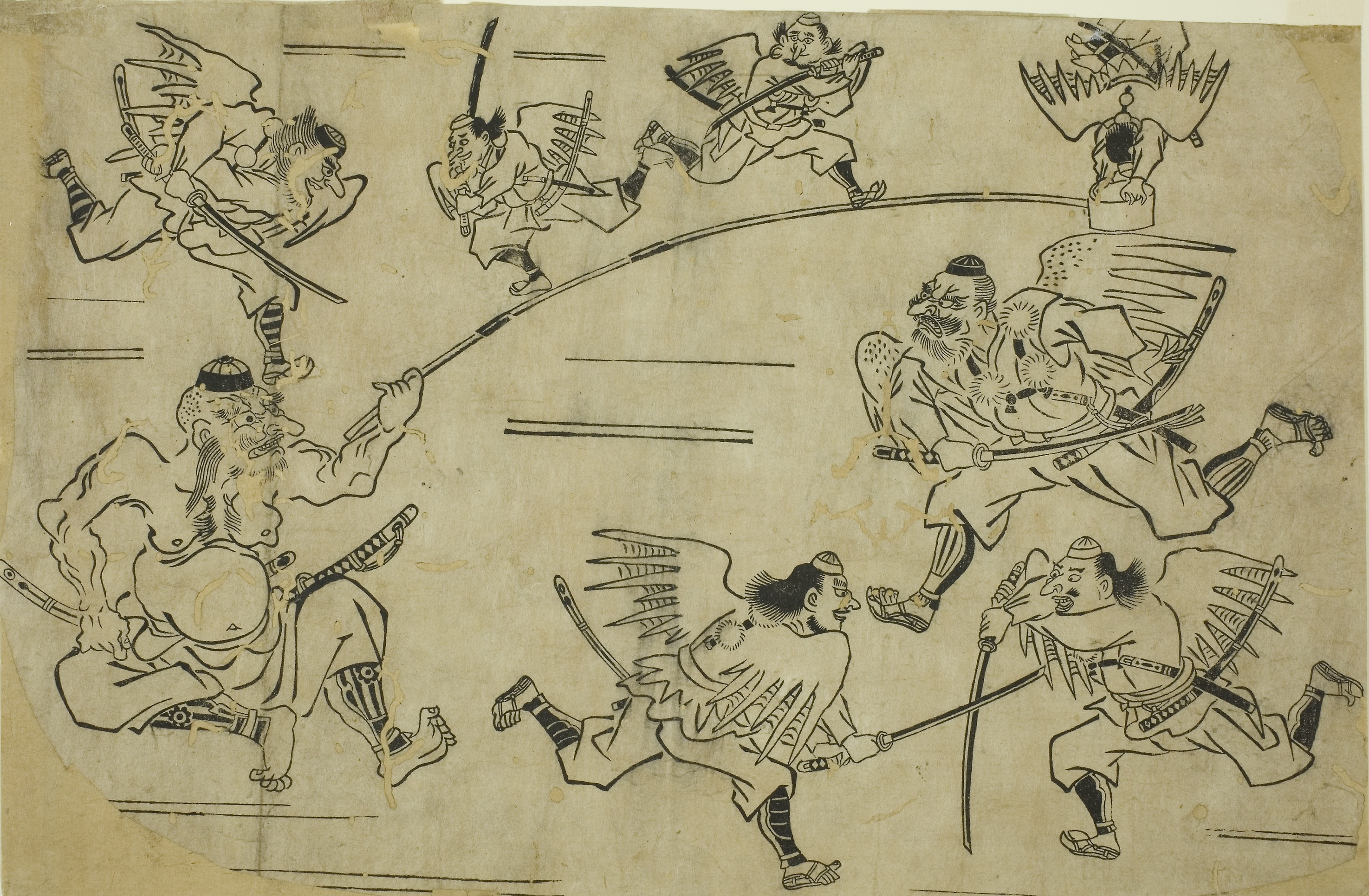
Shows the physical differences between the single figure of the more human-like daitengu and group of bird-like kotengu

Sōjōbō is a tengu, which are a type of nonhuman creature in Japanese folklore and mythology with supernatural characteristics and abilities. Tengu are also considered well-known example of yōkai. Yōkai is a term that can describe a range of different supernatural beings. According to Foster, a yōkai can be characterised in a number of ways, such as "… a weird or mysterious creature, a monster or fantastic being, a spirit or a sprit"

There are two main sub-categories or types of tengu. First, there are tengu with the primary form of a bird and second there are tengu that have the primary form of a human. Tengu of the first sub-category are generally called kotengu but can also be called karasu tengu or shōtengu. The second sub-category of tengu is called daitengu or "long-nosed tengu". As he is described as having a primarily human form, Sōjōbō belongs to the sub-category daitengu.

=== Daitengu ===
The daitengu or long nosed tengu represent a later stage in the development of the concept of tengu in Japan. According to de Visser, tengu were first in the form of a bird, then had a human form with the head of a bird, and finally the bird beak became a long nose. Similarly, Basil Hall Chamberlain says that the beak of the tengu "becomes a large and enormously long human nose, and the whole creature is conceived as human". There is no mention of the tengu having long noses in Japanese tales until after the second half of the fourteenth century. While the kotengu or bird type of tengu came first, the daitengu with the long human nose is more common in modern Japanese culture. Sōjōbō is one of the "eight great dai-tengu" and, of these, one of the three that are most well-known.

== Characteristics ==
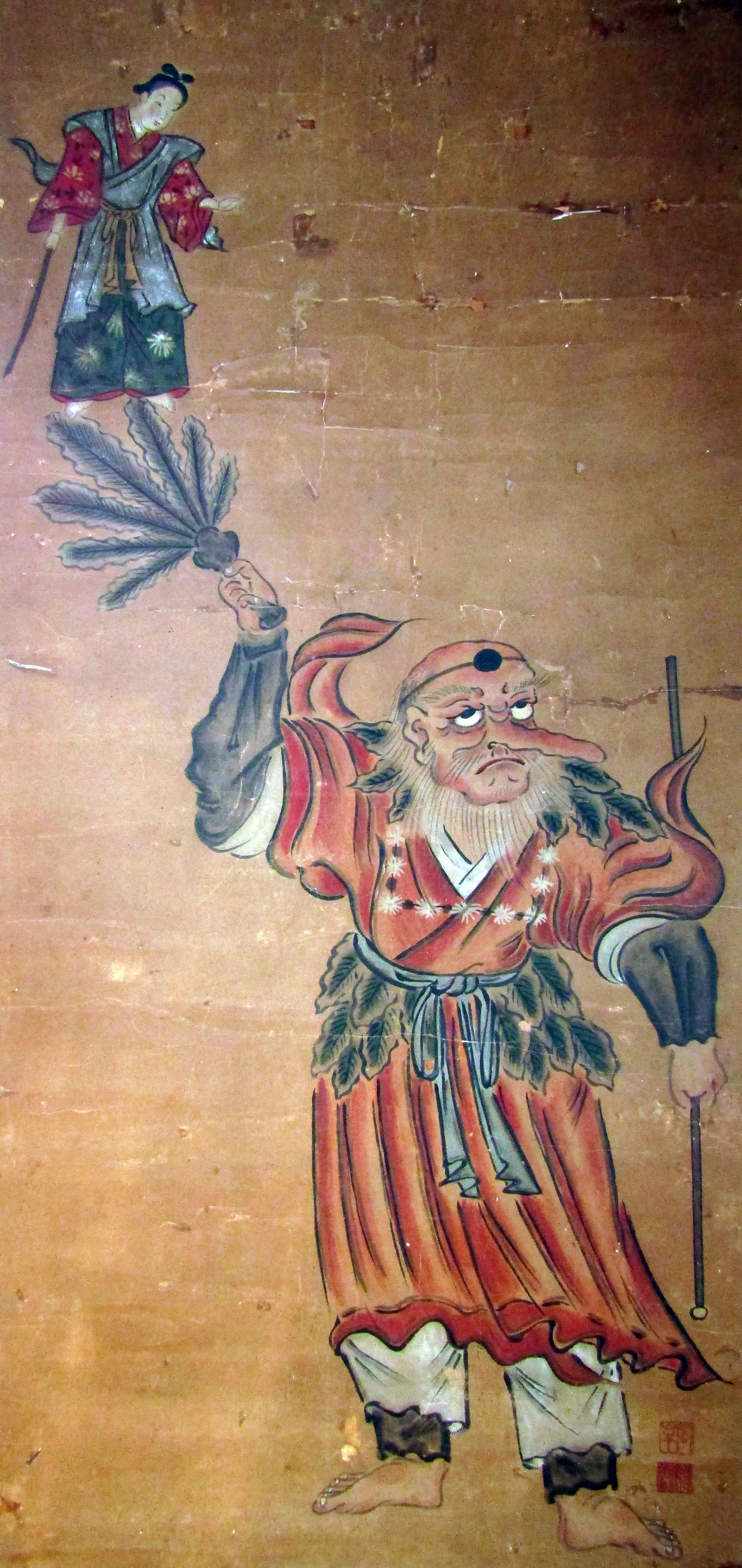
Sōjōbō wearing clothing of the yamabushi, including the tokin headdress. Other notable features depicted are his long nose and feather fan.

=== Physical appearance ===
As a daitengu, Sōjōbō has a primarily human form. Frederick Hadland Davis describes Sōjōbō as having both “bird-like claws, and feathered wings” and "a long red nose and enormous glaring eyes". Similarly, de Visser says Sōjōbō has "sparkling eyes and a big nose". Sōjōbō is also described as having a long white beard. Daitengu are described as being larger in overall size than kotengu. For example, in one legend Sōjōbō appears to be a giant from the perspective of a human.

One characteristic that both types of tengu share is their style of dress. Tengu are depicted wearing religious clothing and accessories, especially the clothing and accessories of the yamabushi. As such, Sōjōbō is often described or depicted with these items and wearing these clothes. The dress of the yamabushi includes formal robes, square-toed shoes, a sword, a scroll, a fan, and a distinctive headdress. The distinctive headdress worn by yamabushi is called a tokin. A common style of tokin, worn from the start of the Edo period, is a small hat that resembles a black box. Sōjōbō carries a fan made from seven feathers as a sign of his position at the top of tengu society. Bonnefoy says that the feather fan carried by tengu may signify the original bird-like features of the tengu Similarly, Davis says that in the development of the concept of tengu from bird-like to more human-like, “nothing bird-like” was left except for "the fan of feathers with which it fans itself".

=== Supernatural abilities ===
Another characteristic that Sōjōbō shares with yamabushi is a reputation for having supernatural abilities. Yamabushi often performed various practises in the mountains to try and attain supernatural abilities. According to folk belief, yamabushi had the abilities of flight and invisibility Tengu were thought to be able to spiritually possess human beings, similar to foxes. Other abilities attributed to tengu include invisibility, shapeshifting, flight, and the ability to tell the future. Sōjōbō is portrayed as having a reputation for being more powerful than other tengu or being a "match for a thousand"

== Roles ==
A short animation called Kobutori (The Stolen Lump). The hierarchical structure of a tengu clan can be seen by the behaviour and depiction of the different characters. Numerous smaller tengu act as subordinates to the tengu chieftain.

=== Mount Kurama chieftain ===
The daitengu subcategory of tengu is superior to the kotengu in rank. Foster says that the different types of tengu were often depicted as being in a hierarchical relationship to one another, with the daitengu "flanked by a posse" of the kotengu who are "portrayed as lieutenants" to the daitengu. The higher rank of the daitengu is also shown by the hierarchical structure on the tengu mountains.

In general, tengu of both types are thought to inhabit mountainous areas in Japan. Some individual daitengu are linked with specific mountains in Japan and are considered to be the chieftains of the other tengu on that mountain. The mountain that Sōjōbō is said to inhabit is Mount Kurama. According to Knutsen, Mount Kurama is "associated in the popular mind with the tengu". Mount Kurama is located north of the city of Kyōto in Japan. On Mount Kurama there is a famous shrine and temple called Kuramadera, which dates back to 770 AD. The mountain has connections to the history of both reiki and aikido. Mount Kurama is known as a "new-age power spot" in modern times.

Sōjōbō is considered to be the chieftain of Mount Kurama. Blomberg describes Sōjōbō as having "retainers" who "have the form of a karasu tengu". An example of the hierarchy of the two sub-categories of tengu is exhibited in the Noh play Kurama-Tengu. In the play, there are tengu characters who are described as menial and are given orders by Sōjōbō or the Great Tengu character.

=== King of the tengu ===
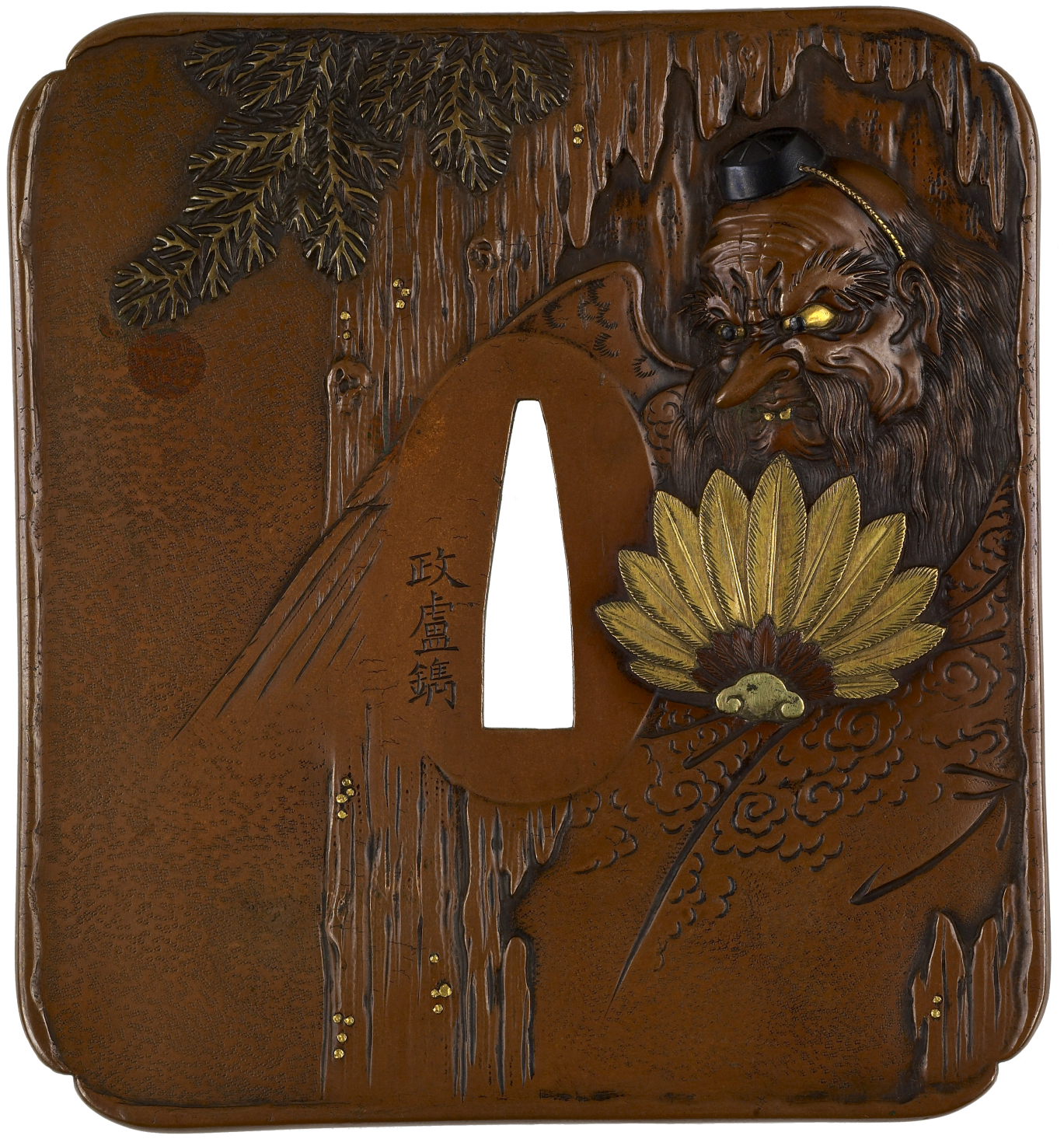
Sōjōbō and his large feather fan, which signifies his high rank

In addition to role of chieftain of Mount Kurama, Sōjōbō is considered to be the chieftain or king of all the other tengu mountains in Japan. Sōjōbō's role as king of the tengu is demonstrated in the Noh play Kurama-Tengu. In the play, the Great Tengu lists his large number of tengu servants, which are not just tengu from Mount Kurama but tengu from other areas as well. This demonstrates his authority over both the tengu on Mount Kurama and all the other tengu in Japan. This authority is also shown in a story called The Palace of the Tengu. In the story, the figure of Sōjōbō is called Great Tengu. He orders one of his tengu servants to send a message to summon the tengu chieftains of other mountains on his behalf. These tengu chieftains include "Tarōbō of Mount Atago, Jirōbō of Mount Hira, Saburōbō of Mount Kōya, Shirōbo of Mount Nachi, and Buzenbō of Mount Kannokura".

Sōjōbō is specifically associated with a place on Mount Kurama called Sōjōgatani or Bishop's valley. According to de Benneville, this area was thought to be "the haunt of tengu, even … the seat of the court of their goblin-king". Similarly, de Visser says that some tengu live in “brilliant palaces” and Sōjōbō or the "Great Tengu" was "the Lord of such a palace". Sōjōbō's tengu palace features in the story The Palace of the Tengu. A character in this story, Minamoto no Yoshitsune, reaches the tengu palace by starting at the bottom of the slope of the temple on Mount Kurama, climbing a path up the mountainside until he reaches coloured walls that lead him to the gates of the palace. He finds the palace to be very large, elaborate, and decorated with different jewels. According to the story, the palace contains "hundreds of tengu".

== Appearances ==
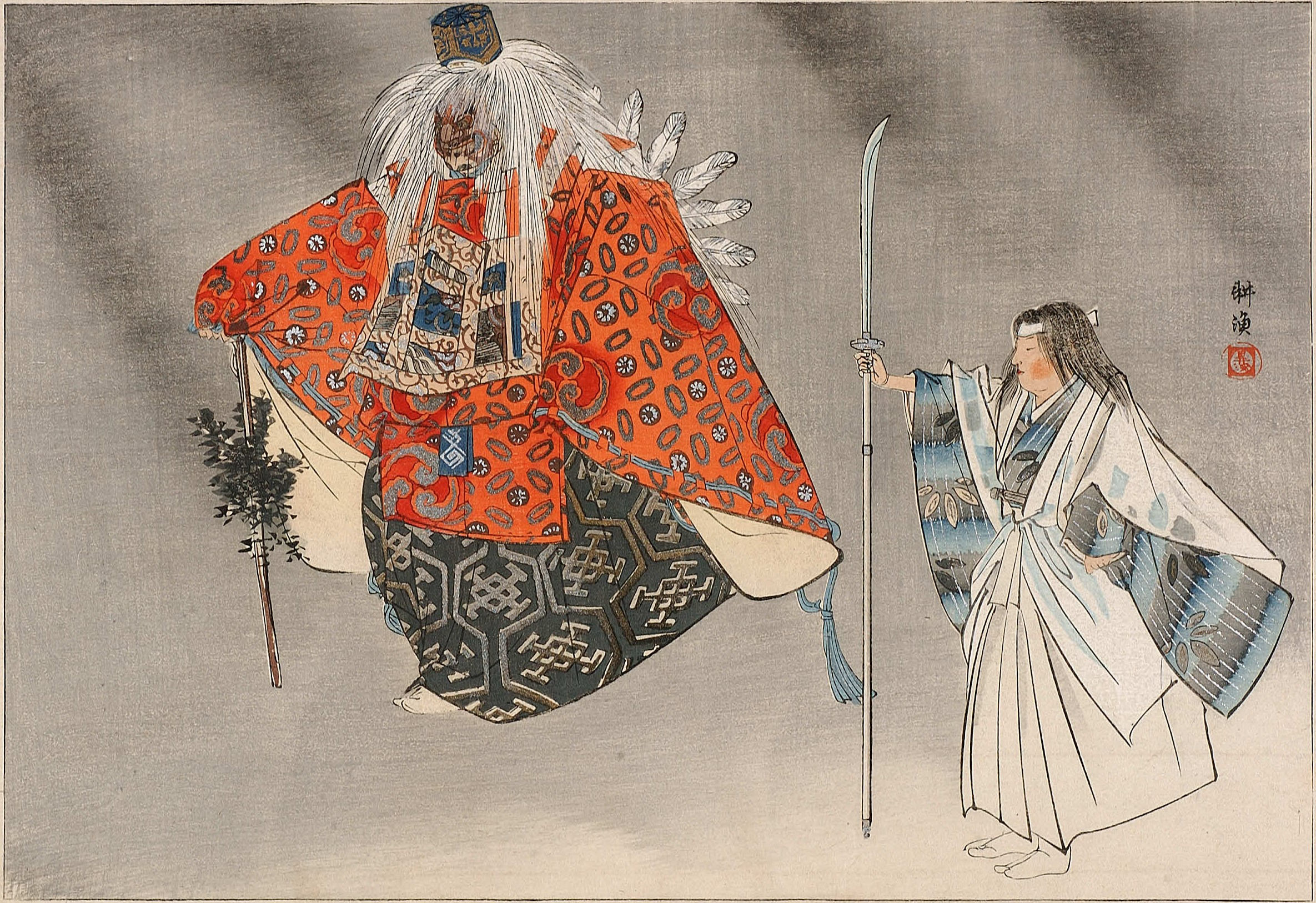
Depiction of a scene from Kurama-tengu that shows the elaborate costume of the Great Tengu character.

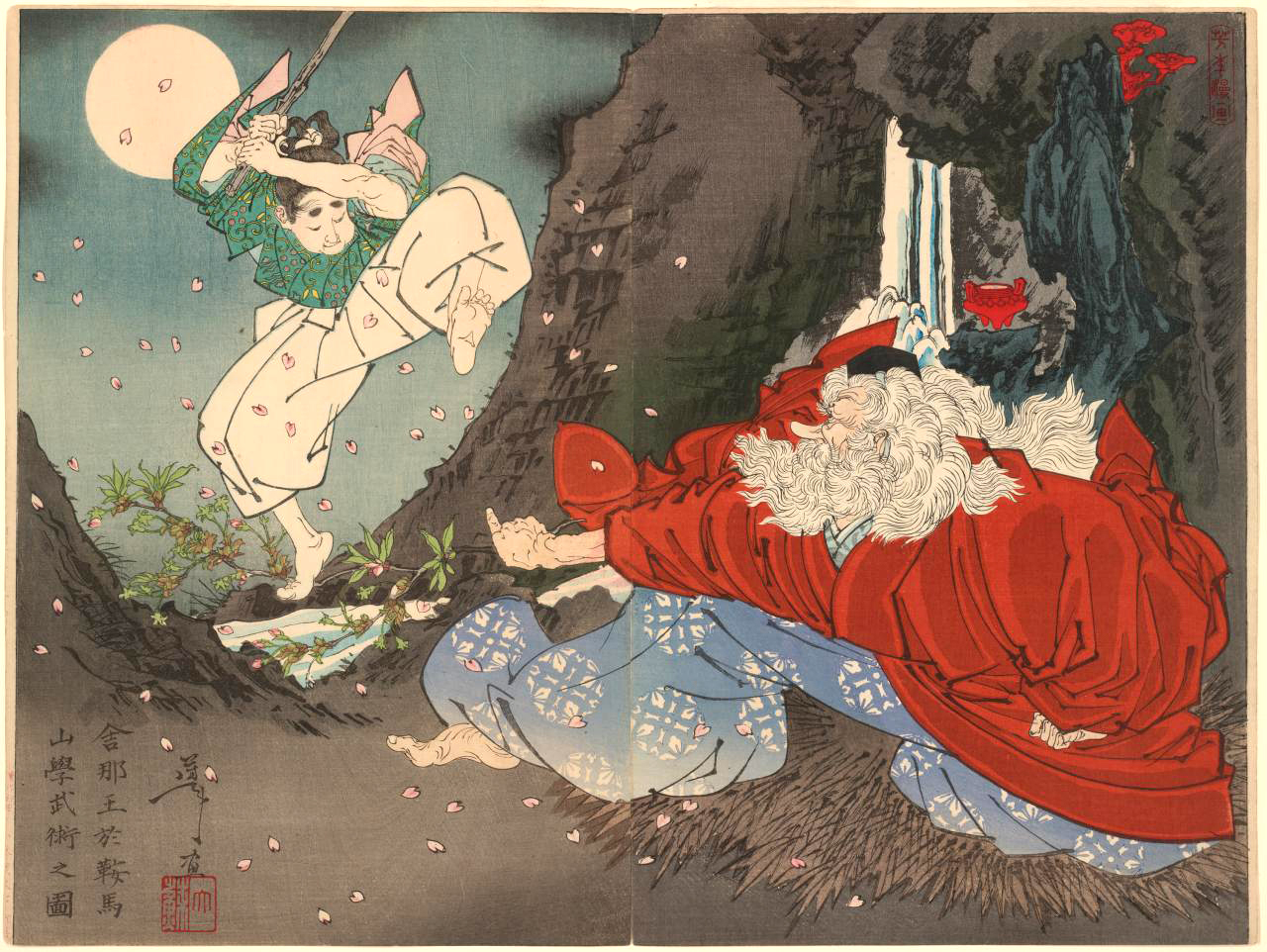
Tsukioka Yoshitoshi,The king of the Tengus teaching martial arts to Yoshitsune. 1886. 35.5 × 46.7 cm. Colour woodblock. National Gallery of Victoria, Melbourne.

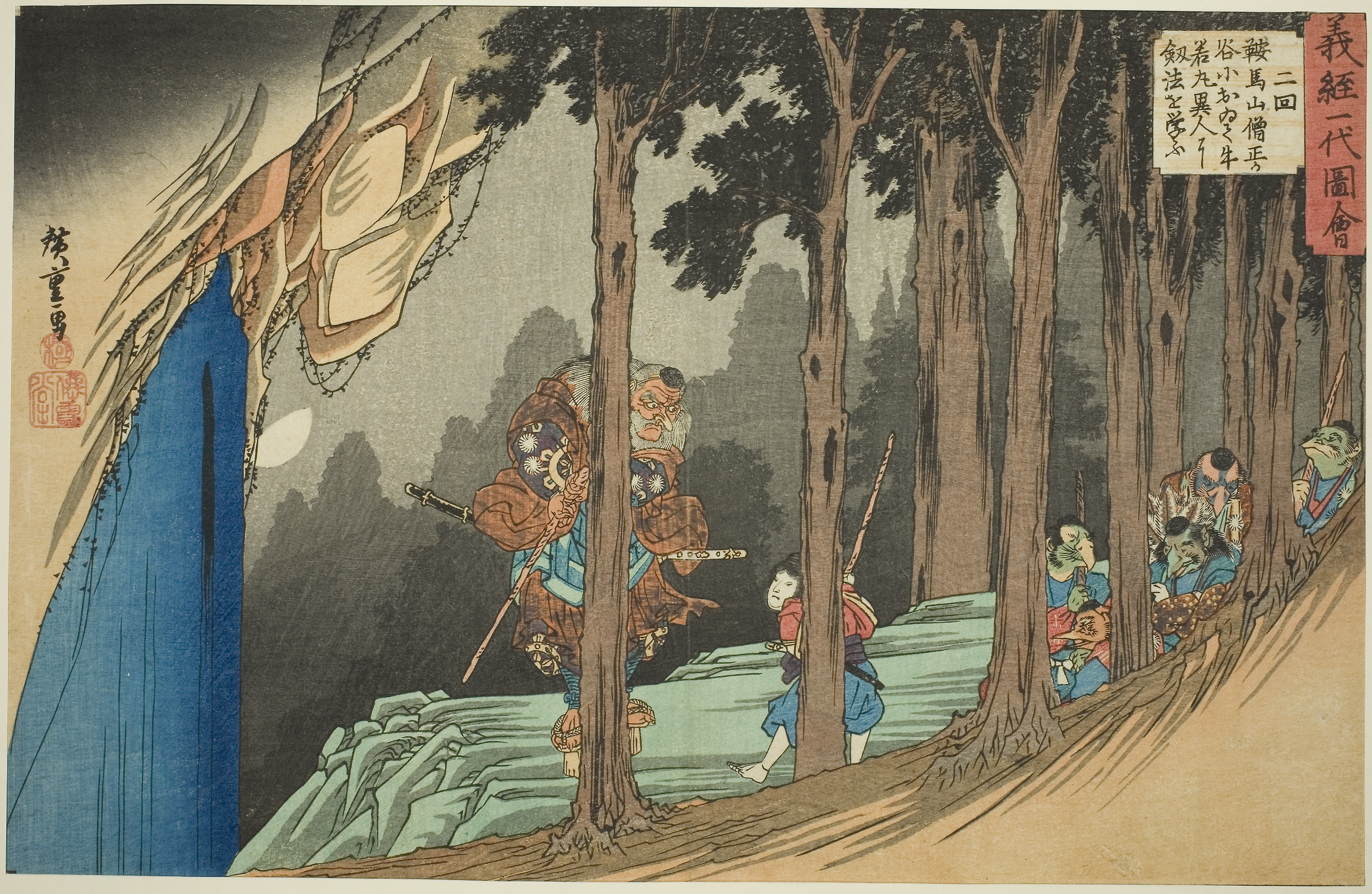
Utagawa Hiroshige, No. 2: Ushiwakamaru Learns Swordsplay from the Tengu at Sojogatani on Mount Kurama.1832/34. 24 x 35.9 cm. Colour woodblock. Clarence Buckingham Collection, Art Institute of Chicago.

=== In performing arts ===
The Noh play Kurama-Tengu features an interpretation of the legend about Sōjōbō and Yoshitsune. Noh (能, nō; "skills or artistry") is a genre of traditional Japanese theatre. Shinko Kagaya and Hiroko Miura say Noh is comparable to opera because of its focus on dance and music.

In Kurama-Tengu, Sōjōbō is initially disguised as a mountain priest and befriends the young Yoshitsune (called Ushiwakamaru at this age) at a celebration of the cherry blossoms on Mount Kurama. Then the following exchange between the two characters occurs:

USHIWAKAMURU. By the way, you, the gentleman who comforts me, who

are you? Please give me your name.

MOUNTAIN PRIEST. There is nothing to hide now, I am the Great Tengu of

Mount Kurama, who has lived in this mountain for hundreds of years.

— Kurama-tengu (Long-nosed Goblin in Kurama)

After his true identity is revealed, the Great Tengu says he will “hand down the secret of the art of war” to Ushiwakamaru. The Great Tengu instructs the menial tengu to practice with Ushiwakamaru. Ushiwakamaru then becomes extremely skilled, as demonstrated by the words of the reciters who say that "even the monsters in the heavens and the demons in the underworld will be unable to beat his elegance with braveness". The play ends with the Great Tengu predicting that Ushiwakamaru will defeat his enemies and avenge his father. He then promises to protect Ushiwakamaru before disappearing into the trees of Mount Kurama.

The legend of Yoshitsune learning martial arts from the tengu is also featured in another genre of Japanese drama called kōwakamai. The main element of kōwakamai is performance, but the texts associated with the performances are also significant to the genre. The kōwakamai work featuring the legend is called Miraiki (Chronicle of the Future). This work has a similar plot to the literary work Tengu no dairi (The Palace of the Tengu).

=== In literary arts ===
An example from the literary arts of the legend of Sōjōbō and Yoshitsune is the otogi-zōshi story called Tengu no dairi (The Palace of the Tengu). Otogi-zōshi is a genre of Japanese fiction that was prominent in the fourteenth century and up to seventeenth century. Sōjōbō also independently features in an otogi-zōshi story called The Tale of the Handcart Priest.

In Tengu no dairi (The Palace of the Tengu), a young Yoshitsune seeks out and visits the palace of the tengu. He meets the Great Tengu and his wife, who tell him that his father "has been reborn as Dainichi Buddha in the Pure Land of Amida". The story then covers the supernatural journey of the Great Tengu and the young Yoshitsune through the "six planes of karmic transmigration" to visit Yoshitsune's father in the Pure Land.

Sōjōbō is not the protagonist of the story The Tale of the Handcart Priest but is mentioned when a group of tengu notice his absence from their gathering. They were gathering to conspire against the character the Handcart Priest and were in need of Sōjōbō's help. A messenger is sent to Sōjōbō to ask for his help, and he tells the messenger that he doesn't want to take part because he has been nearly fatally wounded by the Handcart Priest and "may not survive". The other tengu say that they will never succeed without the aid of Sōjōbō and that the Handcart Priest must be remarkable if he was able to wound "the likes of our Sōjōbō".

=== In visual arts ===
The legendary relationship between Sōjōbō as instructor and the young Yoshitsune as student serves as the basis of many Japanese woodblock prints. Many of these works were created by artists known for their work in the ukiyo-e genre. Some of these artists include Tsukioka Yoshitoshi, Utagawa Hiroshige, Kawanabe Kyōsai, Utagawa Kuniyoshi, Utagawa Kunisada, and Keisai Eisen.

== Related figures ==
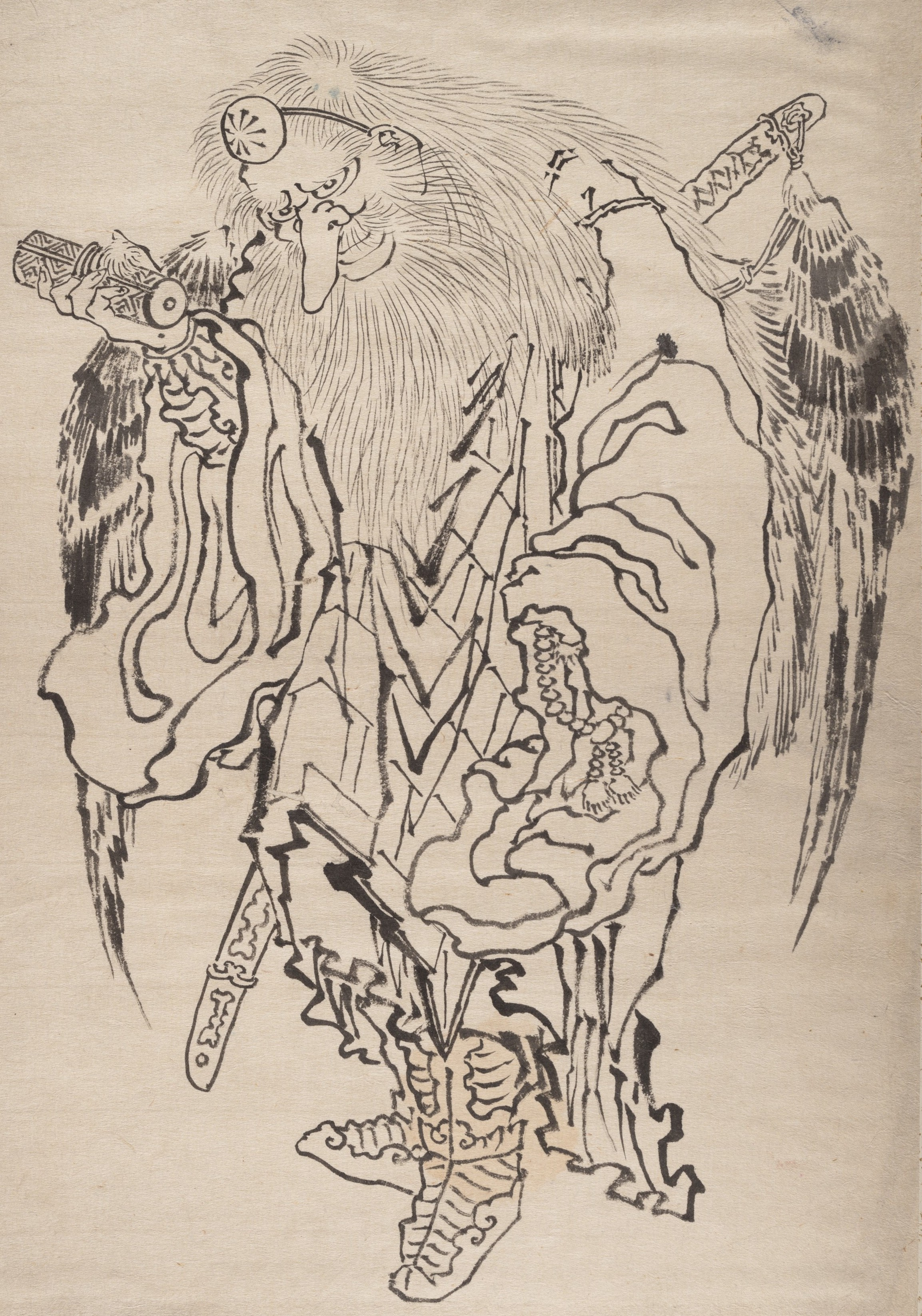
Sōjōbō

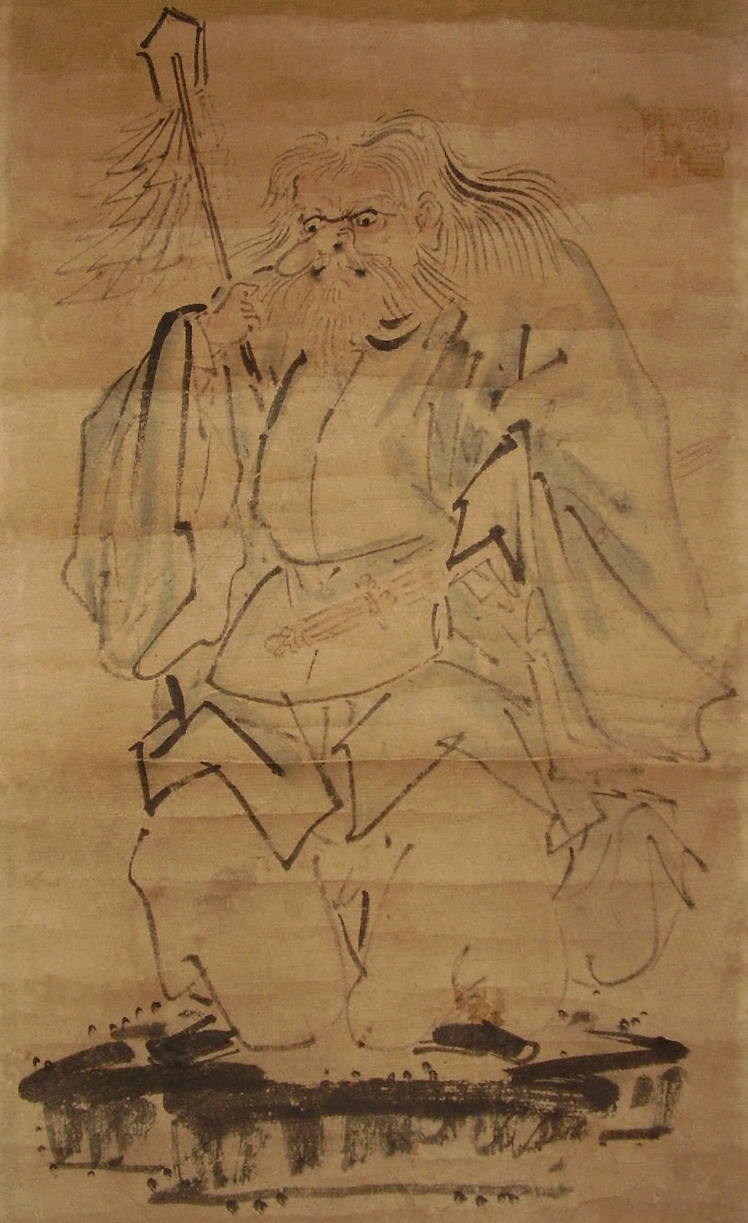
Sarutahiko

Related figures to Sōjōbō include the other two famous tengu, Zegaibō of China and Tarōbō of Mount Atago. Like Sōjōbō, these tengu are daitengu, chieftains of a tengu mountain, and appear in different forms of Japanese art. Kimbrough says that in one version of the Heike monogatari, the tengu Tarōbō is described as the greatest tengu in Japan. In the text Gempei Seisuiki, Tarōbō is described as the first of the great tengu.

Sōjōbō is also depicted with a similar appearance to other types of supernatural entities. After looking at a drawing of Yoshitsune with a long-nosed tengu, Osman Edwards says that the tengu "has many characteristics in common with the Scandinavian trold". In Scandinavian folklore, the troll is a legendary monster that, like the tengu, dwells in mountains and forests. Secondly, Sōjōbō and daitengu in general are depicted in a similar way to a kami or Shinto deity called Sarutahiko. Ashkenazi says descriptions of Sarutahiko present him as being very tall, having an extremely long nose, and with "mirror-like eyes" that "shone cherry-red from inner flames".

== Modern legacy ==
One modern legacy of Sōjōbō is his representation in Japanese festivals. According to F. Brinkley, entities from the "region of allegory" are honoured at these festivals alongside deities. At some festivals, decorated shrines devoted to a particular deity or subject are mounted on a wooden cart called a dashi and are carried down the streets in a procession as part of the festival's celebrations. At the festival of Sanno in Tokyo, there is a dashi dedicated to Ushiwaka and Sōjōbō. Brinkley says that it was common for the people attending to festival to know the history surrounding each dashi and its subject.

The influence of Sōjōbō is also present in popular culture. Tengu have become a common subject in different forms Japanese media including film, video games, manga, and anime. One early example is the novel series Kurama Tengu authored by Jiro Osaragi, a series of stories about a covert warrior who assumes the titular title as his vigilante persona.

== See also ==
- Buddhism in Japan
- Eboshi-ori
- Kiichi Hōgen
- Japanese martial arts
- Sacred mountains
- Woodblock printing in Japan

== Works cited ==
- Absolon, Trevor; Thatcher, David (2011). The Watanabe Art Museum Samurai Armour Collection: Volume I ~ Kabuto & Mengu. Toraba. ISBN 978-0-9867615-0-8.
- Ashkenazi, Michael (2003). Handbook of Japanese Mythology. ABC-CLIO. ISBN 1-57607-467-6.
- Bann, Jenny (2016). "Troll". In Weinstock, Jeffrey Andrew (ed.). The Ashgate Encyclopedia of Literary and Cinematic Monsters. Routledge. doi:10.4324/9781315612690. ISBN 9781409425625.
- Blomberg, Catharina (1994). The Heart of the Warrior: Origins and Religious Background of the Samurai System in Feudal Japan. Routledge. ISBN 1873410069.
- Bonnefoy, Yves; Doniger, Wendy, eds. (1993). Asian Mythologies. University of Chicago Press. ISBN 0226064565.
- Brinkley, Captain F. (1910). Japan, Its History, Arts and Literature. Oriental series. Vol. 6. J. B. Millet Company. hdl:2027/nyp.33433082124169.
- Buswell, Robert E. Jr.; Lopez, Donald S. Jr. (2017). The Princeton Dictionary of Buddhism. Princeton University Press. ISBN 9780691157863.
- Cali, Joseph; Dougill, John (November 2012). Shinto Shrines: A Guide to the Sacred Sites of Japan's Ancient Religion. University of Hawai'i Press. ISBN 9780824837136.
- Chamberlain, Basil Hall (1905). Things Japanese: Being notes on various subjects connected with Japan for the use of travellers and others (5th, revised ed.). London: Kelly & Walsh, Ltd.
- Davis, F. Hadland (1912). Myths & Legends of Japan. New York: Thomas Y. Crowell Company. hdl:2027/uc1.$b233536.
- de Benneville, James Seguin (1910). Saitō Musashi-Bō Benkei (Tales of the Wars of the Gempei): Being the Story of the Lives and Adventures of Iyo-No-Kami Minamoto Kuro Yoshitsune and Saitō Musashi-Bō Benkei the Warrior Monk. Vol. 1. Yokohama: James Seguin de Benneville.
- de Visser, M. W. (1908). The Tengu. Transactions of the Asiatic Society of Japan. Tokyo: Asiatic Society of Japan. hdl:2027/coo.31924066003868.
- Edwards, Osman (1901). Japanese Plays and Playfellows. New York: John Lane.
- Foster, Michael Dylan (January 2015). The Book of Yokai: Mysterious Creatures of Japanese folklore. University of California Press. ISBN 9780520271029.
- Griffis, William Elliot (1880). Japanese Fairy World: Stories from the Wonder-Lore of Japan. Schenectady, New York: J. H. Barhyte. hdl:2027/uc1.$b292831.
- Kagaya, Shinko; Miura, Hiroko (August 2016). "Noh and Muromachi Culture". In Salz, Jonah (ed.). A History of Japanese Theatre. Cambridge University Press. ISBN 9781107034242.
- Kimbrough, R. Keller (2012). "The Tale of the Handcart Priest". Japanese Journal of Religious Studies. 39 (2). Nagoya: Nanzan Institute for Religion and Culture: 1–7. ProQuest 1285490921.
- Kimbrough, R. Keller (March 2016) [2015]. "Late Medieval Popular Fiction and Narrated Genres: Otogizōshi, Kōwakamai, Sekkyō, and Ko-Jōruri". In Shirane, Haruo; Suzuki, Tomi; Lurie, David (eds.). The Cambridge History of Japanese Literature. Cambridge University Press. pp. 355–370. doi:10.1017/CHO9781139245869. ISBN 9781107029033.
- Kimbrough, R. Keller (2016). "Tengu". In Weinstock, Jeffrey Andrew (ed.). The Ashgate Encyclopedia of Literary and Cinematic Monsters. Routledge. doi:10.4324/9781315612690. ISBN 9781409425625.
- Kimbrough, Keller; Shirane, Haruo, eds. (February 2018). Monsters, Animals, and Other Worlds: A Collection of Short Medieval Japanese Tales. Columbia University Press. ISBN 9780231184465.
- Knutsen, Ronald (August 2011). Tengu: The Shamanic and Esoteric Origins of the Japanese Martial Arts. Global Oriental. ISBN 9781906876227.
- Salz, Jonah (February 2016). "Traditional Japanese theatre". In Liu, Siyuan (ed.). Routledge Handbook of Asian Theatre. Routledge. doi:10.4324/9781315641058. ISBN 9780415821551. S2CID 163598895.
- "Kurama-tengu (Long-nosed Goblin in Kurama)". the-NOH.com.
- unknown (1560–1600). Digitised Manuscripts 天狗の内裏 [Tengu no Dairi] (in Japanese).
