= Yoshitsune =

Yoshitsune may refer to:

- Minamoto no Yoshitsune (1159–1189)
  - Gikeiki, a Japanese chronicle, sometimes known in English by Helen Craig McCullough's translated title Yoshitsune
  - Yoshitsune (TV series), a 2005 Japanese television drama series
- Kujō Yoshitsune (1169–1206)
- Takuya Sugi (born 1983), Japanese professional wrestler better known as Yoshitsune
- Yoshitsune, a character in manga/anime Air Gear
