= Okina =

Okina may refer to:

- ʻOkina, a letter in the Hawaiian alphabet
- Okina (翁^{?}) or Kashiwazaki Nenji (柏崎 念至), a character from the Rurouni Kenshin manga series
- Okina Matara, a fictional character in Hidden Star in Four Seasons from the video game franchise Touhou Project
- Okina, Spain, a village in the Basque Country
- Okina (Noh) (翁), a particular Japanese Noh, combining play/dance with Shinto ritual
- Okina (翁), a Japanese satellite of the lunar orbiter SELENE (better known in Japan by its nickname Kaguya, かぐや)
