= Kumasaka =

Kumasaka (The Robber) is a Noh play from the 15th century. Arthur Waley attributes it to Zenchiku Ujinobu and it concerns the notable Heian period bandit Kumasaka no Chohan.

The play takes the form of a dream-time Mugen Noh.

== Legendary background ==
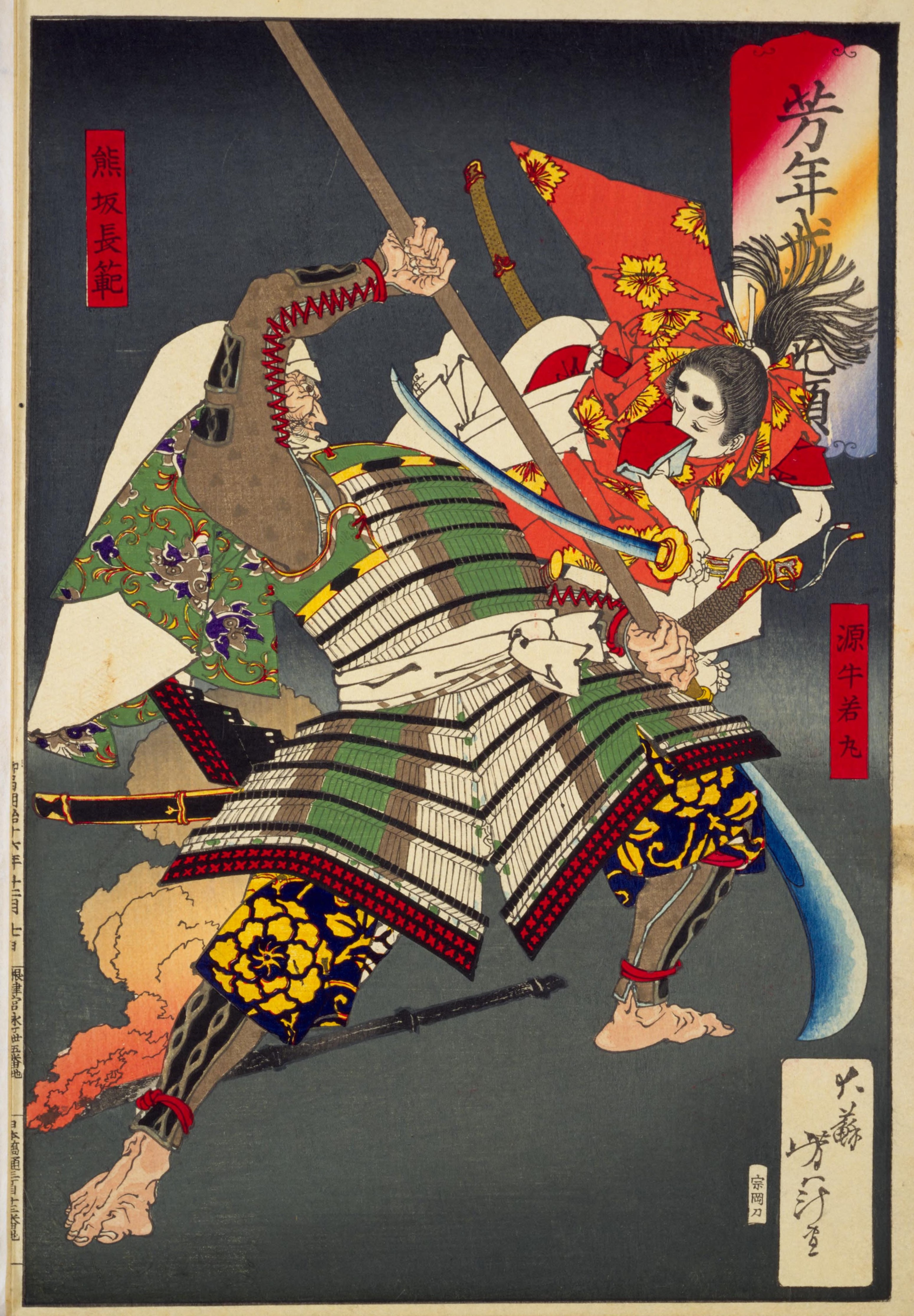
The fight between Ushiwakamaru (Minamoto no Yoshitune) and the bandit chief Kumasaka Chohan in 1174. Ukiyo-e printed by Tsukioka Yoshitoshi. Warriors Trembling with Courage .

The samurai hero, Minamoto no Yoshitsune (known in his early life as Ushiwaka) had a series of encounters attributed to him in his youth, one of which concerned repelling a bandit attack led by Kumasaka. Kumasaka is sometimes identified as the slayer of Yoshitsune's mother.

== Plot ==
A travelling monk is offered shelter by another, on condition that he prays for an anonymous soul buried by a pine tree. The traveler is surprised to see a large pike hanging on the cottage wall, and the other reveals his past as a robber before vanishing. This reveals to the priest that "It was under the shadow of a pine-tree that he had rested".

Thereafter, the robber reappears as the ghost of Kumasaka and recounts the story of his last fight and his death at the hands of Ushiwaka: "The wonderful boy...be he ogre or hobgoblin".

== Literary associations ==
- The play has been interpreted as a retrospective telling of the last part of the genzai-mono play, Eboshi-ori.
- Basho referenced the pine tree associated with Kumasaka in a renga: "a pine in memory/of a bandit/broken by the wind".

== See also ==
- Benkei on the Bridge
- El Cid
