= Benkei on the Bridge =

Noh play

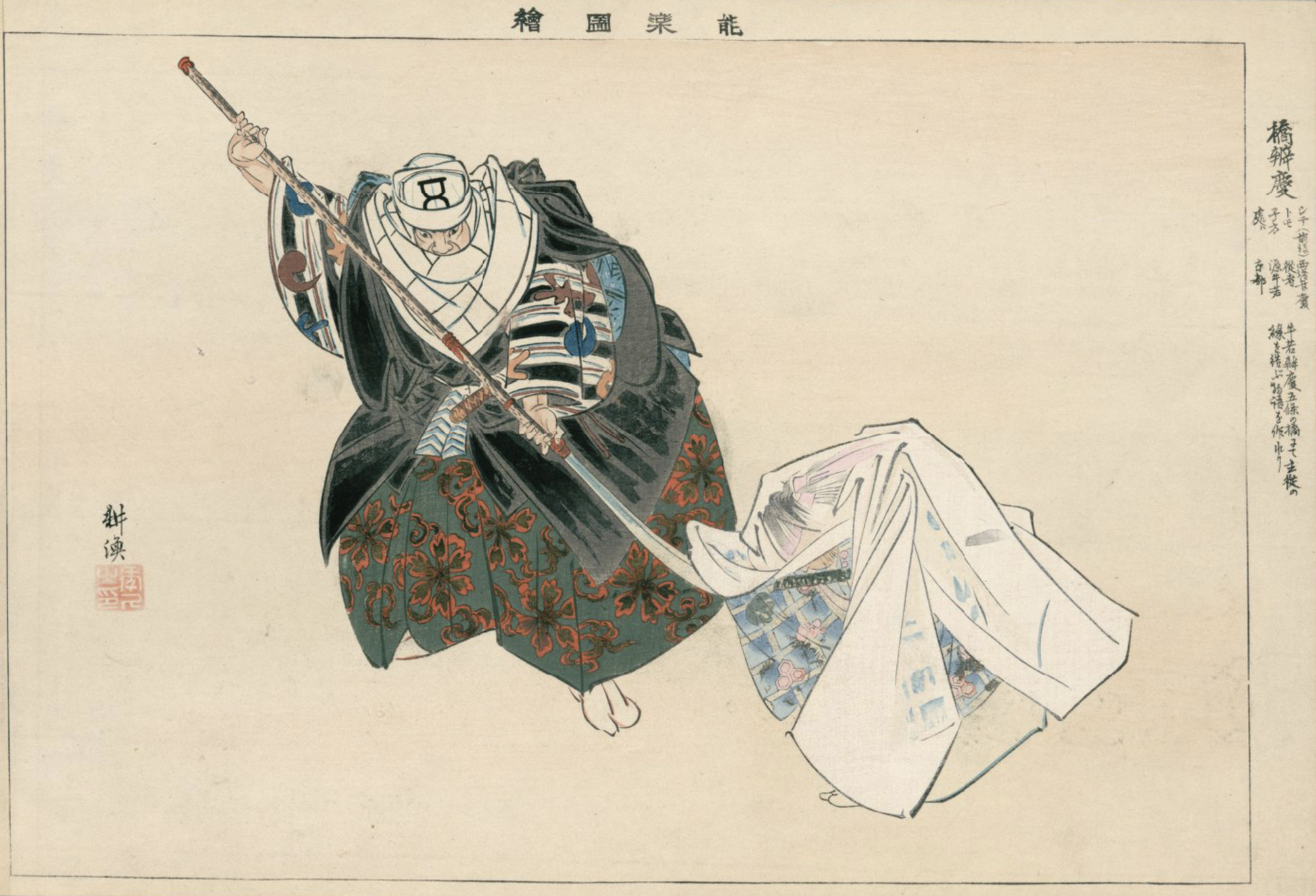
Benkei and Yoshitsune, in disguise, meet on Gojō Bridge, a scene from Hashi Benkei; woodblock print by Kōgyo Tsukioka from the series Nōgaku zue or Pictures of Noh Plays

Benkei on the Bridge (橋弁慶, Hashi Benkei) is a Japanese Noh play from the 15th century, by Hiyoshi Sa-ami Yasukiyo.

== Theme ==
The play centres around the encounter between the giant warrior monk Benkei and the youthful Minamoto no Yoshitsune, in which the slighter and younger man defeated the elder. The hand-to-hand bridge combat forged a lasting bond between the pair. Thereafter Benkei served as Yoshitsune’s second in command - as what Basho would describe as “his faithful retainer, Benkei”.

== Later developments ==
Buson created a haiku and a haiku painting, Benkei and Young Bull, around the themes of the play, quoting from it in his haiku:

Snow, moon, and blossoms -
And then a pledge for three lives,
Faith and loyalty

== See also ==
- Eboshi-ori
- Funa Benkei
- Kumasaka
- Little John
