= Funa Benkei =

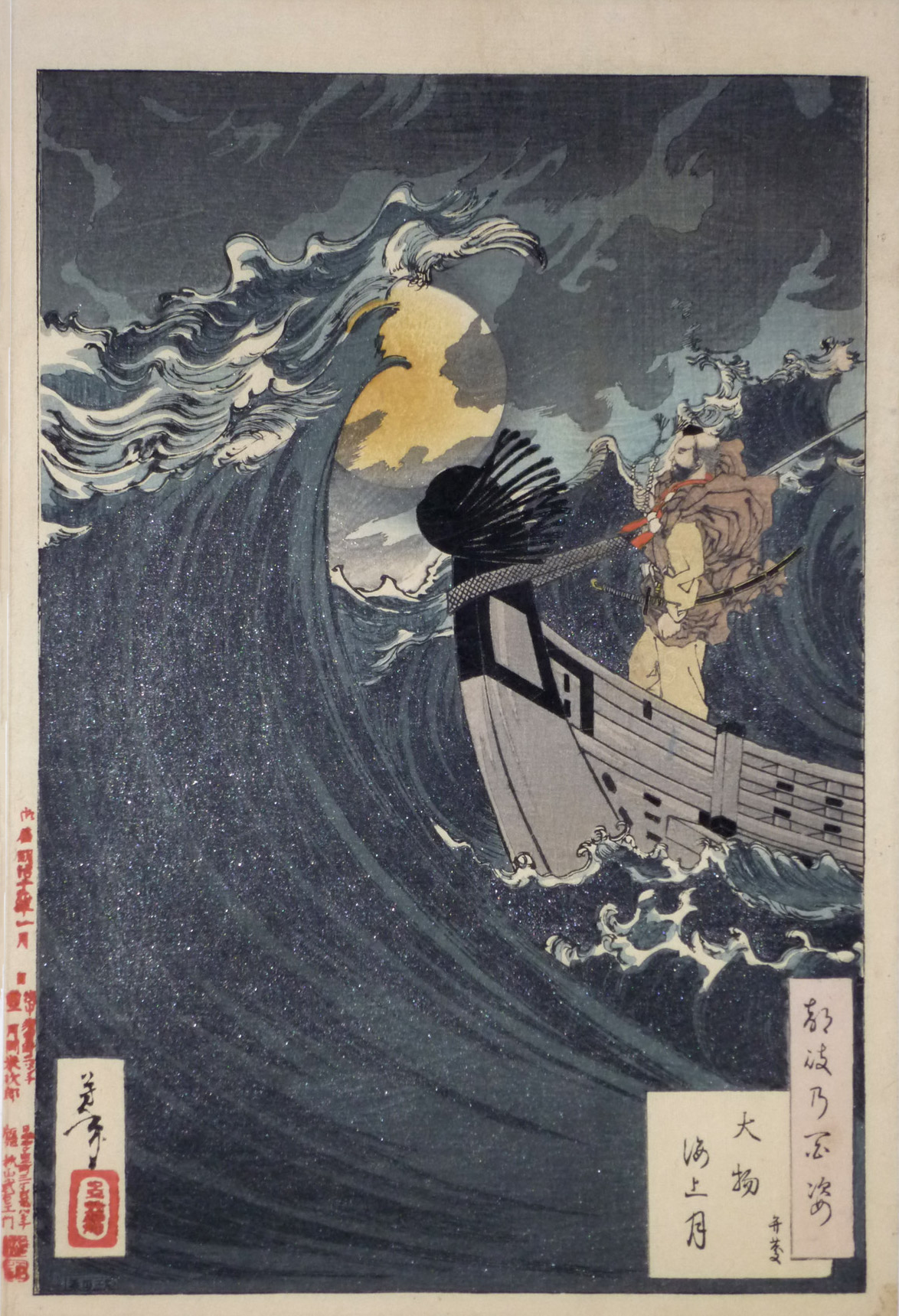
Funa Benkei, by Yoshitoshi

Funa Benkei (船弁慶; Japanese pronunciation: [ɸɯ.na.beꜜŋ.kei, -keː]) is a Japanese Noh play written by Kanze Kojirô Nobumitsu, eventually adapted to Kabuki by Kawatake Mokuami in 1885. It was staged for the first time in November that year and starred Ichikawa Danjūrō IX.

The play is set in the period of Minamoto no Yoshitsune’s downfall, when his elder brother Minamoto no Yoritomo, seeing Yoshitsune as a rival power, excludes him from the royal family despite his loyal performance in battle.

Yoshitsune decides to escape and meet up with his retainer Benkei at Daimotsu no Ura port. While at a hotel en route, his girlfriend Shizuka dances for him, and her headdress falls off during the dance. It is a bad omen, so she leaves, and returns to Kyoto.

Yoshitsune continues his journey the next day and boards the boat, where they are struck by a dangerous storm. During the storm they are attacked by ghosts of the sea, among them Taira no Tomomori. They fight the spirits, but to no avail. Eventually, Benkei realises that the only way to defeat a vengeful spirit is through prayer, and in a cathartic sequence the storm dissipates as his prayers dispel the still pursuing spirits: “Then on the tide they drift away/ Leaving no trace upon the foaming wave”.

== Style ==
- Yoshitsune is (as always) played by preference by a child actor.
- The flamboyance of the Noh play is seen as a move away from the traditional idea of Yugen, or muted and graceful beauty, in favor of something more expansive.

== See also ==
- Benkei on the Bridge
