= Okina (Noh) =

Noh play

Okina (翁) is a ritual performed as a noh play. Okina is unique in the noh repertoire and has it own category outside of the five categories of noh plays. Because of its unique ritualistic characteristics, it is said to be “noh, yet not noh” (noh ni shite, noh ni arazu).

Unlike other noh plays, Okina has no storyline. The character of the old man Okina appears and prays for peace and tranquility throughout the world with the chant “tenga taihei kokudo annon” (the world at peace, the land safe and tranquil). Okina remains highly enigmatic, in particular as the meaning of several of the lyrics remains unclear.

== History ==
Okina is said to have been in existence in the tenth century, and its history is thus certainly much older than any other noh. Throughout its history it has had a religious significance, which still exists today, with words and dances designed to win the help of the gods in obtaining peace and prosperity in the land and long life for its people.

Okina was previously known as shiki-sanban. In Edo period (1603–1868), full performances of noh (goban-date) would feature a play for each of the five categories of noh plays, starting with Okina, followed by a first category play, second category, and so on. While such programs are rare today, Okina is always performed at the beginning if it is presented.

== Plot ==
The characters that appear in Okina are Menbako-mochi, Senzai, Okina, and Sanbasō.

The performance consists of four main parts:

1. Sung part by Okina and chorus
2. Dance by Senzai
3. Dance by Okina
4. Dance by Sanbasō (first part unmasked, second part with mask and bells)

Menbako-mochi (a mask box bearer) carries the mask box on stage, holding it reverently. The role is performed by a kyogen actor. In the box, there are two masks: hakushiki-jo (white old man) and kokushiki-jo (black old man), as well as the bell tree (suzu), which will be used by the Sanbasō character.

The role of Senzai is performed by a young actor. Senzai dances the high-spirited senzai-no-mai (the Senzai dance).

The role of Okina is the lead character in the first half of the piece. The actor who performs it is said to become Okina after putting on the mask (hakushiki-jo), which he puts on stage. There is no other play in the Noh repertoire in which a mask is put in place after the actor has appeared on the stage.

Sanbasō is the main character of the second half of Okina. Sanbasō is performed by a kyogen actor. After Okina departs at the end of the first half, the Sanbasō actor (without wearing a mask) dances the momi-no-dan. After that, the actor puts on the black Okina mask, and with a bell tree in hand, dances the suzu-no-dan (bell section).

== Performance ==
Okina is performed at times of special celebration or commemoration, such as New Year, memorial performances, and dedication services. When it is performed, it is always performed first and the part of Okina is usually played by the head of the school (iemoto). Before the players come on to the stage, a ceremony of purification is performed in the dressing room. Okina is performed by all five schools of noh.

== See also ==
- List of Noh plays
- Noh
