= Mount Kurama =

Mountain in Kyoto Prefecture, Japan

- Location within Japan

Highest point
- Elevation: 584 m (1,916 ft)
- Prominence: 44 m (144 ft)
- Listing: List of mountains and hills of Japan by height
- Coordinates: 35°7′26″N 135°46′17″E

Naming
- Native name: 鞍馬山 (Japanese)

Geography
- Location: Kyoto, Japan
- Topo map(s): Geographical Survey Institute 25000:1 大原, 50000:1 京都及大阪

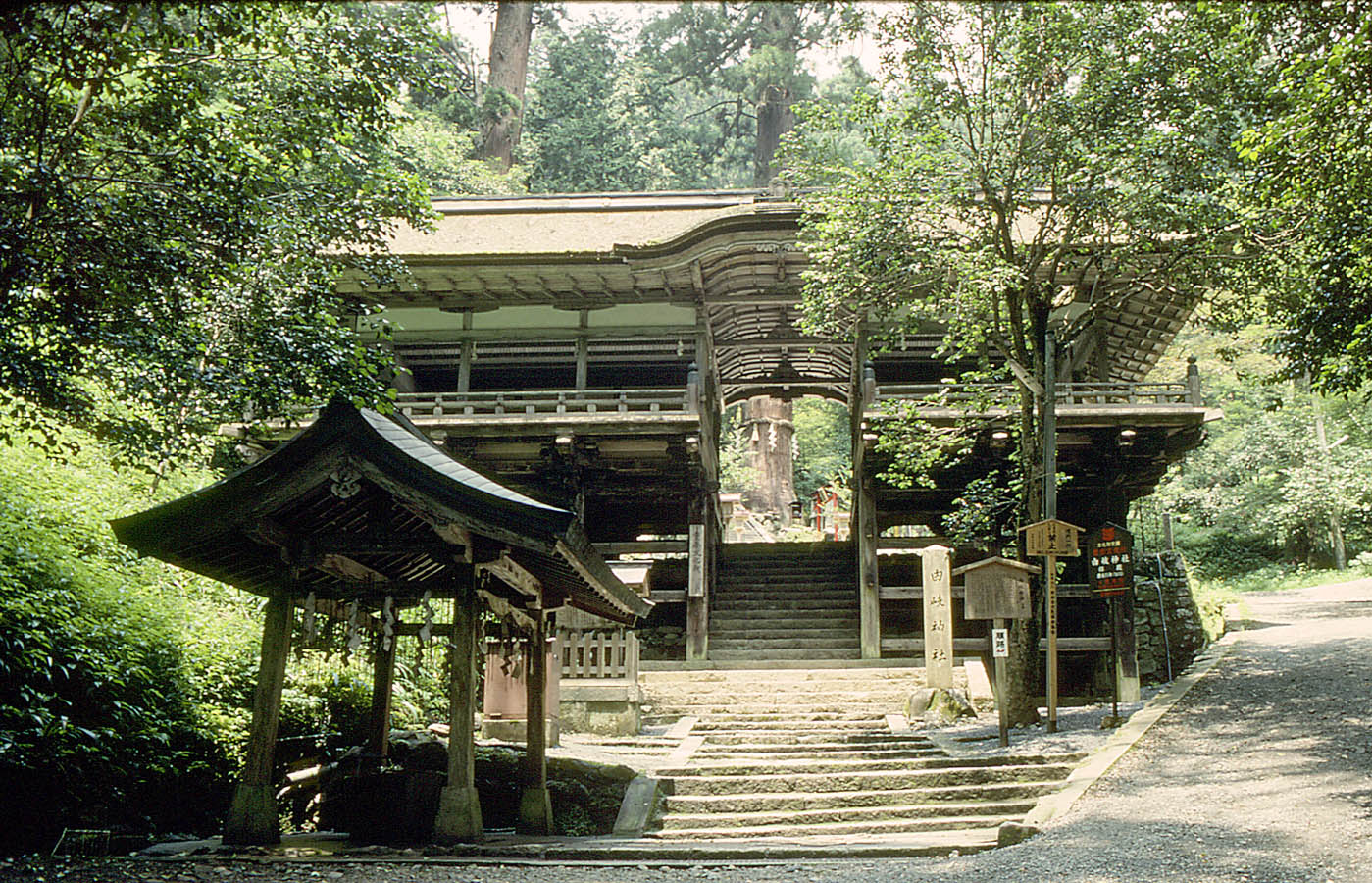
Shrine at Kurama Temple

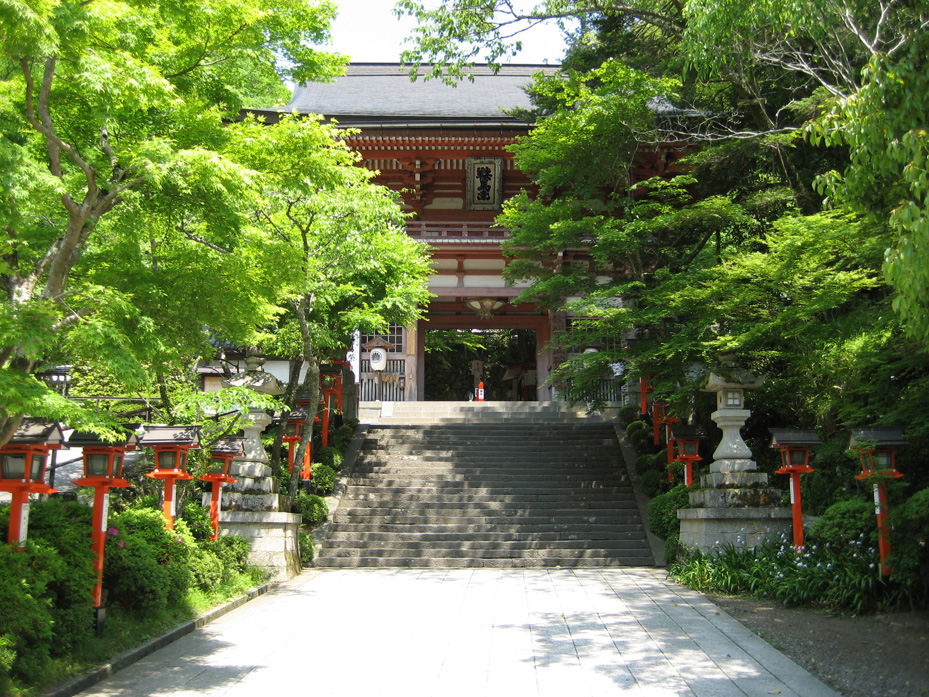
Main Gate of Kurama Temple

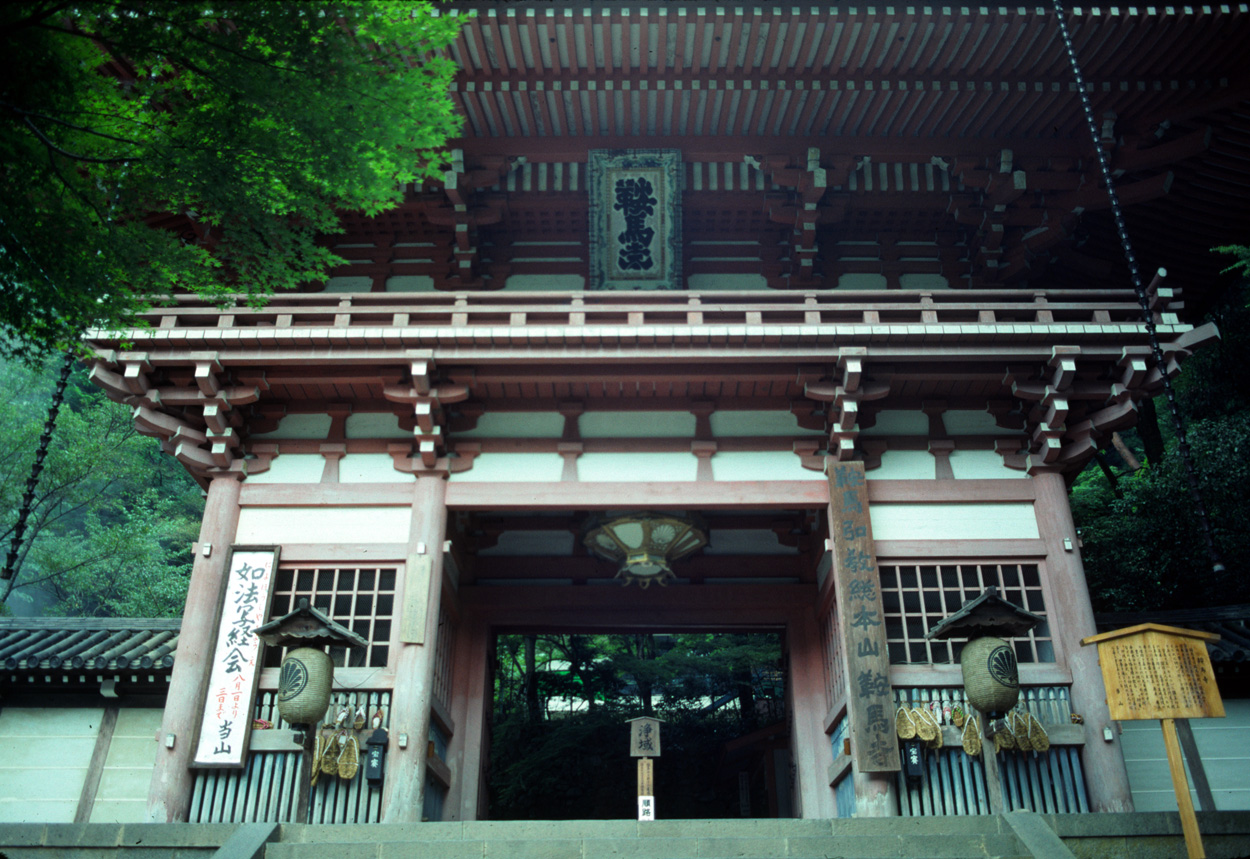
A close-up of the main gate of Kurama Temple

Mount Kurama (鞍(くら)馬(ま)山(やま), Kurama-yama) is a mountain to the north of the Japanese city of Kyoto. It is the birthplace of the Reiki practice, and is said to be the home of Sōjōbō, King of the Tengu.

Kurama is also the location of the annual Kurama Fire Festival (鞍馬の火祭り, Kurama no Hi-matsuri), which takes place every October. Kurama-dera (鞍馬寺) is now designated as a national treasure of Japan.

== Great-Tengu ==
Sōjōbō was supposedly the Tengu who taught swordsmanship to Minamoto no Yoshitsune.

The philosopher Hayashi Razan lists one of the three greatest of the daitengu as Sōjōbō of Mount Kurama. The demons of Kurama and Atago are among the most famous tengu.

== Holistic healing ==
The mountain is also known as the birthplace of the holistic healing art called Reiki. In 1922 the founder of Reiki, Mikao Usui, meditated for 21 days on this mountain and received the Reiki healing energy and was said to have become an enlightened person and to have gained true insight into the wisdom of life. Mikao Usui meditated near the top of the mountain at a site called Osugi Gongen, at the site of a great sacred tree (kami) said to be an incarnation of the god Maoson.

== See also ==
- Kurama-tengu
