= Gikeiki =

Japanese gunki monogatari ("war-tale")

Cover of the English translation

The Gikeiki (義経記) or Chronicle of Yoshitsune is a Japanese gunki monogatari ("war-tale") that focuses on the legends of Minamoto no Yoshitsune and his followers. It is the oldest extant collection of stories concerning Yoshitune's boyhood and fugitive years and the single most important source for the Yoshitune legend which is written about how a legend is born and how a folk hero is shaped. It seems clearly to have intended to supplement Heike Monogatari and other tales of the war. Thought to have been written during the Nanboku-chō period, from the perspective of literature, it has provided inspiration to numerous Noh, kabuki and bunraku plays. Much of the image that people today have of Yoshitsune and those associated with him (Saitō no Musashibō Benkei and Shizuka Gozen, for example) is considered to have been influenced by the Gikeiki. It is also thought that this work is comparable to "Soga Brothers Monogatari", a work from the same period.

== History ==
The word "Gikeiki" literally means "The Record of Yoshitsune", but the on-yomi of the kanji for his name are used in reading it aloud – "yoshi" (義) is read as "gi", and "tsune" (経) is read "kei". The final part "ki" means record.

All previous texts of Gikeiki are essentially the same, there are no major variations. These fall into three categories:

1. Manuscripts - These include texts with titles such as Hogan Monogatari and Yoshitsune Monogatari.
2. Woodblock editions - The major woodblock printings were made in 1633, 1635, 1640, 1645, 1659, 1670, 1673, 1689, 1698, 1708, and 1724.
3. Movable wooden print editions - There are four movable print editions ranging from 1600 to 1633.

== Critical reception ==
Gikeiki depicts the tragic events of Yoshitsune and is written in such a way that the people around Yoshitsune help and support him. This depiction gives the reader a sense of sympathy. Yoshitsune was built on the sacrifices and dedication of others and reigned in popular legend as a symbolic presence. It has been analyzed that the reason why Gikeiki has been incorporated into literary works more than the Tale of the Heike is because Gikeiki is a story that is empathetic, popular, and tragic.

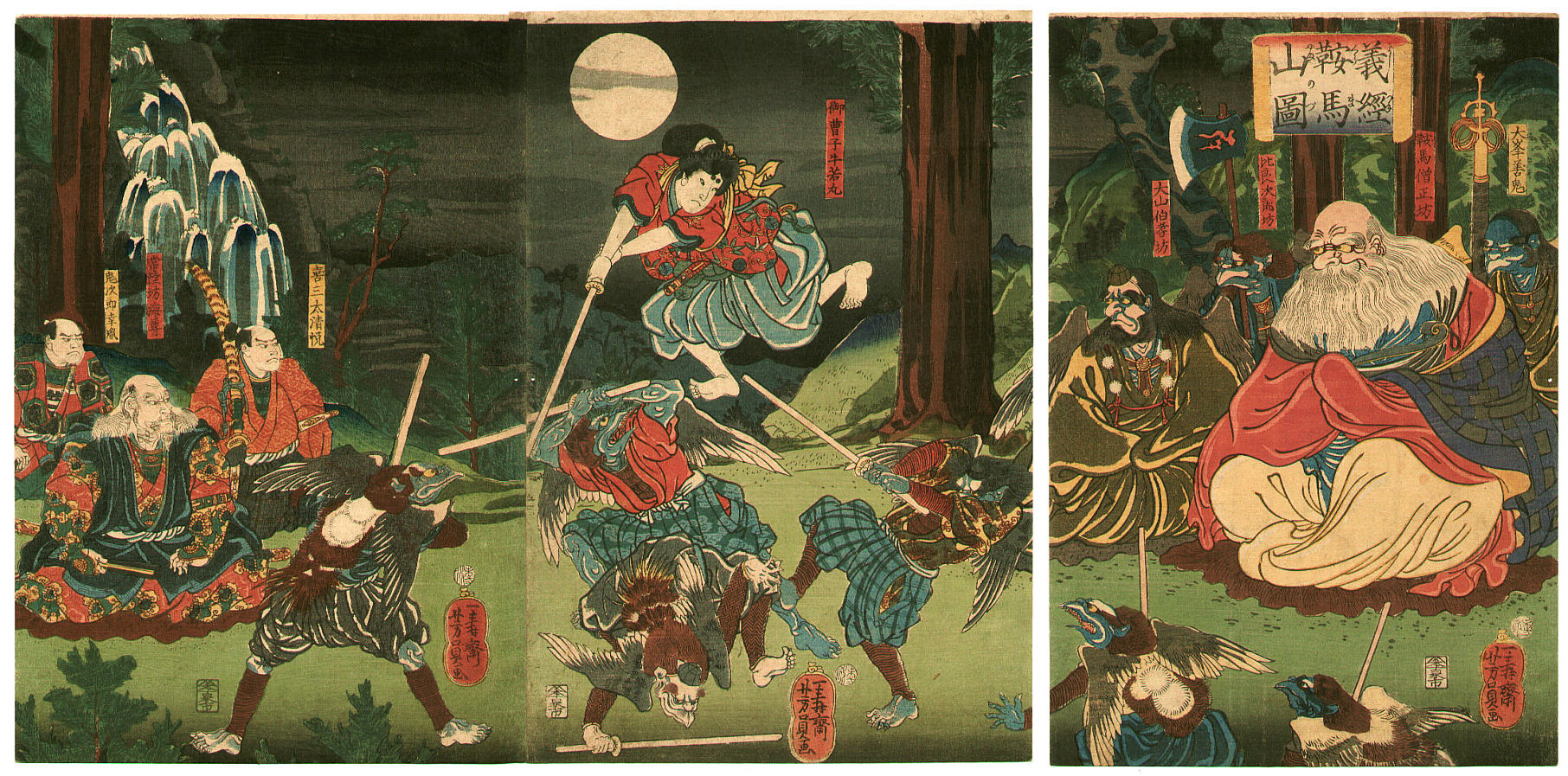
Yoshitsune's illustration of Mt. Kurama. Training with Tengu at Mt. Kurama

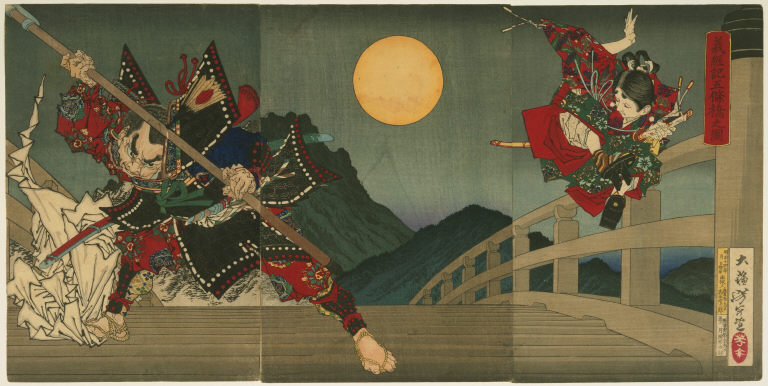
Illustration of the Gojo Bridge from Gikeiki. Yoshitsune and Benkei fighting on Gojo Bridge (illustrated by Yoshitoshi Tsukioka)

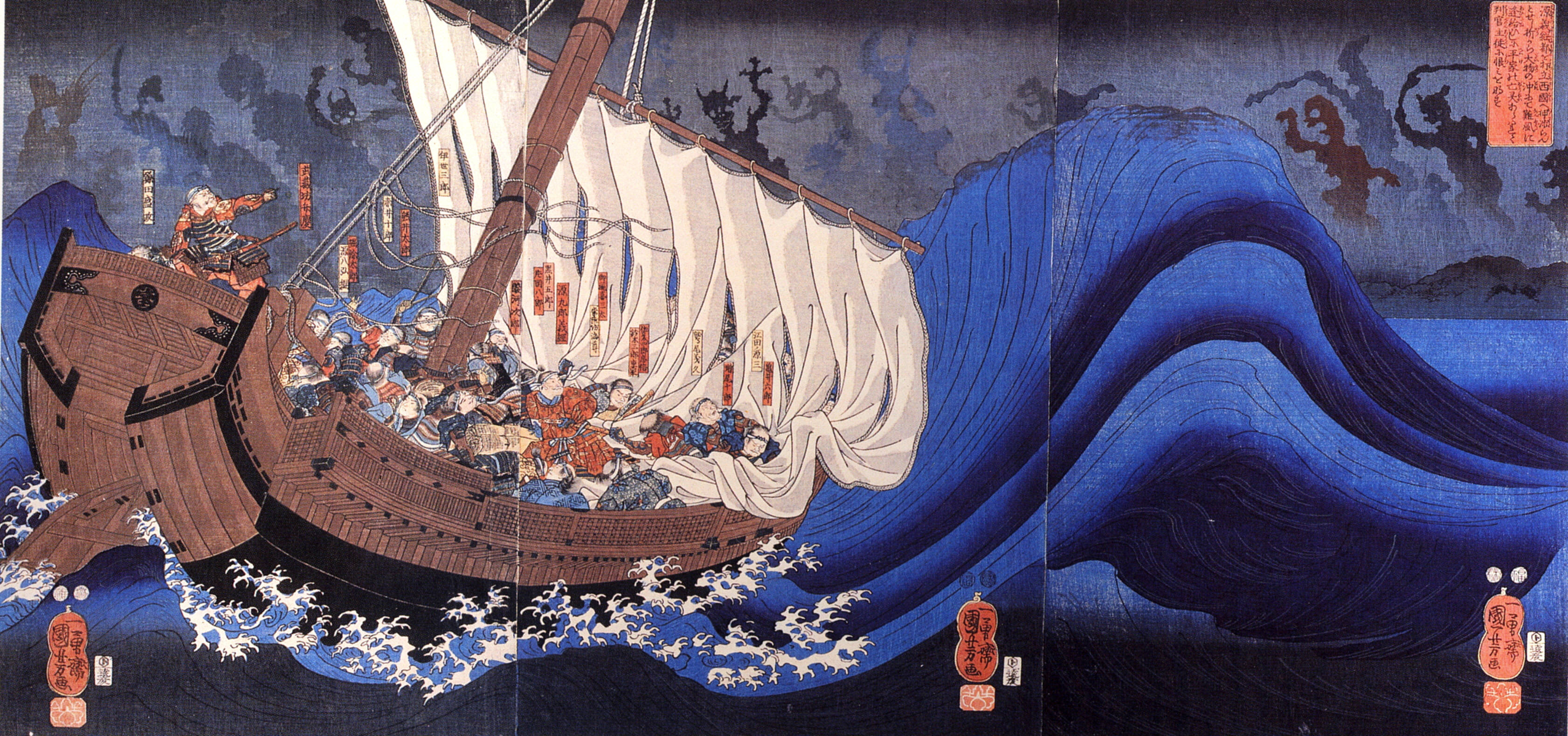
The ghost of the great Uraha family. Yoshitsune and his party chased by the ghosts of the Heike clan (illustrated by Kuniyoshi Utagawa)

== Translations ==
- McCullough, Helen Craig (1966). Yoshitsune: a fifteenth-century Japanese chronicle. Stanford, Calif.: Stanford University Press. ISBN 0804702705.
- Strugat︠s︡kogo, Arkadii︠a︡ (2000). Skazanie o Esit︠s︡unė. Sankt-Peterburg: Evrazii︠a︡. ISBN 5807100565.

== See also ==
- Heike Monogatari
