= Kurama-tengu =

Noh play

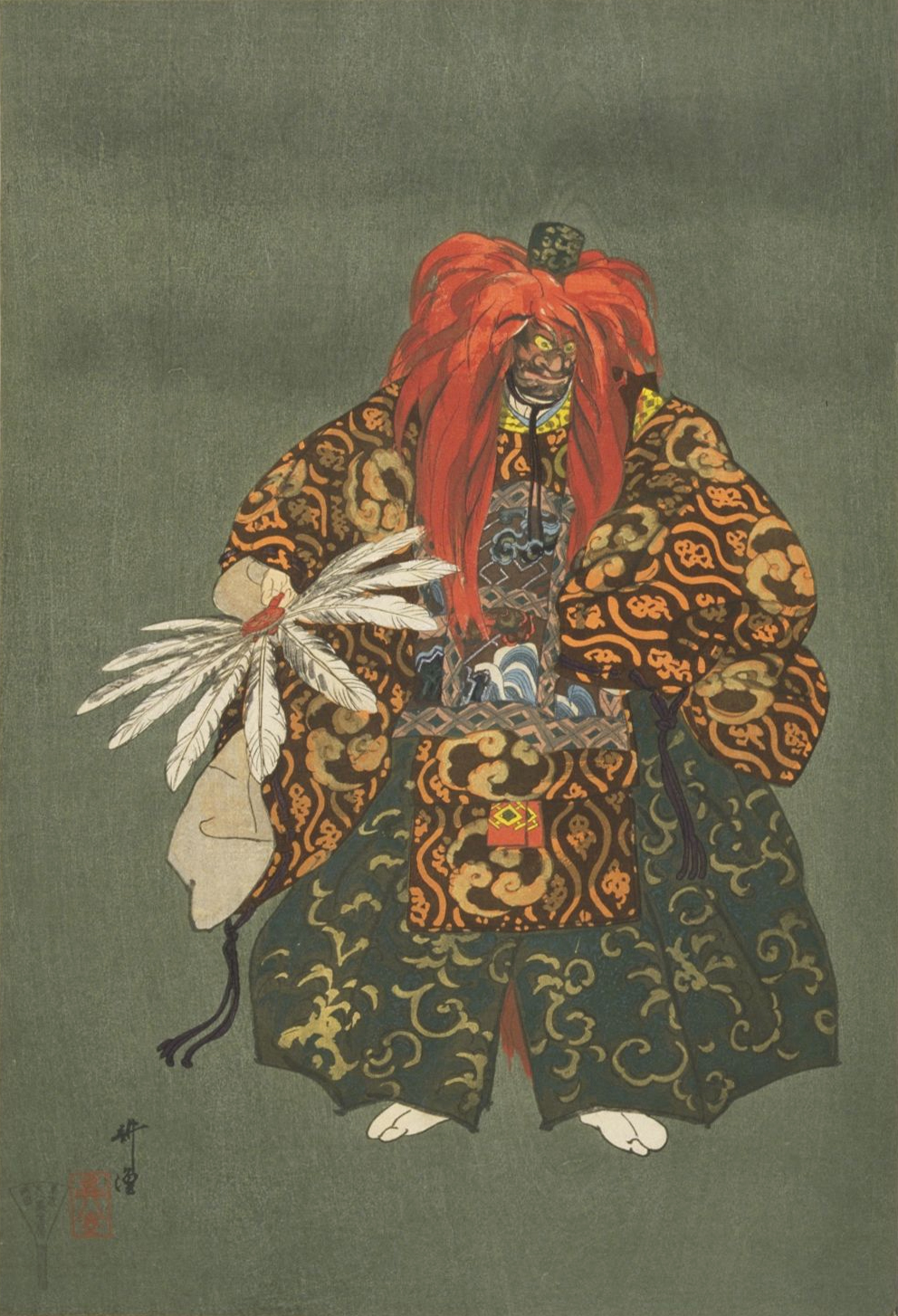
Scene from Kurama-tengu, woodblock print by Tsukioka Kōgyo, from the series Nōgaku hyakuban or One Hundred Noh Plays (National Noh Theatre)

Kurama-tengu (鞍馬天狗, The Goblin of Kurama) is a Noh play from the fifteenth century, concerned with the childhood experiences of the samurai hero Minamoto no Yoshitsune.

== Plot ==
The play begins with a cherry blossom viewing expedition involving monks and children from Kurama temple. On being joined by a rough Yamabushi - an ascetic mountain priest - the party leaves in protest, with the exception of one child, who reveals himself as the young Yoshitsune, isolated at the temple both as an orphaned son and as the only child from the (eclipsed) Genji clan. The stranger reveals himself in turn as the head Tengu, or long-nosed goblin; and he proceeds to instruct the young hero in the martial arts, with a view to him avenging his slaughtered father's death.

== Characteristics ==
- The play is notable for the large cast of child actors, and for the range of actions - chanting; acting; swordplay - which they undertake.
- Critics have seen elements of homoeroticism in the relationship between the (phallicized) Yamabushi and the child actors.

== Influence ==
- Gekkei painted 'Young Bull and the Goblins', based on the play, and including an associated haiku by Kikaku:

"First cherry blossoms - Let me show you a letter That the goblins wrote".

== See also ==
- Eboshi-ori
- Sōjōbō
- Zeami Motokiyo
