= Eboshi-ori =

Traditional Japanese play

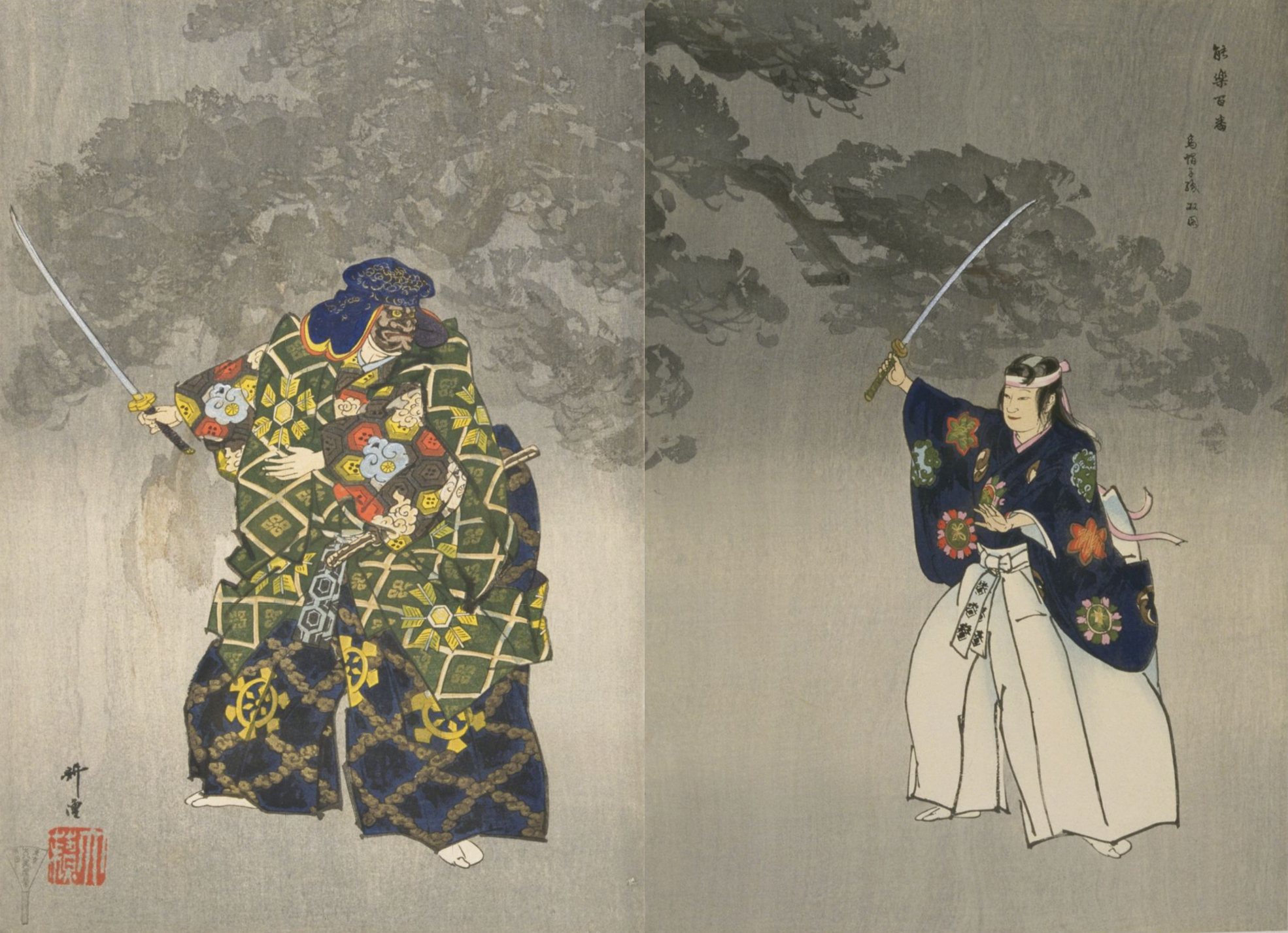
Pair of woodblock prints with a scene from Eboshi-ori by Tsukioka Kōgyo, from the series Nōgaku hyakuban or One Hundred Noh Plays (National Noh Theatre)

Eboshi-ori (烏帽子折, The Eboshi maker) is a Noh play of the 16th century by Miyamasu.

The play falls into the category of genzai-mono, or present time plays, where the action takes place consecutively, without the (more usual) retrospective flashback.

== Historical setting ==
The play takes place during the youth of the samurai leader Minamoto no Yoshitsune, then known as Ushiwaka or Young Bull, at a time when (following the Hōgen rebellion), the Taira clan were in power in Japan. Ushiwaka was in seclusion at Kurama temple, where he was learning martial arts, supposedly at the hands of a goblin-like Tengu.

== Plot ==
Ushiwaka absconds from the temple to join a merchant caravan, and to disguise himself orders an eboshi, or warrior hat, "folded to the left [as] in the time of the Minamoto clan". Though warned against this on the grounds that "after the years of Hōgen, the house of Hei [Taira] prevailed, and the whole land was theirs", he persists in his request, and on obtaining the eboshi, he offers his sword in payment. The hatmaker and his wife, Minamoto sympathisers, refuse to accept it, and Young Bull retrieves his sword, promising that "if ever I come into the World [power] again, I will not forget".

A bandit attack on the merchants sees the sword immediately brought into use, as Young Bull calls upon the secret arts of the Kurama tengu to defeat the robbers and slay their leader, Kumasaka, in single combat.

== Later developments ==
The twenty-first century has seen Simon Starling build on the play as a study in personal reinvention so as to create an exhibition of masks.

== See also ==
- Benkei on the Bridge
- Hachiman
- Pointed hat
- Sōjōbō
