= Kinkeizan =

Mount Kinkei
- 金鶏山
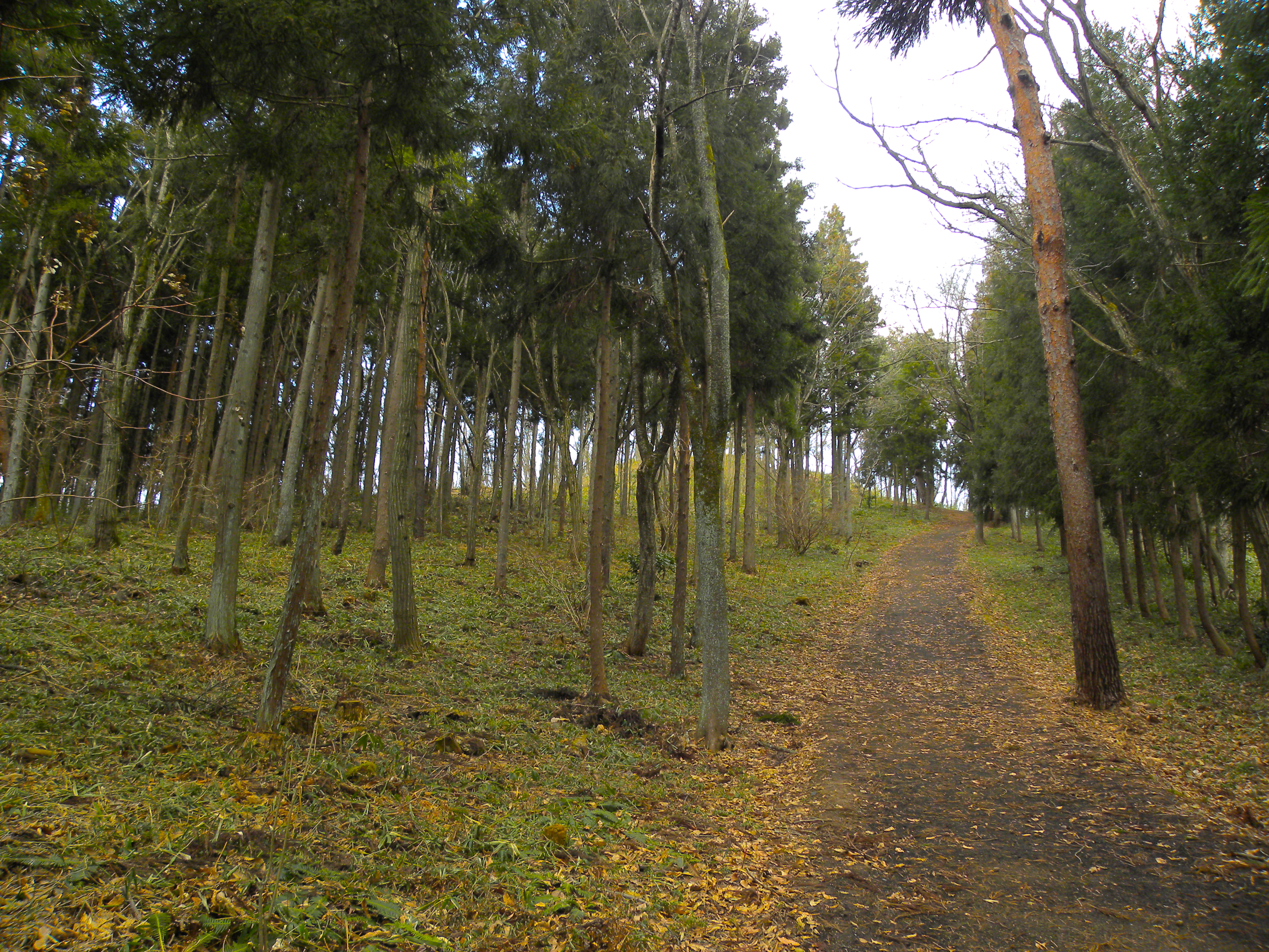
- Mount Kinkei

Highest point
- Elevation: 98.3 m (323 ft)
- Coordinates: 38°59′36.4″N 141°06′33.2″E

Geography
- Location within Iwate Prefecture Location within Japan
- Location: Tōhoku region, Honshū, Japan
- National Historic Site

UNESCO World Heritage Site
- Type: Cultural
- Criteria: ii, iv
- Designated: 2011
- Reference no.: 1277

Mount Kinkei (金鶏山, Kinkei-san or Kinkei-zan) is a conical hill in the town of Hiraizumi in southwestern Iwate Prefecture, Japan. The mountain is part of the UNESCO World Heritage Site Historic Monuments and Sites of Hiraizumi.

== Overview ==
Mount Kinkei is a sacred mountain that has influenced the spatial layout of the temple complex at Hiraizumi. It lies approximately halfway between the temples of Chuson-ji and Mōtsū-ji. According to the legend, the hill was built in a single night by Fujiwara no Hidehira of the Northern Fujiwara to the west of Muryōkō-in temple, which was intended to be a copy of the Byōdō-in temple in Uji (near Kyoto). The name of the hill is said to be derived from a golden cockerel was buried on the top.

In 1930, illegal excavations to find the legendary golden cockerel uncovered ceramic and earthenware and copper sutra containers, indicating that the summit of the hill was used as a sutra mound. The sutra containers are now at the Tokyo National Museum.

Subsequent excavations found the remains of a Hall identified as belonging to Zaō Gongen; associated with the cult of Miroku.

On 22 February 2005, Mount Kinkei was declared a national historic site.

== Gallery ==
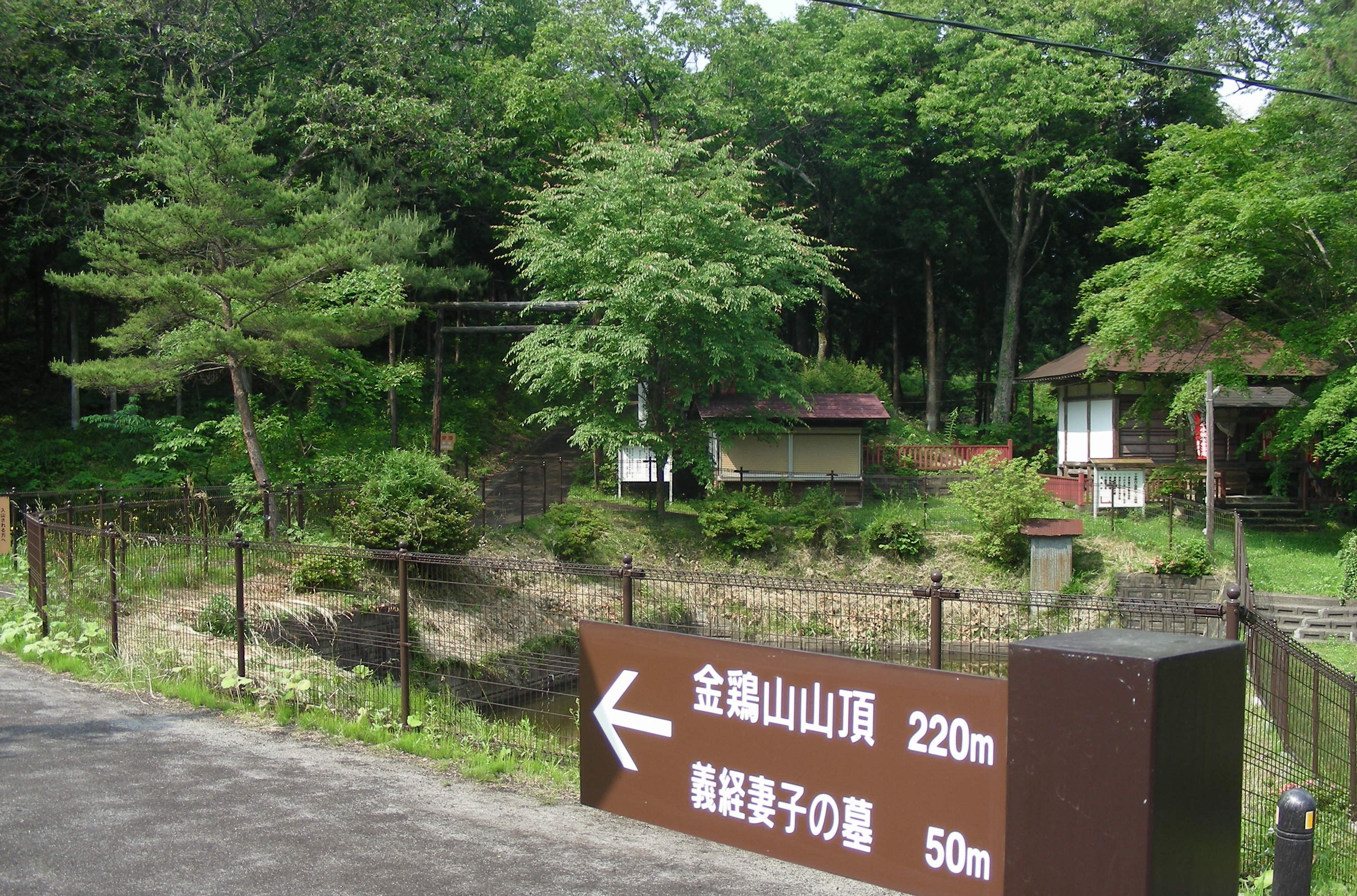
Senju-do chapel and entrance to hiking path

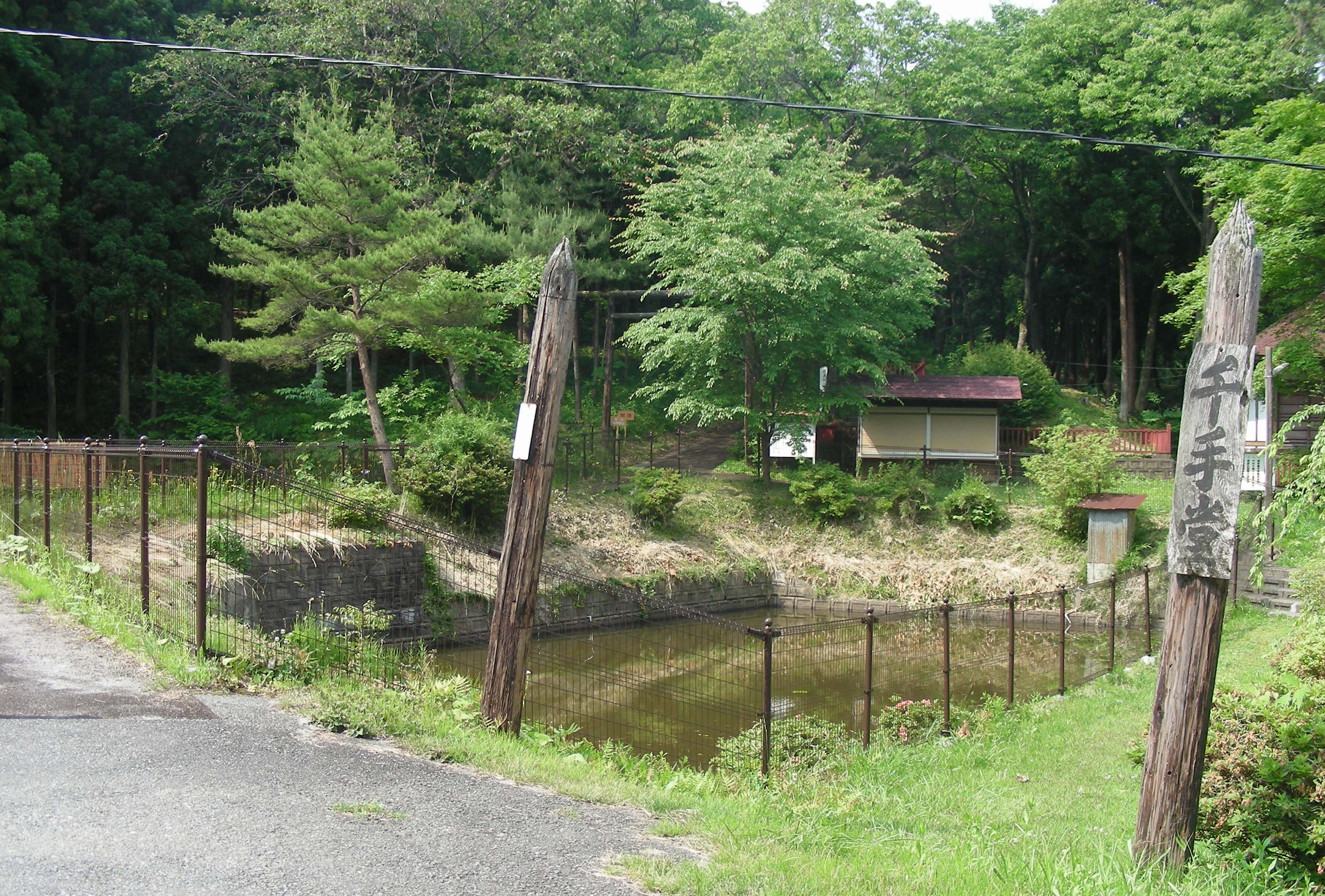
Senju-do chapel

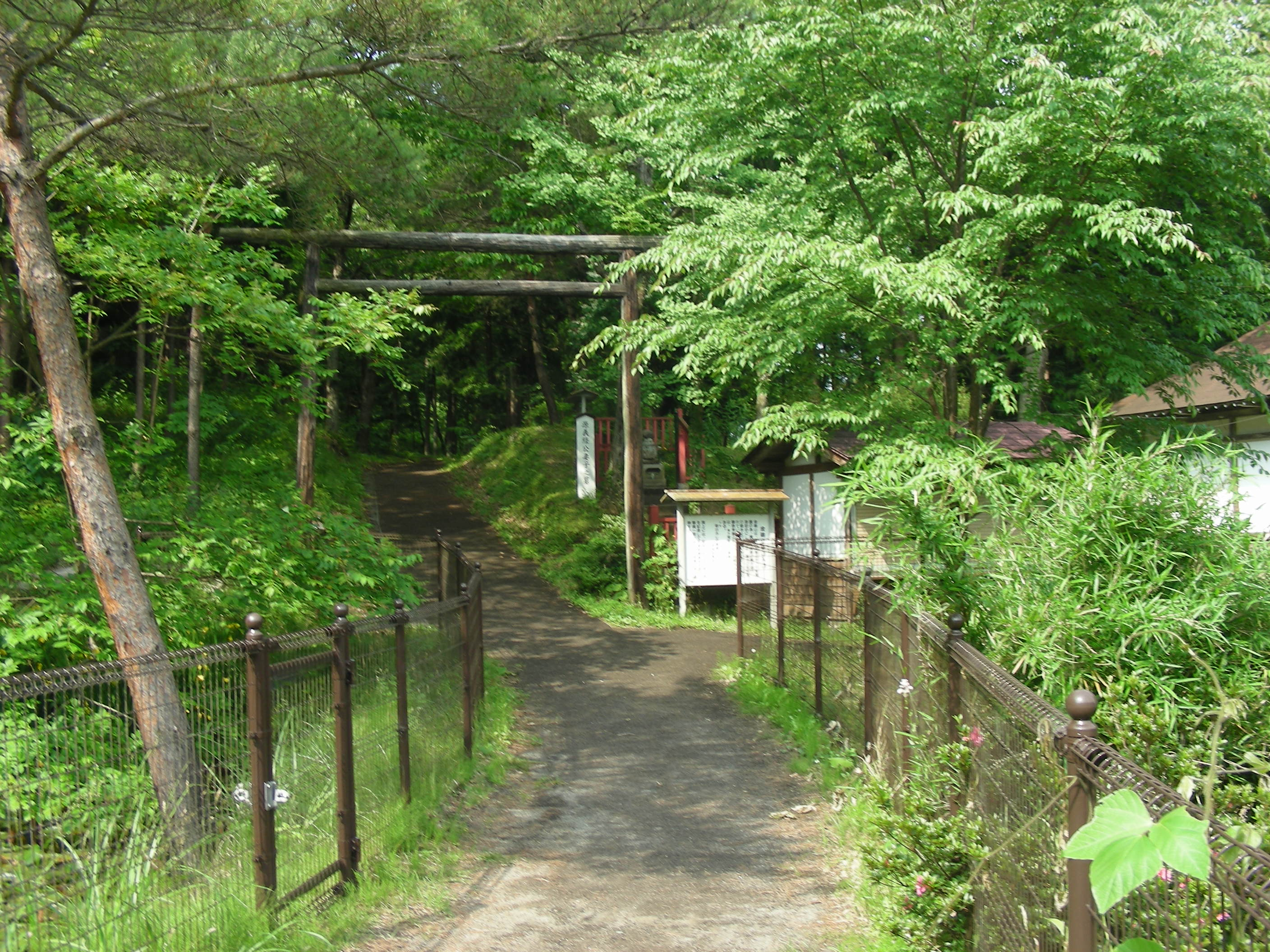
Entrance to climbing path

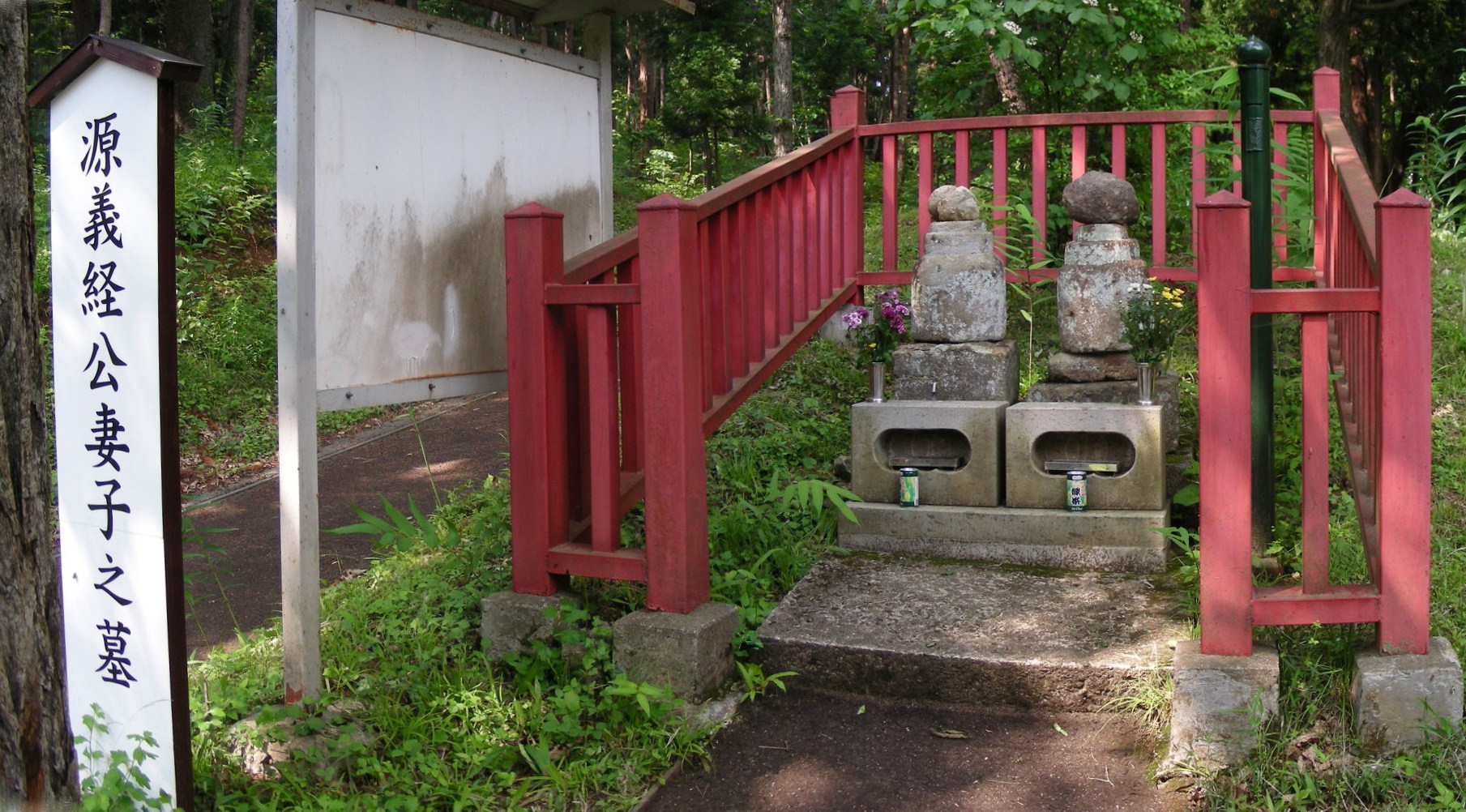
Inside Senju-do chapel

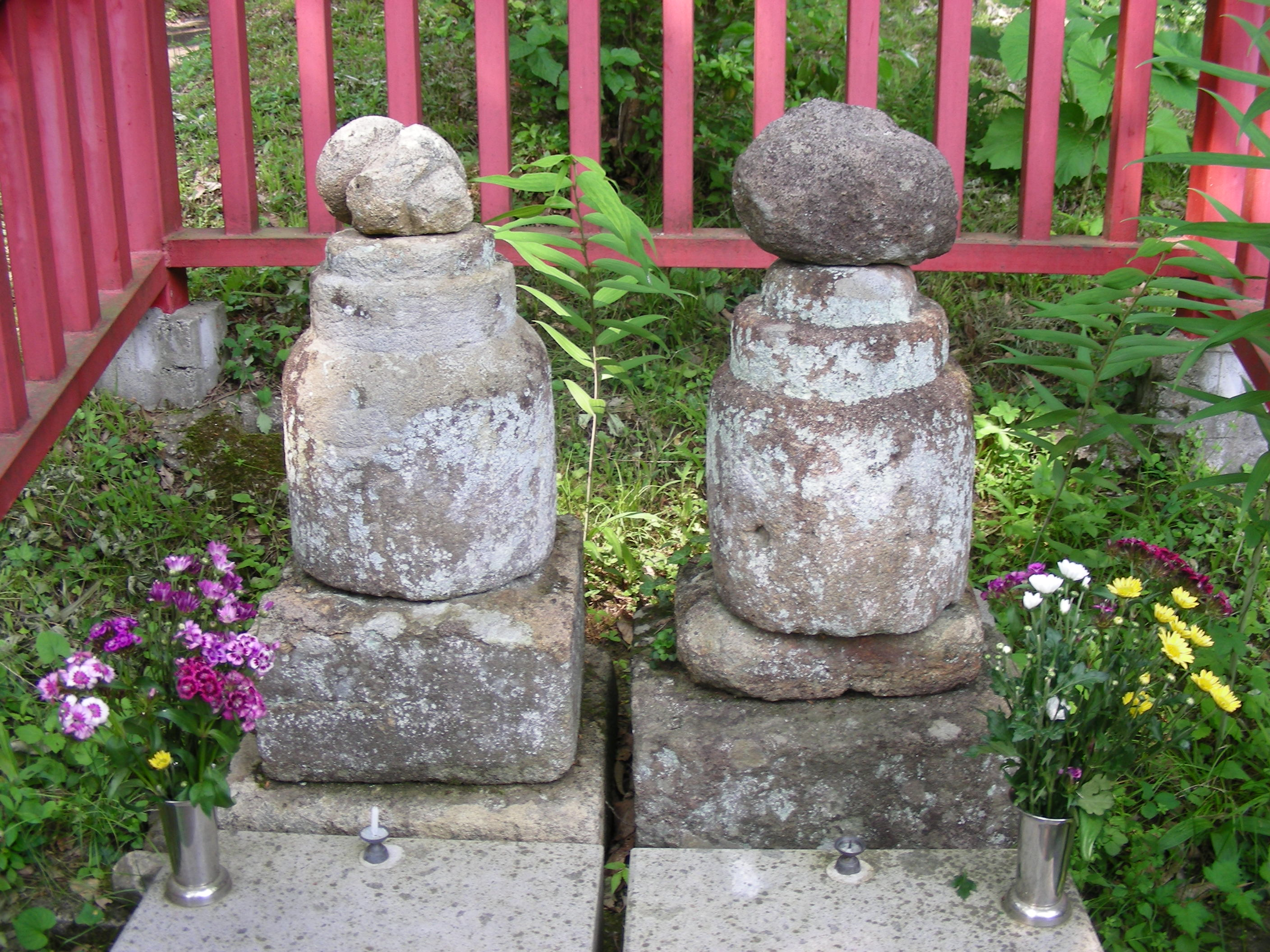
Yoshitsune's wife &child gravestones

== See also ==
- World Heritage Sites in Japan
- List of Historic Sites of Japan (Iwate)
