= Kanjizaiō-in =

Buddhist temple in Japan

- 観自在王院
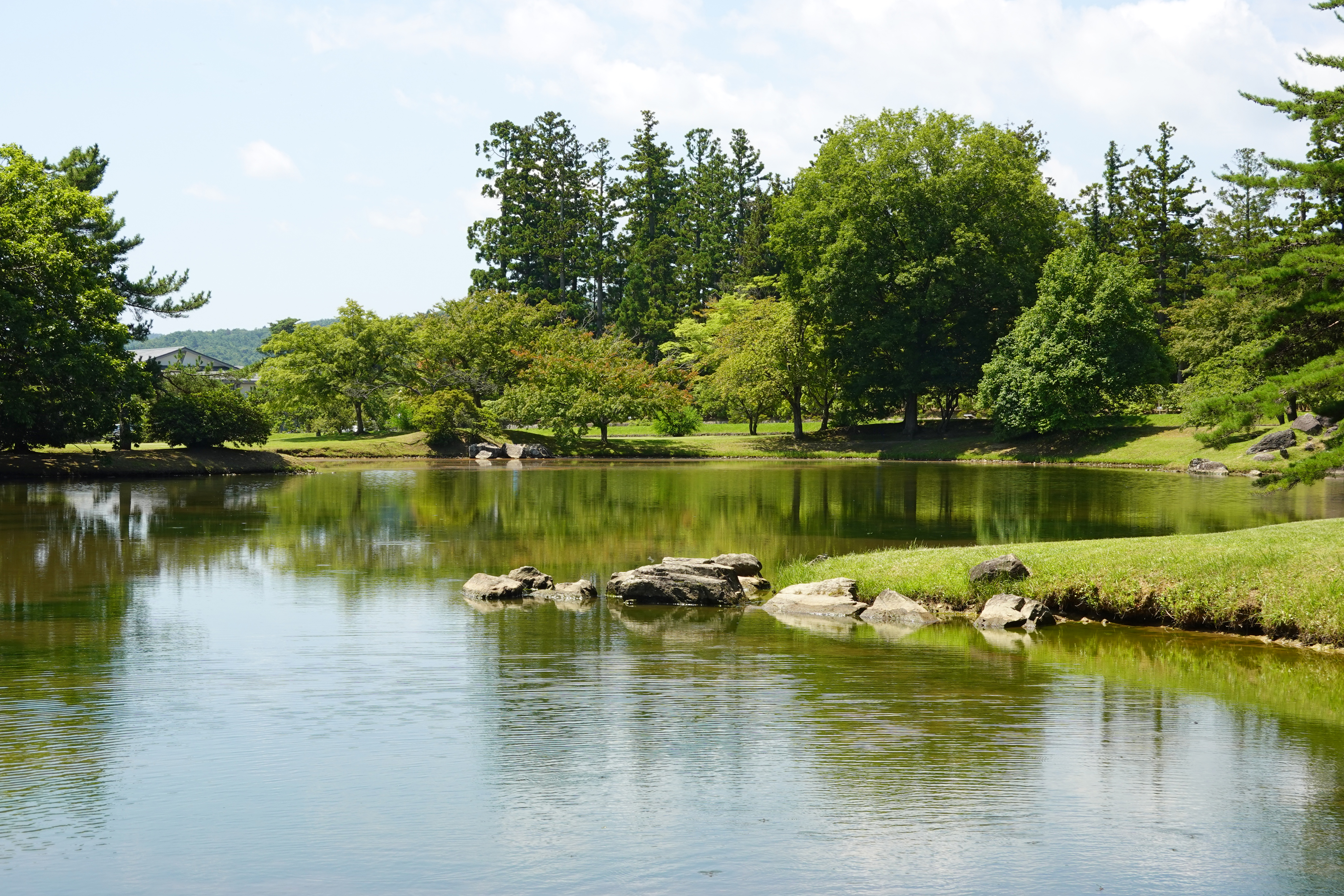
- The pond at Kanjizaio-in looking north across the central island toward the site of the Amida halls

- Location within Iwate Prefecture Location within Japan

Religion
- Affiliation: Buddhist
- Deity: Amida Nyōrai
- Status: ruins

Location
- Country: Japan
- Interactive map of Kanjizaiō-in
- Coordinates: 38°59′19″N 141°06′37″E

Architecture
- Founder: wife of Fujiwara no Motohira
- UNESCO World Heritage Site
- Type: Cultural
- Criteria: ii, iv
- Designated: 2011
- Reference no.: 1277

Kanjizaiō-in (観自在王院) was a Buddhist temple located in Hiraizumi in what is now southern Iwate Prefecture in the Tōhoku region of Japan. The temple fell into ruins during the Kamakura period; however, the pond from its gardens has been restored to its original dimensions, and has been designated a nationally designated Place of Scenic Beauty in 2005. The ruins are also covered as part of the Special National Historic Site designation for neighboring Mōtsū-ji. Together with other important sites in Hiraizumi, the ruins form part of the UNESCO World Heritage Site Historic Monuments and Sites of Hiraizumi.

== Overview ==
Kanjizaiō-in was founded by the wife of Fujiwara no Motohira, the second of the Northern Fujiwara rulers. It was located directly across from Enryū-ji and Kashō-ji, twin temples founded by her husband. As with other Buddhist temples in the Hiraizumi area, the temple shared the Pure Land theme with a large pond surrounded by gardens. The pond was fed by a stream from Mōtsū-ji. Both Mōtsū-ji and Kanjizaiō-in also had large earthen walls surrounding their compounds with majestic entrance gates. Whereas the temple structures at Mōtsū-ji were elaborate and opulent, the buildings at Kanjizaiō-in were much plainer and simpler.

Kanjizaiō-in consisted of a Large Amida Hall and a Small Amida Hall in a 160 x 260 meter compound. Bridges from the entrance gate on the south to an island in the center of the pond led to the Amida Halls on the northern side of the pond. There may have been a pagoda on the eastern side as well. The Large Amida Hall contained an Amida triad and its walls were painted with scenes of Kyoto. The walls of the Small Amida Hall were decorated with poems written by Fujiwara no Norinaga much like the walls at Enryū-ji. It is possible that Motohira's wife lived in the smaller hall and worshipped in the larger one. Some scholars suppose that Kanjizaiō-in was built after Motohira's death as a memorial temple.

Both Mōtsū-ji and Kanjizaiō-in were destroyed by fire in 1198 following the downfall of the Northern Fujiwara dynasty, although a smaller temple may have continued to exist on this site until 1578. The site was excavated from 1973–1976, previous to which the site was covered in rice fields. The temple was described in detail in the Kamakura period chronicle, Azuma Kagami, and the foundation pillars of many of the building described have been located. None of the buildings of the temple have been reconstructed.

== See also ==
- World Heritage Sites in Japan
- List of Places of Scenic Beauty of Japan (Iwate)
