= Fujiwara no Motohira =

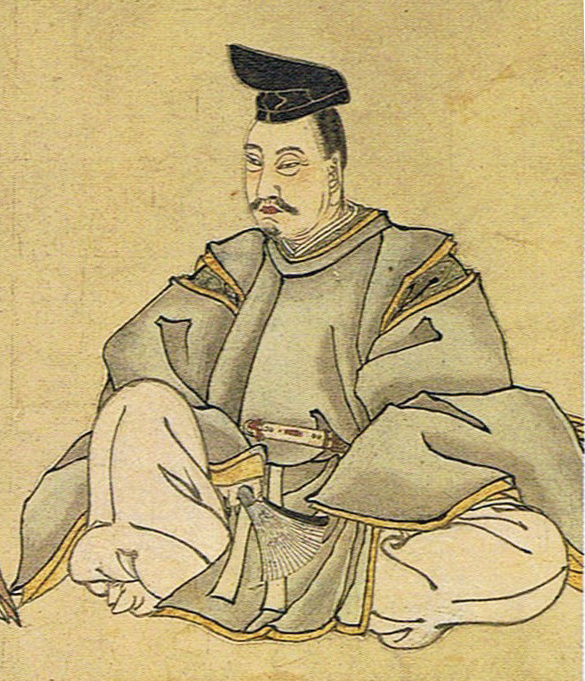
Fujiwara no Motohira.

Fujiwara no Motohira (藤原 基衡; 1105–1157) was the second ruler of Northern Fujiwara in Mutsu Province, Japan, the son of Fujiwara no Kiyohira and the father of Fujiwara no Hidehira.

Fujiwara no Motohira is credited with expansion of Hiraizumi, the residence of Northern Fujiwara. In particular, he founded Mōtsū-ji, and his wife built Kanjizaiō-in which was adjacent to Motsu-ji. Both sites survived, though all the buildings from the Heian period were lost, and are currently listed as constituents of a World Heritage Site, Historic Monuments and Sites of Hiraizumi. He also expanded Chūson-ji, where he was buried, along with his father and his son.

Preceded by Fujiwara no Kiyohira	Northern Fujiwara family head 1128–1157	Succeeded by Fujiwara no Hidehira
