= Shōgyo Ōba =

Shōgyo Ōba (大場松魚, Ōba Shōgyo; March 15, 1916 – June 21, 2012) was a Japanese maki-e lacquer artist. He began practicing the art of maki-e lacquerware in Kanazawa in 1945. Shōgyo was named a Living National Treasure of Japan in 1982 for his expertise in maki-e lacquerware.

Shōgyo was born Ōba Katsuo on March 15, 1916, in Kanazawa City, Ishikawa Prefecture, Japan. His grandfather had established the family lacquer business. Shōgyo graduated from Ishikawa Prefectural Industrial School, where he studied painting and design. Shōgyo then became an apprentice of Matsuda Gonroku in Tokyo.

He especially skilled in the technique of hyōmon, in which pieces of gold or silver cut lead are attached to decorative objects, often to round objects, such as vases, which can be difficult to apply this technique. Shogyo restored the gold and lacquer decorations of Chūson-ji Konjiki-dō. a 10th-century Buddhist temple in Hiraizumi, Iwate, in 1964.

Shōgyo Ōba died on June 21, 2012, at the age of 96.
