= Chūson-ji =

Buddhist temple in Iwate Prefecture, Japan

Chūson-jí
- 中尊寺

- Location within Iwate Prefecture Location within Japan

Religion
- Affiliation: Buddhist
- Deity: Shaka Nyōrai
- Rite: Tendai
- Status: functional

Location
- Location: 202 Hiraizumi-Koromonoseki, Hiraizumi-chō, Nishiiwai-gun, Iwate-ken
- Country: Japan
- Interactive map of Chūson-jí
- Coordinates: 39°00′05″N 141°05′59″E

Architecture
- Founder: Ennin
- Completed: c.850
- UNESCO World Heritage Site
- Type: Cultural
- Criteria: ii, iv
- Designated: 2011
- Reference no.: 1277
- National Treasure of Japan

Website
- Official website

Chūson-ji (中尊寺) is a Buddhist temple in the town of Hiraizumi in southern Iwate Prefecture, Japan. It is the head temple of the Tendai sect in Tōhoku region of northern Honshu. The temple claims it was founded in 850 by Ennin, the third chief abbot of the sect. George Sansom states Chūson-jí was founded by Fujiwara no Kiyohira in 1095. Chūson-jí was designated as a Special Historic Site in 1979 and in June 2011 was listed as a UNESCO World Heritage Site as a part of the "Historic Monuments and Sites of Hiraizumi".

== History ==
At the beginning of the 12th century, large-scale temple construction was carried out by Fujiwara no Kiyohira, the founder of the Northern Fujiwara clan. The temple was built to placate souls of all who died in the Former Nine Years War and the Latter Three Years' War. Kiyohira, who had been forced into bloody battles and lost his family in the war, resolved to bring peace to the region based on an ideal society following the teachings of Buddha. Per the Azuma Kagami (the official history of the Kamakura shogunate) the temple contained more than 40 halls and pagodas, and over 300 monks' residences. Kiyohira's son Fujiwara no Motohira continued this plan, and commissioned his own great temple, Mōtsū-ji, nearby. Mōtsū-ji was completed by his son, Fujiwara no Hidehira, who also commissioned Muryōkō-in.

Hiraizumi flourished for nearly one hundred years, until its destruction by the forces of Minamoto no Yoritomo in 1189. Chūson-ji survived the conflict, but fell into decline. In 1337 fire destroyed much of the temple; however, more than 3,000 National Treasures and Important Cultural Properties survived.

During the Edo period, it was partially rebuilt by the Date clan of Sendai Domain and became a subsidiary temple of Kan'ei-ji in Edo. It was visited by Matsuo Bashō during his travels while writing the Oku no Hosomichi.

== Konjiki-dō ==
The Konjiki-dō (金色堂) is a small building completed in 1124, which still conveys an image of what Chūson-ji looked like in its prime. The building is covered with gold leaf on both the interior and exterior. Inside, the decorations use mother-of-pearl inlays, woodwork, metalwork, lacquerwork and paintings, bringing together many aspects of late Heian period arts and crafts It is one of two buildings that survive from the original Chūson-ji temple complex, the other being a sutra repository. The building also serves as a mausoleum containing the mummified remains of the leaders of the Northern Fujiwara clan.

The building measures five-and-a-half meters on each side and is eight meters tall. The interior of the building contains three altars, one for each of the first three Fujiwara lords. Each altar had a seated Amida Nyōrai surrounded by standing Kannon Bosatsu and Seishi Bosatsu, six Jizō Bosatsu and two Niten statues. One Niten figure is now missing. The building was rebuilt from 1962 to 1968.

The mummies were last examined in 1950. It is assumed that the mummy of Fujiwara no Kiyohira was placed under the central altar. Fujiwara no Motohira's remains were identified as he is known to have died of a cerebral hemorrhage. His mummy was found under the northwest altar. Fujiwara no Hidehira's remains were found under the southwest altar next to a casket containing the head of his son Fujiwara no Yasuhira who was beheaded in 1189.

The Konjiki-dō formerly sat outdoors in the open air. In 1288 it was covered with a wooden structure to protect it from the elements. Today it sits behind thick acrylic glass within a concrete building (constructed in 1965) and is visible only from the front and sides. Shōgyo Ōba, a maki-e lacquer artist, helped to restore the interior lacquer work in 1964.

The building was the first structure designated a National Treasure of Japan.

== Gallery ==
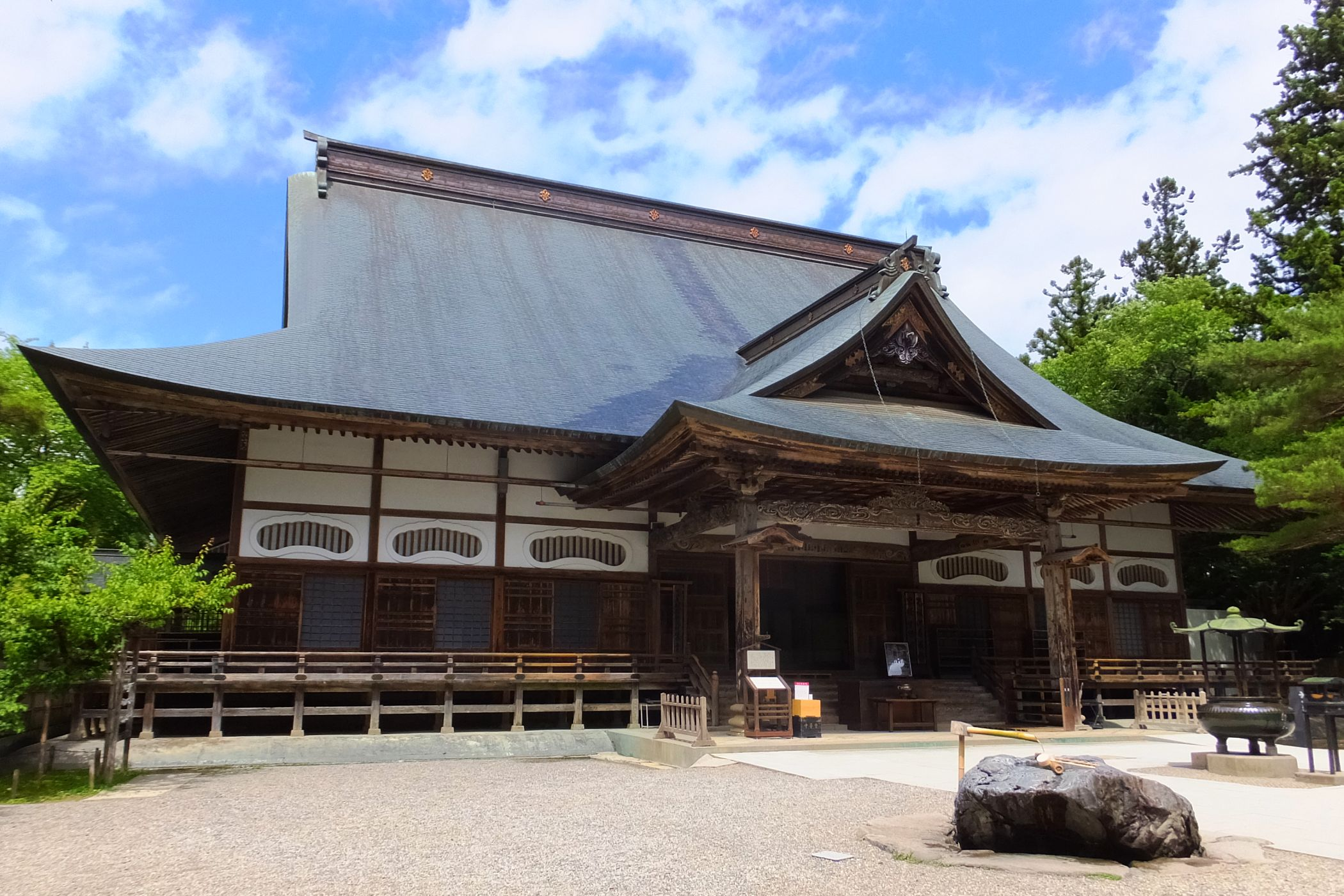
Hondō, the main hall

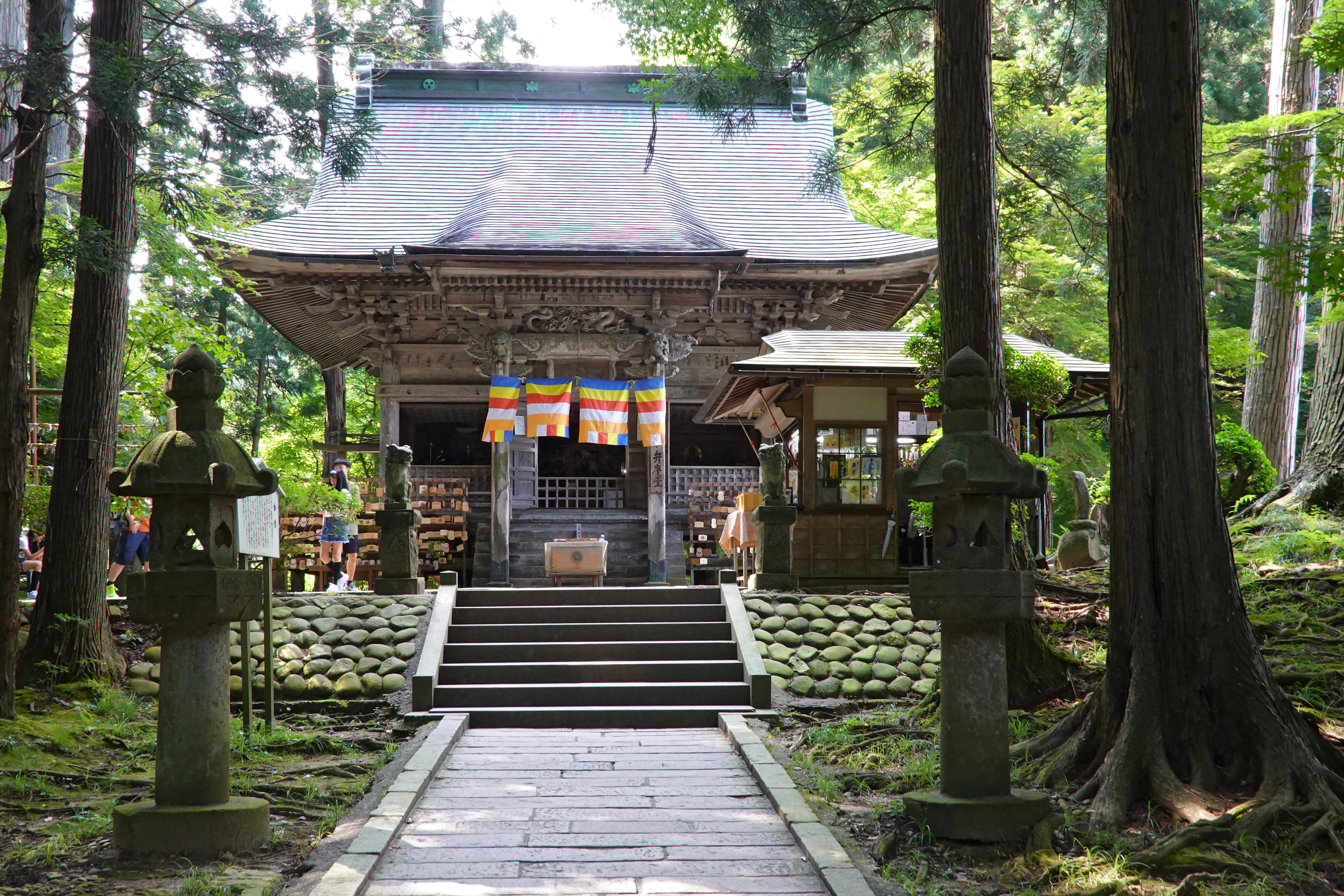
Benkeidō

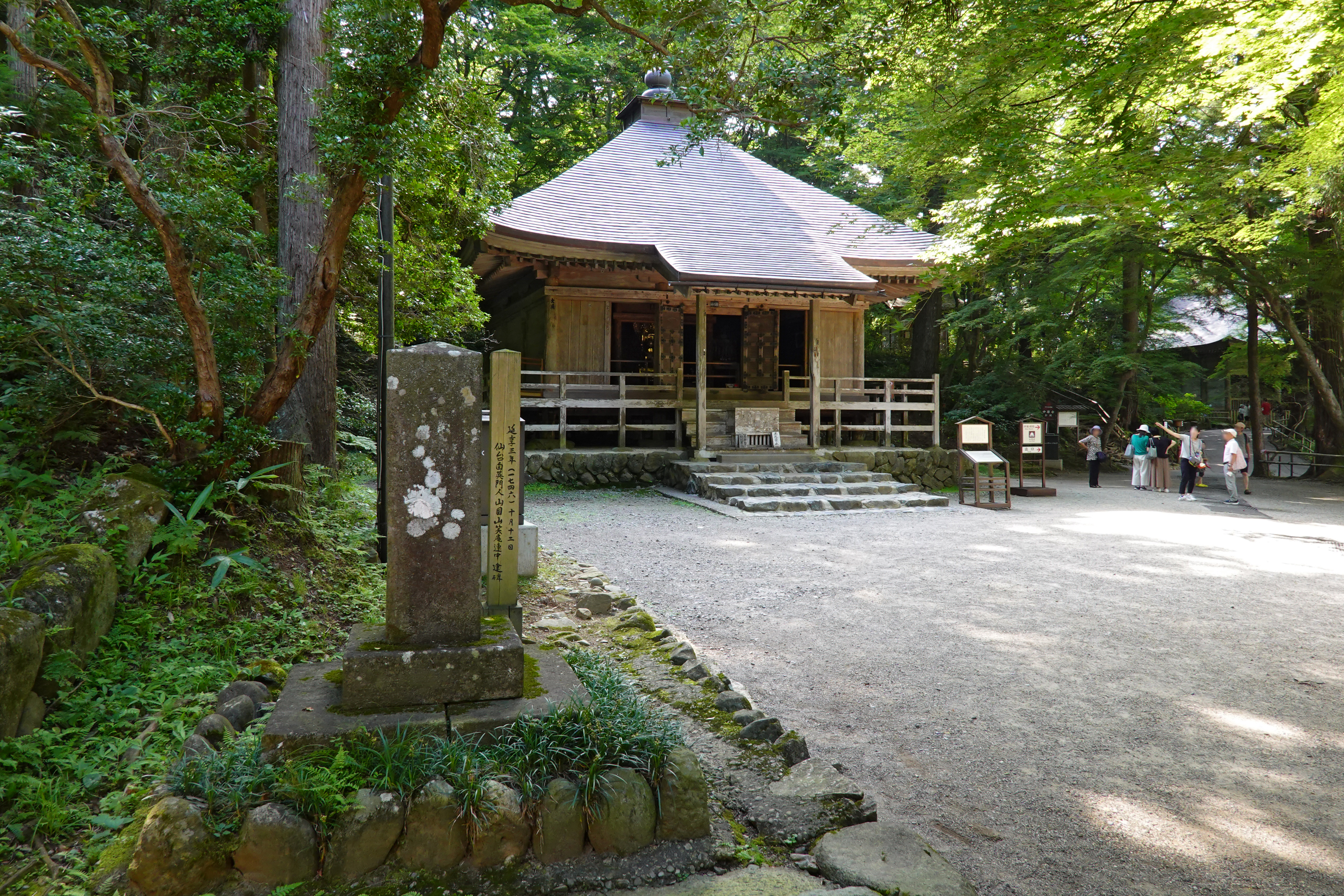
Kyōzō

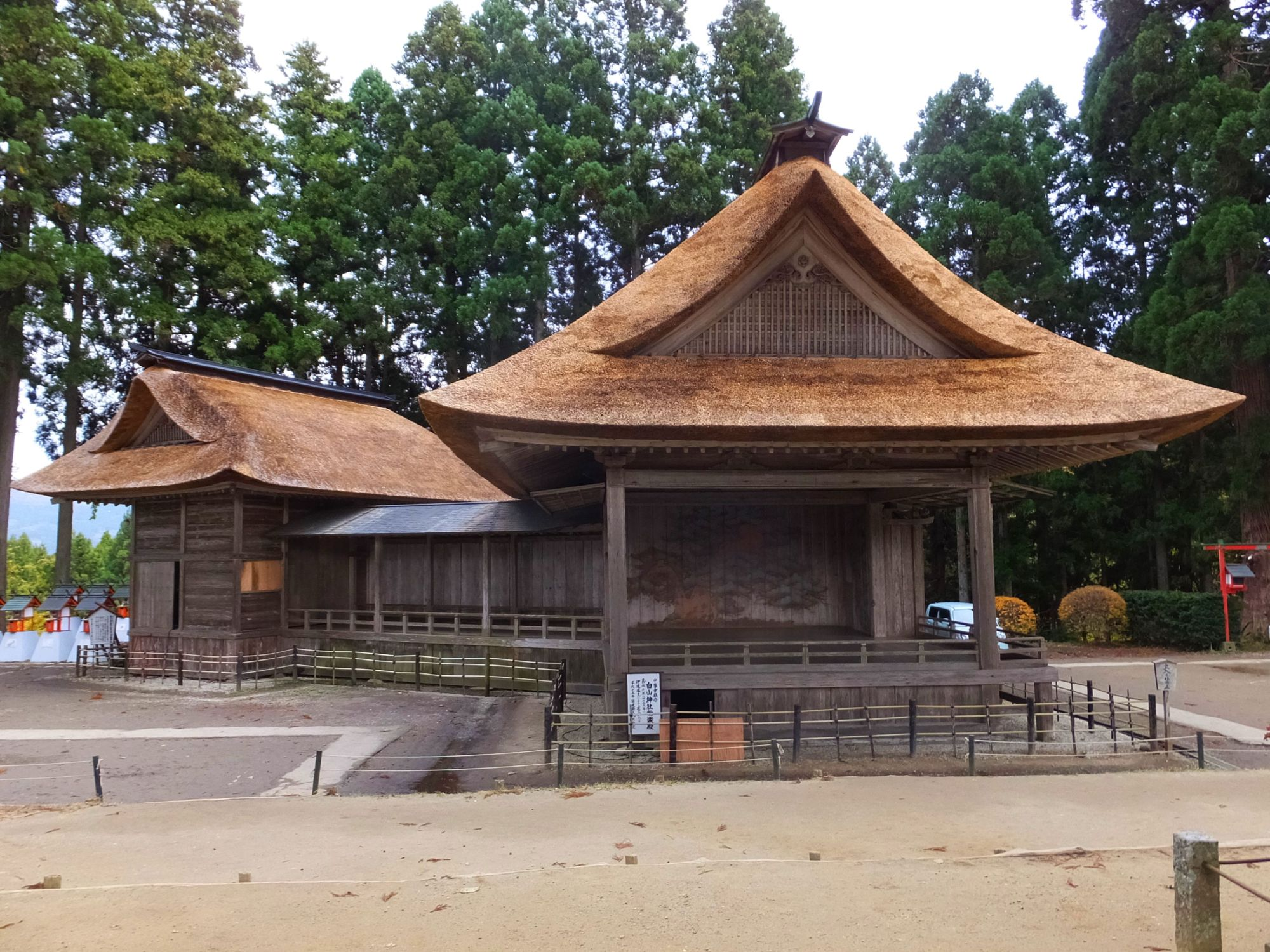
Nōh stage, an Important Cultural Property

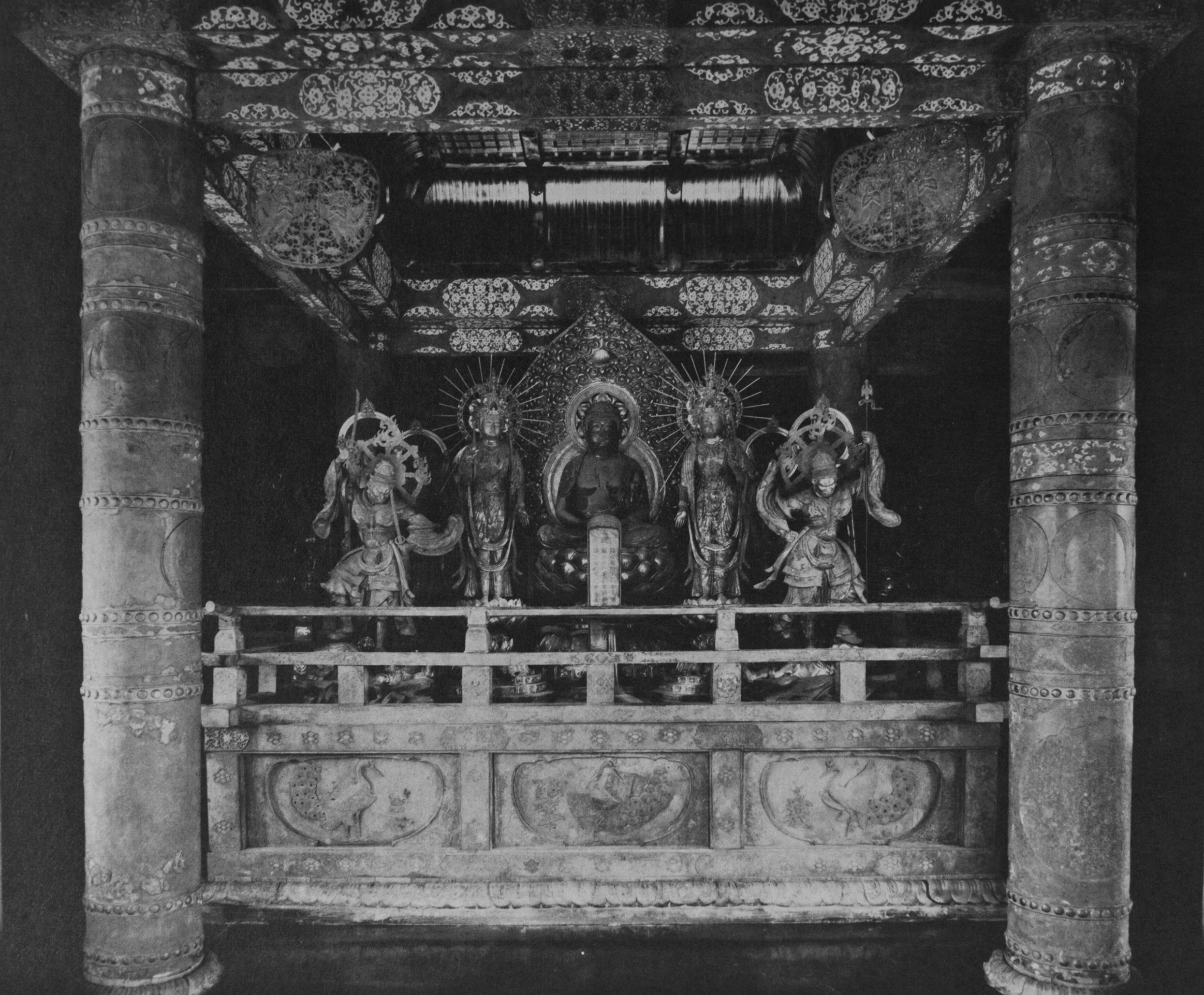
The Interior of Konjiki-dō, a National Treasure

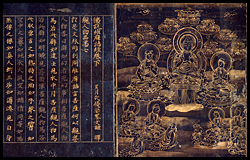
Chūson-ji Sutras, the Buddhist scriptures with gilt letters, a National Treasure

== See also ==
- Kinkaku-ji in Kyoto
- List of Special Places of Scenic Beauty, Special Historic Sites and Special Natural Monuments
- List of National Treasures of Japan (paintings)
- List of National Treasures of Japan (sculptures)
- List of National Treasures of Japan (writings)
- List of National Treasures of Japan (crafts-others)

== Bibliography ==
- Fukuyama Toshio, Heian Temples: Byodo-in and Chuson-ji, Heibonsha Survey of Japanese Art (New York: Weatherhill, 1976). ISBN 9780834810235
