= Takkoku-no-Iwaya =

Buddhist temple in Iwate Prefecture, Japan

- 達谷窟
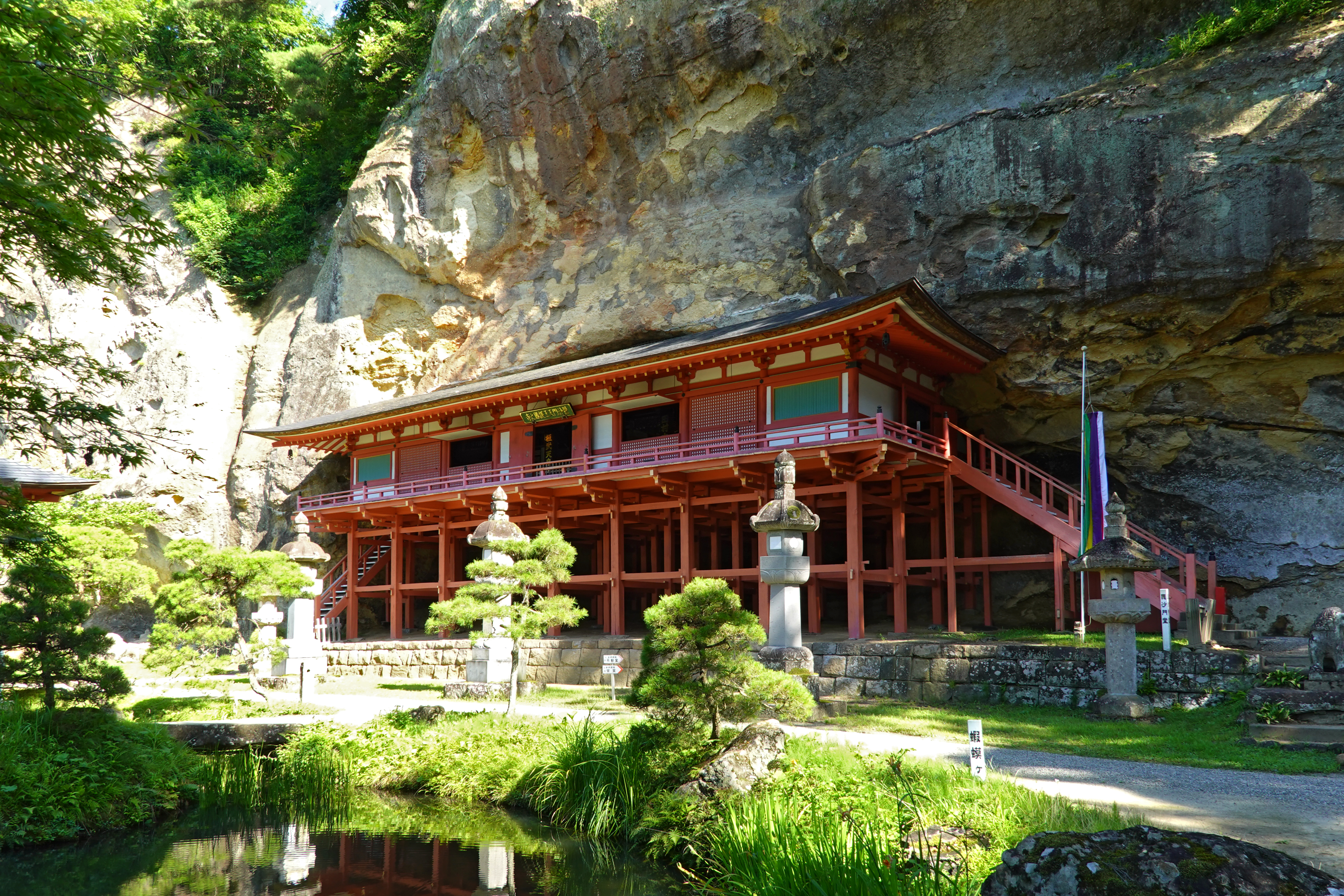
- Takkoku no Iwaya

- Location within Iwate Prefecture Location within Japan

Religion
- Affiliation: Buddhist
- Deity: Bishamon-ten
- Rite: Tendai
- Status: functional

Location
- Country: Japan
- Interactive map of Takkoku-no-Iwaya
- Coordinates: 38°58′08″N 141°03′29″E

Architecture
- Founder: Sakanoue no Tamuramaro
- Completed: 801 AD

Website
- Official website

Takkoku-no-Iwaya (達谷窟) is a Tendai sect Buddhist temple in Hiraizumi in southern Iwate Prefecture in the Tōhoku region of Japan. Its main image is a stone image of Bishamon-ten. Its formal name is the Takkoku no Iwaya Bishamon-do (達谷窟毘沙門堂). The grounds have been designated a National Historic Site since 2005

== Overview ==
Takkoku-no-Iwaya is located approximately six kilometers southwest of Hiraizumi, between the center of town and Genbikei ravine. The temple is built below an overhanging cliff, and incorporates a shallow cave containing a bas-relief statue of Bishamon-ten. In the Heian period, a large statue of Fudō Myōō (designated an Iwate Prefectural Cultural Property) and a bas-relief image of Buddha carved into the rock face were added.

The temple claims to have been founded by the imperial dynasty Chinjufu-shōgun Sakanoue no Tamuramaro in 801 AD to commemorate his victory over the local Emishi tribes, who had used this cave as a fortification. The temple was described in the Kamakura period chronicle, Azuma Kagami.

The temple has burned down many times and its original form is unknown today; the current building dates from 1961 and was modeled after the famous Kiyomizu-dera in Kyoto.

Takkoku-no-Iwaya was included in the original 2006 nomination of "Hiraizumi - Cultural Landscape Associated with Pure Land Buddhist Cosmology", but was removed from the nomination after the failure to secure inscription in 2008; although there are continuing efforts to secure its inclusion through future extension.

== See also ==
- List of Historic Sites of Japan (Iwate)
- Historic Monuments and Sites of Hiraizumi
