= Muryōkō-in =

Former temple in Iwate Prefecture, Japan

- 無量光院跡
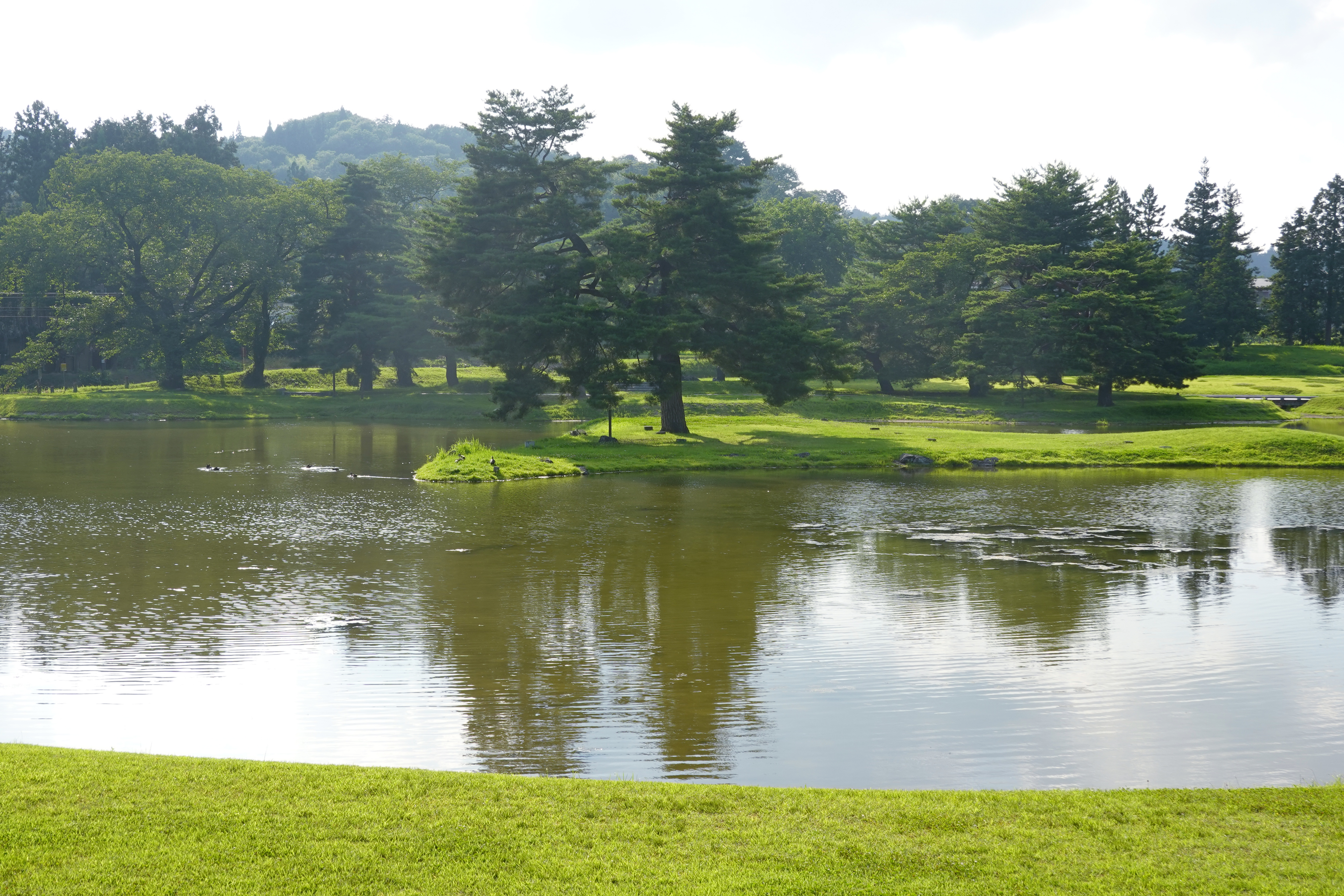
- Muryōkō-in ruins Hiraizumi

- Muryōkō-in Muryōkō-in (Japan)

Religion
- Affiliation: Buddhist
- Status: ruins

Location
- Country: Japan
- Interactive map of Muryōkō-in
- Coordinates: 38°59′34″N 141°06′56″E

Architecture
- Founder: Fujiwara no Hidehira
- UNESCO World Heritage Site
- Type: Cultural
- Criteria: ii, iv
- Designated: 2011
- Reference no.: 1277

Muryōkō-in (無量光院跡) is former temple in Hiraizumi in what is now southern Iwate Prefecture in the Tōhoku region of Japan. The site is designated as both a Special Place of Scenic Beauty and a Special National Historic Site.

== Overview ==
Muryōkō-in was built by Fujiwara no Hidehira, the third of the Northern Fujiwara rulers of Hiraizumi. It was designed to imitate the Phoenix Hall of Byōdō-in in Uji, south of Kyoto, but on a larger scale. The temple was described in the Kamakura period chronicle, Azuma Kagami.

Twice a year, the centerline of the hall was aligned with the sun setting behind Mount Kinkeisan to the west, creating an image of the Pure Land . Nothing remains of the temple today except for some foundation stones and the remnants of earthen walls. The twelfth-century garden with pond, island and ornamental stones has been reconstructed and was designated a Special Historic Site

The temple area is about 240 meters east-west by 270 meters north-south. Although part of the site was destroyed by railway construction, the foundation stones and garden remained. As a result of a survey in 1952, it was determined that the main hall was a five by four bay hall, and that there were at least three more buildings. There are few temple ruins from the latter half of the Heian period, and the Muryōkō-in ruins are considered to have high academic value. In 2011, the site was designed part of the UNESCO World Heritage Site Historic Monuments and Sites of Hiraizumi.

The ruins are approximately minutes on foot from Hiraizumi Station on the JR East Tohoku Main Line.

== See also ==
- World Heritage Sites in Japan
- List of Historic Sites of Japan (Iwate)
