= List of World Heritage Sites in Japan =

The United Nations Educational, Scientific and Cultural Organization (UNESCO) World Heritage Sites are places of importance to cultural or natural heritage as described in the UNESCO World Heritage Convention, established in 1972. Cultural heritage consists of monuments (such as architectural works, monumental sculptures, or inscriptions), groups of buildings, and sites (including archaeological sites). Natural heritage consists of natural features (physical and biological formations), geological and physiographical formations (including habitats of threatened species of animals and plants), and natural sites which are important from the point of view of science, conservation, or natural beauty. Japan accepted the UNESCO World Heritage Convention on 30 June 1992.

There are 27 sites listed in Japan, with a further three sites on the tentative list. Japan's first entries to the list took place in 1993, when four sites were inscribed. The most recent site, the Ancient Capitals of Asuka and Fujiwara, was listed in 2026. Among the sites, 22 are listed for their cultural and five for their natural significance. One site is transnational: The Architectural Work of Le Corbusier is shared with six other countries. Japan has served on the World Heritage Committee four times.

Location of World Heritage Sites within Japan. The Ogasawara Islands are not shown.

== World Heritage Sites ==
UNESCO lists sites under ten criteria; each entry must meet at least one of the criteria. Criteria i through vi are cultural, and vii through x are natural.

* Transnational site

World Heritage Sites
Site	Image	Location (prefecture)	Year listed	UNESCO data	Description
Buddhist Monuments in the Hōryū-ji Area	A wooden Buddhist temple with a pagoda behind	Nara	1993	660; i, ii, iv, vi (cultural)	This site comprises 48 Buddhist monuments in the Hōryū-ji (pictured) and Hokki-ji temple areas. Some of the buildings date to the 7th and 8th centuries. They were constructed shortly after the introduction of Buddhism to Japan and are among the oldest surviving wooden buildings in the world. The architecture of the monuments reflects the adaptation of Chinese influences and the subsequent development of a distinct Japanese style.
Himeji-jō	A castle complex with several roofs, in white color with wooden details	Hyōgo	1993	661; i, iv (cultural)	Himeji Castle is the best example of the early 17th century Japanese castle architecture. The complex comprises keeps, walls, and connecting structure. It is made of wood and white plastered earthen walls. The characteristic feature of the main keep is the multiple roof layers. Even though the complex has undergone several repair campaigns, the integrity of the main features has remained intact.
Yakushima	Primeval forest with lots of moss on the trees and ground	Kagoshima	1993	662; vii, ix (natural)	Yakushima is an island about 60 km (37 mi) south of Kyushu. Due to its location and the fact that it has mountains reaching almost 2,000 m (6,600 ft) above sea level, it has a vertical sequence of plant communities that is rare in the Northern Hemisphere. They include subtropical coastal vegetation, montane temperate rainforest, and high moorland and bamboo forest at the highest elevations. The island is rich in biodiversity. There are numerous Japanese cedar trees, some of which are over 1,000 years old. About a fifth of the island is protected.
Shirakami-Sanchi	Mountain area covered by forest	Aomori, Akita	1993	663; ix (natural)	The property covers a mountainous area with some of the last and largest remainders of the Japanese beech old-growth forests, a type of forest that used to cover the mountains of northern Japan following the Last Glacial Period. The area is home to the Japanese black bear, Japanese macaque, Japanese serow, and black woodpecker.
Historic Monuments of Ancient Kyoto (Kyoto, Uji and Otsu Cities)	A golden-painted Buddhist temple in front of a pond	Kyoto, Shiga	1994	688; ii, iv (cultural)	Kyoto served as the capital of Japan from its founding in 794 until the mid-19th century. It was also a cultural centre, crucial for the development of religious and secular architecture, in particular in wood, of the country. The designs of Japanese gardens have had a profound influence worldwide from the 19th century on. The site comprises 17 properties, including Kinkaku-ji (pictured), Ginkaku-ji, Ryōan-ji, and Kiyomizu-dera.
Historic Villages of Shirakawa-gō and Gokayama	Rural landscape with houses with thatched roofs	Gifu, Toyama	1995	734; iv, v (cultural)	This site comprises three villages in a remote mountain region, where the economy centred around growing of mulberry trees and rearing of silkworms. The villages are characterized by the Gassho-style houses featuring steeply pitched thatched roofs.
Hiroshima Peace Memorial (Genbaku Dome)	Ruins of a building with a dome	Hiroshima	1996	775; vi (cultural)	The Peace Memorial centres around the ruins of the only building left standing after the detonation of the first atomic bomb over of Hiroshima on 6 August 1945. Originally constructed in 1914, it was the Hiroshima Prefectural Industrial Promotional Hall. The memorial commemorates the devastation caused by humanity's most destructive weapons while simultaneously expressing hope for world peace.
Itsukushima Shinto Shrine	A red-painted torii gate in shallow water	Hiroshima	1996	776; i, ii, iv, vi (cultural)	Itsukushima Shrine is a sacred place of Shinto, an ancient Japanese religion that centres on polytheistic nature worship. The shrine was established by the military leader Taira no Kiyomori in the 12th century. The architecture reflects the styles of the late 12th and early 13th centuries, and although the complex has been reconstructed twice, it preserves the original styles. A notable feature of the shrine is its coastal setting, framed by mountains, which results in scenic beauty.
Historic Monuments of Ancient Nara	A wooden Buddhist temple with a pagoda behind	Nara	1998	870; ii, iii, iv, vi (cultural)	Nara was the capital of Japan during the Nara period between 710 and 784, a period of profound political and cultural changes. This site comprises five Buddhist temples (Kōfuku-ji pictured), a Shinto shrine, the remains of the Nara Palace, and the surrounding cultural landscape including the Kasugayama Primeval Forest. The monuments demonstrate cultural influences from China and Korea on subsequent stylistic developments.
Shrines and Temples of Nikkō	A wooden polychrome carving of three wise monkeys on one of the walls of the temple complex	Tochigi	1999	913; i, iv, vi (cultural)	The sacred mountains of Nikkō contain more than a hundred Buddhist and Shinto religious buildings. The first were constructed in the 8th century and many date to the 17th century. The layout of the complex follows the Shinto perception of the relationship between men and nature. The buildings are associated with important chapters of Japanese history and feature numerous artworks. The carving of the three wise monkeys at the Nikkō Tōshō-gū shrine, dedicated to Tokugawa Ieyasu, is pictured.
Gusuku Sites and Related Properties of the Kingdom of Ryukyu	A richly decorated castle painted in red	Okinawa	2000	972; ii, iii, vi (cultural)	The group of monuments dates from the Ryukyu Kingdom period, spanning 12th to 17th centuries. The characteristic feature of the period are gusuku. fortified castles that evolved from earlier stone enclosures around villages. The islands maintained trade and cultural connections with Japan, China, Korea, and Southeast Asia, which is reflected in the monuments. Five gusuku sites, two related monuments, and two related cultural landscapes are listed. Shuri Castle is pictured.
Sacred Sites and Pilgrimage Routes in the Kii Mountain Range	A temple with a red-painted two-storey pagoda	Wakayama, Nara, Mie	2004	1142bis; ii, iii, iv, vi (cultural)	The mountains of the Kii Peninsula are home to sacred sites for Buddhism and Shinto religions with a well-documented tradition of sacred mountains spanning over 1200 years. A network of pilgrimage routes, shrines, and temples shapes the cultural landscape. The architecture of the religious sites influenced sites in other parts of the country. A temple on the top of Mount Kōya is pictured. A minor boundary modification took place in 2016.
Shiretoko	A Steller's sea eagle on snow and ice	Hokkaido	2005	1193; ix, x (natural)	This site comprises part of the Shiretoko Peninsula and the surrounding marine area. Sea ice occurs in winter at the lowest latitude in the Northern Hemisphere. Highly productive seas supply the complex food webs and sustain a number of marine and terrestrial species. The area is home to Steller's sea eagle (pictured), Blakiston's fish owl, Japanese black bear, as well as several species of salmonid fish, seals, and cetaceans.
Iwami Ginzan Silver Mine and its Cultural Landscape	Several houses under a hill covered by trees	Shimane	2007	1246bis; ii, iii, v (cultural)	The Iwami Ginzan was a large silver mine that was active between the 16th and 20th centuries. During the Age of Discovery, silver contributed to a substantial exchange between Japan and other Eurasian countries, while the political isolation during the Edo period prevented the introduction of the mining techniques developed in Europe during the Industrial Revolution. Mining focused on small-scale labour-intense units. The remains of mining settlements (Ōmori Ginzan village pictured), smelting and refining sites, and ports to transport the ore have been preserved. A minor boundary modification of the site took place in 2010.
Hiraizumi – Temples, Gardens and Archaeological Sites Representing the Buddhist Pure Land	Landscape with pond and temples	Iwate	2011	1277rev; ii, vi (cultural)	Hiraizumi was the administrative centre of the realm of the Northern Fujiwara clan in the 11th and 12th centuries. The realm rivaled Kyoto commercially and politically, but much of the area was destroyed in 1189 after Hiraizumi lost its political status. The site comprises four gardens and the area of Mount Kinkeizan. The gardens follow the concepts of Pure Land Buddhism, representing the pure land of Buddha. The design was also influenced by the native Shinto religion and in turn influenced temples in other parts of Japan. Mōtsū-ji is pictured.
Ogasawara Islands	Island with some low vegetation	Tokyo	2011	1362; ix (natural)	The Ogasawara Archipelago is a group of around 30 islands located in the north-western Pacific Ocean around 1,000 km (620 mi) off the Japanese mainland. Because of its isolation, the islands have a high number of endemic species and are important for studies of ongoing evolutionary processes and speciation. The islands are home to 195 endangered bird species, the critically endangered Bonin flying fox, and over four hundred native plant taxa. The surrounding waters support numerous species of fish, cetaceans, and corals.
Fujisan, sacred place and source of artistic inspiration	Mount Fuji, a snow-capped volcanic cone	Shizuoka, Yamanashi	2013	1418; iii, vi (cultural)	Mount Fuji is a solitary stratovolcano with a height of 3,776 m (12,388 ft). The scenic beauty of the often snow-capped mountain has served as an inspiration for artists through centuries, especially for the woodblock prints of Hokusai, which had a profound influence on Western art. The mountain is also sacred in the Buddhist and Shinto traditions and there are numerous pilgrimage paths and shrines on the mountain slopes.
Tomioka Silk Mill and Related Sites	Interior of a historical silk factory	Gunma	2014	1449; ii, iv (cultural)	Tomioka Silk Mill illustrates the transition of Japan into a modern industrialized nation in the late 19th and early 20th centuries. During the early Meiji era, the government brought French machinery and expertise to a region with traditional ties to silk production in order to start industrial production. This made Japan a major world exporter of raw silk. It also made Tomioka a centre of technological innovation.
Sites of Japan's Meiji Industrial Revolution: Iron and Steel, Shipbuilding and Coal Mining	Coal mining shaft and a brick building	several sites	2015	1484; ii, iv (cultural)	During the Meiji era of the second half of the 19th century, Japan developed industry, such as iron and steel production, shipbuilding, and coal mining, with technology transfer from Europe and America. This made Japan the first example of a successful transfer of Western industrialization to a non-Western nation and turned Japan into a world-level industrial power, as well as profoundly changing its society. This site comprises 23 components in eight areas, six of which are in the south-eastern part of the country. Miike coal mine is pictured.
The Architectural Work of Le Corbusier, an Outstanding Contribution to the Modern Movement*	A modernist concrete building with some sculptures in front	Tokyo	2016	1321rev; i, ii, vi (cultural)	This transnational site (shared with Argentina, Belgium, France, Germany, Switzerland, and India) encompasses 17 works of Franco-Swiss architect Le Corbusier. Le Corbusier was an important representative of the 20th-century Modernist movement, which introduced new architectural techniques to meet the needs of the changing society. The National Museum of Western Art (pictured) is listed in Japan.
Sacred Island of Okinoshima and Associated Sites in the Munakata Region	A temple building	Fukuoka	2017	1535; ii, iii (cultural)	The island of Okinoshima, located 60 km (37 mi) off the north-western coast of Kyushu, is worshiped as a sacred island and was a place of rituals associated with maritime safety between the 4th and 9th centuries by people from Japan, Korea, and the Asian continent, during the period of formation of Japanese identity. Votive objects deposited on the island provide insight into how these rituals were changing through time and how the cultural exchange was taking place. The site also comprises properties on Kyushu, where "distant worship" takes place. The Munakata Taisha shrine is pictured.
Hidden Christian Sites in the Nagasaki Region	A church with white facade and blue windows	Nagasaki, Kumamoto	2018	1495; iii (cultural)	This site comprises 12 components related to Christianity in Japan. Although the religion was banned during the Edo period between the 17th and 19th centuries, hidden Christian communities survived in small villages in the northwestern part of Kyushu. They gave rise to a specific tradition that appeared vernacular but kept the ideas of the Christian faith. When the ban was lifted in 1873, Christian communities saw revitalization. The Ōura Church is pictured.
Mozu-Furuichi Kofungun, Ancient Tumulus Clusters	Aerial photo of a keyhole-shaped tumulus	Osaka	2019	1593bis; iii, iv (cultural)	This site comprises 49 burial mounds, called kofun. There are over 160,000 such tombs in Japan and the selected ones are the most representative. They date to the Kofun period from the 3rd to the 6th centuries. These mounds have geometric shapes, such as keyhole, square, or circle. Some have moats around them and several contained grave goods and clay figure decorations. Daisen-Kofun in Osaka is pictured. A minor boundary modification of the site took place in 2023.
Amami-Ōshima Island, Tokunoshima Island, northern part of Okinawa Island, and Iriomote Island	A flightless bird with red legs and red beak	Kagoshima, Okinawa	2021	1574; x (natural)	This site comprises protected areas in four islands, Amami Ōshima, Iriomote, Tokunoshima, and the northern part of Okinawa Island. The islands became separated from the mainland in the late Miocene epoch, resulting in isolation of terrestrial species that have since formed a unique biota, rich in biodiversity. Endemic species include the Okinawa rail (pictured), Iriomote cat, Amami rabbit, and Ryukyu long-tailed giant rat.
Jōmon Prehistoric Sites in Northern Japan	Reconstruction of a wooden structure and houses	Hokkaidō, Aomori, Iwate, Akita	2021	1632; iii, v (cultural)	This site comprises 17 archaeological sites from the Jōmon period, spanning roughly from 13,000 BCE to 400 BCE. The Jōmon people were a sedentary society that practiced hunter-gathering and fishing in a resource-rich environment. They developed pottery and created particular ceramic figures called dogū. Archaeological remains include earthen mounds, stone circles, and ritual deposits. A reconstruction of a settlement at the Sannai-Maruyama Site is pictured.
Sado Island Gold Mines	A board with text in Japanese, a hill covered with trees in the background	Niigata	2024	1698; iv (cultural)	This site comprises a heritage of gold and silver mines on the Sado Island over 250 years during the Tokugawa shogunate. The island is of a volcanic origin and has gold and silver either in veins or in placer deposits. They were extracted using non-mechanized traditional techniques. People working in the mines came from all parts of Japan and formed their unique culture.
Ancient Capitals of Asuka and Fujiwara	Asuka Palace Ruins	Nara	2026	1757; ii, iii (cultural)	This nomination comprises historical sites from the Asuka period, centred around the city of Asuka which served as the capital of Japan before being moved to Nara in 710. Tombs, temples, and the remains of palaces and residential buildings illustrate the culture and life of the period. The Asuka Palace ruins are pictured. Other sites include the Ishibutai Kofun, Kitora Tomb, Kawara-dera, and Yamato Sanzan.

== Tentative list ==
In addition to sites inscribed on the World Heritage List, member states can maintain a list of tentative sites that they may consider for nomination. Nominations for the World Heritage List are only accepted if the site was previously listed on the tentative list. Japan maintains three properties on its tentative list.

Tentative sites
Site	Image	Location (prefecture)	Year listed	UNESCO criteria	Description
Temples, Shrines and other structures of Ancient Kamakura	A large Buddha statue in bronze with visitors in front	Kanagawa	1992	i, ii, iii, iv, vi (cultural)	During the samurai rule of Japan, from 1192 to 1868, Kamakura and Edo served as administrative centres of the country. Today, only Kamakura preserves the monument ensembles reminiscent of samurai culture. Monuments include temples and shrines, such as Kōtoku-in (The Great Buddha of Kamakura pictured), Tsurugaoka Hachimangū, Jufuku-ji, and Kenchō-ji.
Hikone-jō (castle)	A Japanese castle with many roofs	Shiga	1992	i, ii, iii, iv (cultural)	The castle is an example of the Japanese castle architecture from the early 17th century with several components well preserved. It retains the central castle tower (pictured), defensive structures, residential parts, and surrounding defensive moats. Parts of the complex are now used as museums.
Hiraizumi – Temples, Gardens and Archaeological Sites Representing the Buddhist Pure Land (extension)	A Buddhist temple in red	Iwate	2012	ii, iii, vi (cultural)	This is a proposed extension to the already listed site of Hiraizumi. The nomination focuses on the archaeological remains of religious structures that were laid out deliberately in accordance with the principles of Pure Land Buddhism.

== See also ==
- List of Intangible Cultural Heritage elements in Japan
- Cultural Properties of Japan
- National Treasures of Japan
- Cultural Landscapes of Japan
- National parks of Japan
