= Historic Monuments and Sites of Hiraizumi =

UNESCO World Heritage Site in Japan

Hiraizumi – Temples, Gardens and Archaeological Sites Representing the Buddhist Pure Land
UNESCO World Heritage Site
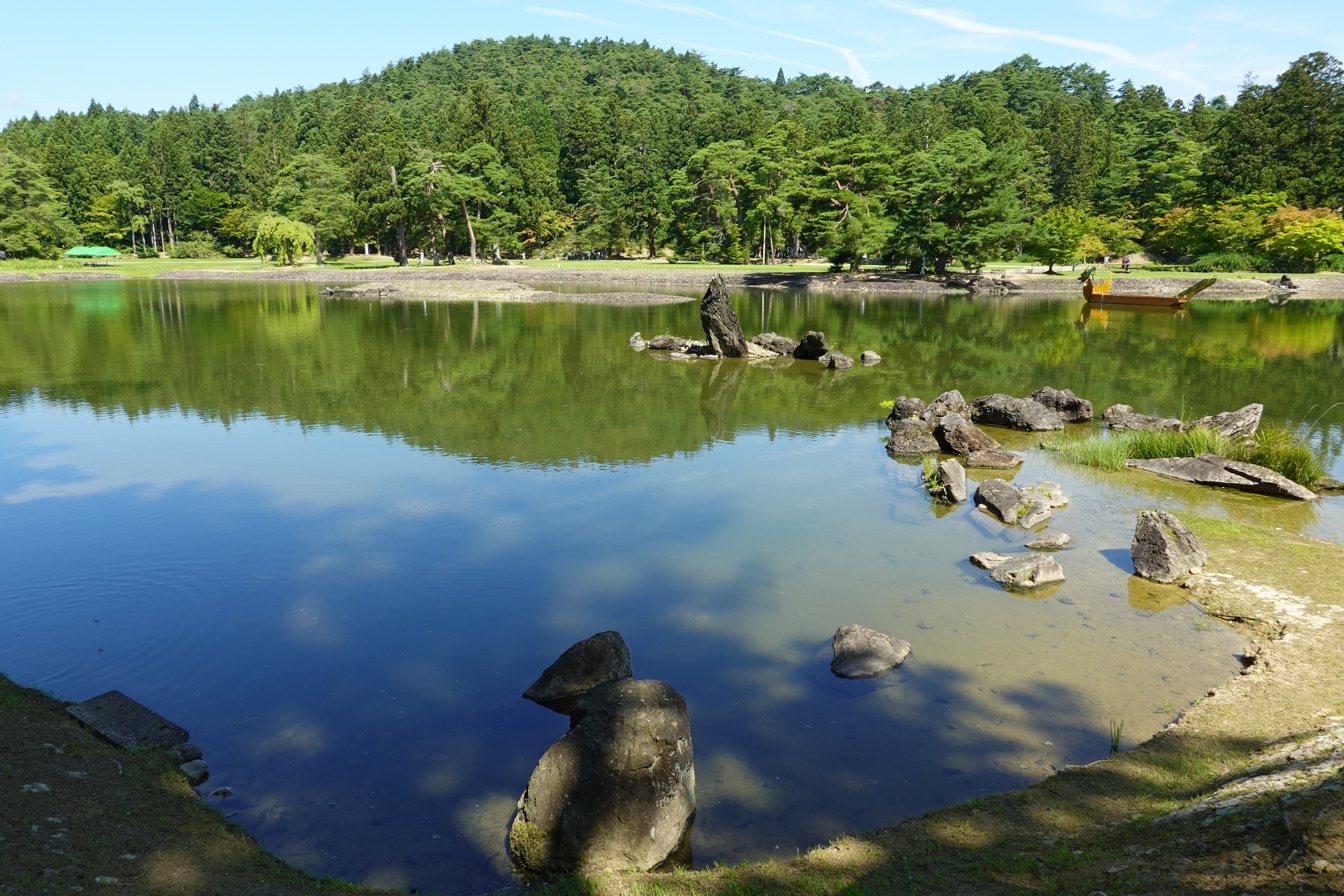
- Pure Land Garden of Mōtsū-ji

- Location within Japan
- Location: Hiraizumi, Nishiiwai District, Iwate Prefecture, Japan
- Criteria: Cultural: (ii), (vi)
- Reference: 1277rev
- Inscription: 2011 (35th Session)
- Area: 176.2 ha (435 acres)
- Buffer zone: 6,008 ha (14,850 acres)
- Coordinates: 39°0′4″N 141°6′28″E

Hiraizumi – Temples, Gardens and Archaeological Sites Representing the Buddhist Pure Land is a grouping of five sites from late eleventh- and twelfth-century Hiraizumi, Iwate Prefecture, Japan. The serial nomination was inscribed on the UNESCO World Heritage List in 2011, under criteria ii and vi.

== Hiraizumi ==
From around 1087, when Fujiwara no Kiyohira—founder of the Northern Fujiwara clan, which ruled much of Tōhoku—moved his headquarters and residence southward after the Gosannen War, until 1189, when the clan was destroyed by the army of Minamoto no Yoritomo in the Genpei War, Hiraizumi served for four generations as the Northern Fujiwara's seat of power and grew to become a major political, military, commercial, and cultural centre in northeastern Japan.

Several major temples associated with Pure Land Buddhism were founded and endowed by the Northern Fujiwara, but the demise of their benefactors and a series of fires contributed to their subsequent decline. When the poet Bashō visited in 1689 he famously wrote of the site in Oku no Hosomichi: summer grass... remains of soldiers' dreams. A series of excavations from the mid-twentieth century onwards combined with references in the Azuma Kagami chronicles, in particular the Bunji-no-chūmon petition of 1189, and the Shōwa sojō or "monks' appeal" of 1313 from the Chūson-ji archives, has contributed much to the understanding of the sites and the period.

== Component sites ==
| Name | Type | Comments | Image | Coords |
|---|---|---|---|---|
| Chūson-ji 中尊寺境内; Chūsonji keidai | Temple | Said to have been founded by Ennin in 850; rebuilt by Fujiwara no Kiyohira at the beginning of the twelfth century with a pagoda and the Daichōju-in, a Great Hall dedicated to Amida. Kiyohira built the temple to placate the souls of all who died in the Former Nine Years War and the Latter Three Years' War. Fires in 1337 consumed many buildings and temple treasures; unusually, the mummified bodies of Kiyohira and his heirs were interred at the Konjikidō, the Hall of Gold dedicated to Amida (pictured; National Treasure); the compound is a Special Historic Site | | 39°00′07″N 141°06′00″E |
| Mōtsū-ji 毛越寺境内; Mōtsūji keidai | Temple | Said to have been founded by Ennin in 850; rebuilt by Fujiwara no Motohira in the twelfth century; its destruction by fire in 1226 was lamented in Azuma Kagami as the loss of a monument 'incomparable in our time'; the twelfth-century paradise garden, with stone-paved stream, pond, pebble beach, peninsula, island, and ornamental stones is a Special Place of Scenic Beauty; the precinct and associated tutelary shrine is a Special Historic Site | | 38°59′26″N 141°06′56″E |
| Kanjizaiō-in Ato 観自在王院跡; Kanjizaiōin ato | Temple | Founded adjacent to Mōtsū-ji with two Amida Halls by the wife of Fujiwara no Motohira in the twelfth century; destroyed by fire in 1573; its twelfth-century paradise garden with stream, pond, pebble beach, island, and waterfall stone arrangement is a Place of Scenic Beauty | | 38°59′17″N 141°06′37″E |
| Muryōkō-in Ato 無量光院跡; Muryōkōin ato | Temple | Founded with a monumental statue of Amida by Fujiwara no Hidehira in the twelfth-century; modelled on Byōdō-in near Kyoto; twelfth-century paradise garden with pond, island and ornamental stones; a Special Historic Site | | 38°59′35″N 141°06′57″E |
| Mount Kinkeisan 金鶏山; Kinkeizan | Mountain | Summit used for sutra burials; remains of a Hall identified as belonging to Zaō Gongen; associated with the cult of Miroku; a historic site | | 38°59′36″N 141°06′33″E |

== Original submission ==
The original 2006 nomination of "Hiraizumi - Cultural Landscape Associated with Pure Land Buddhist Cosmology" included five further sites while omitting that of Kanjizaiō-in as a separate component. Four were removed from the nomination after the failure to secure inscription in 2008; the component site of the Yanagi Palace was excluded from the 2011 inscription, although there are continuing efforts to secure its inclusion through future extension.

| Name | Type | Comments | Image | Coords |
|---|---|---|---|---|
| Yanagi-no-Gosho Site 柳之御所遺跡; Yanagi-no-gosho iseki | Palace | Ruins of the Yanagi (Willow) Palace of the Ōshū Fujiwara clan; a historic site | | 39°00′25″N 141°05′58″E |
| Takkoku-no-Iwaya 達谷窟; Takkoku-no-iwaya | Temple | a historic site in the south-eastern part of Hiraizumi that includes a temple dedicated to Bishamonten, reputed to date back to Sakanoue no Tamuramaro | | 38°58′08″N 141°03′29″E |
| Shirotori-tate Site 白鳥舘遺跡; Shirotori-tate iseki | Japanese castle ruins | Located in Ōshū City north of Hiraizumi; in a strategic spot on the Kitakami River, it is generally believed that it was the site of numerous structures between the 10th and 16th centuries. Exactly what its status was during the reigns of the Abe clan (Fujiwara no Kiyohira's maternal ancestors) and the Ōshū Fujiwara clan is unclear, but as the site of several medieval castle-structures linked to them, it was one of the first to be submitted for consideration by the World Heritage Committee; Historic Site | | 39°01′30″N 141°08′05″E |
| Chōjagahara Haiji Site 長者ヶ原廃寺跡; Chōjagahara Haiji iseki | Temple | Historic Site | | 39°00′46″N 141°05′48″E |
| Honedera-mura Shōen Site 骨寺村荘園遺跡; Honedera-mura shōen iseki | Shōen | Historic Site; the surrounding area is an Important Cultural Landscape | | 38°58′54″N 140°57′06″E |

== Gallery ==
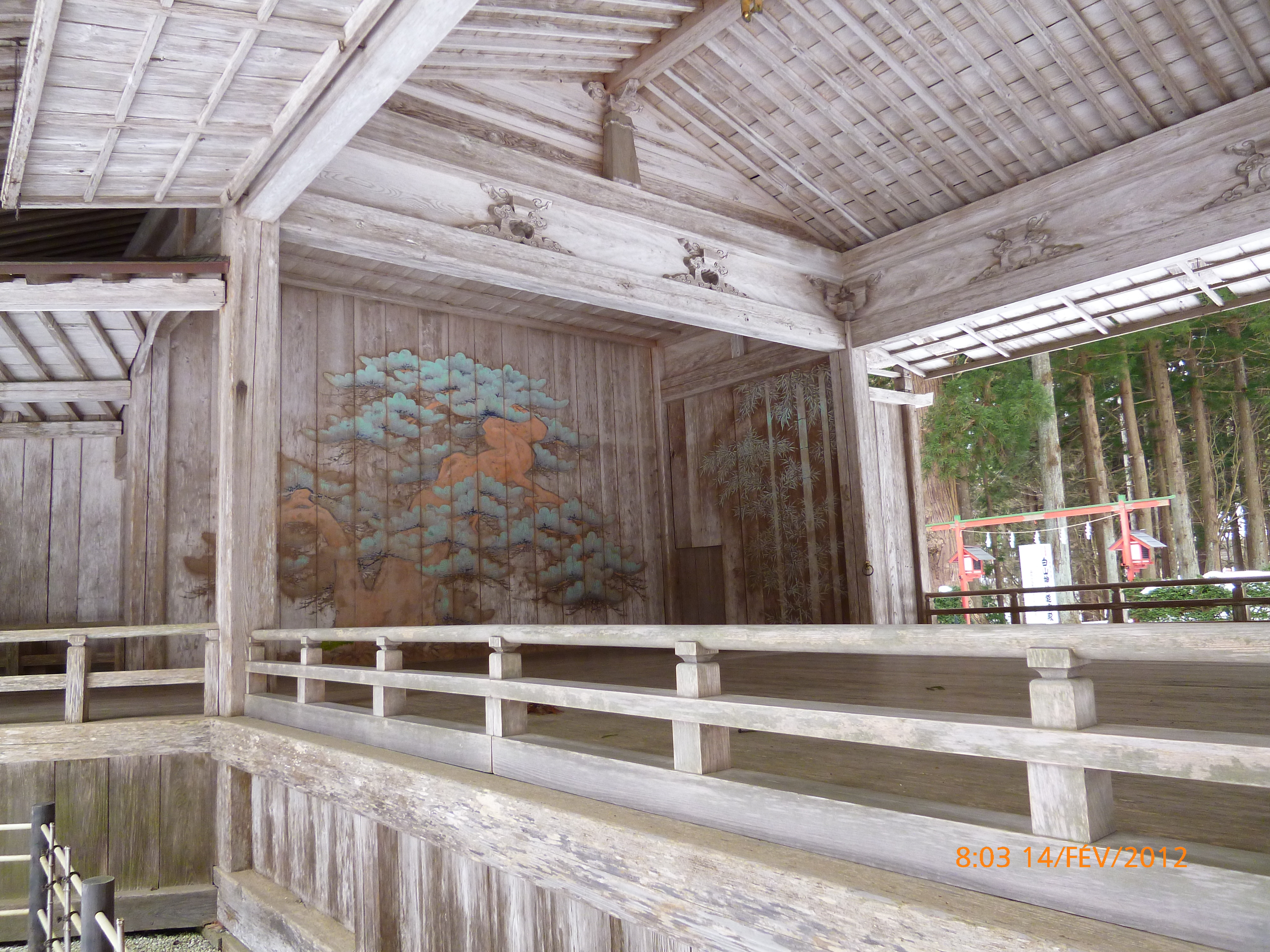
temple interior with mural

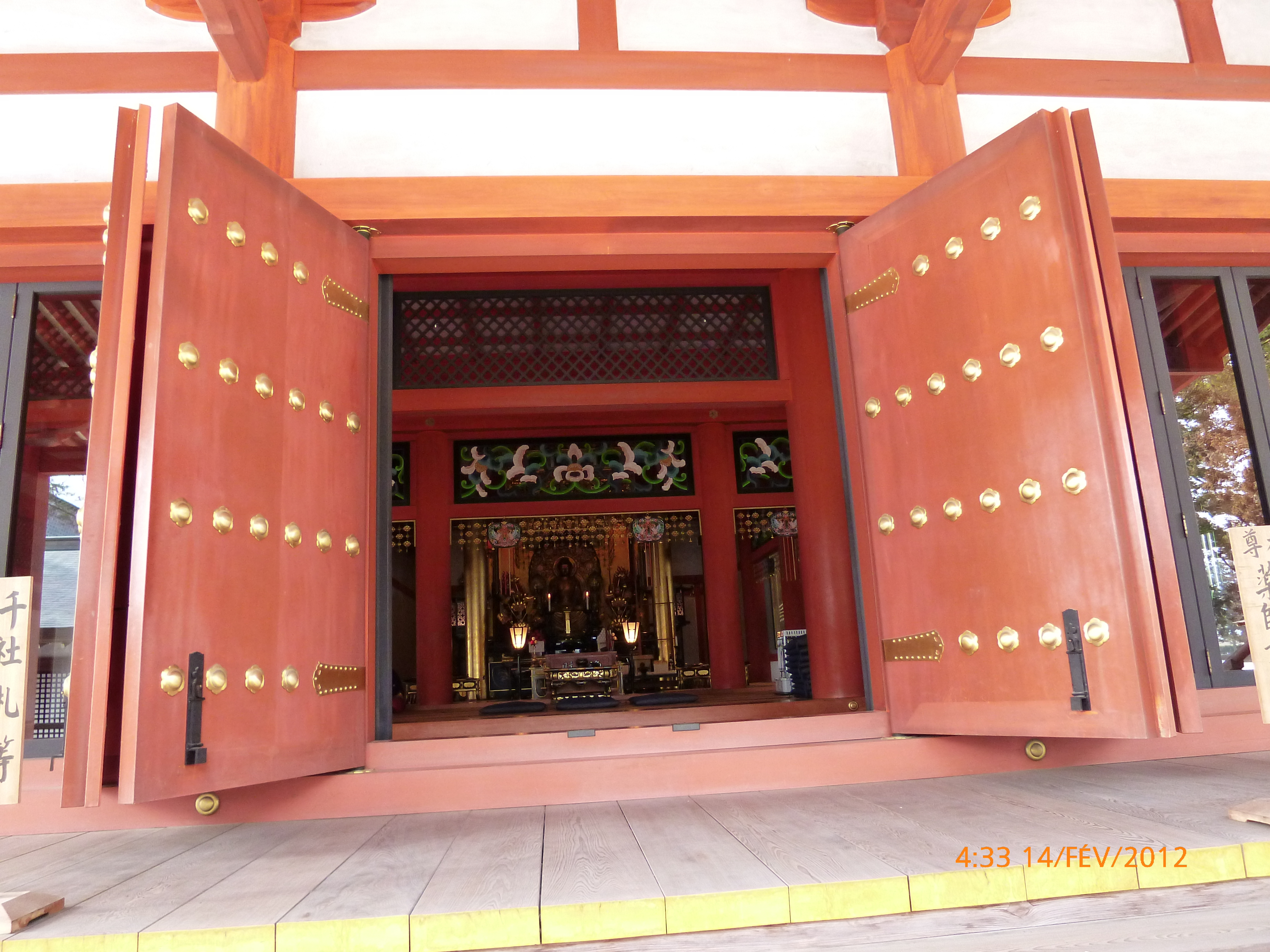
temple gates

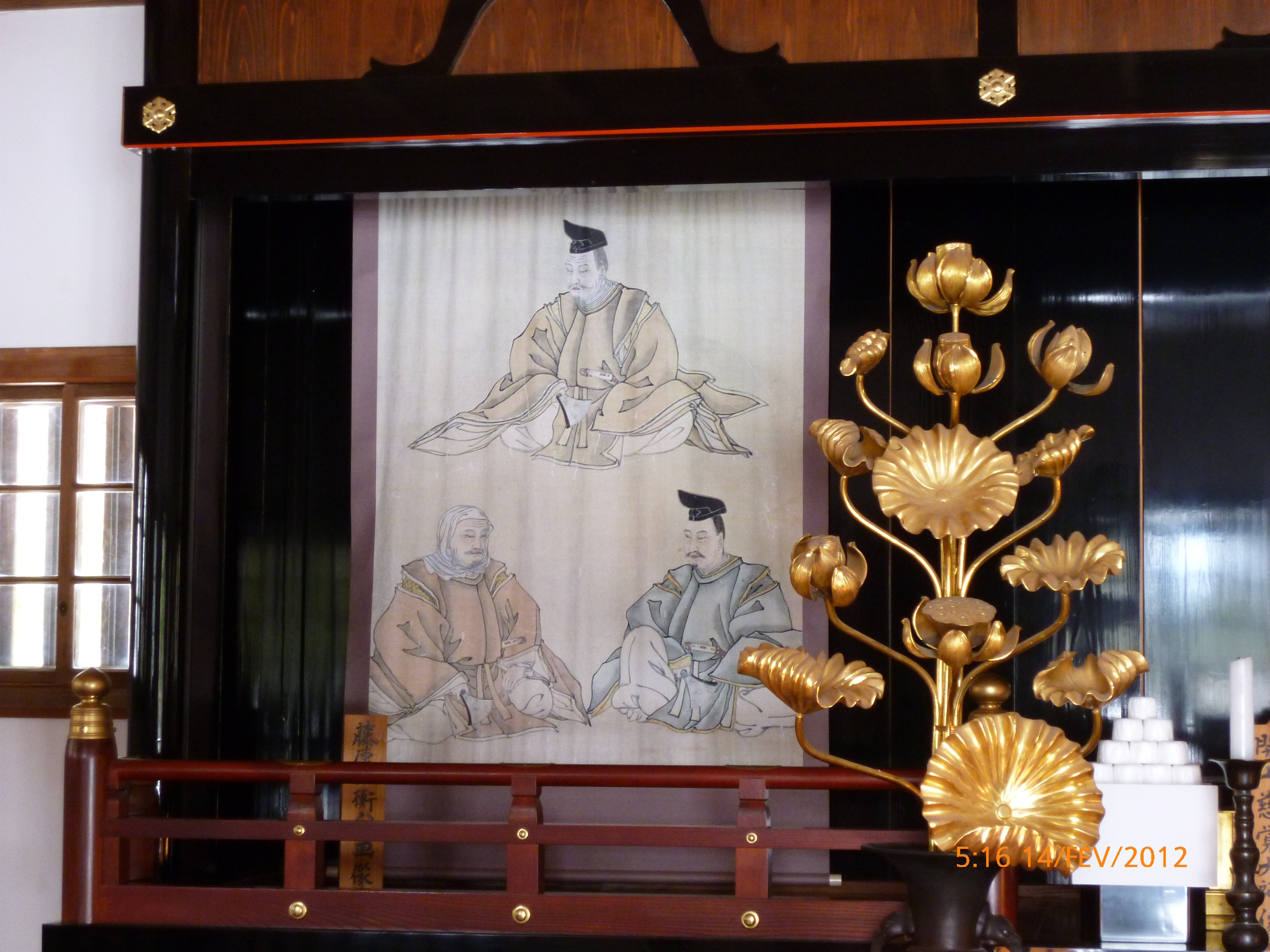
temple screen

== See also ==
- List of National Treasures of Japan (temples)
- List of Historic Sites of Japan (Iwate)
- List of Special Places of Scenic Beauty, Special Historic Sites and Special Natural Monuments
- Pure Land Buddhism
- Japanese gardens
- World Heritage Sites in Japan
