= Mōtsū-ji =

Buddhist temple in Iwate Prefecture, Japan

- 毛越寺
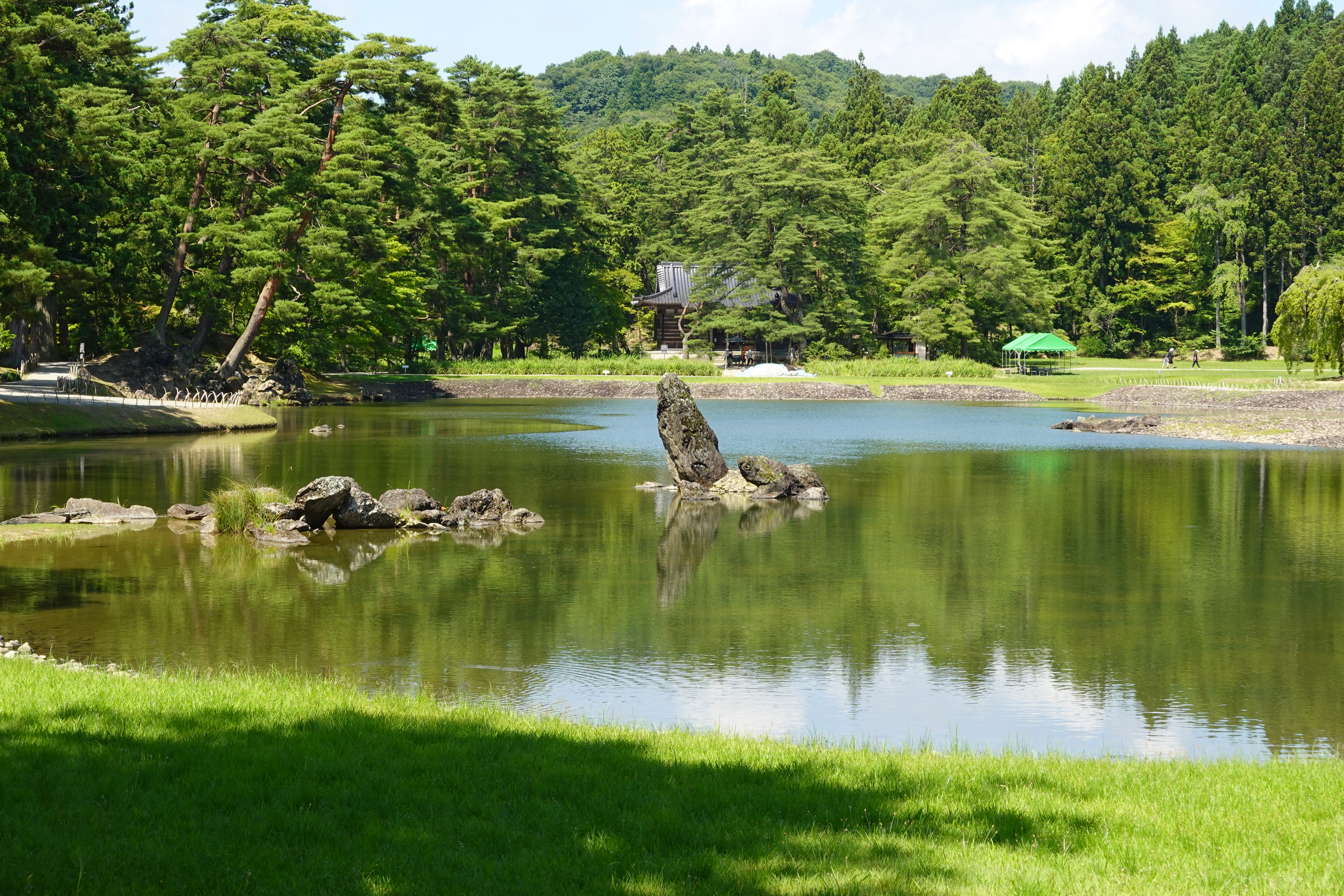
- The Pure Land garden of Mōtsū-ji. The rocks are arranged to represent the rocky coast of Iwate.

- Location within Iwate Prefecture Location within Japan

Religion
- Affiliation: Buddhist
- Deity: Yakushi Nyōrai
- Rite: Tendai
- Status: functional

Location
- Location: 58 Osawa, Hiraizumi-chō, Nishiiwai-gun, Iwate-ken
- Country: Japan
- Coordinates: 38°59′16″N 141°06′29″E

Architecture
- Founder: Ennin
- Completed: 850
- UNESCO World Heritage Site
- Type: Cultural
- Criteria: ii, iv
- Designated: 2011
- Reference no.: 1277

Website
- Official website

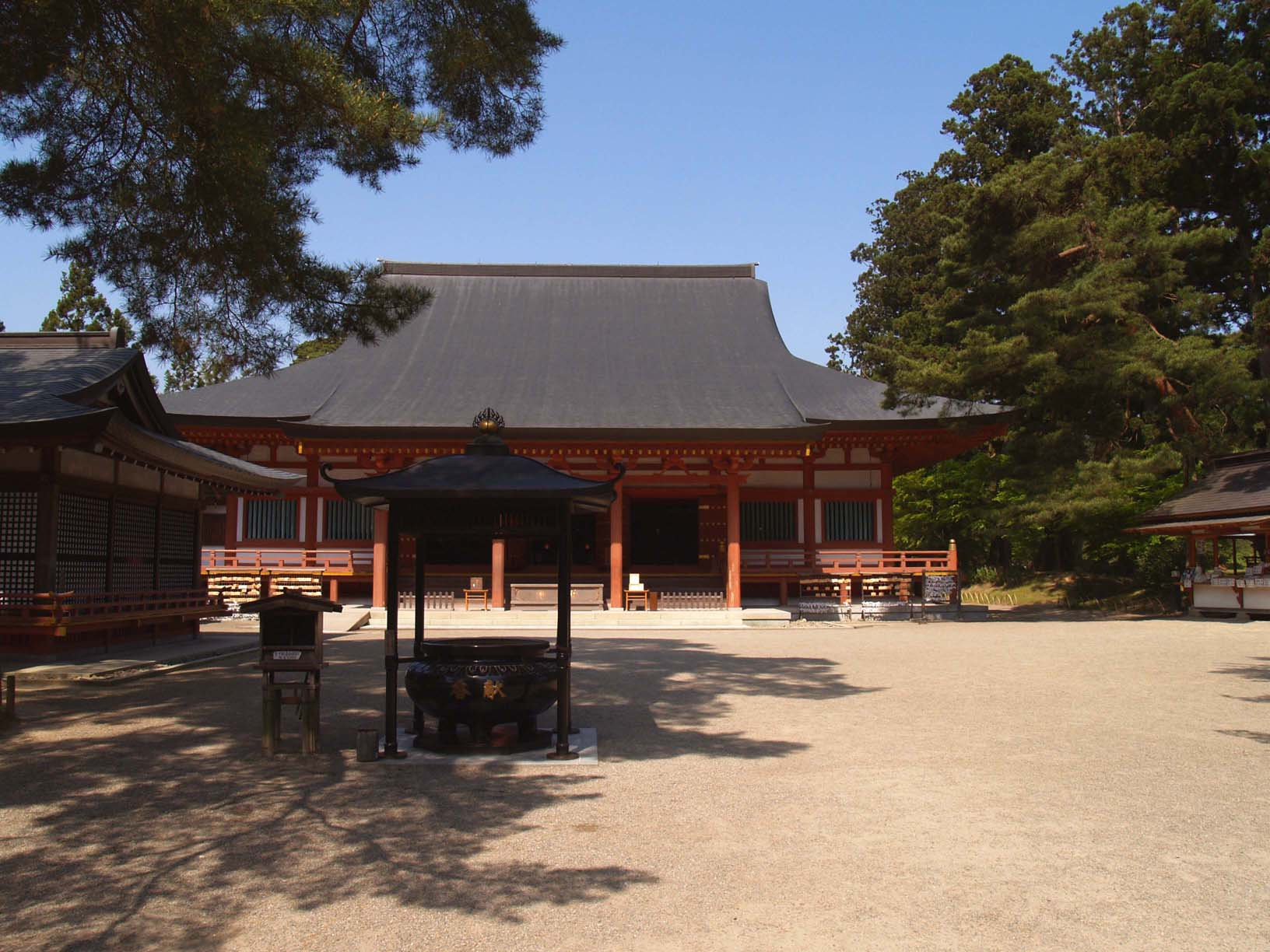
The modern temple of Mōtsū-ji with an incense burner in the foreground

Mōtsū-ji (毛越寺) is a Buddhist temple of the Tendai sect in the town of Hiraizumi in southern Iwate Prefecture, Japan, and also refers to the historic area surrounding it containing the ruins of two older temples, Enryū-ji (圓隆寺) and Kashō-ji (嘉祥寺) in a Jōdo (Pure Land) garden. The current temple was built in the 18th century and bears no relation to the ancient temple structures that once stood here. In June 2011, Mōtsū-ji was listed as a UNESCO World Heritage Site as "Historic Monuments and Sites of Hiraizumi".

== History ==
Mōtsū-ji was founded in 850 by Ennin (Jikaku Daishi). At the time, the area was a frontier between Yamato Japan and the Emishi of the Tōhoku region of northern Honshū.

In the mid-12th century, Fujiwara no Motohira, the second Northern Fujiwara lord, built a temple here called Enryū-ji. There is also a possibility that Motohira's father Fujiwara no Kiyohira built an earlier Enryū-ji on this site before he died in 1128. If so, it is supposed that this original temple was consumed by fire soon after its completion in the war of succession between Motohira and his brother Koretsune. The temple built by Motohira around 1150 would then have been a copy of his father's temple.

Motohira's Enryū-ji must have been spectacular by any standards. The main hall contained a monumental statue of Yakushi Nyōrai, the Buddha of Healing, with monumental statues of the Twelve Divine Generals (Jūni Shinshō), sculpted by Unkei with crystal eyes; an innovation at that time. The hall itself was brightly painted and decorated with precious wood, gold, silver and jewels. The main hall was surrounded by other buildings including a lecture hall, a circumambulation hall, a two-story main gate, a bell tower and a sutra repository. The temple's name placard was written by Fujiwara no Tadamichi (藤原忠通) and the ornamental poem slips by Fujiwara no Norinaga.

At the height of its glory Mōtsū-ji is said to have had 40 buildings and up to 500 subsidiary chapels for meditation, many of which used rare woods and precious materials in their construction, in the manner of nearby Chūson-ji.

Once Enryū-ji was completed Motohira ordered an almost exact copy to be built beside it, Kashō-ji. He did not live to see it completed. His son and heir, Hidehira, accomplished that task. Kashō-ji also contained a monumental statue of Yakushi Nyōrai but the walls were decorated with paintings illustrating the Lotus Sutra.

After the downfall of the Northern Fujiwara clan, all of the buildings were destroyed by fires, either natural or in conflicts, and the temple was completely in ruins by 1226.

== Current status ==
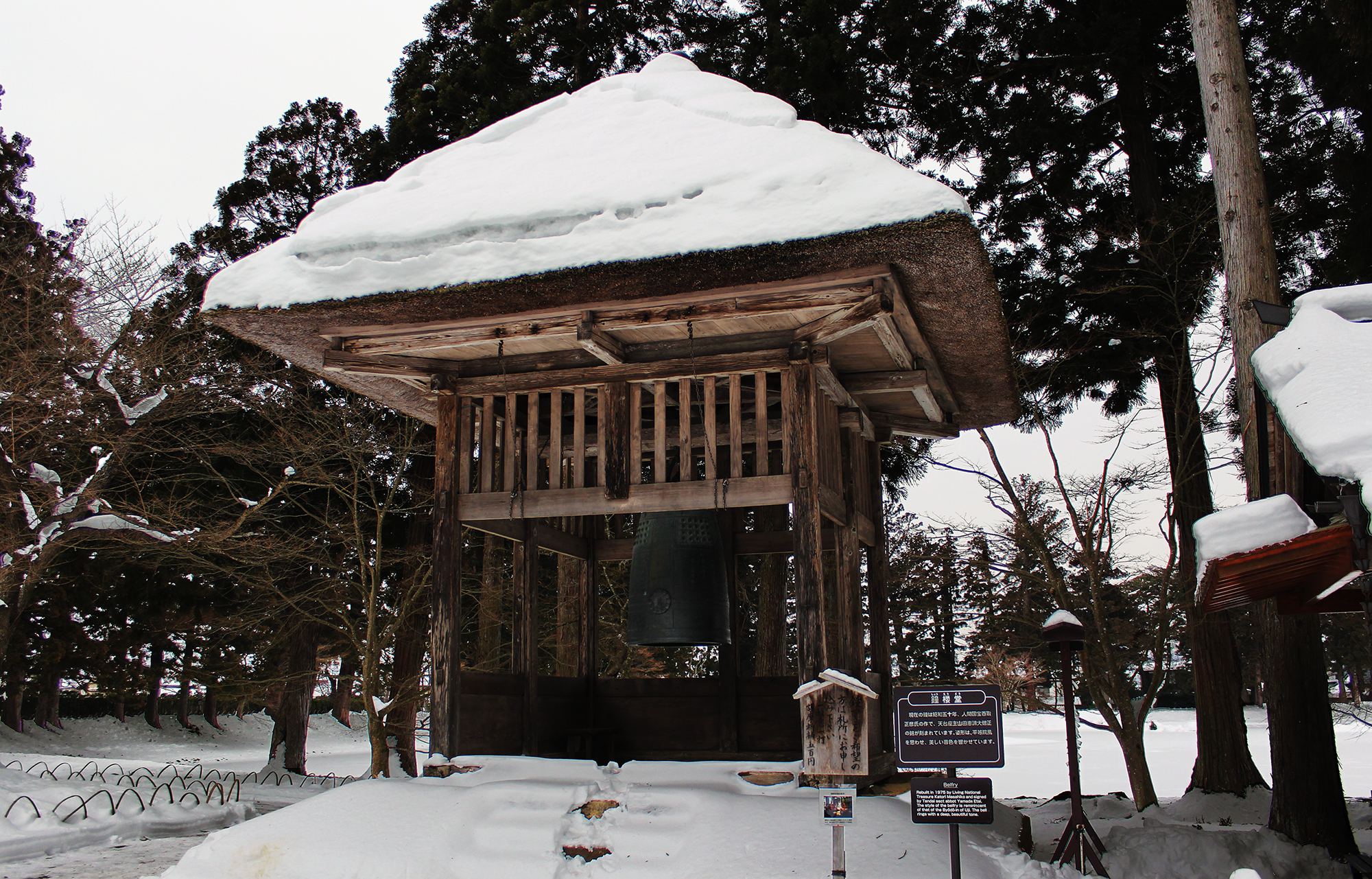
The belfry of Mōtsū-ji

The temple was rebuilt during the Edo period; however, the current structures were not located on the original foundations and are not reconstructions of the original buildings. The current temple buildings consist of a Hondō enshrining a Yakushi Nyōrai, and a Jogyō-dō meditation hall. The Oizumi-ga-ike pond and surrounding Pure Land garden is preserved much as it was 800 years ago. The designer of the garden is unknown, but was clearly familiar with the Sakuteiki (an 11th-century treatise on garden making). The garden consists of a large pond with two islands, one peninsula on the southeast shore, and three on the south shore. On the north shore of the pond are the remains of the original main hall, bell tower and sutra repository. In the original garden, bridges connected this hall with the central island (which was shaped like a magatama) and the great south gate. The shoreline, with its beach, peninsulas and rugged mountain rocks, is thought to represent the seacoast. There are beautiful plantings of cherry trees, irises, lotus, bush clover and maples. Various festivals are held throughout the year.

Mōtsū-ji is designated as both a Special Place of Scenic Beauty and a Special National Historic Site.

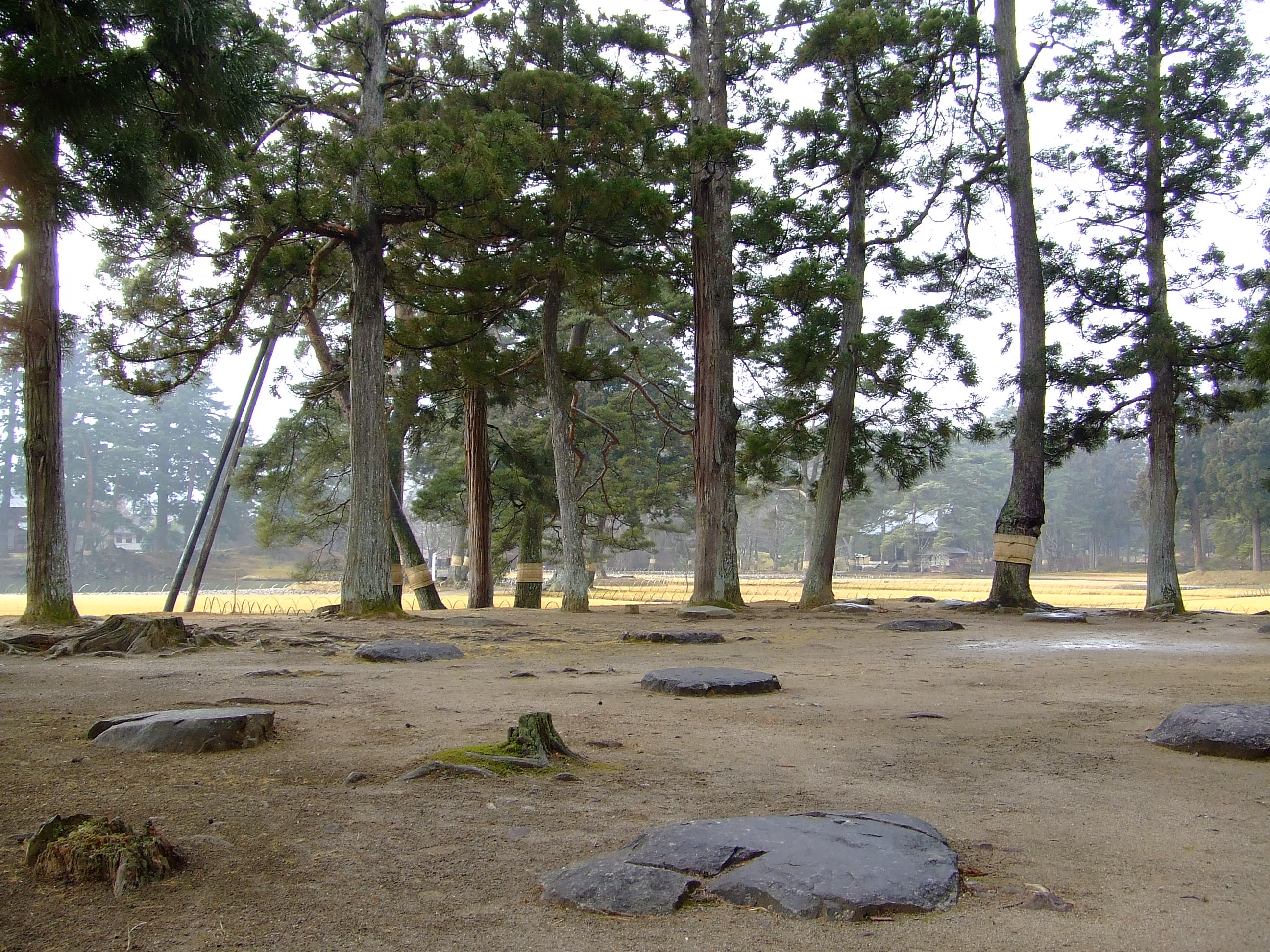
The ruins of Enryū-ji temple.

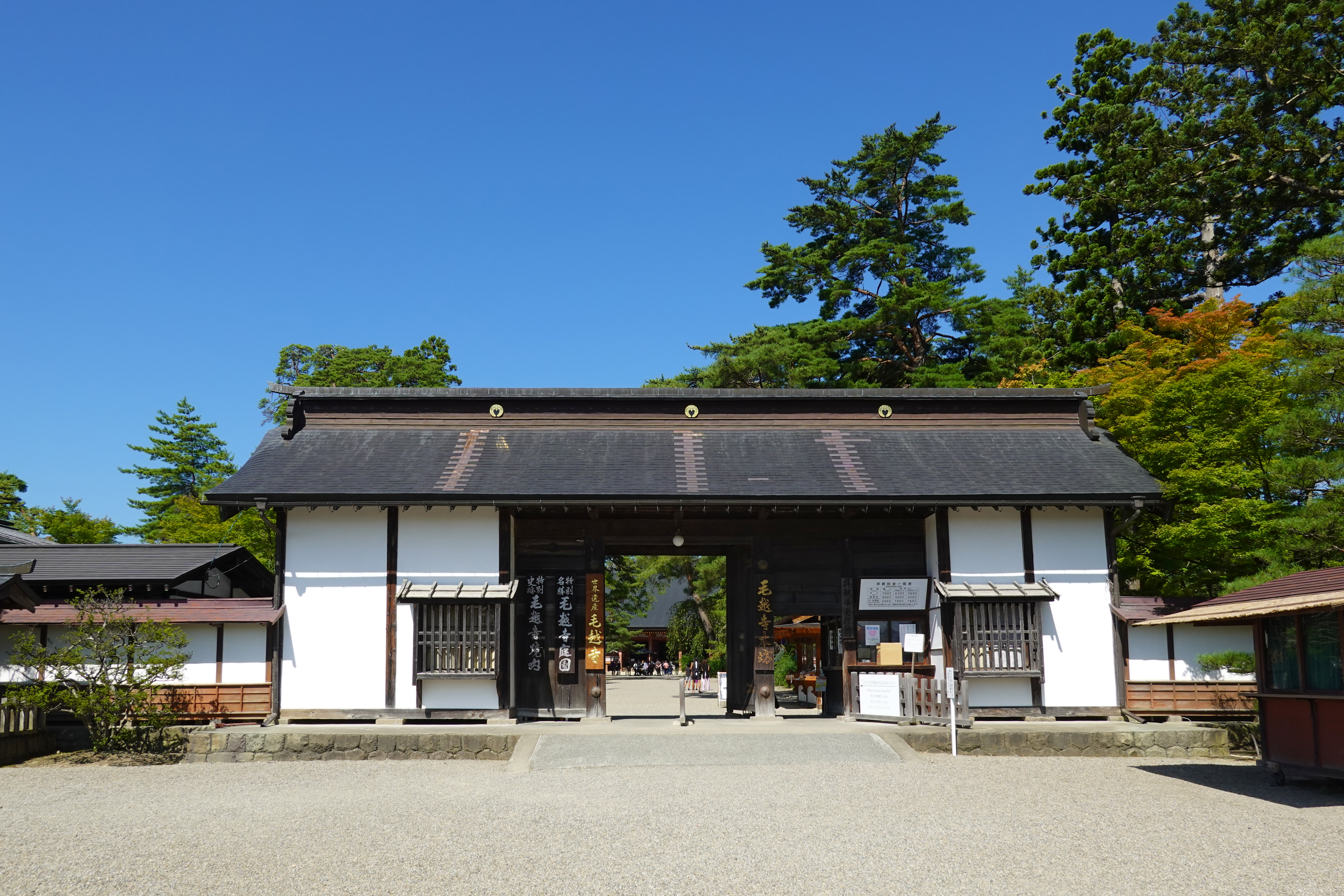
The main gate of Mōtsū-ji. Relocated from Ichinoseki castle in 1921.

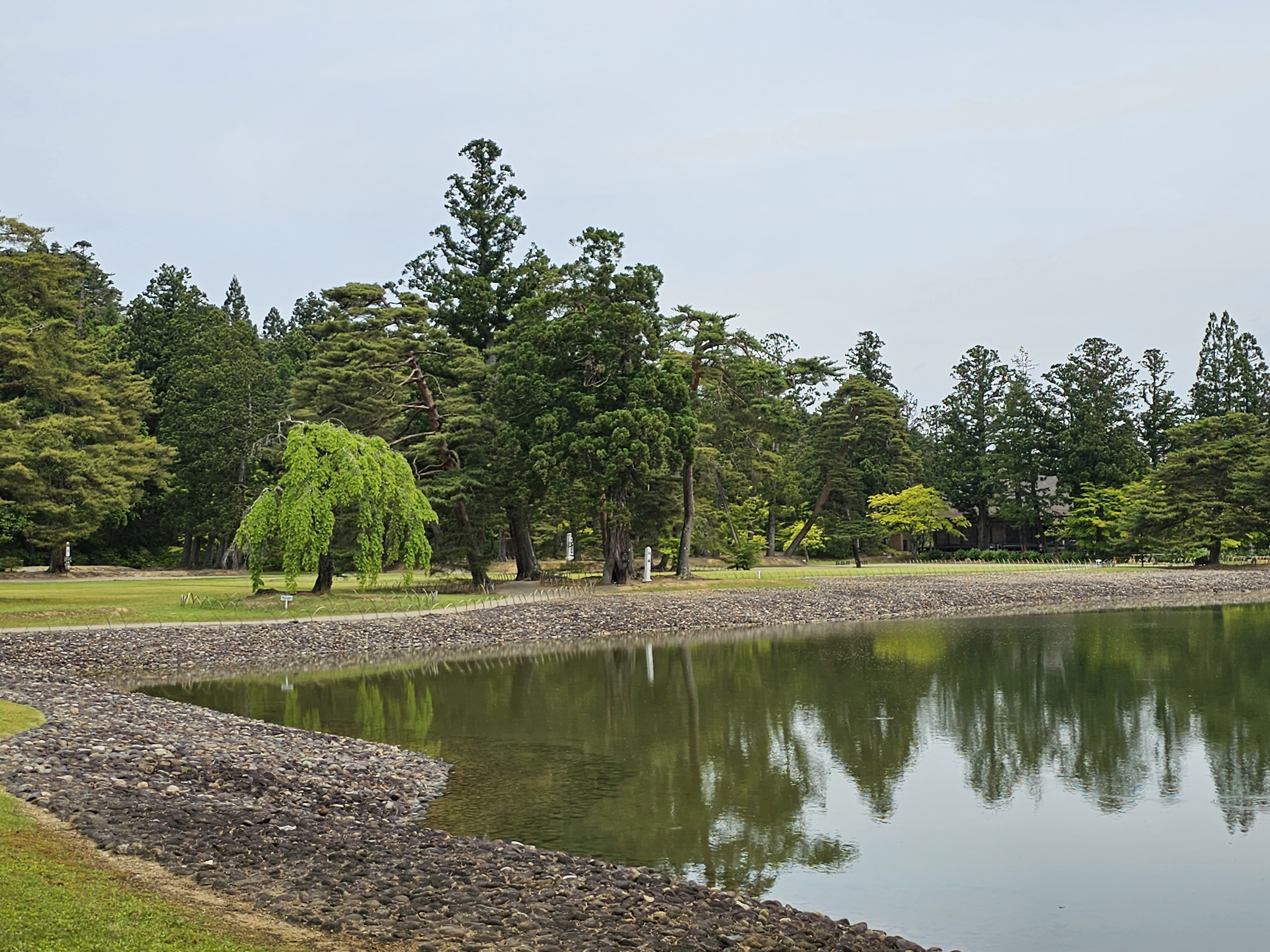
Motsuji Temple, Pure Land Garden

== Annual events ==
- January 20: The Jogyodo 20th Night Festival and "Ennen no Mai" Dance
- May 1–5: Spring Fujiwara Festival and Ennen no Mai Dance
- June 20 - July 10: Ayame Matsuri or Iris Festival
- August 16: Daimonji Matsuri or Bon Fire Festival
- September 15–30: Hagi Matsuri or Japanese Bush Clover Festival
- November 1–3: Autumn Fujiwara Festival and Ennen no Mai Dance

== See also ==
- List of Historic Sites of Japan (Iwate)
- World Heritage Sites in Japan
- Shiramizu Amidadō
