= Hiraizumi =

Town in Iwate Prefecture, Japan

Hiraizumi 平泉町
- Town
- Chūson-ji, a World Heritage site in Hiraizumi

- Flag Emblem

- Location of Hiraizumi in Iwate Prefecture

- Coordinates: 38°59′11.8″N 141°06′49.8″E
- Country: Japan
- Region: Tōhoku
- Prefecture: Iwate
- District: Nishiiwai
- First official recorded: 792 AD
- Town settled: October 1, 1953

Government
  - Mayor: Yukio Aoki (from August 2014)

Area
  - Total: 63.39 km^{2} (24.48 sq mi)

Population (April 30, 2020)
  - Total: 7,408
  - Density: 116.9/km^{2} (302.7/sq mi)
- Time zone: UTC+9 (Japan Standard Time)
- Tree: Cryptomeria
- Flower: Sakura
- Bird: Japanese bush warbler
- Phone number: 0191-46-2111
- Address: 45-2 Hiraizumi Shirayama, Hiraizumi-chō, Nishi-Iwai-gun, Iwate-ken 029-4192
- Website: Official website

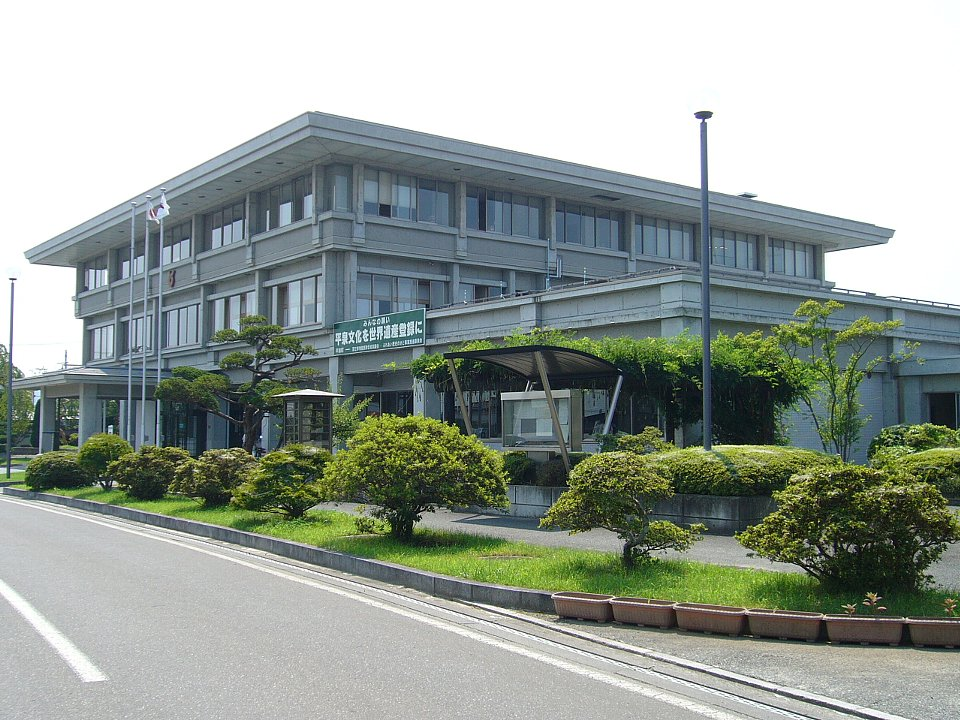
Hiraizumi Town Hall

Hiraizumi (平泉町, Hiraizumi-chō) is a town located in Nishiiwai District, Iwate Prefecture, Japan. As of 30 April 2020, the town had an estimated population of 7,408 and a population density of 120 inhabitants per square kilometre (310/sq mi) in 2,616 households. The total area of the town was 63.39 km^{2} (24.48 sq mi). It is noted for the Historic Monuments and Sites of Hiraizumi, which achieved UNESCO World Heritage Site status in 2011.

== Geography ==
Hiraizumi is the smallest municipality in Iwate Prefecture in terms of area. Located in a basin in south-central Iwate Prefecture in the Tōhoku region of northern Honshu, the town is surrounded by the Kitakami Mountains.

=== Neighboring municipalities ===
Iwate Prefecture

- Ichinoseki
- Ōshū

=== Climate ===
Hiraizumi has a humid climate (Köppen climate classification Cfa) characterized by mild summers and cold winters. The average annual temperature in Hiraizumi is 10.8 °C. The average annual rainfall is 1265 mm with September as the wettest month and February as the driest month. The temperatures are highest on average in August, at around 24.4 °C, and lowest in January, at around -1.9 °C.

== Demographics ==
Per Japanese census data, the population of Hiraizumi peaked around 1950, and has declined over the past 70 years.

Historical population
Year	Pop.	±%
1920	7,924	—
1930	8,564	+8.1%
1940	9,047	+5.6%
1950	11,320	+25.1%
1960	10,590	−6.4%
1970	9,474	−10.5%
1980	9,253	−2.3%
1990	9,493	+2.6%
2000	9,054	−4.6%
2010	8,345	−7.8%
2020	7,252	−13.1%

== History ==
The area of present-day Hiraizumi was part of ancient Mutsu Province. It was the home of the Northern Fujiwara clan for about 100 years in the late Heian era, during which time it served as the de facto capital of Ōshū, an area containing nearly a third of the Japanese land area. At its height the population of Hiraizumi reached 50,000 or more than 100,000, rivaling Kyoto in size and splendor.

The first structure built in Hiraizumi may have been Hakusan Shrine on top of Mount Kanzan (Barrier Mountain). A writer in 1334 recorded that the shrine was already 700 years old. Although rebuilt many times, the same shrine is still standing in the same location.

In about 1100, Fujiwara no Kiyohira moved his home from Fort Toyoda in present-day Esashi, in the city of Ōshū to Mount Kanzan in Hiraizumi. This location was significant for several reasons. Kanzan is situated at the junction of two rivers, the Kitakami and the Koromo. Traditionally the Koromo River served as the boundary between Japan to the south and the Emishi peoples to the north. By building his home south of the Koromo, Kiyohira (half Emishi himself) demonstrated his intention to rule Ōshū without official sanction from the court in Kyoto. Kanzan was also directly on the Ōshū Kaidō, the main road leading from Kyoto to the northern lands as they opened up. Kanzan was also seen as the exact center of Ōshū which stretched from the Shirakawa Barrier in the south to Sotogahama in present-day Aomori Prefecture.

Kiyohira built the large temple complex known as Chūson-ji. The first structure was a large pagoda at the very top of the mountain. In conjunction with this, he placed small umbrella reliquaries (kasa sotoba) every hundred meters along the Ōshū kaidō decorated with placards depicting Amida Buddha painted in gold. Other pagodas, temples and gardens followed including the Konjiki-dō, a jewel box of a building intended to represent the Buddhist Pure Land and the final resting place of the Fujiwara lords.

Hiraizumi's golden age lasted for nearly 100 years. It was destroyed in 1189, and, after the fall of the Fujiwara clan, the town sank back into relative obscurity, and most of the buildings that gave the town its cultural prominence were destroyed. When the poet Matsuo Bashō saw the state of the town in 1689 he penned a famous haiku about the impermanence of human glory:

夏草や / 兵どもが / 夢の跡
Natsukusa ya! / Tsuwamono-domo ga / yume no ato

Ah, summer grasses! / All that remains / Of the warriors' dreams. (1689)

Modern Hiraizumi village was created on April 1, 1889, with the establishment of the post-Meiji restoration municipality system. Hiraizumi was raised to town status on October 1, 1953. It annexed neighboring Nagashima village on April 15, 1955. The town lost some land to the city of Ichinoseki on September 1, 1956, and again on May 1, 1964.

== Government ==
Hiraizumi has a mayor-council form of government with a directly elected mayor and a unicameral town council of 12 members. Hiraizumi and the city of Ichinoseki collectively contribute five seats to the Iwate Prefectural legislature. In terms of national politics, the city is part of Iwate 3rd district of the lower house of the Diet of Japan.

== Economy ==
The local economy is based on agriculture and tourism.

== Education ==
Hiraizumi has two public elementary schools and one public middle school operated by the town government. The town does not have a high school.

== Transportation ==
East Japan Railway Company (JR East) - Tōhoku Main Line

- Hiraizumi

=== Highway ===
- Tōhoku Expressway – Chusonji PA – Hiraizumi-Maezawa IC
- National Route 4

== International relations ==
Tiantai County, Zhejiang Province, China, friendship city since 2010

== Local attractions ==
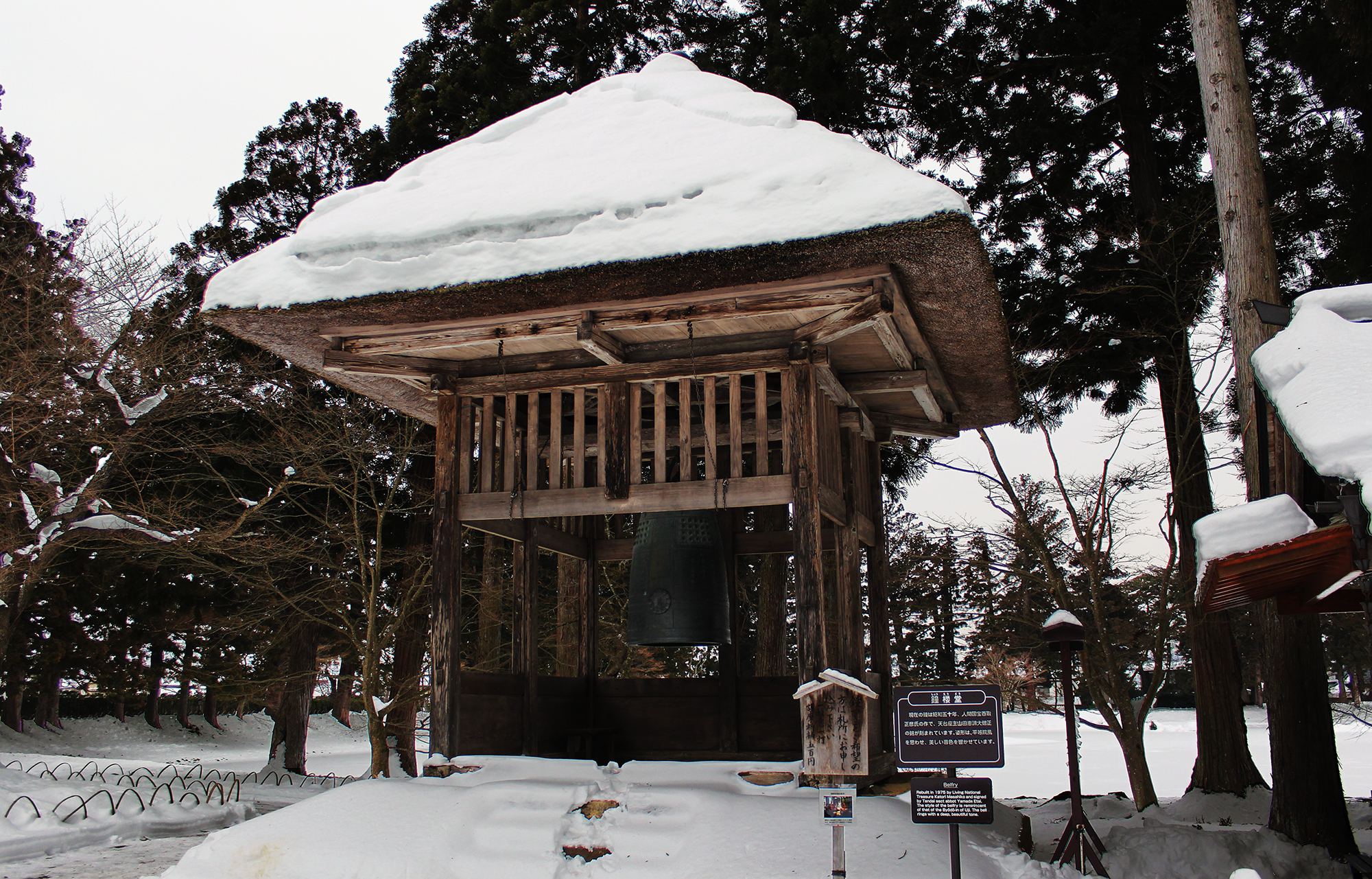
The belfry of Mōtsū-ji

Hiraizumi has a number of officially listed National Treasures and other culturally or historically notable sites.

=== Buddhist temples ===
- Chūson-ji, including the Konjikidō Golden Hall
- The ruins of Kanjizaiō-in with its 'Pure Land' style Jōdo Garden
- Mōtsū-ji with a 'Pure Land' style Jōdo Garden
- The ruins of Muryōkō-in
- Takkoku-no-Iwaya Bishamon chapel

=== Other places ===
- Takadachi Gikeidō (高館義経堂)
- Yanagi-no-Gosho Palace Site
