= Composite bow =

Bow made from horn, wood, and sinew laminated together

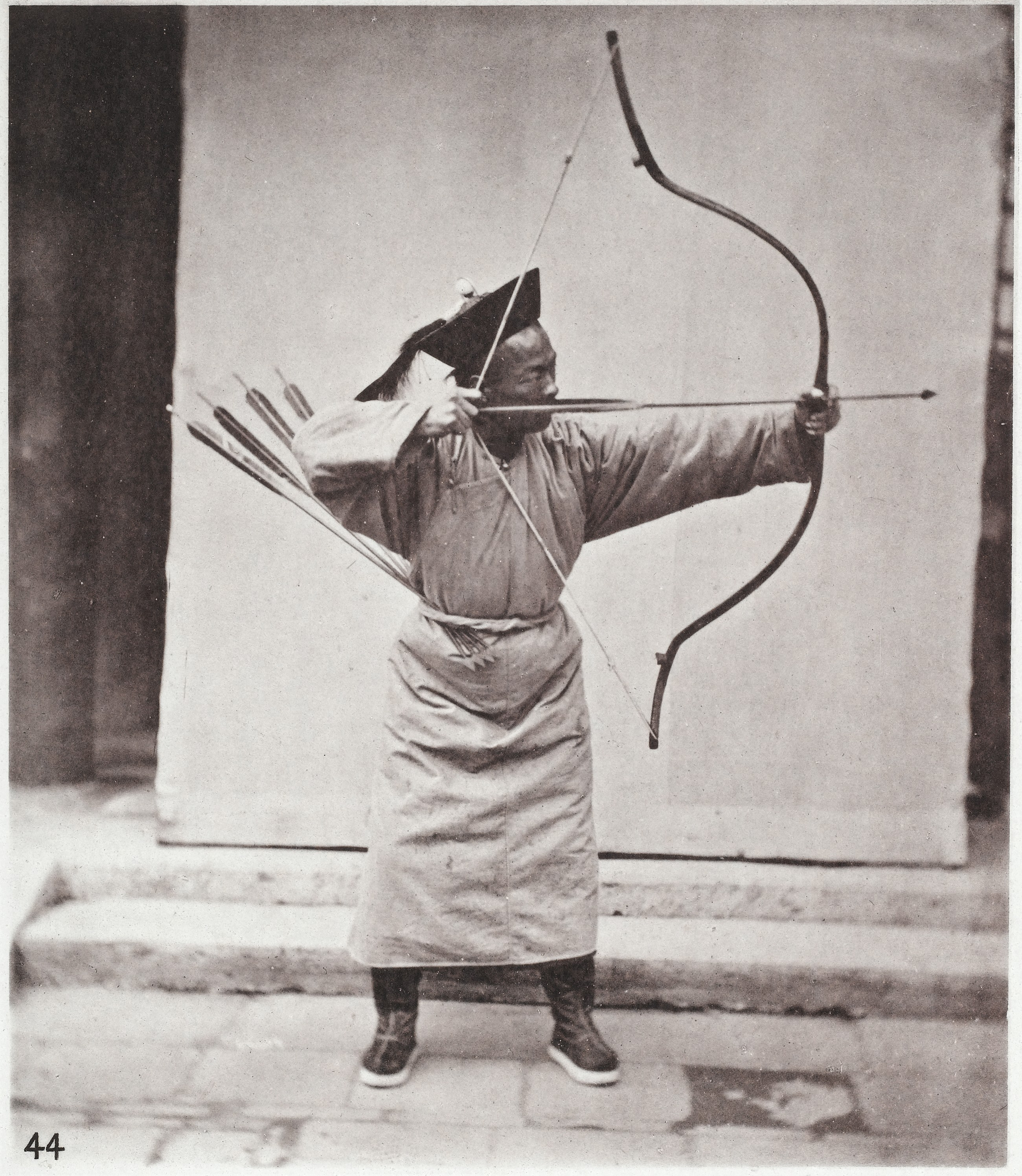
A massive composite bow drawn by a Qing era archer, northern China, ca. 19th century

A composite bow is a bow made from many different materials. Composite bows can be made from any combination of horn, antler, bamboo, wood, or sinew. These materials are typically laminated together with glue.

Materials such as horn or antler are added to composite bows because they have extraordinary compression strength, which complements the similarly exceptional tensile strength of sinew. This combination greatly increases the energy-storing potential of a composite bow, relative to its length.

Composite bows are able to be drawn to the same length as bows that are much larger, making them more efficient. However, it is very difficult and time consuming to make a composite bow, and the finished bow is more sensitive to moisture. Materials such as horn and antler are also very heavy, which can affect speed.

It is unclear when and where horn composite bows first originated, but the strongest evidence suggests that they were first developed by sedentary Bronze Age civilizations in Anatolia or Mesopotamia, and then spread to ancient Egypt. The highly mobile Indo-Iranian Andronovo culture was instrumental in spreading the early composite bow to East Asia. The Scythian-style bow was the first composite bow suited for mounted archery, and rapidly became the dominant type of composite bow used by militaries across Europe and Asia for hundreds of years. The Scythian bow was later abandoned in favor of simpler styles with flatter profiles, and all further composite bows in history were based on this prototype.

Composite bows began to be supplanted by guns in the early modern period. In some areas, composite bows survived, and were further developed for leisure purposes. Early modern Turkish bows were specialized for long-distance archery. Composite bows are still made and used in Korea and in China, and the tradition has been revived elsewhere. Modern replicas are available, often incorporating natural and synthetic materials.

== Origins and use ==
It is not known exactly when and where the composite bow originated. It is also uncertain if the composite bow has a single origin, as it may have developed independently in different parts of the world. The composite bow likely originated in the Bronze Age, but it is unclear if it originated in the Early Bronze Age or the Late Bronze Age.

The earliest composite bow shapes are found among the Indo-European early Bronze Age pastoralists in Europe, as well as in western Asia and Arabia, however these bows are likely wood-sinew bows that lack horn components. Reliable evidence suggests that the first composite bows containing horn originated in the Near East, probably Syria, Anatolia, or Mesopotamia, and then spread to Egypt. This culminated in the invention of the angular bow. Several composite bows were found in the tomb of Tutankhamun, who died in 1324 BCE.

The composite bow was spread to East Asia by the Indo-Iranian Andronovo culture as well as the Srubnaya culture.

The Scythian bow, ideally suited to mounted archery, likely evolved from the angular bow, showing similar design and construction methods as the Egyptian bows. As the first form of composite bow ideally suited to mounted archery, it became the dominant shape of composite bow in Europe and Asia until the 1st century AD.

There are strong indications that Greek Bronze Age cultures were using composite bows on a large scale. By the 4th century BCE, chariotry had ceased to have military importance, replaced by cavalry everywhere (except in Britannia, where charioteers are not recorded as using bows).

The mounted archer became the archetypal warrior of the steppes and the composite bow was his primary weapon, used to protect the herds, in steppe warfare, and for incursions into settled lands.

Classic tactics for horse-mounted archers included skirmishing: they would approach, shoot, and retreat before any effective response could be made. The term Parthian shot refers to the widespread horse-archer tactic of shooting backwards over the rear of their horses as they retreated. The extremely short length of the composite bow made this very convenient.

Composite bows could be used without difficulty by infantry. The infantry archers of classical Greece and the Roman Empire used composite bows. The military of the Han dynasty (220 BCE–206 CE) utilized composite crossbows, often in infantry square formations, in their many engagements against the Xiongnu. Until 1571, archers with composite bows were a main component of the forces of the Ottoman Empire, but in the Battle of Lepanto in that year, they lost most of these troops and never replaced them.

== Construction and materials ==
The wooden core gives the bow its shape and dimensional stability. It is often made of multiple pieces, joined with animal glue in V-splices, so the wood must accept glue well. Pieced construction allows the sharp bends that many designs require, and the use of woods with different mechanical properties for the bending and non-bending sections.

The wood of the bending part of the limb ("dustar") must endure intense shearing stress, and denser woods such as hard maples are normally used in Turkish bows. Bamboo, and wood of the mulberry family, are traditional in China. Some composite bows have nonbending tips ("siyahs"), which need to be stiff and light; they may be made of woods such as Sitka spruce.

A thin layer of horn is glued onto what will be the belly of the bow, the side facing the archer. Water buffalo horn is very suitable, as is horn of several antelopes such as gemsbok, oryx, ibex, and that of Hungarian grey cattle. Goat and sheep horn can also be used. Most forms of cow horn are not suitable, as they soon delaminate with use. The horn can store more energy than wood in compression.

The sinew, soaked in animal glue, is then laid in layers on the back of the bow; the strands of sinew are oriented along the length of the bow. The sinew is normally obtained from the lower legs and back of wild deer or domestic ungulates. Traditionally, ox tendons are considered inferior to wild-game sinews since they have a higher fat content, leading to spoilage. Sinew has greater elastic tension properties than wood, again increasing the amount of energy that can be stored in the bow stave.

Hide glue or gelatin made from fish gas bladders is used to attach layers of sinew to the back of the bow, and to attach the horn belly to the wooden core.

Stiffening laths, if used, are attached. Both horn and laths may be bound and glued with further lengths of sinew. After months of drying, the bow is ready for use. Further finishing may include thin leather or waterproof bark, to protect the bow from moisture, and recent Turkish bows were often highly decorated with colourful paints and gold leaf.

Strings and arrows are essential parts of the weapon system, but no type of either is specifically associated with composite bows throughout their history.

== Advantages and disadvantages of composite construction ==
=== Advantages ===
The main advantage of composite bows over self bows (made from a single piece of wood) is their combination of smaller size with high power. They are therefore more convenient than self bows when the archer is mobile, as from horseback, or from a chariot. Almost all composite bows are also recurve bows as the shape curves away from the archer; this design gives higher draw-weight in the early stages of the archer's draw, storing somewhat more total energy for a given final draw-weight. It would be possible to make a wooden bow that has the same shape, length, and draw-weight as a traditional composite bow, but it could not store the energy, and would break before full draw.

For most practical non-mounted archery purposes, composite construction offers no advantage; "the initial velocity is about the same for all types of bow... within certain limits, the design parameters... appear to be less important than is often claimed." However, they are superior for horsemen and in the specialized art of flight archery: "A combination of many technical factors made the composite flight bow better for flight shooting." The higher arrow velocity is only for well-designed composite bows of high draw-weight. At the weights more usual for modern amateurs, the greater density of horn and sinew compared with wood usually cancels any advantage.

=== Disadvantages ===
Constructing composite bows requires much more time and a greater variety of materials than self bows, and the animal glue used can lose strength in humid conditions; the 6th-century Byzantine military manual, the Strategikon, advised the cavalry of the Byzantine army, many of whom were armed with composite bows, to keep their bows in leather cases to keep them dry. Karpowicz suggests that crafting a composite bow may take a week's work, excluding drying time (months) and gathering materials, while a self bow can be made in a day and dried in a week. Peoples living in humid or rainy regions historically have favoured self bows, while those living in temperate, dry, or arid regions have favoured composite bows.

Medieval Europeans favoured self bows as hand bows, but they made composite prods for crossbows. The prods were usually well protected from rain and humidity, which are prevalent in parts of Europe. Ancient Mediterranean civilizations, influenced by Eastern Archery, preferred composite recurve bows, and the Romans manufactured and used them as far north as Britannia.

The civilizations of India used both self bows and composite bows. The Mughals were especially known for their composite bows due to their Turko-Mongol roots. Waterproofing and proper storage of composite bows were essential due to India's extremely wet and humid subtropical climate and plentiful rainfall today (which averages 970–1,470 mm or 38–58 inches in most of the country, and exceeds well over 2,500 mm or 100 inches per year in the wettest areas due to monsoons).

The civilizations of China also used a combination of self bows, composite recurve bows, and laminated reflex bows. Self bows and laminated bows were preferred in southern China in earlier periods of history due to the region's extremely wet, humid, and rainy subtropical climate. The average rainfall in southern China exceeds 970 mm (38 inches), averaging 1,500–2,500 mm (58–97 inches) in many areas today.

== Technical changes in classical times ==
The details of bow construction changed somewhat with time. It is not clear that the various developments of the composite bow led to measurable improvements: "the development of archery equipment may not be a process involving progressive improvements in performance. Rather, each design type represents one solution to the problem of creating a mobile weapon system capable of hurling lightweight projectiles."

=== West Asian 'duck head' bows ===
In West Asia, composite bows of medium-length, with recurved, 'duck head' tips were common among the Elamite and Assyrian people during the Iron Age. Recurved tips were a new invention in archery, and the 'duck head' bows may have influenced later designs, including the highly recurved, classical "Scythian"-style bow. In the Achaemenid Empire, this type of bow was further developed, adding even more recurved tips, and further decreasing the bow's length, which was possibly an adaptation to mounted archery. Many depictions of such bows exist at the palace of King Darius in Susa, as well as the city of Persepolis.

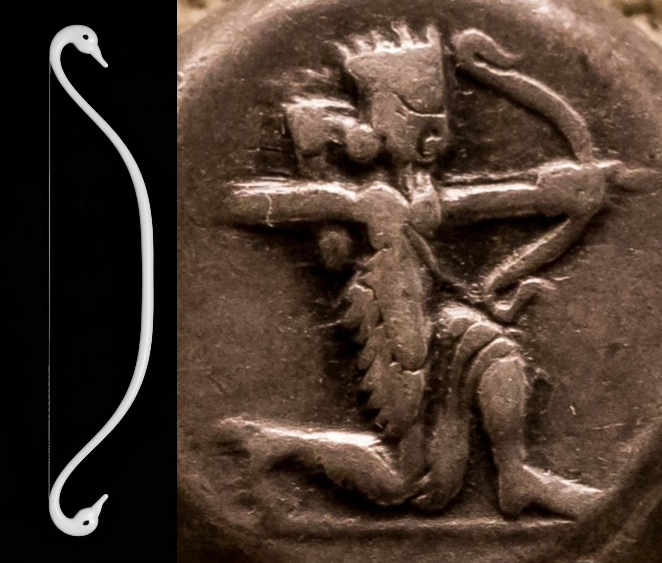
On the left, an artistic impression of a 'duck head' bow. The image on the right is a Greek coin depicting a Persian king, probably Darius the Great, holding a similar bow.

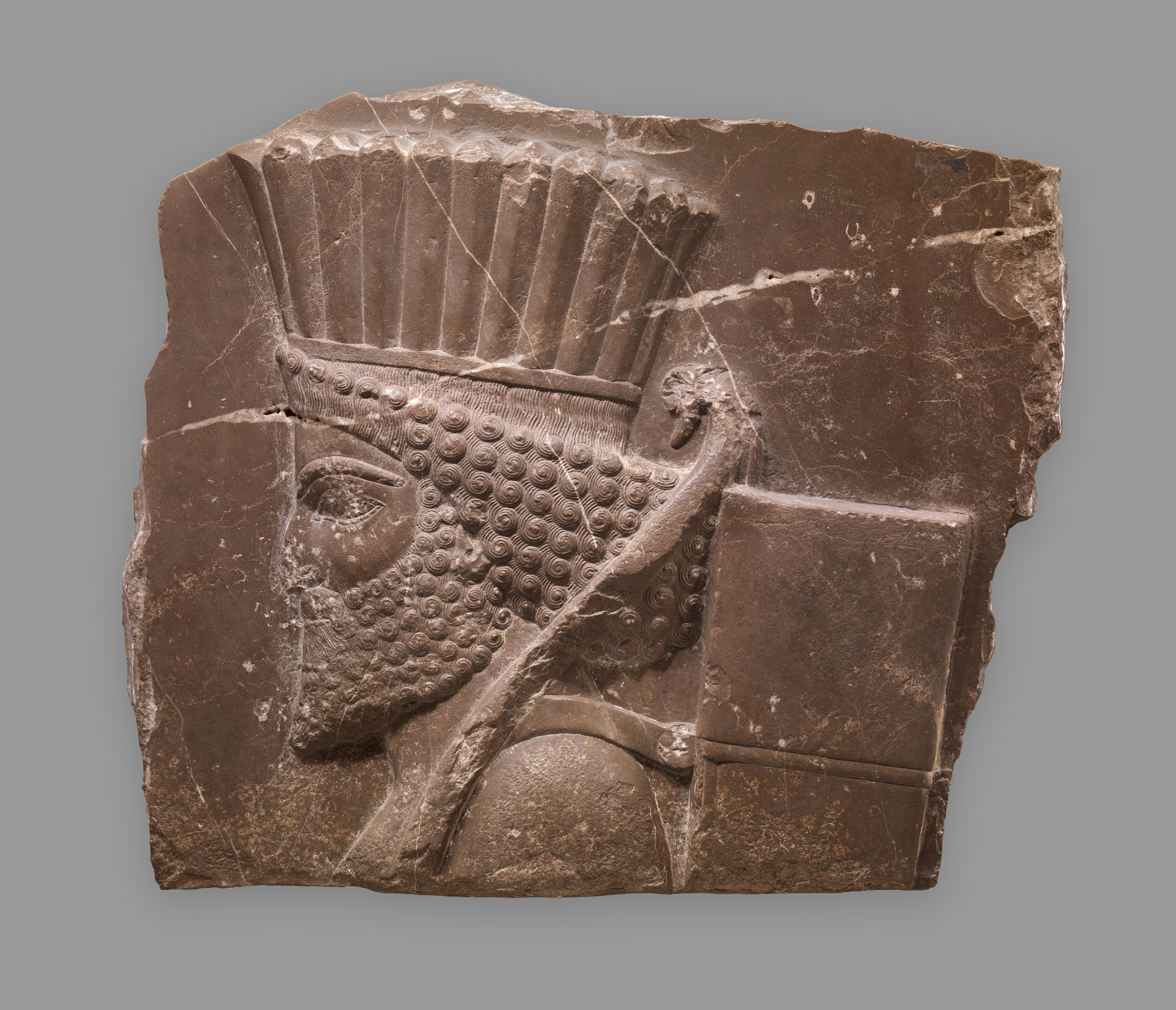
A Persian guard at Persepolis, with a bow that terminates in a duck head shape.

=== Scythian bows ===
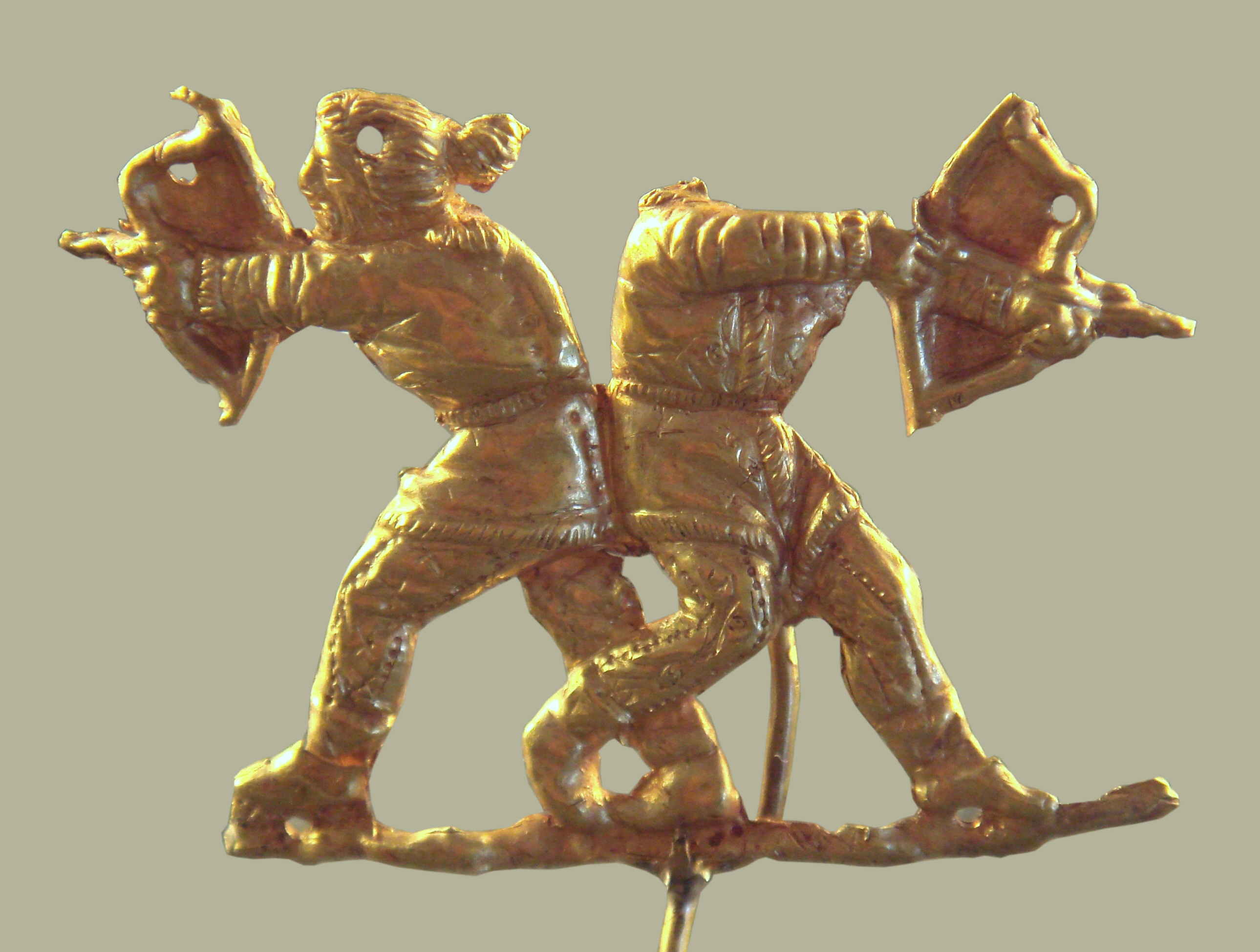
Scythians shooting with bows, Panticapaeum (known today as Kerch, Crimea), 4th century BCE

Although Scythians used many different kinds of bows, they have come to be associated with an iconic style of composite bow, which has exaggerated serpentine curvature. This bow has come to be known as the classical Scythian design. Yet the earliest Scythian bows actually lack the characteristic recurved tips of the "classical" Scythian design. An early Scythian bow from Tuva is described as a "simple" bow, completely lacking the curvy mid-section that is typical of the classical Scythian design.

Variants of the Scythian bow were the dominant form in Asia until approximately the first century BCE.

The size of Scythian bows varied greatly by region. Western Scythian bows in Europe were very short, while those in the eastern Scythian world were longer. A study of Western Scythian bows from the Black Sea region yielded an average length of less than 30 inches.

Western Scythian bows did not include horn; they were made of wood and sinew alone. Many specimens of Scythian-style horn bows have been found in the Eastern Eurasia, such as at Yanghai cemetery in China. These bows are nevertheless attributed to non-Scythian cultures.

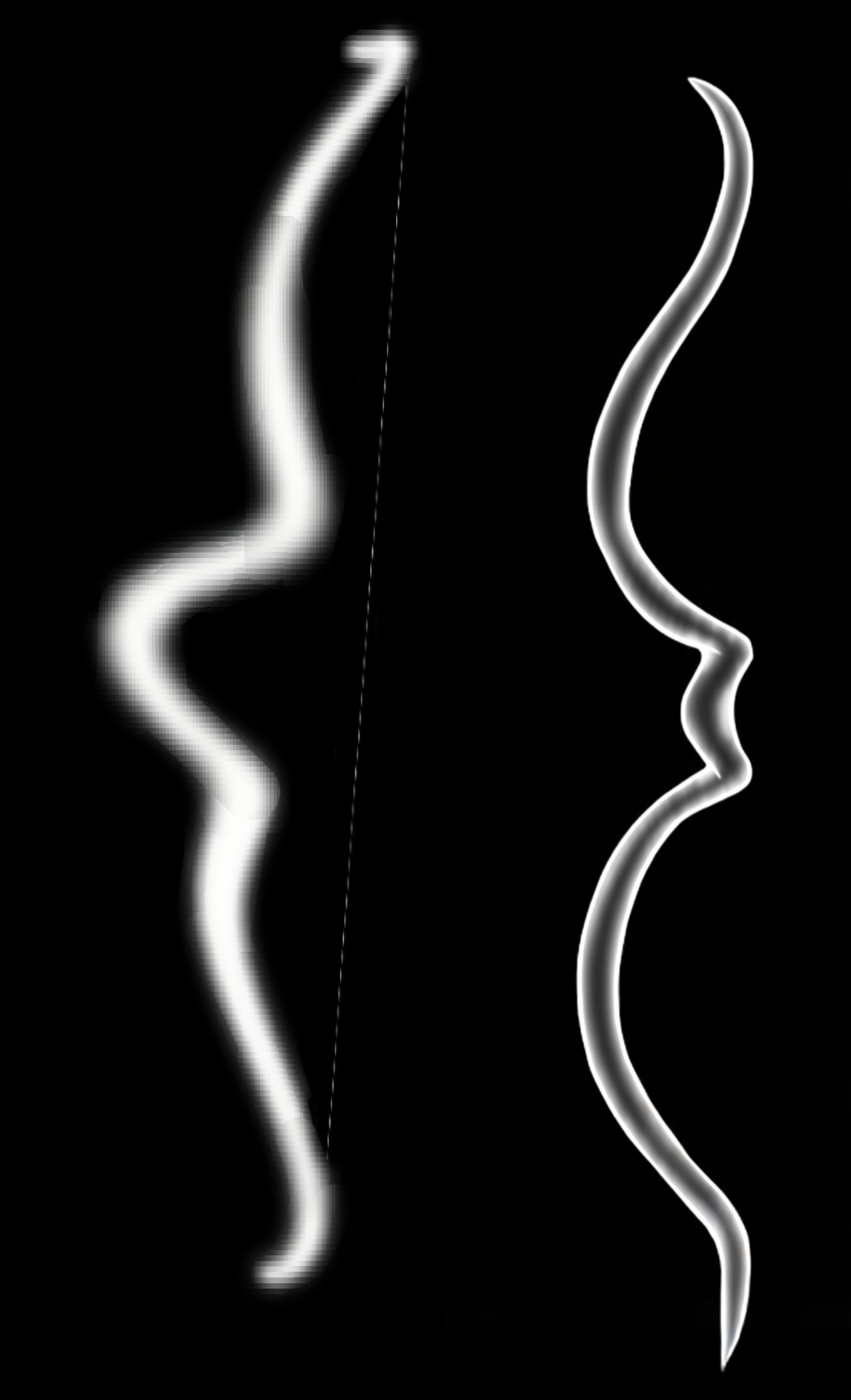
Scythian-style bows made in the Caucasus region, often associated with the Koban culture, were made "backwards", with deflexed handles, leading to an "interception" at the stress risers. The bow on the left is strung properly.

It was originally hypothesized that the extremely recurved tips of the classic Scythian design were intended to be flexible, "working" tips, in order to add speed and increase the smoothness of the draw. However, archery expert Adam Karpowicz made a reconstruction of a Scythian-style bow, and found that the tips did not flex much at all. He suggests it is doubtful that this was the intended function of the Scythian design, and points out that many Scythian bows actually lack the recurved tips that have become so closely associated with the classical "Scythian" bow in the public imagination.

=== Siyahs, stiff tips, stiff grips ===
Around 200 B.C. at Yanghai cemetery, a new kind of bow appears with flat, propeller-like limbs, straight tips with bone or antler stiffening plates, and a stiff grip. This type of bow quickly supplanted the older, classical "Scythian" style, and became the foundational model from which all future composite bows would develop, with an enduring legacy for hundreds of years.

Bone stiffeners are found in association with nomads of the time. They are not found in Achaemenid Persia, in early Imperial Rome, or in Han China.

Siyahs have also been described on the Arabian peninsula, and may have been introduced to Persia by the Sassanids.

Stiffeners likely appeared in Roman militaries around or before 9 CE. Composite bows were made even in the cold and damp of Britannia. They were the normal weapon of later Roman archers, both infantry and cavalry units (although Vegetius recommends training recruits "arcubus ligneis", with wooden bows).

Bone (or antler) reinforcements for stiffening handles developed in Central Asia during the 3rd to 2nd century BCE, with earliest finds from the area of Lake Baikal. Fittings from this type of bow appear right across Asia from Korea to the Crimea.

Such bows were often asymmetric, with lower limbs shorter than the upper.

One of the oldest such bows ever discovered is known as the "Yrzi" bow from Dura Europos; it belonged to the Parthian culture. The Qum Darya bow is another such example, and had even more bone plates than the Yrzi bow. Other examples from Niya and Lake Khoton date to roughly the same time period, with excessively wide limbs and a core spliced at the handle region. These bows have attracted considerable attention as their owners were blond haired, "Europoid" males wearing Chinese clothing, possibly making them foreign allies of the Chinese state.

The Qum-Darya bows have also been linked to the so-called Hunnic bows. The type of bow was superseded in the modern area of Hungary by an 'Avar' type, which could have up to 12 laths, with asymmetrical limbs and a stiff, set-back handle. Examples measured in situ suggest bow lengths of 120–140 cm (47–55 inches). When unstrung, the siyahs reversed sharply forward at an angle of 50-60 degrees.

== Post-classical development ==
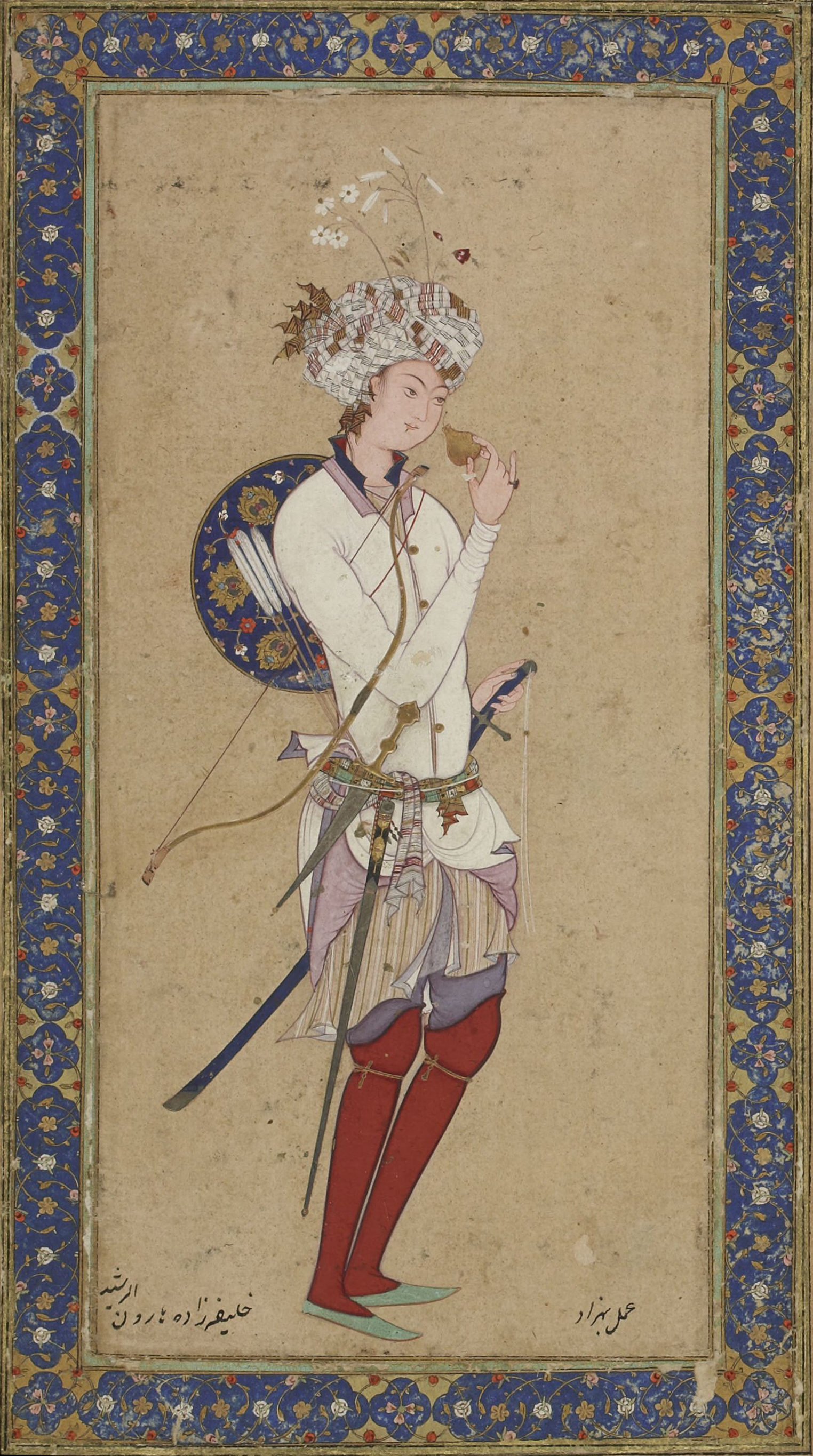
A Persian miniature representing a man with a composite bow

After the fall of the Western Roman Empire, armies of the Byzantine Empire maintained their tradition of horse archery for centuries. Byzantium finally fell to the Turks before the decline of military archery in favour of guns. Turkish armies included archers until about 1591 (they played a major role in the Battle of Lepanto (1571), and flight archery remained a popular sport in Istanbul until the early 19th century. Most surviving documentation of the use and construction of composite bows comes from China and the Middle East; until reforms early in the 20th century, skill with the composite bow was an essential part of the qualification for officers in the Chinese Imperial army.

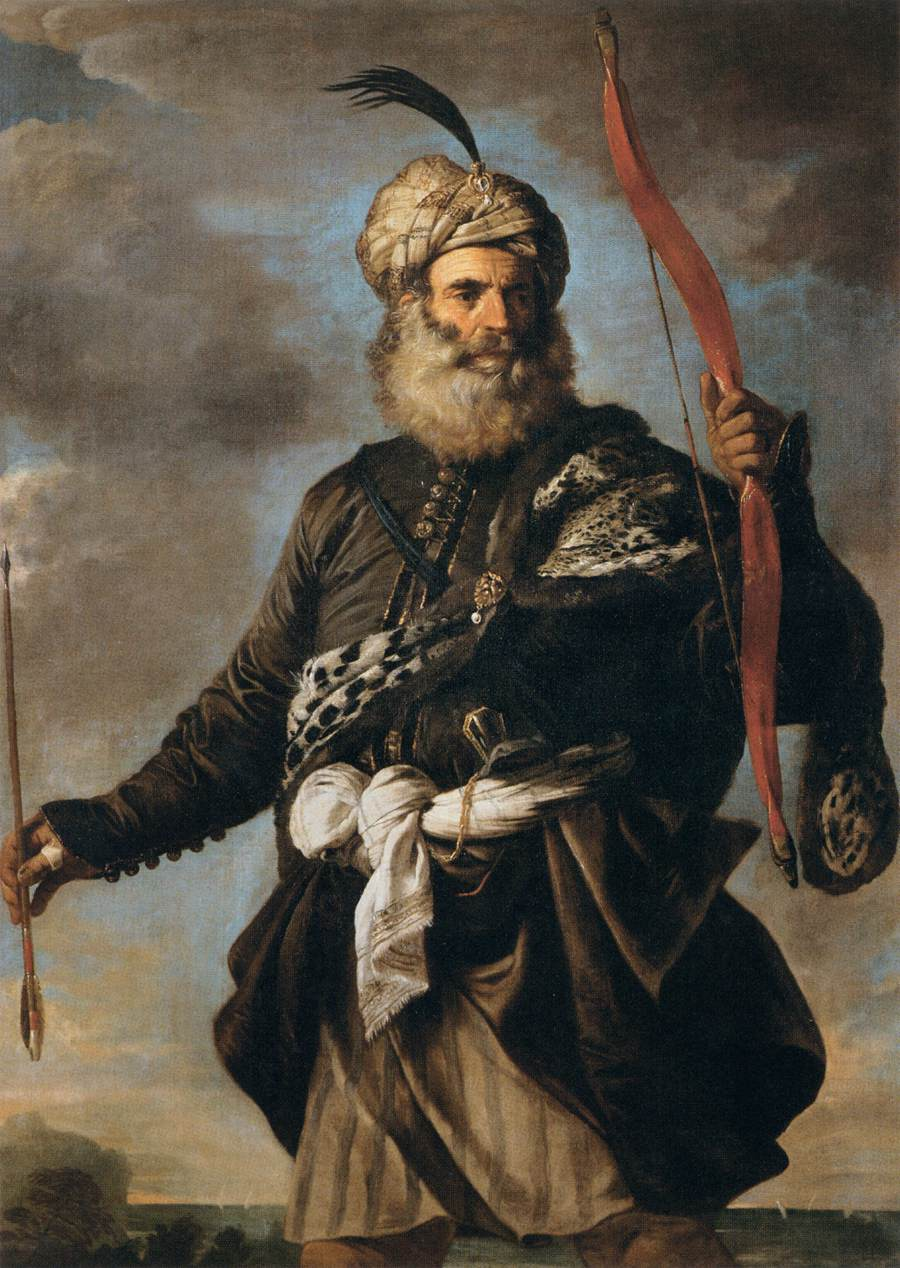
A Saracen pirate holding a bow of the then-popular short Kipchak (Mamluk) design

The composite bow was adopted throughout the Arab world, even though some Bedu tribesmen in the Hijaz retained the use of simple self bows. Persian designs were used after the conquest of the Sassanid Empire, and Turkish-type bows were widely used after the Turkic expansions. Roughly speaking, Arabs favoured slightly shorter siyahs and broader limbs than the Indo-Persian designs. Sometimes, the protective cover on the back was painted with Arabic calligraphy or geometric patterns. No design was standardized over the vast area of the Arab conquests. It was said that the best Arab composite bows were manufactured in Damascus, Syria.

The first surviving treatise on composite bow construction and archery was written in Arabic under Mamluk rule about 1368. Fragments of bone laths from composite bows were found among grave goods in the United Arab Emirates dating from the period between 100 BCE and 150 CE.

=== Integral wooden siyahs ===
Later developments in the composite bow included siyahs made of separate pieces of wood, attached with a V-splice to the wooden core of the bow, rather than strengthened by external reinforcement. Medieval and modern bows generally have integral wooden siyahs and lack stiffening laths.

=== String bridges ===
A string "bridge" or "run" is an attachment of horn or wood, used to hold the string a little further apart from the bow's limbs at the base of the siyahs, as well as allowing the siyah to rest at an angle forward of the string. This attachment may add weight, but might give a small increase in the speed of the arrow by increasing the initial string angle and therefore the force of the draw in its early stages. Large string bridges are characteristic of Manchu (Qing dynasty, 1644–1911) bows and late Mongolian bows, while small string bridges are characteristic of Korean, Crimean Tatar, and some Ming dynasty (1368–1644) bows. String bridges are not present in artwork in the time of Genghis Khan or before.

== Modern living traditions ==
All Eurasian composite bows derive from the same nomad origins, but every culture that used them has made its own adaptations to the basic design. The Turkish, Mongolian, and Korean bows were standardized when archery lost its military function and became a popular sport. Recent Turkish bows are optimized for flight shooting.

=== Perso-Parthian bows ===
The Perso-Parthian bow is a symmetric recurve under high tension when strung. The "arms" of the bow are supposed to reflex far enough to cross each other when the bow is unstrung. The finished bow is covered by bark, fine leather, or in some cases shark skin to keep out moisture.

Perso-Parthian bows were in use as late as the 1820s in Persia (ancient Iran). They were then replaced by muskets.

=== Turkish bows ===
Turkish bows evolved after the decline of military archery, into highly effective flight bows. Their decoration often included delicate and beautiful multicoloured designs with gold.

=== Chinese bows ===
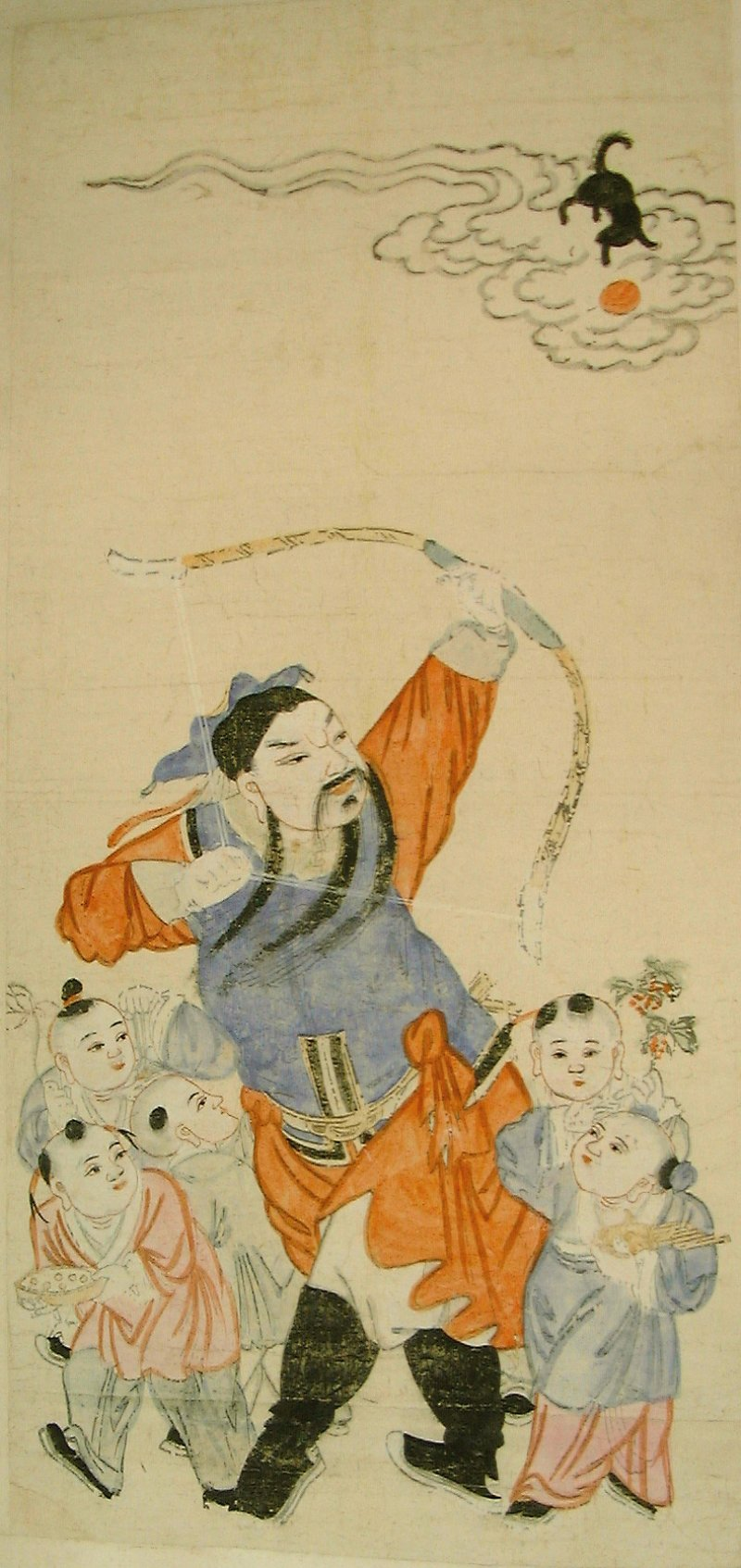
Zhang Xian shooting a pebble bow at the tiangou causing an eclipse

Some of the oldest possible composite bows found in China are from tombs in Shandong and Hunan provinces, dated to 670-570 BCE. Although results were inconclusive, these bows may have contained horn belly plates and sinew. One bow had a variable cross section, with some regions being ovoid, and others 'D-shaped'. The non-working siyahs had a circular cross section. The bow was reflexed and symmetrical, and its entire body was covered in black lacquer. Bows of this type averaged around 1.15m or 44 inches in length. According to Shelby, bows of this type were used during the warring states period and in the rituals of Confucius. They were 'home-grown' bows indigenous to the Chinese ethnic group. This variant of bow is found at Yanghai cemetery, among many 'Scythian-style' bows.

Some of the Scythian-style bows found at Yanghai cemetery are lacquered like the ancient Chinese bows. Adam Karpowicz has suggested that some of the 'Scythian-style' bows at Yanghai may have been manufactured by Chinese craftsmen, or at least lacquered by Chinese artisans, who sold them to Indo-European-speaking customers.

For millennia, archery has played a pivotal role in Chinese history. Because the cultures associated with Chinese society spanned a wide geography and time range, the techniques and equipment associated with Chinese archery are diverse. Historical sources and archaeological evidence suggest that a variety of bow designs existed throughout Chinese history. For much of the 20th century, only a few Chinese traditional bow and arrow-making workshops were active. However, in the beginning of the 21st century, there has been a revival in interest among craftsmen looking to construct bows and arrows in the traditional Chinese style.

=== Mongolian bows ===
The Mongolian tradition of archery is attested by an inscription on a stone stele that was found near Nerchinsk in Siberia: "While Genghis Khan was holding an assembly of Mongolian dignitaries, after his conquest of Sartaul (Khwarezm), Yesüngge (the son of Genghis Khan's younger brother) shot a target at 335 alds (536 m)". The Mongol bowmaking tradition was lost under the Qing, who heavily restricted archery practice; only practice with blunt arrows at shorted distances was allowed while most other forms of practice, including mounted archery; was forbidden. The present bowmaking tradition emerged after independence in 1921 and is based on Manchu types of bow. Mounted archery had fallen into disuse and has been revived only in the 21st century.

Archery with composite bows is part of the annual festival of the three virile sports (wrestling, horseriding, archery), called "Naadam".

=== Hungarian bows ===
The Hungarian bow is a fairly long, approximately symmetrical composite reflex bow with antler stiffeners. Its shape is known from archaeological finds. Modern Hungarians have attempted to reconstruct the composite bows of their ancestors and have revived mounted archery as a competitive sport.

=== Korean bows ===
A traditional Korean bow, or gakgung, is a small horn-bamboo-sinew composite bow.

=== Japanese bows ===
Japanese yumi are made by laminating multiple pieces of bamboo and wood.

== Native American bows ==
Sinew-backed wood bows were common among Native Americans before European contact. Native Americans also made unique composite bows from horn, antler and possibly rib bones, which differed from Old World composite bows.

An antler-wood-sinew composite bow, likely of Nakota provenance, is found at the Brooklyn Museum in New York City. It consisted of a wooden core with several short 'keys' of antler imbedded on the belly side, and backed with sinew on the other.

The Inuit groups living in North America's northernmost climates often made composite bows using caribou antler, musk ox horn, whale baleen and sinew. Sinew was typically applied to these bows without glue. To accomplish this, sinew was braided in to long, fine cables, suspended along the back of the bow, twisted repeatedly to induce tension, and secured with a series of knots. This technique was also used by Apache tribes in the American Southwest.

It is unclear if horn bow technology developed independently in the Americas, however evidence for antler and bone composite bows does pre-date European contact.

== Replicas made with modern materials ==
Modern replicas of traditional composite bows are commercially available; they are usually made with fibreglass or carbon on both belly and back, easier to mass-produce and easier to take care of than traditional composite bows.

== See also ==
- Crossbow
- English longbow
- Longbow
- Flatbow
- Archery
- Mounted archery
- Bow shape

=== Bow construction techniques ===
- Self bow
- Compound bow
- Laminated bow
- Cable-backed bow
