= Tengu =

Type of legendary creature found in Japanese folk religion

Tengu (/ˈtɛŋɡuː/ TENG-goo; Japanese: 天狗, pronounced [teŋɡɯ], lit. 'Heavenly Dog') are a type of legendary creature found in Shinto belief. They are considered a type of yōkai (supernatural being) or kami (god or spirit). The Tengu were originally thought to take the forms of birds of prey and a monkey deity, and they were traditionally depicted with human, monkey, and avian characteristics. Sarutahiko Ōkami is considered to be the original model of Konoha-Tengu (a supernatural creature with a red face and long nose), which today is widely considered the Tengu's defining characteristic in the popular imagination. He is the Shinto monkey deity who is said to shed light on Heaven and Earth. Some experts theorize that Sarutahiko was a sun god worshiped in the Ise region prior to the popularization of Amaterasu.

Buddhism long held that the Tengu were disruptive demons and harbingers of war. Their image gradually softened, however, into one of protective, if still dangerous, spirits of the mountains and forests. Tengu are associated with the ascetic practice of Shugendō, and they are usually depicted in the garb of its followers, the yamabushi.

== Image ==
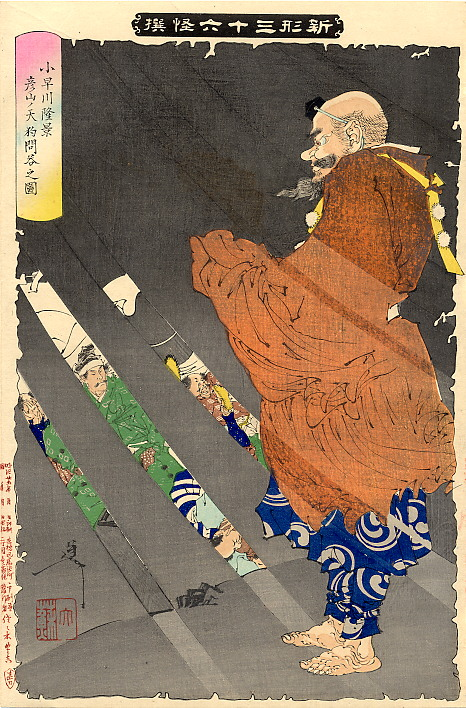
Kobayakawa Takakage debating with the tengu of Mount Hiko, by Yoshitoshi. The tengu's nose protrudes just enough to differentiate him from an ordinary yamabushi.

The tengu in art appears in a variety of shapes. It usually falls somewhere in between a large, monstrous bird and a wholly anthropomorphized being, often with a red face or an unusually large or long nose. Early depictions of tengu show them as kite-like beings who can take a human-like form, often retaining avian wings, heads, or beaks. The tengu's long nose seems to have been conceived in the 14th century, likely as a humanization of the original bird's bill. This feature allies them with the Sarutahiko Ōkami, who is described in the 720 CE text the Nihon Shoki with a similar nose measuring seven hand-spans in length. In village festivals, the two figures are often portrayed with identical red phallic-nosed mask designs.

Some of the earliest representations of tengu appear in Japanese picture scrolls, such as the Tenguzōshi Emaki (天狗草子絵巻), painted c. 1296, which parodies high-ranking priests by endowing them with the hawk-like beaks of tengu demons.

Tengu are often pictured as taking the shape of some sort of priest. Beginning in the 13th century, tengu came to be associated in particular with yamabushi, the mountain ascetics who practice Shugendō. The association soon found its way into Japanese art, where tengu are most frequently depicted in the yamabushi's unique costume, which includes a distinctive headwear called the tokin and a pompom sash (結袈裟, yuigesa). Due to their priestly aesthetic, they are often shown wielding the khakkhara, a distinct staff used by Buddhist monks, called a shakujō in Japanese.

Tengu are commonly depicted holding a magical feather fan (羽団扇, hauchiwa). According to legend, tengu taught Minamoto no Yoshitsune to fight with the "war-fan" and "the sword". In folk tales, these fans sometimes can grow or shrink a person's nose, but usually, they have attributed the power to stir up great winds. Various other strange accessories may be associated with tengu, such as a type of tall, one-toothed geta sandal often called tengu-geta.

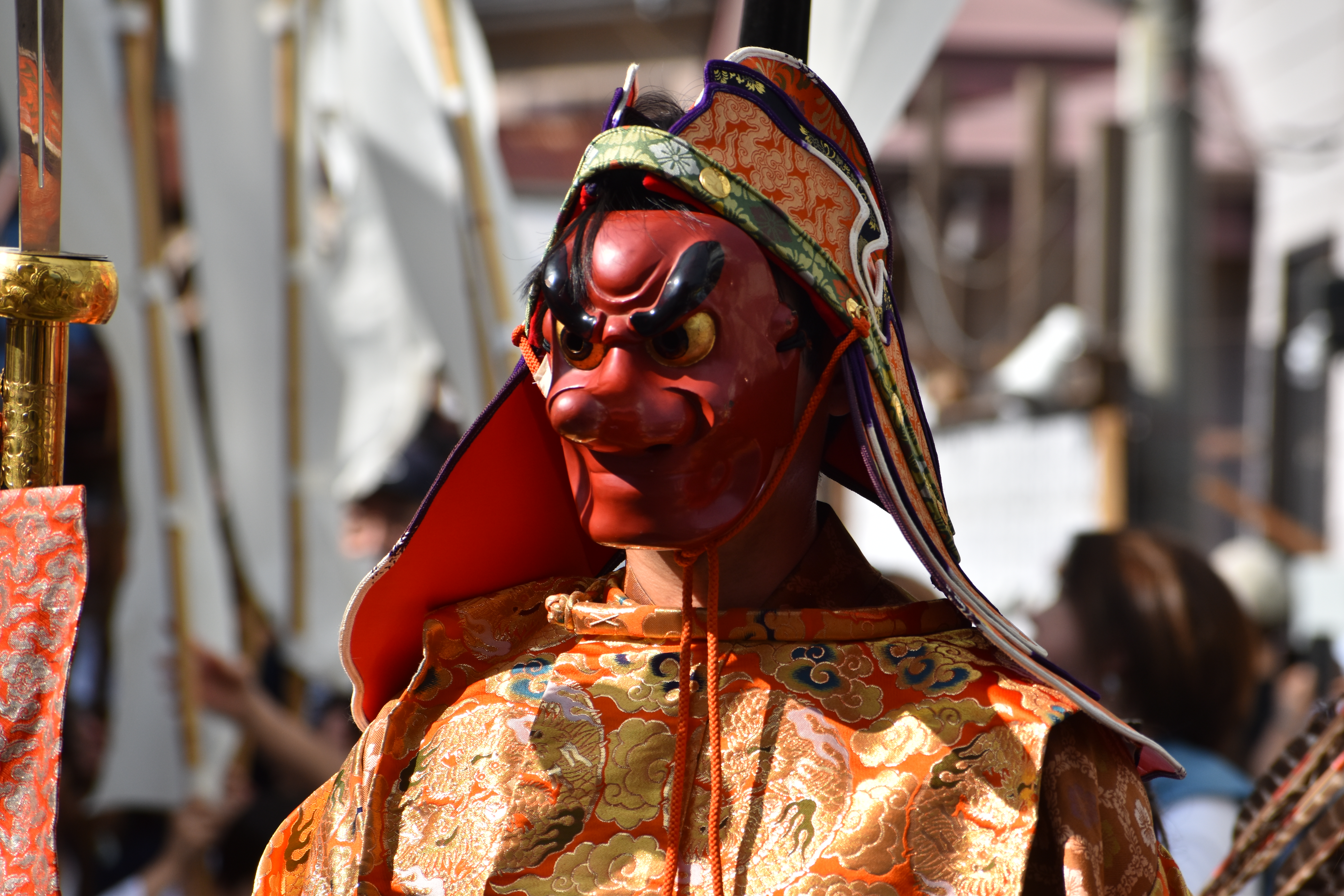
A man wearing a Tengu mask representing the deity Sarutahiko at the Menkake Gyōretsu festival in Kamakura.

== Origins ==
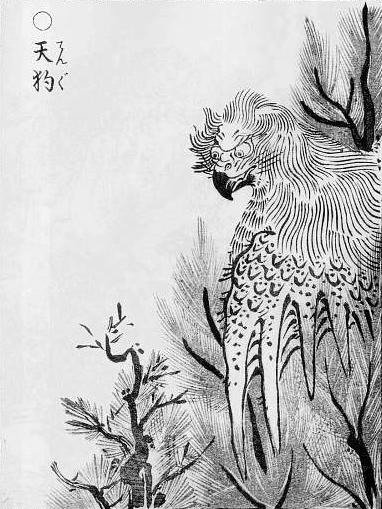
Tengu as a kite-like monster, from Toriyama Sekien's Gazu Hyakki Yakō. Text: 天狗/てんぐ (tengu)

It is believed, the term tengu and the characters used to write it are borrowed from the name of a fierce demon from Chinese folklore called tiāngǒu though this still has to be confirmed. Chinese literature assigns this creature a variety of descriptions, but most often it is a fierce and anthropophagous canine monster that resembles a shooting star or comet. It makes a noise like thunder and brings war wherever it falls. One account from the Shù Yì Jì (述異記, "A Collection of Bizarre Stories"), written in 1791, describes a dog-like tiāngǒu with a sharp beak and an upright posture, but usually tiāngǒu bear little resemblance to their Japanese counterparts.

The 23rd chapter of the Nihon Shoki, written in 720, is generally held to contain the first recorded mention of tengu in Japan. In this account a large shooting star appears and is identified by a Buddhist priest as a "heavenly dog", and much like the tiāngǒu of China, the star precedes a military uprising. "9th year, Spring, and month, 23rd day. A great star floated from East to West, and there was a noise like that of thunder. The people of that day said that it was the sound of the falling star. Others said that it was earth-thunder. Hereupon the Buddhist Priest Bin said:—"It is not the falling star, but the Celestial Dog, the sound of whose barking is like thunder.". When it appeared, there was famine".—(Nihon Shoki) Although the Chinese characters for tengu are used in the text, accompanying phonetic furigana characters give the reading as amatsukitsune (heavenly fox). M. W. de Visser speculated that the early Japanese meaning for the characters used to write Tengu may represent a conglomeration of two Chinese spirits: the tiāngǒu and the fox spirits called huli jing before the nuances of meaning were expanded to include local Japanese kami, therefore the true Tengu in appearance.

Some Japanese scholars have speculated that the tengu's image derives from that of the Hindu eagle deity Garuda, who was pluralized in Buddhist scripture as one of the major races of non-human beings. Like the tengu, the garuda are often portrayed in a human-like form with wings and a bird's beak. The name tengu seems to be written in place of that of the garuda in a Japanese sutra called the Emmyō Jizō-kyō (延命地蔵経), but this was likely written in the Edo period, long after the tengu's image was established. At least one early story in the Konjaku Monogatari describes a tengu carrying off a dragon, which is reminiscent of the garuda's feud with the nāga serpents. In other respects, however, the tengu's original behavior differs markedly from that of the garuda, which is generally friendly towards Buddhism. De Visser has speculated that the tengu may be descended from an ancient Shinto bird-demon which was syncretized with both the garuda and the tiāngǒu when Buddhism arrived in Japan. However, he found little evidence to support this idea.

A later version of the Kujiki, an ancient Japanese historical text, writes the name of Amanozako, a monstrous female deity born from the god Susanoo's spat-out ferocity, with characters meaning tengu deity (天狗神). The book describes Amanozako as a raging creature capable of flight, with the body of a human, the head of a beast, a long nose, long ears, and long teeth that can chew through swords. An 18th-century book called the Tengu Meigikō (天狗名義考) suggests that this goddess may be the true predecessor of the tengu, but the date and authenticity of the Kujiki, and of that edition, in particular, remain disputed.

== Evil spirits and angry ghosts ==
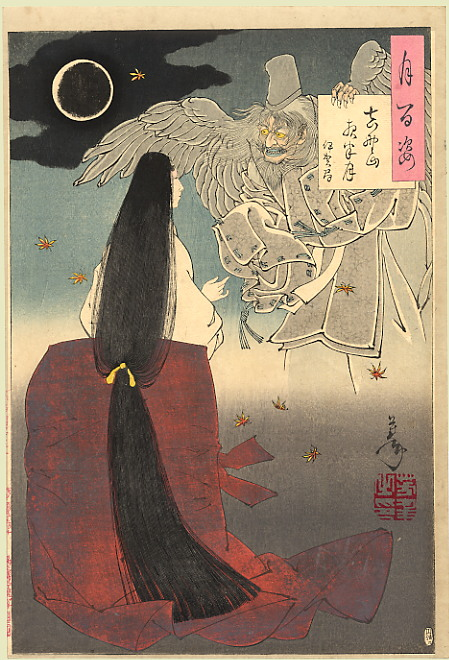
Iga no Tsubone confronts the tormented spirit of Sasaki no Kiyotaka, by Yoshitoshi. Sasaki's ghost appears with the wings and claws of a tengu.

The Konjaku Monogatarishū, a collection of stories published in the late Heian period, contains some of the earliest tales of tengu, already characterized as they would be for centuries to come. These tengu are the troublesome opponents of Buddhism, who mislead the pious with false images of the Buddha, carry off monks and drop them in remote places, possess women in an attempt to seduce holy men, rob temples, and endow those who worship them with unholy power. They often disguise themselves as priests or nuns, but their true form seems to be that of a kite.

Throughout the 12th and 13th centuries, accounts continued of tengu attempting to cause trouble in the world. They were now established as the ghosts of angry, vain, or heretical priests who had fallen on the "tengu-realm" (天狗道, tengudō). They began to possess people, especially women and girls, and speak through their mouths (kitsunetsuki). Still the enemies of Buddhism, the demons also turned their attention to the royal family. The Kojidan tells of an Empress who was possessed, and the Ōkagami reports that Emperor Sanjō was made blind by a tengu, the ghost of a priest who resented the throne.

One notorious tengu from the 12th century was himself the ghost of an emperor. The Hōgen Monogatari tells the story of Emperor Sutoku, who was forced by his father to abandon the throne. When he later raised the Hōgen Rebellion to take back the country from Emperor Go-Shirakawa, he was defeated and exiled to Sanuki Province in Shikoku. According to legend he died in torment, having sworn to haunt the nation of Japan as a great demon, and thus became a fearsome tengu with long nails and eyes like a kite's.

In stories from the 13th century, tengu began to abduct young boys as well as the priests they had always targeted. The boys were often returned, while the priests would be found tied to the tops of trees or other high places. All of the tengu's victims, however, would come back in a state near death or madness, sometimes after having been tricked into eating animal dung.

The tengu of this period were often conceived of as the ghosts of the arrogant, and as a result, the creatures have become strongly associated with vanity and pride. Today the Japanese expression tengu ni naru ("becoming a tengu") is still used to describe a conceited person.

== Great and small demons ==
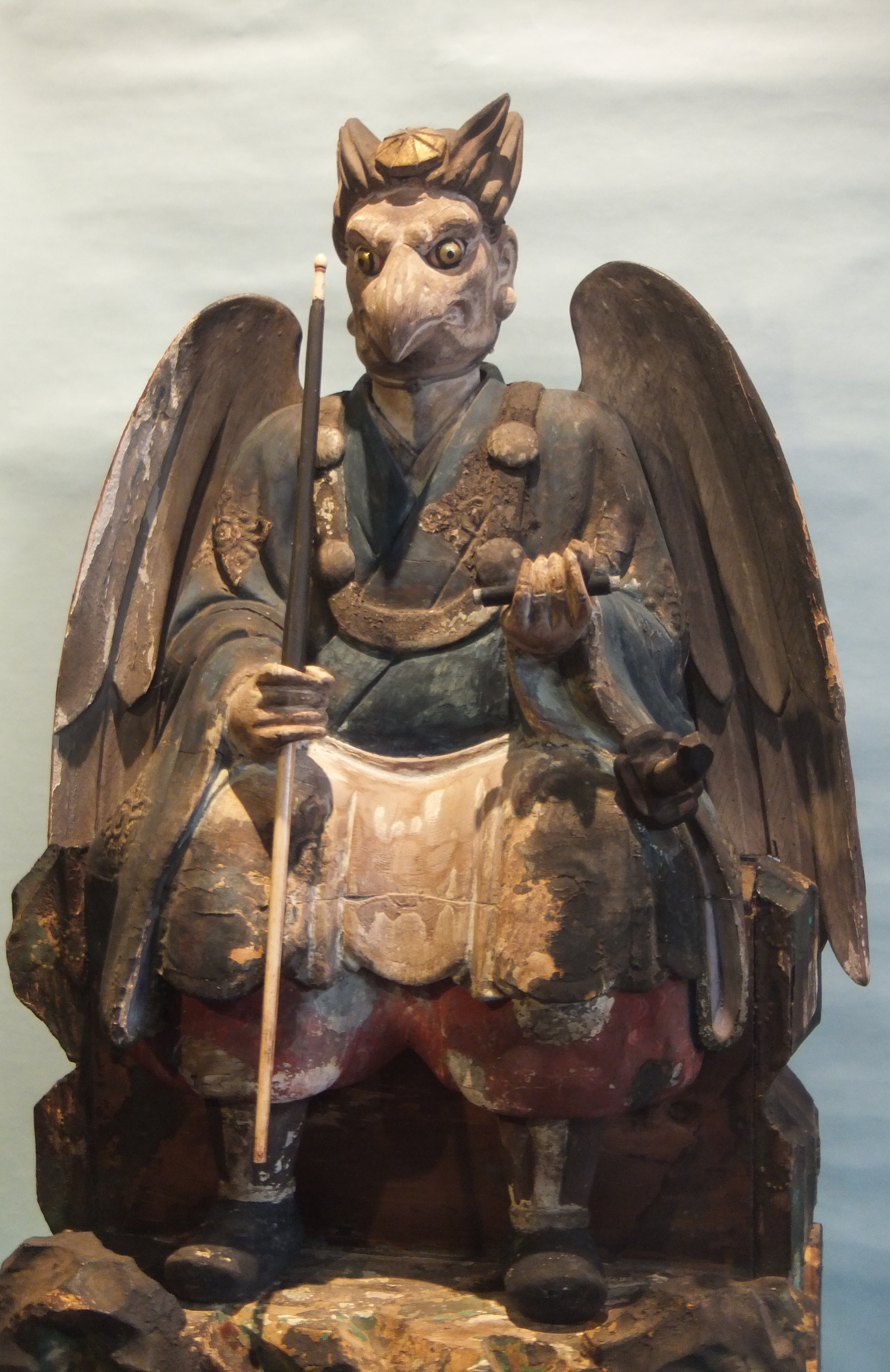
Crow Tengu, late Edo period (28×25×58 cm)

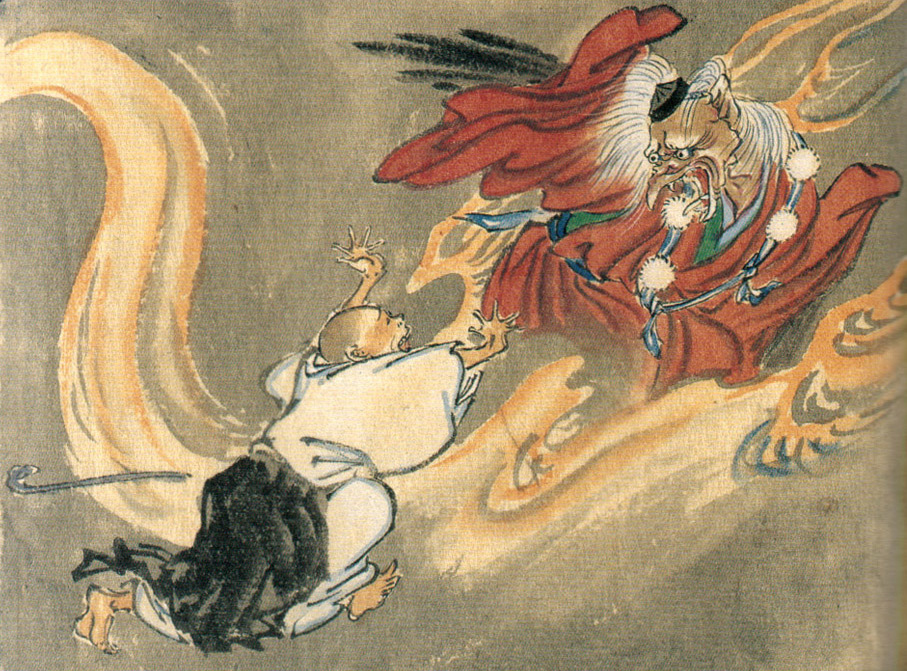
Tengu and a Buddhist monk, by Kawanabe Kyōsai. The tengu wears the cap and pom-pom sash of a follower of Shugendō.

In the Genpei Jōsuiki, written in the late Kamakura period, a god appears to Go-Shirakawa and gives a detailed account of tengu ghosts. He says that they fall onto the tengu road because, as Buddhists, they cannot go to Hell, yet as people with bad principles, they also cannot go to Heaven. He describes the appearance of different types of tengu: the ghosts of priests, nuns, ordinary men, and ordinary women, all of whom in life possessed excessive pride. The god introduces the notion that not all tengu are equal; knowledgeable men become daitengu (大天狗, greater tengu), but ignorant ones become kotengu (小天狗, small tengu).

The philosopher Hayashi Razan lists the greatest of these daitengu as Sōjōbō of Kurama, Tarōbō of Atago, and Jirōbō of Hira. The demons of Kurama and Atago are among the most famous tengu.

A section of the Tengu Meigikō, later quoted by Inoue Enryō, lists the daitengu in this order:

- Sōjōbō (僧正坊) of Mount Kurama
- Tarōbō (太郎坊) of Mount Atago
- Jirōbō (二郎坊) of the Hira Mountains
- Sanjakubō (三尺坊) of Mount Akiha
- Ryūhōbō (笠鋒坊) of Mount Kōmyō
- Buzenbō (豊前坊) of Mount Hiko
- Hōkibō (伯耆坊) of Mount Daisen
- Myōgibō (妙義坊) of Mount Ueno (Ueno Park)
- Sankibō (三鬼坊) of Itsukushima
- Zenkibō (前鬼坊) of Mount Ōmine
- Kōtenbō (高天坊) of Katsuragi
- Tsukuba-hōin (筑波法印) of Hitachi Province
- Daranibō (陀羅尼坊) of Mount Fuji
- Naigubu (内供奉) of Mount Takao
- Sagamibō (相模坊) of Shiramine
- Saburō (三郎) of Mount Iizuna
- Ajari (阿闍梨) of Higo Province

Daitengu are often pictured in a more human-like form than their underlings, and due to their long noses, they may also be called hanatakatengu (鼻高天狗, tall-nosed tengu). Kotengu may conversely be depicted as more bird-like. They are sometimes called Karasu-Tengu (烏天狗, crow tengu), or koppa- or konoha-tengu (木葉天狗, 木の葉天狗, foliage tengu). Inoue Enryō described two kinds of tengu in his Tenguron: the great daitengu, and the small, bird-like konoha-tengu who live in Cryptomeria trees. The konoha-tengu are noted in a book from 1746 called the Shokoku Rijin Dan (諸国里人談), as bird-like creatures with wings two meters across which were seen catching fish in the Ōi River, but this name rarely appears in literature otherwise.

Creatures that do not fit the classic bird or yamabushi image are sometimes called tengu. For example, tengu in the guise of wood-spirits may be called guhin (occasionally written kuhin) (狗賓, dog guests), but this word can also refer to tengu with canine mouths or other features. The people of Kōchi Prefecture on Shikoku believe in a creature called shibaten or shibatengu (シバテン, 芝天狗, lawn tengu), but this is a small childlike being who loves sumō wrestling and sometimes dwells in the water, and is generally considered one of the many kinds of kappa. Another water-dwelling tengu is the kawatengu (川天狗, river tengu) of the Greater Tokyo Area. This creature is rarely seen, but it is believed to create strange fireballs and be a nuisance to fishermen.

== Protective spirits and deities ==
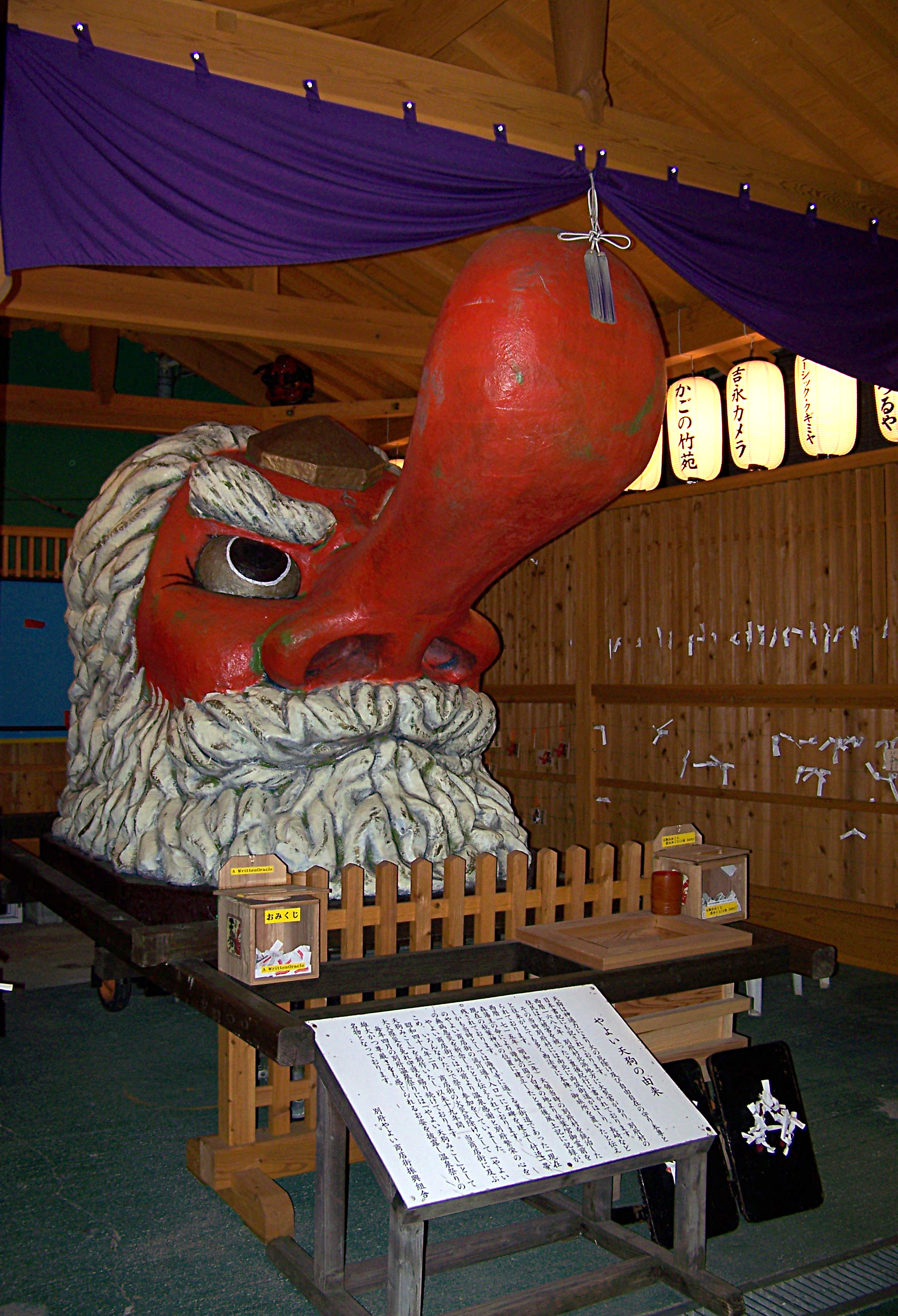
A tengu mikoshi (portable shrine) in the city of Beppu, Ōita Prefecture, on Kyūshū

In Yamagata Prefecture among other areas, thickets in the mountains during summer, there are several tens of tsubo of moss and sand that were revered as the "nesting grounds of tengu," and in mountain villages in the Kanagawa Prefecture, they would cut trees at night and were called "tengu daoshi" (天狗倒し, tengu fall), and mysterious sounds at night of a tree being cut and falling, or mysterious swaying sounds despite no wind, were considered the work of mountain tengu. It is also theorized that shooting a gun three times would make this mysterious sound stop. Besides this, in the Tone District, Gunma Prefecture, there are legends about the "tengu warai" (天狗笑い, tengu laugh) about how one would hear laughter out of nowhere, and if one simply presses on further, it'd become an even louder laugh, and if one tries laughing back, it'd laugh even louder than before, and the "tengu tsubute" (天狗礫, tengu pebble) (said to be the path that tengu go on) about how when walking on mountain paths, there would be a sudden wind, the mountain would rumble, and stones would come flying, and places tengu live such as "tenguda" (天狗田, tengu field), "tengu no tsumetogi ishi" (天狗の爪とぎ石, tengu scratching stone), "tengu no yama" (天狗の山, tengu mountain), "tengudani" (天狗谷, tengu valley), etc., in other words, "tengu territory" (天狗の領地) or "tengu guest quarters" (狗賓の住処). In Kanazawa's business district Owari in Hōreki 5 (1755), it is said that a "tengu tsubute" (天狗つぶて) was seen. In Mt. Ogasa, Shizuoka Prefecture, a mysterious phenomenon of hearing the sound of hayashi from the mountains in the summer was called "tengubayashi" (天狗囃子), and it is said to be the work of the tengu at Ogasa Jinja. On Sado Island (Sado, Niigata Prefecture), there were "yamakagura" (山神楽, mountain kagura), and the mysterious occurrence of hearing kagura from the mountains was said to be the work of a tengu. In Tokuyama, Ibi District, Gifu Prefecture (now Ibigawa), there were "tengu taiko" (天狗太鼓), and the sound of taiko (drums) from the mountains was said to be a sign of impending rain.

The Shasekishū, a book of Buddhist parables from the Kamakura period, makes a point of distinguishing between good and bad tengu. The book explains that the former are in command of the latter and are the protectors, not opponents, of Buddhism – although the flaw of pride or ambition has caused them to fall onto the demon road, they remain the same good, dharma-abiding persons they were in life.

The tengu's unpleasant image continued to erode in the 17th century. Some stories now presented them as much less malicious, protecting and blessing Buddhist institutions rather than menacing them or setting them on fire. According to a legend in the 18th-century Kaidan Toshiotoko (怪談登志男), a tengu took the form of a yamabushi and faithfully served the abbot of a Zen monastery until the man guessed his attendant's true form. The tengu's wings and huge nose then reappeared. The tengu requested a piece of wisdom from his master and left, but he continued, unseen, to provide the monastery with miraculous aid.

In the 18th and 19th centuries, tengu came to be feared as the vigilant protectors of certain forests. In the 1764 collection of strange stories Sanshu Kidan (三州奇談), a tale tells of a man who wanders into a deep valley while gathering leaves, only to be faced with a sudden and ferocious hailstorm. A group of peasants later tell him that he was in the valley where the guhin live, and anyone who takes a single leaf from that place will surely die. In the Sōzan Chomon Kishū (想山著聞奇集), written in 1849, the author describes the customs of the wood-cutters of Mino Province, who used a sort of rice cake called kuhin-mochi to placate the tengu, who would otherwise perpetrate all sorts of mischief. In other provinces a special kind of fish called okoze was offered to the tengu by woodsmen and hunters, in exchange for a successful day's work. The people of Ishikawa Prefecture have until recently believed that the tengu loathe mackerel, and have used this fish as a charm against kidnappings and hauntings by the mischievous spirits.

Tengu are worshipped as beneficial kami (gods or revered spirits) in various regions. For example, the tengu Saburō of Izuna is worshipped on that mountain and various others as Izuna Gongen (飯綱権現; "incarnation of Izuna"), one of the primary deities in Izuna Shugen, which also has ties to fox sorcery and the Dakini of Tantric Buddhism. Izuna Gongen is depicted as a beaked, winged figure with snakes wrapped around his limbs, surrounded by a halo of flame, riding on the back of a fox and brandishing a sword. Worshippers of tengu on other sacred mountains have adopted similar images for their deities, such as Sanjakubō (三尺坊) or Akiba Gongen (秋葉権現) of Akiba and Dōryō Gongen (道了権現) of Saijō-ji Temple in Odawara.

== In popular folk tales ==
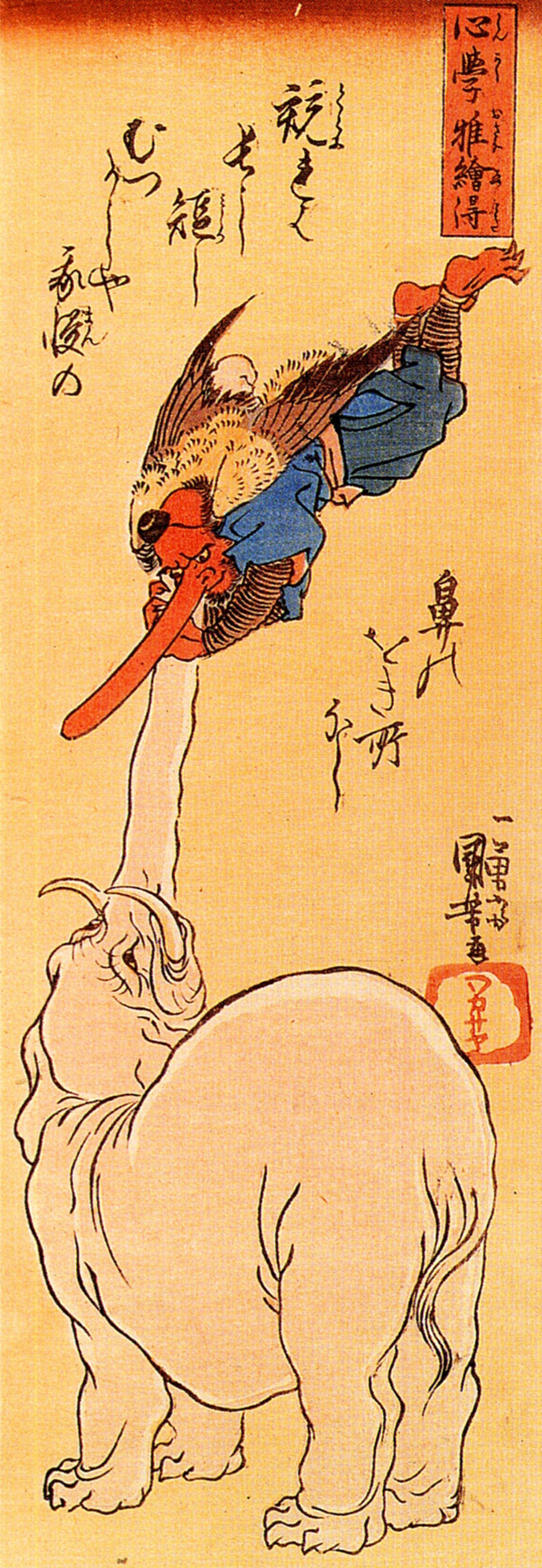
An elephant and a flying tengu, by Utagawa Kuniyoshi

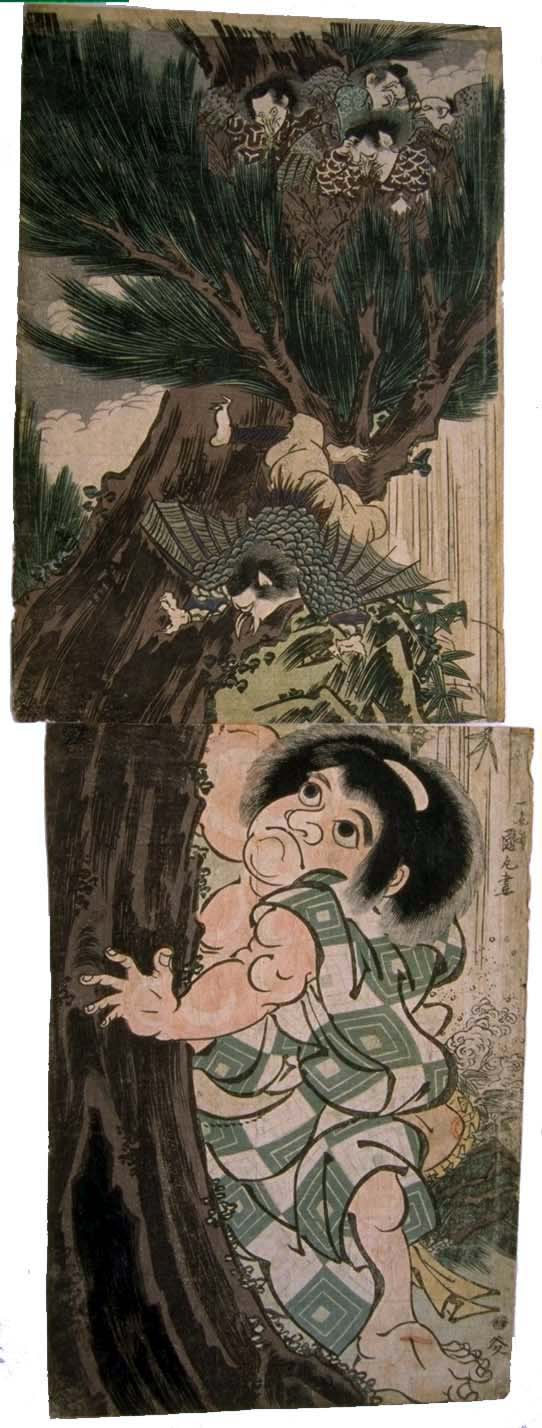
The folk hero Kintarō upsets a nest of small tengu.

Tengu appear frequently in the orally transmitted tales collected by Japanese folklorists. As these stories are often humorous, they tend to portray tengu as ridiculous creatures who are easily tricked or confused by humans. Some common folk tales in which tengu appear include:

- "The Tengu's Magic Cloak" (天狗の隠れみの, Tengu no Kakuremino): A boy looks through an ordinary piece of bamboo and pretends he can see distant places. A tengu, overwhelmed by curiosity, offers to trade it for a magic straw cloak that renders the wearer invisible. Having duped the tengu, the boy continues his mischief while wearing the cloak. Another version of this story tells of an ugly old man who tricks a tengu into giving him his magical cloak and causes mayhem for his fellow villagers. The story ends with the tengu regaining the coat through a game of riddle exchange and punishes the man by turning him into a wolf.
- "The Old Man's Lump Removed" (瘤取り爺さん, Kobu-tori Jiisan): An old man has a lump or tumor on his face. In the mountains he encounters a band of tengu making merry and joins their dancing. He pleases them so much that they want him to join them the next night, and offer a gift for him. In addition, they take the lump off his face, thinking that he will want it back and therefore have to join them the next night. An unpleasant neighbor, who also has a lump, hears of the old man's good fortune and attempts to repeat it, and steal the gift. The tengu, however, simply gives him the first lump in addition to his own, because they are disgusted by his bad dancing, and because he tried to steal the gift.
- "The Tengu's Fan" (天狗の羽団扇, Tengu no Hauchiwa) A scoundrel obtains a tengu's magic fan, which can shrink or grow noses. He secretly uses this item to grotesquely extend the nose of a rich man's daughter and then shrinks it again in exchange for her hand in marriage. Later he accidentally fans himself while he dozes, and his nose grows so long it reaches heaven, resulting in painful misfortune for him.
- "The Tengu's Gourd" (天狗の瓢箪, Tengu no Hyōtan): A gambler meets a tengu, who asks him what he is most frightened of. The gambler lies, claiming that he is terrified of gold or mochi. The tengu answers truthfully that he is frightened of a kind of plant or some other mundane item. The tengu, thinking he is playing a cruel trick, then causes money or rice cakes to rain down on the gambler. The gambler is of course delighted and proceeds to scare the tengu away with the thing he fears most. The gambler then obtains the tengu's magic gourd (or another treasured item) that was left behind.

== Martial arts ==
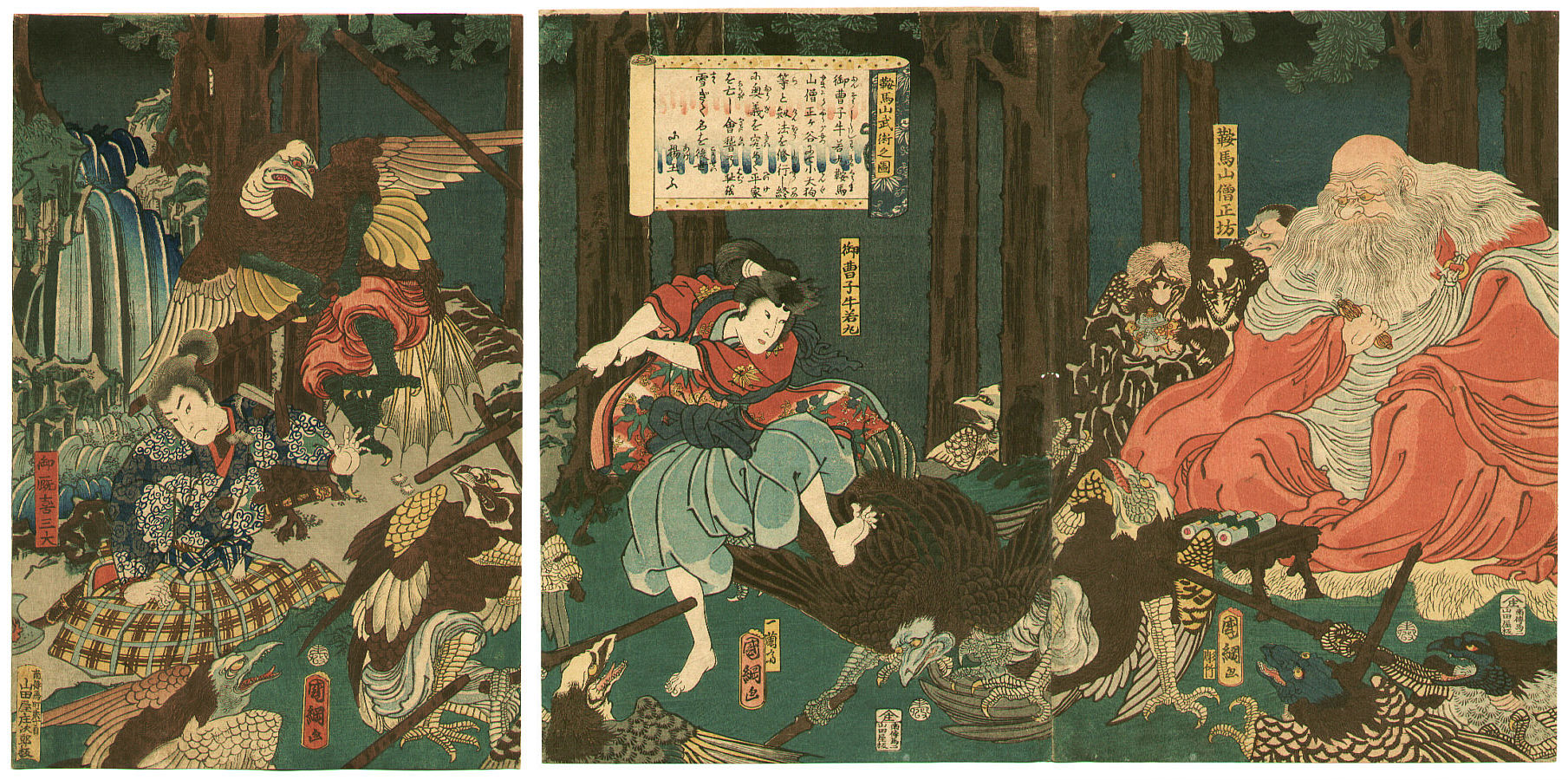
Ushiwaka-maru training with the tengu of Mount Kurama, by Kunitsuna Utagawa. This subject is very common in ukiyo-e.

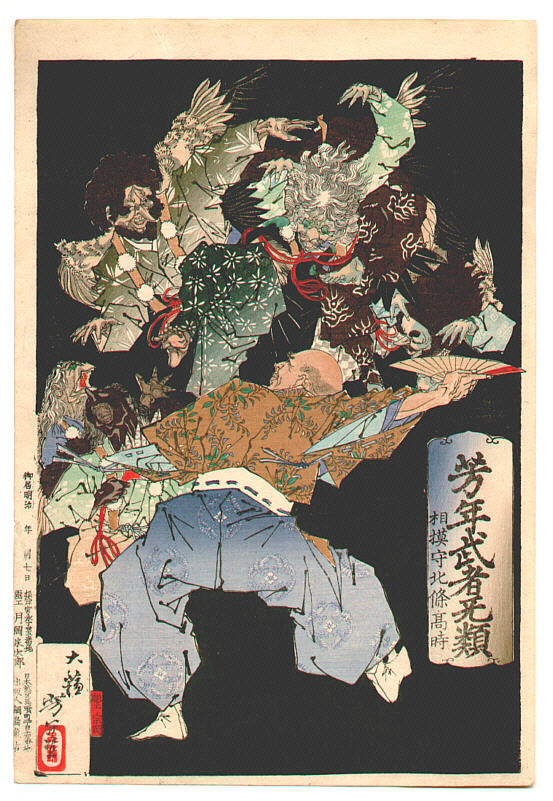
Japan's regent Hōjō Tokimune, who showed down the Mongols, fights off tengu

During the 14th century, the tengu began to trouble the world outside of the Buddhist clergy, and like their ominous ancestors the tiāngǒu, the tengu became creatures associated with war. Legends eventually ascribed to them great knowledge in the art of skilled combat.

This reputation seems to have its origins in a legend surrounding the famous warrior Minamoto no Yoshitsune. When Yoshitsune was a young boy going by the name of Ushiwaka-maru, his father, Yoshitomo, was assassinated by the Taira clan. Taira no Kiyomori, head of the Taira, allowed the child to survive on the grounds that he be exiled to the temple on Mount Kurama and become a monk. But one day in the Sōjō-ga-dani Valley, Ushiwaka encountered the mountain's tengu, Sōjōbō. This spirit taught the boy the art of swordsmanship so that he might bring vengeance on the Taira.

Originally the actions of this tengu were portrayed as another attempt by demons to throw the world into chaos and war, but as Yoshitsune's renown as a legendary warrior increased, his monstrous teacher came to be depicted in a much more sympathetic and honorable light. In one of the most famous renditions of the story, the Noh play Kurama Tengu, Ushiwaka is the only person from his temple who does not give up an outing in disgust at the sight of a strange yamabushi. Sōjōbō thus befriends the boy and teaches him out of sympathy for his plight.

Two stories from the 19th century continue this theme: In the Sōzan Chomon Kishū, a boy is carried off by a tengu and spends three years with the creature. He comes home with a magic gun that never misses a shot. A story from Inaba Province, related by Inoue Enryō, tells of a girl with poor manual dexterity who is suddenly possessed by a tengu. The spirit wishes to rekindle the declining art of swordsmanship in the world. Soon a young samurai appears to whom the tengu has appeared in a dream, and the possessed girl instructs him as an expert swordsman.

== In popular culture ==
Tengu continue to be popular subjects in modern fiction, both in Japan and other countries. They often appear among the many characters and creatures featured in Japanese cinema, animation, comics, role-playing games, and video games.

- The Dead or Alive fighting games features a tengu fighter known as Bankotsubo who represents the final boss in Dead or Alive 2. Additionally, a female human-like tengu named Nyotengu appears in Dead or Alive 5 Ultimate.
- The Unicode emoji character U+1F47A (👺) represents a tengu, under the name "Japanese Goblin".
- The Touhou Project series prominently features tengu as a species of youkai within the setting. No less than five named characters are tengu, three of which are recurring characters, and one of which is a major character.
- Nuzleaf and Shiftry from the Pokémon franchise are based on the tengu.
- The tengu are featured in the 2013 movie 47 Ronin, with their lord played by Togo Igawa.
- Tactics features a shinto onmyoji who spends his life searching for a tengu, whom he names Haruka and another tengu named Sugino. Each tengu represents a different type: Haruka is a "black" tengu who was born as such and is more powerful than "white" Sugino, who is noted to be a former human priest who grew too arrogant and is worshipped as a mountain god. They primarily appear as humans with wings.

== See also ==
- Eboshi-ori
- Leigong
- Matsuyama tengu
- Tiangou (China)
- Woodwose
- Karura
