= Dogs in Chinese mythology =

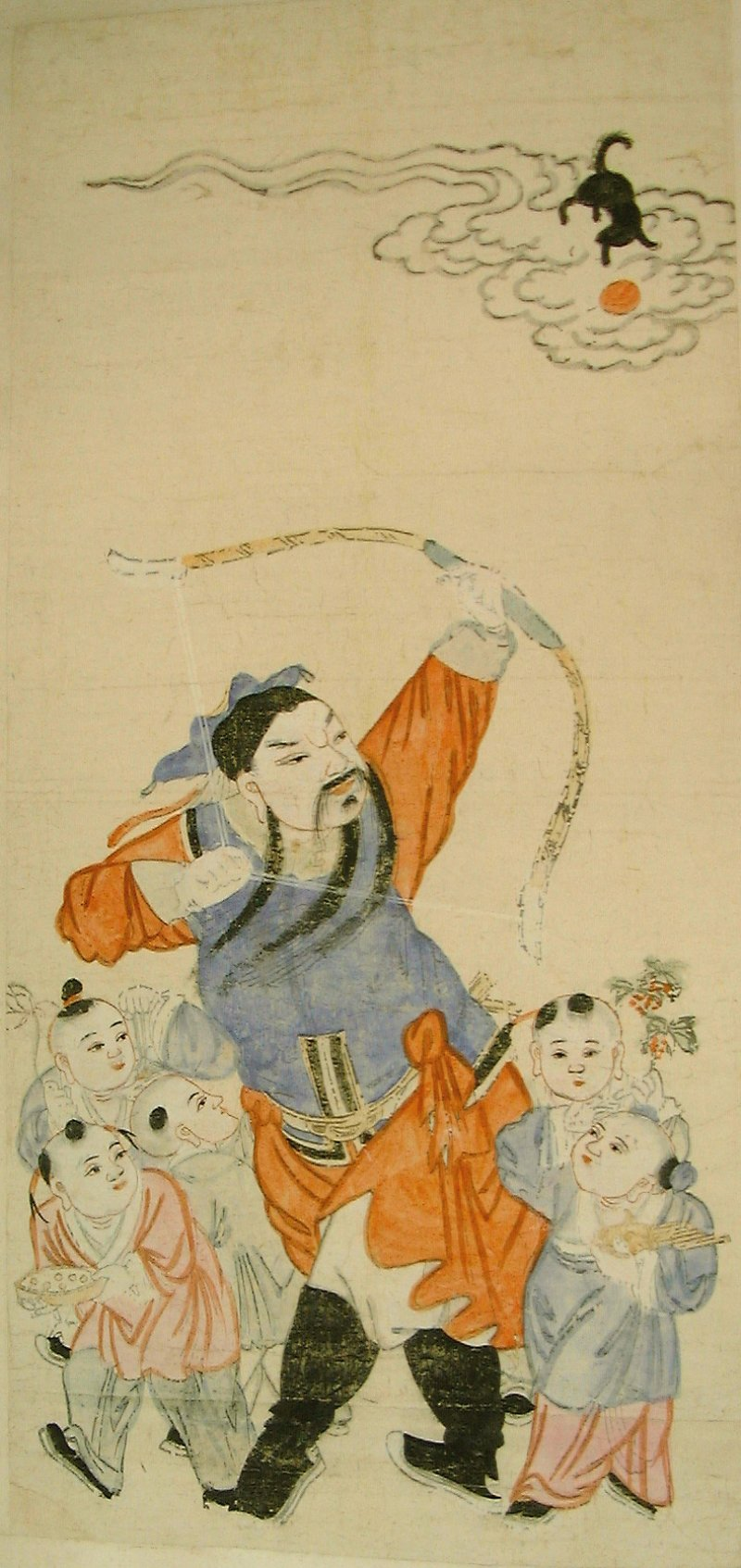
The immortal Zhang shooting at the Tiangou

Dogs are an important motif in Chinese mythology. These motifs include a particular dog which accompanies a hero, the dog as one of the twelve totem creatures for which years are named, a dog giving first provision of grain which allowed current agriculture, and claims of having a magical dog as an original ancestor in the case of certain ethnic groups.

== Myth versus history ==
Chinese mythology includes myths in Chinese and other languages, as transmitted by Han Chinese as well as other ethnic groups (of which fifty-six are officially recognized by the current administration of China).

In the study of historical Chinese culture, many of the stories that have been told regarding characters and events which have been written or told of the distant past have a double tradition: one which tradition which presents a more historicized and one which presents a more mythological version. This is also true of some accounts related to mythological dogs in China.

Historical accounts and anecdotes about dogs from ancient China and onwards exist in extant literary works, for example in the Shiji, by Sima Qian. Archaeological study provides substantial backing and supplemental knowledge in this regard.

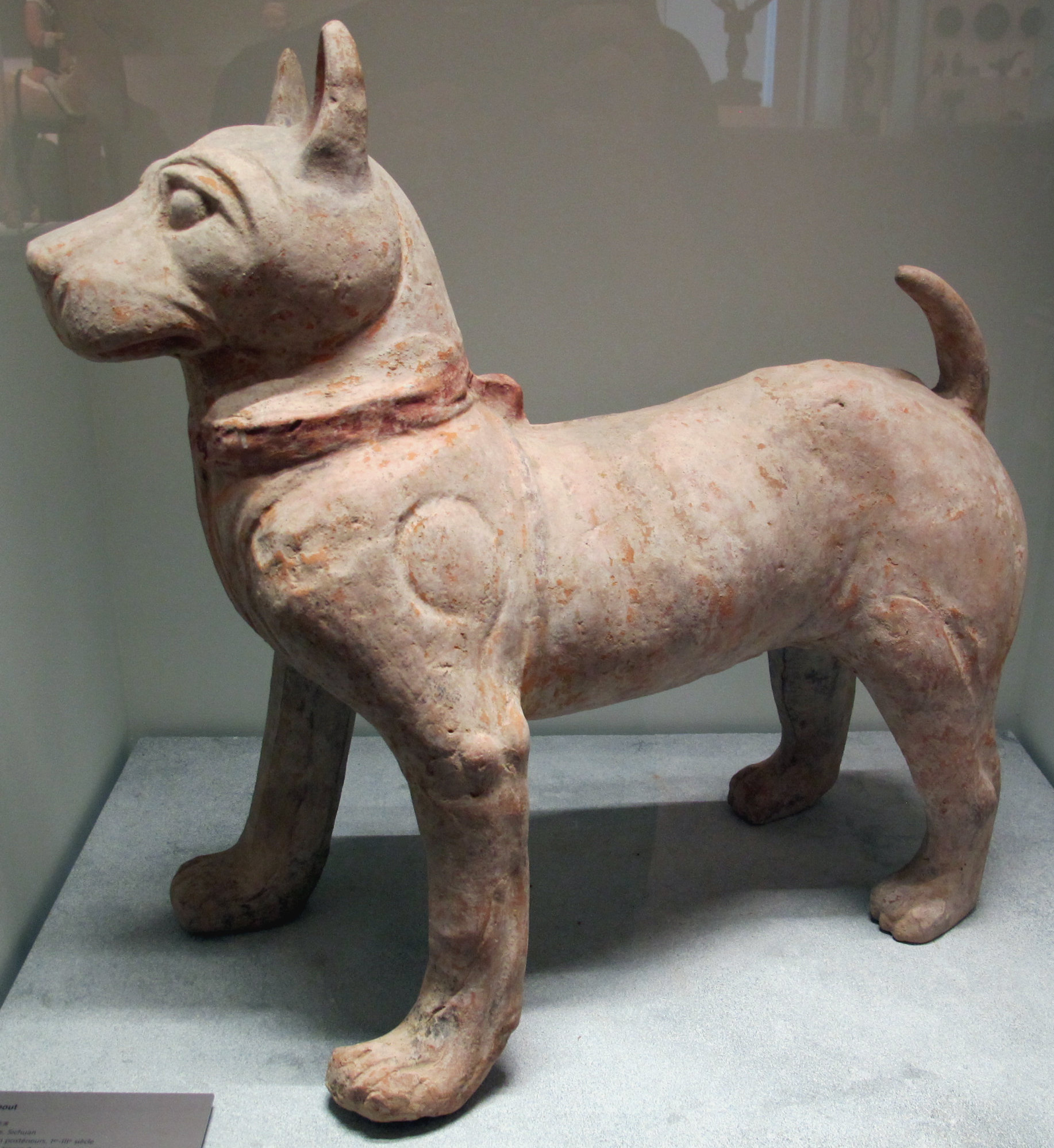
Later Han dynasty, a standing statue of a dog from Sichuan.

Despite any fantastic myths from China about dogs, real dogs have been familiar throughout China since prehistorical times (unlike certain exotic animals, such as lions or other creatures, whose real attributes may often only have been known indirectly).

Dogs also feature in various historical and legendary accounts or stories, found in the extensive literary records of China, although in some cases the lines between myth and ancient history are uncertain. However, in many myths, legends, or other accounts of dogs in Chinese literature, the dog or dogs are presented in ways that in have no appearance of the fanciful or fantastic (as opposed to the way other creatures may typically be handled in mythology, such as in the case of turtles, snakes, dragons, or often even horses).

== Names in cross-cultural comparison ==
Wolfram Eberhard points out that compared to other cultures it is "striking " that Chinese literature rarely has given names for dogs. This means that in the context of Chinese mythology, often a dog will play an important role, but that it will not be given a proper name, but rather being referred to as "dog".

As Chinese grammar does not require the use of definite or indefinite articles or marking for singular or plural number, there may be ambiguity regarding whether the reference to dog means "Dog" (proper name), "dogs", "a dog", "the dog", "some dogs", or "the dogs".

== Zodiacal dog ==
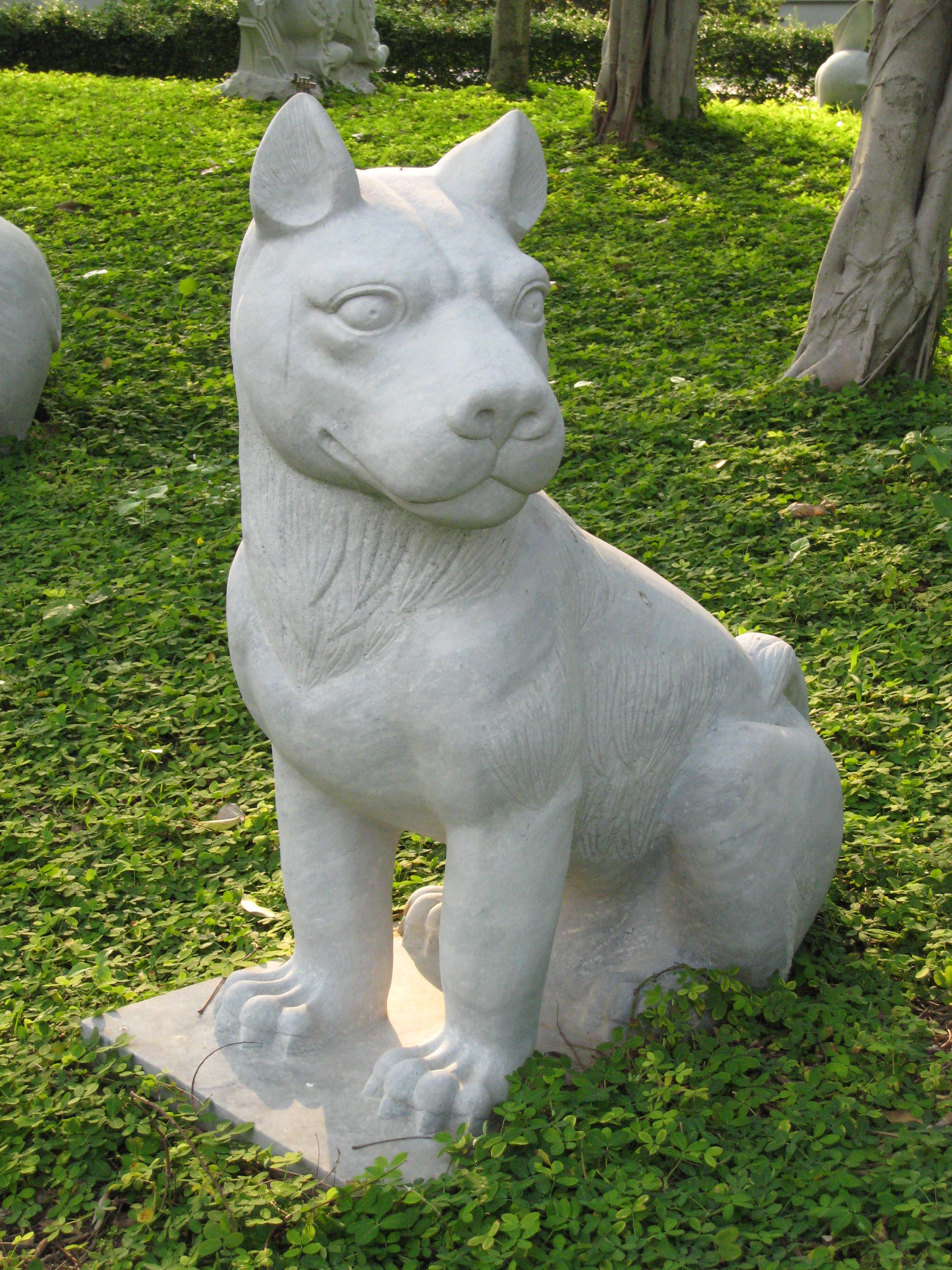
The Dog statue is one of the 12 Chinese Zodiacal creatures portrayed in the Kowloon Walled City Park in Kowloon City, Hong Kong.

For thousands of years, a twelve-year cycle named after various real or mythological animals has been used in Southeast Asia. This twelve-year cycle, sometimes referred to as the "Chinese zodiac," associates each year in turn with a certain creature, in a fixed order of twelve animals, after which it returns to the first in the order, the Rat. The eleventh in the cycle is the Dog.

One account is that the order of the beings-of-the-year is due to their order in a racing contest involving swimming across a river, in the Great Race. The reason for the Dog finishing the race second from last despite generally being a talented swimmer is explained as being due to its playful nature: the Dog played and frolicked along the way, thus delaying completing the course and reaching the finishing line.

The personalities of people born in Dog years are popularly supposed to share certain attributes associated with Dogs, such as loyalty or exuberance; however, this would be modified according to other considerations of Chinese astrology, such as the influences of the month, day and hour of birth, according to the traditional system of Earthly Branches, in which the zodiacal animals are also associated with the months and times of the day (and night), in twelve two-hour increments.

The Hour of the Dog is 7 to 9 p.m. and the Dog is associated with the ninth lunar month.

== Panhu ==
There are various myths and legends in which various ethnic groups claimed or were claimed to have had a divine dog as a forebear, one of these is the story of Panhu. The legendary Chinese sovereign Di Ku has been said to have a dog named Panhu. Panhu helped him win a war by killing the enemy general and bringing him his head and ended up with marriage to the emperor's daughter as a reward.

The dog carried his bride to the mountainous region of the south, where they produced numerous progeny. Because of their self-identification as descendants from these original ancestors, Panhu has been worshiped by the Yao people and the She people, often as King Pan, and the eating of dog meat tabooed. This ancestral myth is also has been found among the Miao people and Li people.

An early documentary source for the Pan-hu origin myth is by the Jin dynasty (266–420) author Gan Bao, who records this origin myth for a southern (that is, south of the Yangzi River) ethnic group which he refers to as "Man" (蠻).

=== Variations ===
There are various variations of the Panhu mythology. According to one version, the Emperor had promised his daughter in marriage as a reward to the one who brought back the enemy general's head, but due to the perceived difficulties of a dog marriage with a human bride (especially an imperial princess), the dog proposed to magically turn into a human being, by means of a process in which he would be sequestered beneath a bell for 280 days.

However, the curious emperor, unable to restrain himself, lifted up the rim of the bell on the 279th day: the spell was thus broken before the transformation was completed, and, although the rest of the body had been transformed to human, the head had not.

=== Culturally-relative interpretations ===
Victor Mair brings up the point that the idea of being descended from dogs may have a pejorative connotation or connotations. Whether this would be the case or not would be relative to assumed cultural evaluations of dogs versus humans.

== Erlang's dog ==
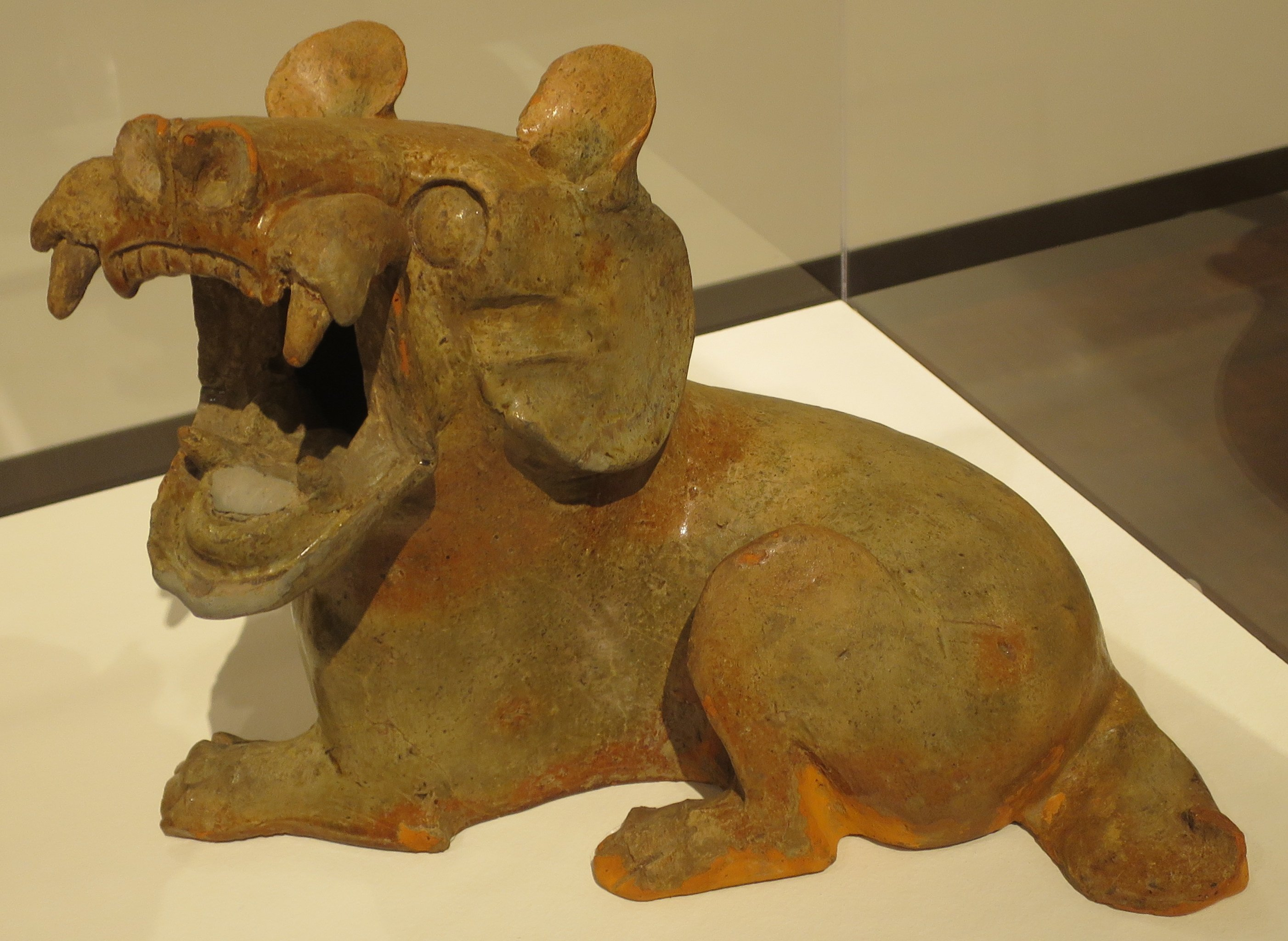
Dog, Han dynasty (206 BCE – 220 CE), earthenware with polychrome

Erlang Shen, a folk god, is said to have a dog named Xiaotian Quan (啸天犬; 'Sky Barking Hound', 'Howling Celestial Dog').

In the novel Investiture of the Gods, Yang Jian (assumed to be Erlang) sometimes sends his dog to bite his enemies.

In the novel, Journey to the West, Erlang's dog helps him fight Sun Wukong, preventing him from escaping by biting him in the leg. Later in Chapter 63, Sun Wukong, Erlang, and their companions battle against the Nine-Headed Prince when the dog defeats the enemy biting off one of monster's retractable heads. The prince then flees, choking on his own blood. Erlang lets him go, predicts he'll drown in his own blood.

== Tiangou ==
The Tiangou ("Heavenly Dog") has been said to resemble a black dog or meteor, which is thought to eat the sun or moon during an eclipse, unless frightened away.

== Obtaining grain ==
According to the myths of various ethnic groups, a dog provided humans with the first grain seeds enabling the seasonal cycle of planting, harvesting, and replanting staple agricultural products by saving some of the seed grains to replant, thus explaining the origin of domesticated cereal crops. This myth is common to the Buyi, Gelao, Hani, Miao, Shui, Tibetan, Tujia, and Zhuang peoples.

A version of this myth collected from ethnic Tibetan people in Sichuan tells that in ancient times grain was tall and bountiful, but that rather than being duly grateful for the plenty that people even used it for personal hygiene after defecation, which so angered the God of Heaven that he came down to earth to repossess it all.

However, a dog grasped his pant leg, piteously crying, and so moving God of Heaven to leave a few seeds from each type of grain with the dog, thus providing the seed stock of today's crops. Thus it is said that because humans owe their possession of grain seed stocks to a dog, people should share some of their food with dogs.

Another myth, of the Miao people, recounts the time of the distantly remote era when dogs had nine tails, until a dog went to steal grains from heaven, and lost eight of its tails to the weapons of the heavenly guards while making its escape, but bringing back grain seeds stuck onto its surviving tail. According to this, when Miao people hold their harvest celebration festival, the dogs are the first to be fed. The Zhuang and Gelao peoples have a similar myth explaining why it is that the ripe heads of grain stalks are curly, bushy, and bent – just so as is the tail of a dog.

== Ritual ==
In northern China, dog images made by cutting paper were thrown in the water as part of the ritual of the Double Fifth (Duanwu Festival) holiday, celebrated on the fifth day of the fifth lunar month, as an apotropaic magic act meant to drive away evil spirits. Paper dogs were also provided for protecting the dead.

== "Foo Dogs" ==
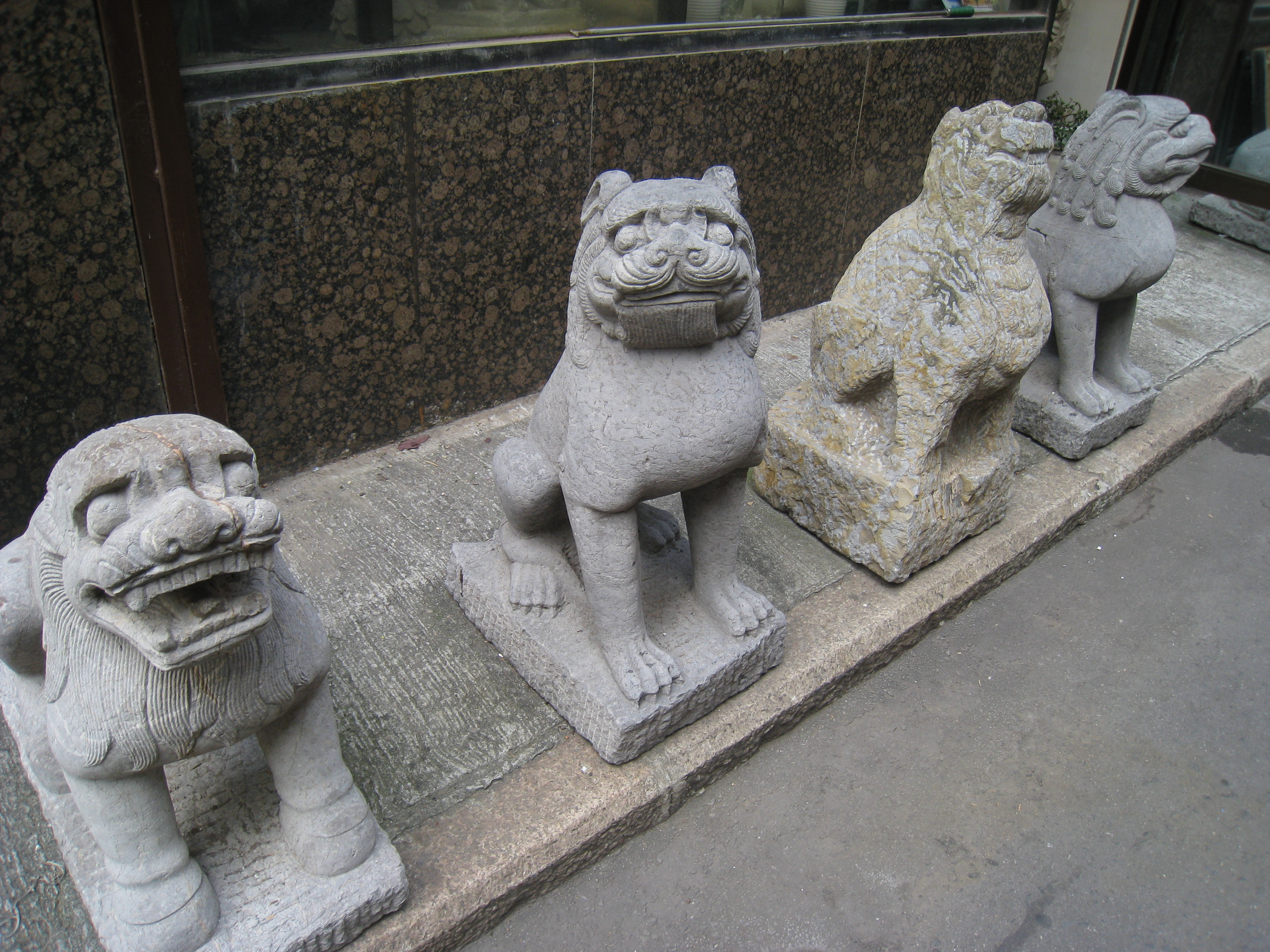
Chinese stone statue of "lions", showing pronounced dog-like features

Numerous statuary of Chinese guardian lions exist, which are often called "Fu Dogs" "Foo Dogs", "Fu Lions", "Fo Lions", and "Lion Dogs". Modern lions are not native in the area of China, except perhaps the extreme west; however, their existence was well known, and associated symbolism and ideas about lions were familiar; however, in China, artistic representations of lions tended to be dog-like. Indeed, "[t]he 'lion' which we see depicted in Chinese paintings and in sculpture bears little resemblance to the real animal, which, however, plays a big part in Chinese folklore." The reasons for referencing "guardian lions" as "dogs" in Western cultures may be obscure, however the phenomenon is well known.

== Other canids in Chinese mythology ==
Other members of the canidae family also figure in Chinese mythology, including wolves and foxes. The portrayal of these is usually quite different than in the case of dogs.

Tales and literature on foxes is especially extensive, with foxes often having magical qualities, such as being able to shift back and forth to human shape, live for incredible life spans, and to grow supernumerary tails (nine being common).

== See also ==
- Cynocephaly
- Dogs in ancient China
- Mosuo
