= Mount Kōmyō =

Mountain in Niigata Prefecture, Japan

Coordinates: 37°28′39″N 139°13′10″E

Mount Kōmyō (光明山, Kōmyō-san) is a mountain in Niigata Prefecture, Japan. It has an elevation of 879 metres (2,884 ft).
