= Zhang Xian (deity) =

Chinese mythological figure

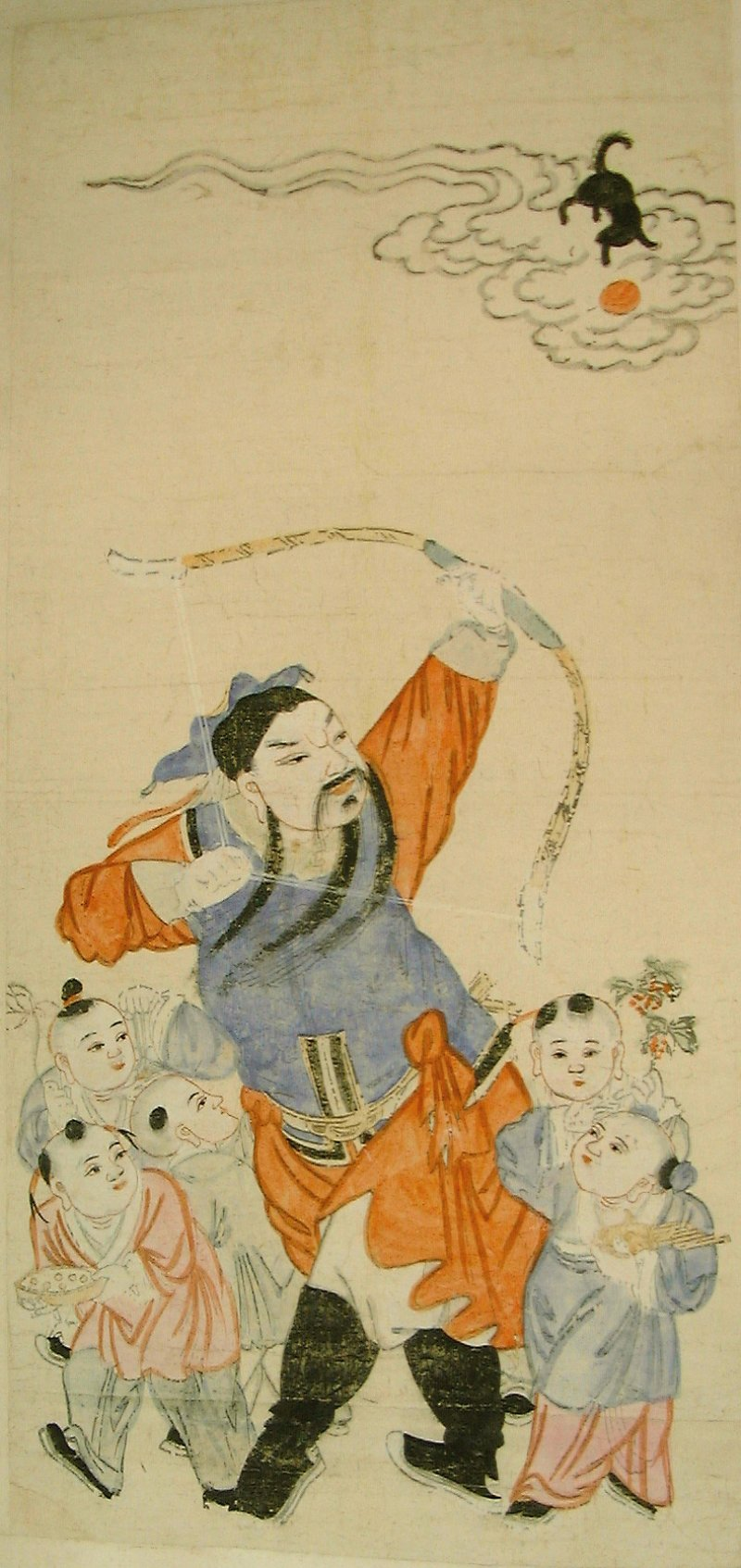
Zhang Xian shooting at a tiangou to protect his children clustered about him.

Zhang Xian (Chinese: 張仙; pinyin: Zhāng Xiān) is a Chinese god who is the enemy of the tiangou (Chinese: 天狗; pinyin: tiāngǒu; Wade–Giles: t'ien^{1}-kou^{3}; lit. 'Heavenly Dog'), a legendary creature in the form of a dog who creates eclipses. It is said that he protects his children from the dog with his bow and arrows. He is often depicted aiming at the sky, waiting for the beast to appear.

He is the god of birth and the protector of male children. Many sought him to give them male offspring and to protect their living children.

== See also ==
- Apotropaic magic, which wards away misfortune
