= Tiangou =

Legendary creature from China

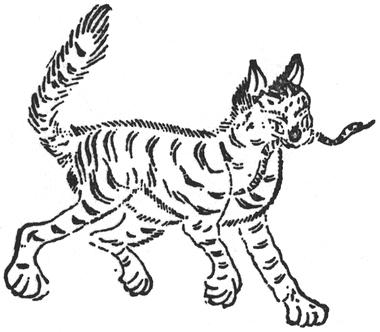
Tiangou from the Shan Hai Jing

The tiangou (Chinese: 天狗; pinyin: tiāngǒu; Wade–Giles: t'ien^{1}-kou^{3}; lit. 'Heavenly Dog') is a legendary creature from China. The tiangou resembles a black dog or meteor, and is thought to eat the Sun or Moon during an eclipse.

== Tiangou eating the Sun ==
As a good spirit, it has the appearance of a white-headed fox. It brings peace and tranquility, and gives protection from all sorts of troubles and robbers. It is referred to by astrologers as a constellation guardian of welfare. This asterism consists of seven stars. In ancient Chinese astronomy, Tiangou ('Heavenly Dog') referred to an asterism located in the region of Argo Navis.

As a bad spirit, it is a black dog that eats the Moon. According to the legends, as an interpretation of a lunar eclipse, after Houyi shot down the nine Suns in the sky, he was awarded with an immortality-granting pill by the Queen Mother of the West. Before he could eat it, his wife Chang'e consumed the elixir of immortality. Chang'e felt her body getting lighter and flew away. Seeing this, a black dog that Hou Yi was rearing went inside her room and licked the remains of the pill. He then chased after Chang'e, getting bigger and bigger. Chang'e, terrified, hid on the Moon. The black dog then ate the Moon, along with Chang'e.

After being informed of this, the Queen Mother of the West captured the dog. Surprised to see that the dog was actually Hou Yi's, she assigned him to guard the gates of heavens and bestowed upon him the title of Tiangou. Tiangou spat the Moon and Chang'e back out, and Chang'e continued living on the Moon.

== Battle with Zhang Xian ==
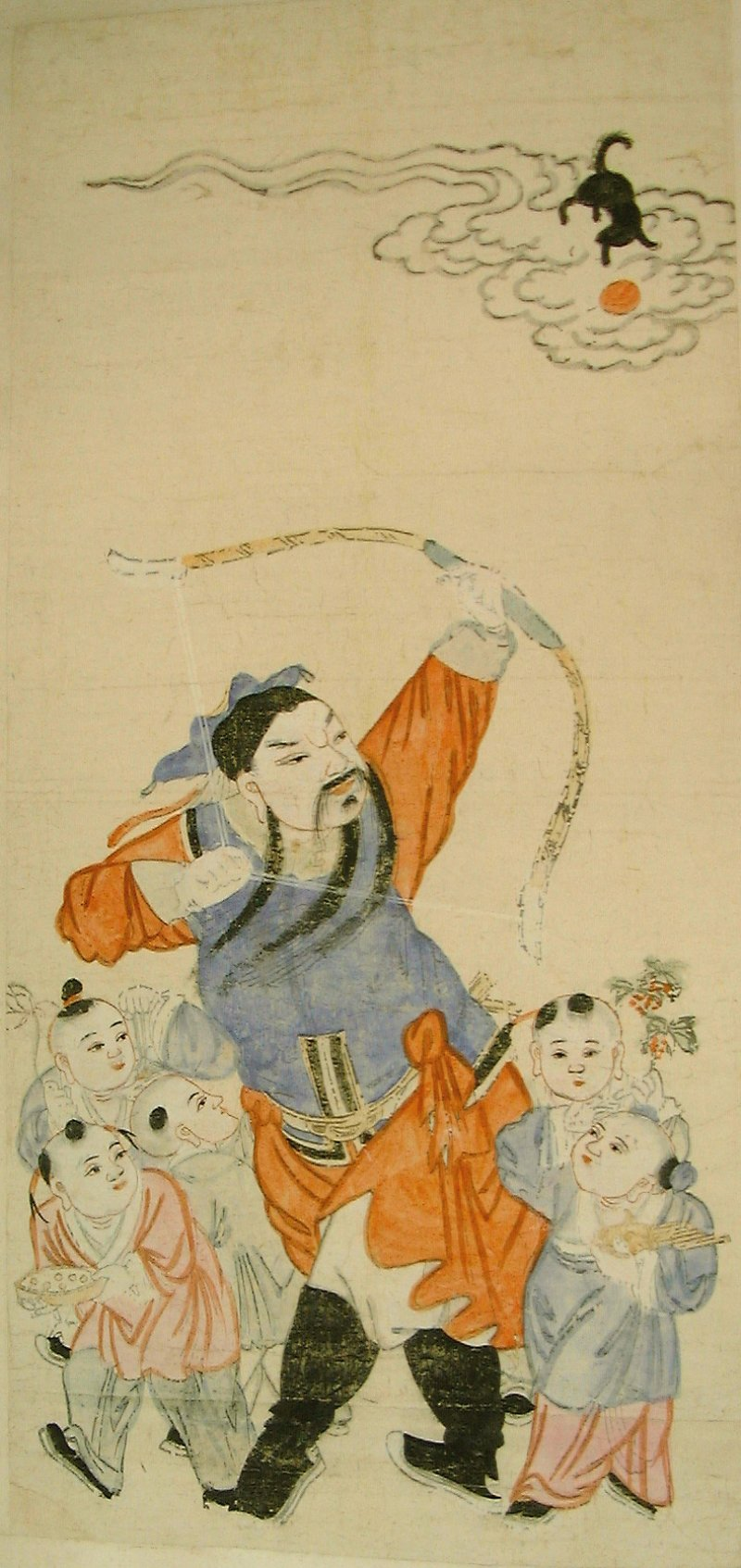
Zhang Xian shooting at a tiangou to protect his children clustered about him.

Zhang Xian (Chinese: 張仙; pinyin: Zhāng Xiān) is the enemy of the tiangou. It is said that he protects his children from the dog god with his bow and arrows. He is often depicted aiming at the sky, waiting for the beast to appear.

He is the god of birth and the protector of male children. Many sought for him to give them male offspring and to protect their living sons.

== Meaning in Japan ==
The term tengu and the characters used to write it may be borrowed from the name of tiangou, though this is still to be confirmed. Despite the characters, both creatures are independent mythological creatures with no common ancestor or origin. A tengu is usually depicted as a bird or man with a long nose and other bird-like characteristics, while the tiangou is a dog.

== See also ==
- Bulgae (Korea)
- Dog (Chinese mythology)
- Fenrir, the wolf of Norse mythology whose sons Sköll and Hati Hróðvitnisson swallow the Sun and Moon during Ragnarök
- Hellhound
- Tengu (Japan)
- Markoláb (Hungary)
