= List of The Tale of the Heike characters =

This is a list of the characters that appear in The Tale of the Heike.

== A ==
- Ario, a loyal page boy in the service of Shunkan, who looked after him since he was young. He sought Shunkan out at Kikai-ga-shima and looked after him during his exile.
- Taira no Atsumori, a young warrior known for his death in single combat at the hands of Kumagae no Jirô Naozane. He was well known for his skill with the flute.

== B ==
- Saito Musashibo Benkei, a Sohei who served Minamoto no Yoshitsune. He is known for his immense strength, courage, and loyalty. He held back Minamoto no Yoritomo's forces while his master committed seppuku.

== F ==
- Fukushō (副将, lit. "Vice-Commander", a nickname given to Taira no Yoshimune a.k.a. Taira no Nobumune by his father), son of Taira no Munemori, beheaded at age 7 (age 8 Japanese style) on the orders of Minamoto no Yoshitsune (see Heike Monogatari, Book XII, Chapter 14)

== G ==
- Giō, a Shirabyoshi dancer who won the heart of Taira no Kiyomori. After losing his favor to Hotoke, she renounced the world and became a nun.
- Retired Emperor Go-Shirakawa, father of Retired Emperor Takakura and grandfather of Emperor Antoku. He strove to maintain power after retiring, but soon realized he was losing his control to Taira no Kiyomori. Though unsuccessful in beating Taira no Kiyomori in life, he would live to see the eventual downfall of the Taira clan.

== H ==
- Hotoke, a young Shirabyoshi dancer who took the place of the older Giō in the eyes of Taira no Kiyomori. Her name is Japanese for Buddha. After realizing that she too will eventually befall the same fate as Giō, she also becomes a nun.

== K ==
- Kajiwara Kagetoki, a Minamoto warrior who held a grudge against Minamoto no Yoshitsune. Through his slander, he eventually convinced Minamoto no Yoritomo to turn against his brother Minamoto no Yoshitsune.
- Imai no Shirô Kanehira, close friend of Minamoto no Yoshinaka and the son of his wet nurse. They would later die together at the Battle of Awazu against the forces of Minamoto no Noriyori.
- Kenreimon-In, also known as Taira no Tokuko. Daughter of Taira no Kiyomori who becomes a consort to Emperor Takakura and gives birth to Emperor Antoku. Became a nun later in life.
- Kiô, loyal Minamoto soldier under the command of Minamoto no Nakatsuna. Pretends to join the Taira to retrieve Minamoto no Nakatsuna's prized horse from Taira no Munemori.
- Taira no Kiyomori, head of the Taira clan at the peak of its power. Established the first samurai-dominated government in Japanese history. He becomes a monk later in life, but even in doing so he does not lose his influence in political matters. His eventual death marked the downfall of the Taira. None of his successors were as accomplished in their leadership abilities.
- Taira no Koremori, son of Taira no Shigemori.
- Kumagae no Jirô Naozane, known for killing the young warrior Taira no Atsumori at the battle of Ichi-no-tani. He later shows great remorse for this act and becomes a priest.

== M ==
- Archbishop Meiun, also known as the Tendai abbot. He is exiled by Retired Emperor Go-Shirakawa as a punishment for attacking the capital. Taira no Kiyomori opposed his exile.
- Prince Mochihito, son of Retired Emperor Go-Shirakawa who was passed over by Emperor Takakura for the throne. Through his support of the Minamoto he was responsible for the start of the Genpei War.
- Mongaku, a particularly austere monk. He convinced Minamoto no Yoritomo to leave his exile and rise up against the Taira by bringing him the skull of his father. He also convinced Retired Emperor Go-Shirakawa to pardon Minamoto no Yoritomo.
- Fujiwara no Motofusa, held the position of Regent, the highest office in the country. He punishes the attendants of Taira no Kiyomori's grandson, Taira no Sukemori, for not showing proper respect to an imperial procession. Taira no Kiyomori gets revenge for his grandson by sending men to cut off the hair of Motofusa's attendants. When Taira no Shigemori learns of these events, he has all of the men fired.
- Taira no Munemori, son of Taira no Kiyomori, and younger brother of Taira no Shigemori. He became the head of the Taira clan after Taira no Shigemori's unexpected death.

== N ==
- Minamoto no Nakatsuna, elder son of Minamoto no Yorimasa. Was forced to give his prized horse to Taira no Munemori. This horse was later retrieved by one of his loyal soldiers, Kiô.
- Fujiwara no Narichika, father of Fujiwara no Naritsune. He was first exiled, and then executed by the Taira for his participation in the Shishigatani Incident.
- Fujiwara no Naritsune, son of Fujiwara no Narichika and conspirator in the Shishigatani Incident. He was exiled to Kikai-ga-shima, but was later granted amnesty for the sake of the unborn Emperor Antoku.
- Emperor Nijo, abdicates the throne to his particularly young son Emperor Rokujo, who was two. Caused a conflict with his father, Retired Emperor Go-Shirakawa, when he forced a former Senior Grand Empress to become his consort. The ceremonies at his funeral caused a conflict between the Enryakuji monks and the Miidera monks.
- Taira no Norimori, younger brother of Taira no Kiyomori and father-in-law of Fujiwara no Naritsune. He successfully pleads with Taira no Kiyomori to spare Fujiwara no Naritsune's life.

== R ==
- Rokudai Gozen, last descendant of the Taira clan, son of Taira no Koremori, grandson of Taira no Shigemori and great-grandson of Taira no Kiyomori. First reprieved by Minamoto no Yoritomo when he was ca. 12 years old (13 years old Japanese style), but then beheaded when he was ca. 29 years old (30 years old Japanese style) after he had become a monk. The last three chapters of the 12th book of the Heike Monogatari deal with his story.
- Emperor Rokujo, child emperor who was the son of Emperor Nijo. He took the throne at the age of two. He soon abdicated and the Taira's choice, Emperor Takakura, took his place.

== S ==
- Saiko, a close confidant to Retired Emperor Go-Shirakawa who was largely responsibly for the Shishigatani Incident. He was executed by Taira no Kiyomori.
- Sanemori, a Taira warrior who stays behind to fight the Minamoto even after most of his comrades have left. It is later revealed he is actually over 70 and dyed his hair to avoid pity from the enemy.
- Fujiwara no Sanesada, was passed over (by a Taira) on an imperial appointment he expected to receive. Unlike Fujiwara no Narichika, instead of rebelling, he chose to win the appointment by gaining favor with Taira no Kiyomori by honoring the shrine of the Taira clan.
- Shunkan, a monk who took part in the Shishigatani Incident to overthrow Taira no Kiyomori. After this plot failed, he was exiled, alone with Taira no Yasuyori and Fujiwara no Naritsune, to Kikai-ga-shima. Later when Taira no Tokuko was having birthing problems, Taira no Kiyomori granted Taira no Yasuyori and Fujiwara no Naritsune amnesty, but did not pardon Shunkan. He eventually committed suicide by ceasing to consume food.
- Taira no Shigehara, son of Taira no Kiyomori and younger brother of Taira no Shigemori. He is the only one of Taira no Kiyomori's sons to be captured alive. He takes Buddhist vows before being executed.
- Taira no Shigemori, son and heir of Taira no Kiyomori. He often took the role of the voice of reason with his advice to his father, and was not afraid to disagree with him. He died of a mysterious illness and his loss was a striking blow to the Taira clan – no other clan head was nearly as capable as Taira no Shigemori.
- Taira no Sukemori, son of Taira no Shigemori, and grandson of Taira no Kiyomori. He was chastised and whipped by Fujiwara no Motofusa for not showing proper respect during an imperial procession. This act angered Taira no Kiyomori and he retaliated on his grandson's behalf. His father, Taira no Shigemori, on the other hand, felt his son was at fault and disagreed with his father. He was ancestor of Oda Nobunaga from his son Taira no Chikazane.

== T ==
- Taira no Tadamori, father of Taira no Kiyomori. Consolidated the influence of the Taira clan and helped them gain Imperial favor.
- Retired Emperor Takakura, son of Retired Emperor Go-Shirakawa and father of Emperor Antoku. Took Kenreimon-In, a member of the Taira family, as his imperial consort. His mother was also a member of the Taira family.
- Retired Emperor Toba, an influential force after abdicating the throne. His support of Emperor Go-Shirakawa against Emperor Sutoku lead to the Hogen Disturbance.
- Taira no Tokuko, also known as Kenreimon-In. Daughter of Taira no Kiyomori, and mother of Emperor Antoku. She was the last Imperial Heike survivor at the battle of Dan-no-ura.
- Tomoe Gozen, female samurai who fought for Minamoto. She was one of Minamoto no Yoshinaka's most highly skilled warriors.

== Y ==
- Taira no Yasuyori, conspirator in the Shishigatani Incident. He was exiled to Kikai-ga-shima, but was later granted amnesty for the sake of the unborn Emperor Antoku.
- Nasu no Yoichi, a highly skilled archer who fought for the Minamoto during the Genpei war. At the Battle of Yashima, he is lauded for hitting a fan from a very far distance, answering a Taira challenge.
- Minamoto no Yorimasa, supported Prince Mochihito's bid for the Imperial Throne. Sent out a call to other Minamoto leaders in his struggle to fight the Taira.
- Minamoto no Yoritomo, also known as the Kamakura Lord. The main Minamoto general and half-brother to Minamoto no Yoshitsune and Minamoto no Noriyori. He was exiled, rather than killed by the Taira after the Heiji Disturbance. He is responsible for establishing the first Shogunate.
- Minamoto no Yoshinaka, also known as Kiso no Kanja Yoshinaka. A Minamoto leader who is cousin to Minamoto no Yoritomo. He determines to fight against the Taira from his position in the West. He is later defeated by Minamoto no Yoshitsune at the decree of Retired Emperor Go-Shirakawa.
- Minamoto no Yoshitsune, also known as Kurô Tayû no Hôgan Yoshitsune. Half-brother to Minamoto no Yoritomo and Minamoto no Noriyori. He led the Minamoto forces during many of the decisive battles against the Taira.
- Minamoto no Yukiie, uncle to Minamoto no Yoshinaka, Minamoto no Yoritomo, Minamoto no Yoshitsune, and Minamoto no Noriyori. Initially fought alongside Minamoto no Yoshinaka but later betrayed him for Minamoto no Yoritomo.
