= Shunkan =

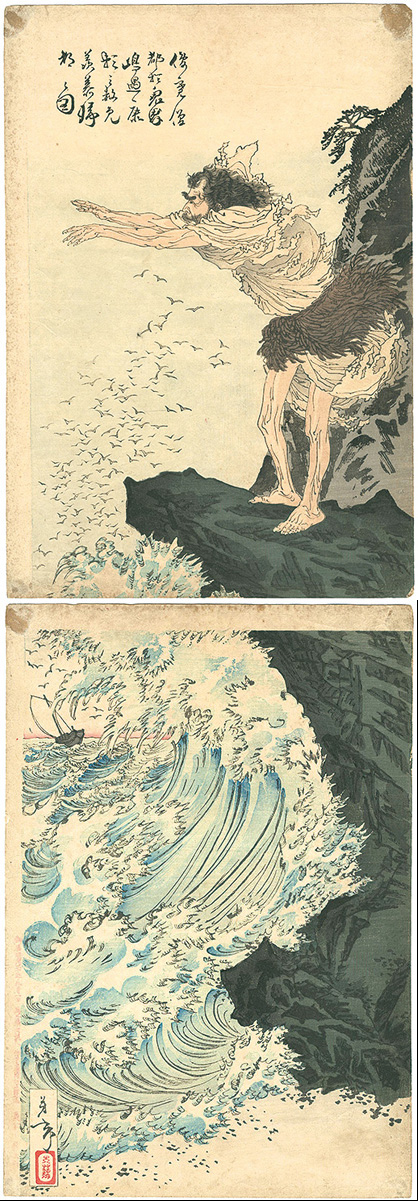
Shunkan depicted on an 1887 vertical diptych.

Shunkan (俊寛; Japanese pronunciation: [ɕɯꜜŋ.kaɴ], c. 1143 – 1179) was a Japanese monk who, after taking part in the Shishigatani plot to overthrow Taira no Kiyomori, was exiled along with two others to Kikai-ga-shima. His story is featured in the Heike monogatari, and in a number of traditional derivative works, including the Noh play Shunkan and jōruri play Heike Nyogo-ga-shima. Twentieth century authors Kan Kikuchi and Ryūnosuke Akutagawa also produced works entitled Shunkan.

== Biography ==
Shunkan was a member of the Murakami Genji branch of the Minamoto samurai clan, and the son of Hōin Kanga, a priest of the Buddhist temple Ninna-ji. He served Emperor Go-Shirakawa as a close aide and was associated with the Hōsshō-ji.

In 1177, he met with a number of others in secret in his mountain villa in Shishigatani (some sources, such as the Gukanshō, say the villa belonged to someone else), and plotted to overthrow Daijō Daijin Taira no Kiyomori who, along with other members of the Taira clan, dominated and controlled the Imperial government. The plot was discovered before any actual action was taken, and Shunkan was exiled, along with Fujiwara no Narichika, Narichika's son Fujiwara no Naritsune, and Taira no Yasunori, to an island called Kikai-ga-shima, south of Kyūshū's Satsuma province. There is debate as to whether or not this was the same place as the island bearing the name Kikai today.

Later that year, according to the Heike monogatari, when the Imperial consort Taira no Tokuko was pregnant with the future Emperor Antoku and was having difficulties, Kiyomori, her father, granted amnesty to Yasuyori and Naritsune, in order to appease their angry spirits, in the hopes of easing his daughter's pain. Shunkan was thus left alone on the island, the fourth exile Narichika having been executed by the Taira some time before.

He was found two years later, in 1179, by a monk from his temple by the name of Ariō, who brought a letter from Shunkan's daughter. Having already sunk into deep despair during his time alone on the island, Shunkan read the letter and made the decision to commit suicide. He refused food, and died of starvation. Ariō then brought the monk's ashes and bones back to the capital.

== Ashizuri ==
The manner in which Shunkan drags his feet on the beach is referred to as ashizuri. Shunkan's attitude after he is left behind is often described as childlike and as though he is having a temper tantrum. Earlier years often had him depicted as a child in illustrations and the idea that Shunkan's tantrum was childish persisted for years. However, greater attention is paid to the ashiziri. In fact, each different variation and translation of the Tale of the Heike remains consistent in that great detail is paid to Shunkan's ashiziri. This technique of foot-dragusually in both prints and series, mainly, those of the Utagawa school. In Kabuki, the motif of vengeful spi ging that Shunkan performs after being left on the island is notable for being similar to techniques used in Kabuki theatre.

Shunkan is a figure that appears often in the theatre of Kabuki,

== Legacy ==
The present location of Kikai Island is unclear, but it is believed to be one of the following:

- Iōjima, Kagoshima: A bronze statue of Shunkan was erected in May, 1995. Part of the Kikai Caldera.
- Kikai, Kagoshima: Contains a grave and bronze statue of Shunkan. According to Suzuki Hisashi, the anthropologist who examined the grave, the excavated bones were long-faced cranial bones belonging to a noble suggesting that they belong to a high class person from outside the island.
- Iōjima, Nagasaki: Contains a grave of Shunkan.
