= Shunkan (play) =

Noh play

俊寛
- Category: 4th — miscellaneous
- Characters: shite Shunkan tsure Naritsune tsure Taira no Yasuyori aikyōgen boatman waki messenger
- Place: Kikaigashima, Kyūshū
- Time: circa 1178
- Sources: Heike monogatari

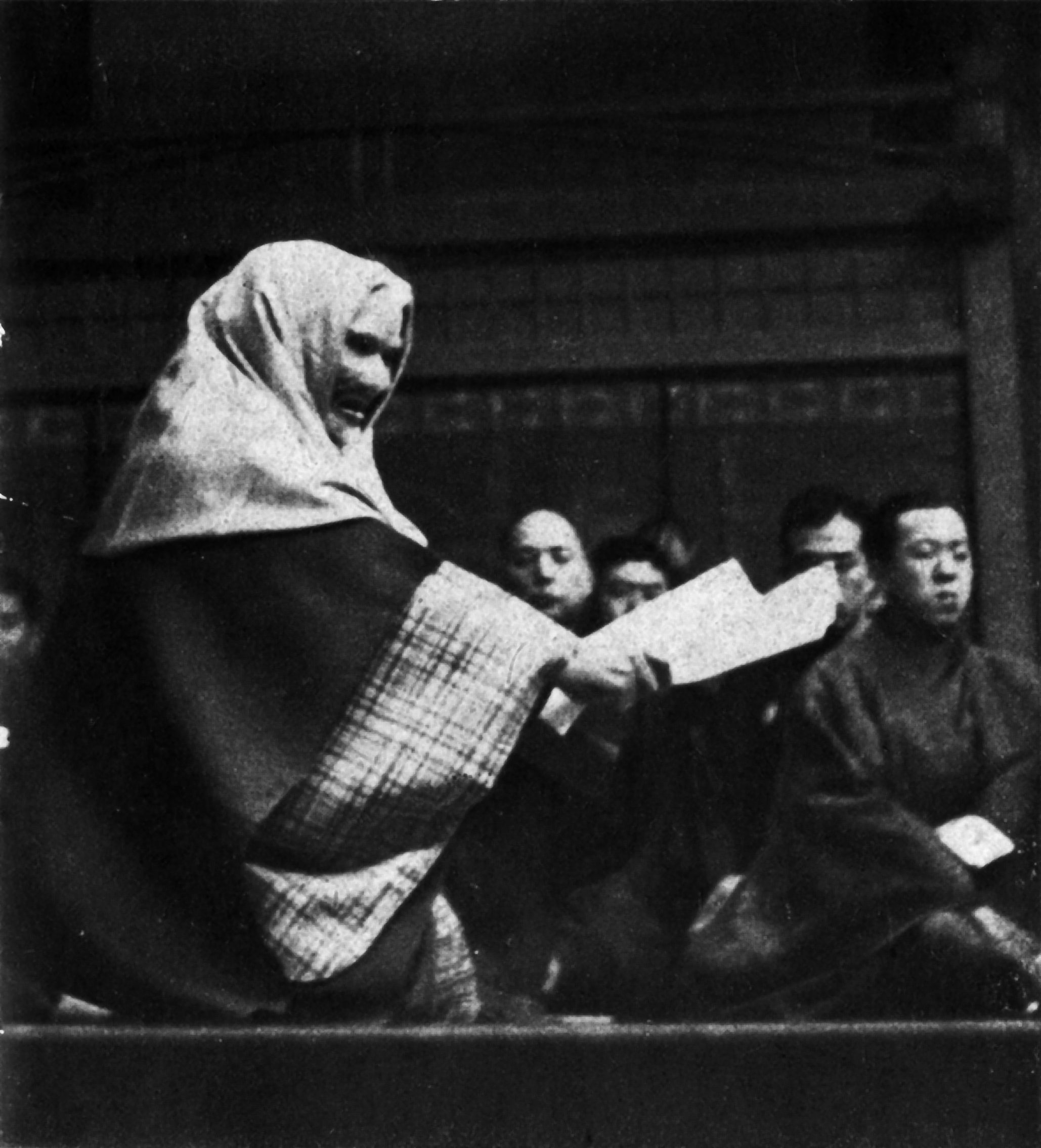
Shunkan, NOGUCHI Kanesuke(野口兼資)

Shunkan (俊寛) is a Noh play, which was traditionally attributed to Zeami, but is now ascribed either to his son-in-law Zenchiku or his son Motomasa.

The Kita school refers to this play as Kikaigashima.

== Background ==
The play takes place in the aftermath of the Shishigatani Incident, several years before the final defeat of the Taira and the ascendancy of the Minamoto clan in the Genpei War of 1180-1185. It focuses upon the fate of a trio exiled to "Devil's Island" (Kikaigashima, 鬼界島), off the coast of Satsuma province, as punishment for a plot against the ruling Taira clan.

When the imperial consort, pregnant with Antoku, the future emperor, falls ill, seers advise Taira no Kiyomori, the de facto head of government, to placate the spirits by pardoning and compensating some of his victims. He agrees to pardon Fujiwara no Naritsune and Taira no Yasuyori, but not the monk Shunkan.

== Plot summary ==
The play begins with the dispatch of an envoy to the island, where Naritsune and Yasuyori (but not the Zen Buddhist Shunkan) are ceremoniously worshipping their replica of the Kumano shrine, while the Chorus laments the “endless days of banishment”.

When the (prop) boat brings the amnesty proclamation, Shunkan is staggered to find his name is not on it: “When three dwelt together here, How terrible the loneliness of these wild rocks! Now one is left, to wither Like a flower dropped on the shore”.

The play reaches its emotional climax when he clutches the rope behind the departing boat, in vain; and he is left alone, with only the voices of his former companions assuring him that they will work for his recall as well.

== See also ==
- Heike monogatari - classical epic relating the events on which this and many other works have been derived.
- Atsumori - another Noh play set at the same time.
- Philoctetes
