= Fujiwara no Naritsune =

Exiled Japanese noble

Fujiwara no Naritsune (藤原 成経; d. 1202) was a Japanese courtier of the Heian period who, after plotting against the Taira clan, was exiled along with his father, Fujiwara no Narichika, and several other co-conspirators to Kikai-ga-shima. He and his companions in exile, Taira no Yasunori and the monk Shunkan, feature prominently in a number of traditional Japanese dramas, including the Noh play Shunkan and the jōruri puppet play Heike Nyogo-ga-shima which was later adapted for kabuki as well.

The lord of Tanba province, Naritsune was married to a niece of Taira no Kiyomori, chief minister in the Imperial government. He features prominently in the early chapters of the Heike Monogatari as it relates the tale of the plot and subsequent exile. According to that text, shortly after his father was exiled to Kikai-ga-shima, Naritsune was, in the sixth lunar month of 1177, summoned to Fukuhara and then to Bitchū province before himself being sent to Kikai-ga-shima.

During his time on the island, Naritsune, along with Yasuyori, became a fervent adherent of the Kumano faith, regularly performing rituals and prayers for the kami of the Kumano Shrines. Some months after their banishment, Empress Tokuko suffered an illness which was blamed on the angry spirit of the late Narichika. To appease the spirit and restore the health of the Empress, Naritsune and Yasuyori were pardoned. News reached them near the end of the ninth lunar month of 1178. After visiting his father's grave, Naritsune returned to Kyoto in the third month of the following year. He was then reunited with his young son, who had been roughly three years old (by Japanese traditional reckoning), and another child, who had yet to be born when he was exiled. Reinstated into the service of the Retired Emperor Go-Shirakawa, he regained his rank, and would later be promoted.
