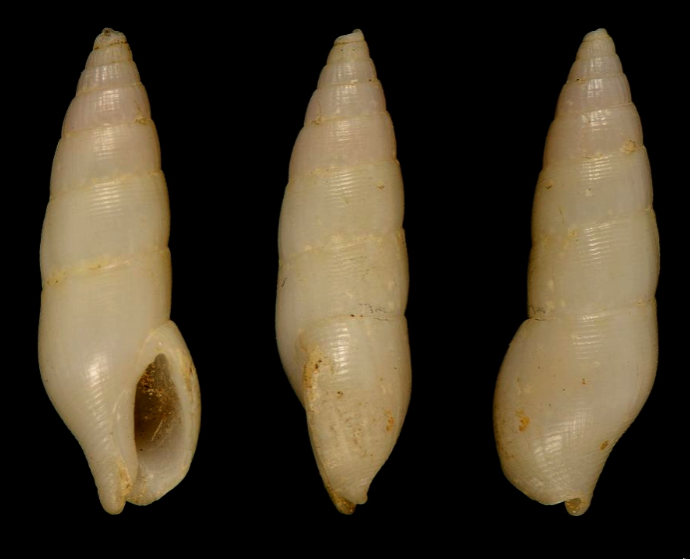
- Shell of Drillia eborea (specimen at the Smithsonian Institution)

Scientific classification
- Kingdom: Animalia
- Phylum: Mollusca
- Class: Gastropoda
- Subclass: Caenogastropoda
- Order: Neogastropoda
- Superfamily: Conoidea
- Family: Drilliidae
- Genus: Drillia
- Species: D. eborea

Binomial name
- Drillia eborea Gould A.A., 1860

= Drillia eborea =

Species of gastropod

Drillia eborea is a species of sea snail, a marine gastropod mollusk in the family Drilliidae.

This is a taxon inquirendum.

== Description ==
The length of this shell attains 12 mm; its diameter 4 mm.

The small, solid, lanceolate shell is yellowish white. It is everywhere densely and faintly grooved by transverse lines, most so near the sutures. The apical whorls are longitudinally folded. The shell contains 8 whorls. The aperture is narrow, lunate and placed somewhat laterally. The outer lip is thick, simple, with a slight sinus near its posterior junction. The columella has a thick, erect callus, quite thick posteriorly. The rostrum is reflexed.

== Distribution ==
This marine species occurs off Kikaia Island, Japan.
