= Taira no Tokinobu =

- 平時信

Personal details
- Died: 1149
- Spouse: Fujiwara no Sukeko
- Children: Taira no Tokiko; Taira no Tokitada; Taira no Shigeko
- Parent: Taira no Tomonobu (father)

Taira no Tokinobu (平時信; d. 1149) was a court noble and member of the Taira clan. He was the son of Taira no Tomonobu and the grandfather of Emperor Takakura. He held various civil and military posts and was also governor of the provinces of Kai and Iyo.

In 1147, his daughter Tokiko became the second wife of Taira no Kiyomori. In March of the same year, Tokinobu's residence, located near Gojo Kyogoku where the retainers of the Emperor and Empress resided, was destroyed by fire. In February 1148, he was dispatched to the Gion Shrine to prepare for the Hokke Hakkō (eight lectures on the Lotus Sutra) as a token of gratitude for the Gion disturbance that had occurred the previous year, which had been triggered by the actions of his son-in-law, Kiyomori. He died on July 26, 1149.

His daughter Shigeko became a favorite concubine of Emperor Go-Shirakawa after Tokinobu's death and gave birth to Prince Norihito in 1161. In 1168, upon Norihito's accession to the throne as Emperor Takakura, Tokinobu was posthumously granted the titles of Minister of the Left and Senior First Rank as the emperor's maternal grandfather.

== Cultural references ==
Tokinobu is a major character in Kenji Mizoguchi's 1955 movie Shin Heike Monogatari.
