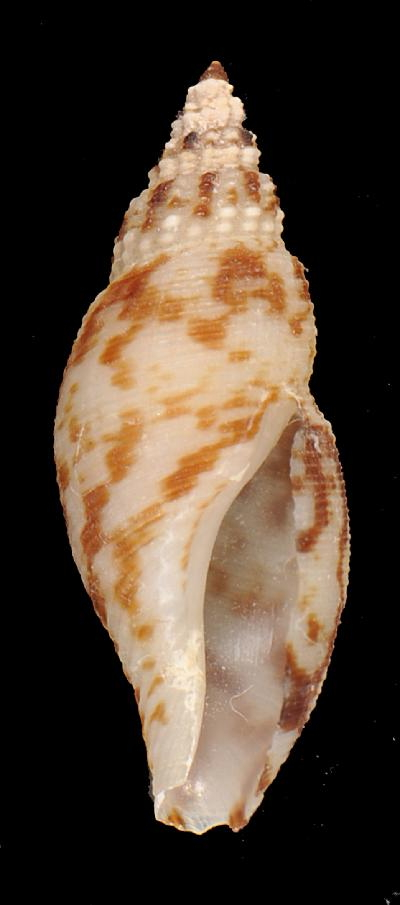
- Shell of Daphnella lymneiformis (specimen at MNHN, Paris)

Scientific classification
- Kingdom: Animalia
- Phylum: Mollusca
- Class: Gastropoda
- Subclass: Caenogastropoda
- Order: Neogastropoda
- Superfamily: Conoidea
- Family: Raphitomidae
- Genus: Daphnella
- Species: D. lymneiformis

Binomial name
- Daphnella lymneiformis (Kiener, 1840)

Synonyms
- Daphnella barbadensis Nowell-Usticke, 1971; Daphnella decorata Adams, 1850; Daphnella (Daphnella) lymneiformis (Kiener, 1840)· accepted, alternate representation; Pleurotoma decorata C. B. Adams, 1850; Pleurotoma lymneiformis Kiener, 1840 (original combination)

= Daphnella lymneiformis =

Species of gastropod

Daphnella lymneiformis, common name the volute turret, is a species of very small sea snail, a marine gastropod mollusk in the family Raphitomidae.

== Description ==
The length of the shell varies between 8 mm and 20 mm.

The whorls show narrow, close, revolving ridges, the earlier ones with longitudinal ribs. The color of the shell is white, irregularly maculated with chestnut, often forming longitudinal zigzag markings.

== Distribution ==
D. lymneiformis can be found in Atlantic and Caribbean waters, ranging from the eastern coast of Florida to Brazil. Fossils have been found in Quaternary strata at Kikai Island, Japan; age range: 0.126 to 0.012 Ma
