= Shinsarugakuki =

Shinsarugakuki (新猿楽記; also pronounced Shinsarugōki, An Account of the New Monkey Music, or A Record of New Sarugaku) is an 11th-century Japanese work of fiction written by Fujiwara no Akihira (989–1066). The work consists of an introduction and twenty-eight short chapters and portrays a sarugaku performance took place in Kyoto and the family of a military official Uemon-no-jō in the audience. While describing the performance in the introduction and the members of Uemon-no-jō's family, namely his three wives, sixteen daughters and/or their husbands, and nine sons, in the following chapters, the narrative incorporates various words related to performing arts and the respective occupation of the figures and thus provides the readers with lists of objects. For example, the book provides in the introduction an account of various performances, including comic sketches, lion dances, puppets, rice-planting songs, and solo sumo wrestling. As a result, Shinsarugakuki is considered to be one of the most important sources relating the lives and society of the time.

== Ideal farmer ==
The husband of Uemon-no-jō's third daughter Tanaka no Toyomasu is a farmer and therefore the narrator describes the life of an idealistic landholding farmer in the chapter. Toyomasu is described as daimyo-tato, a farmer with land holdings. He meticulously tills his lands at the right time, with his own agricultural implements of Chinese origin. He has skills to mend them as required and has an excellent reputation with people who work with him on his fields. He pays for additional work to restore the embankment ditches and paths along the rice fields. He ensures the sowing season for late crops of rice, as well as glutinous rice. The farmer is also present during the planting of all other crops, such as barley, wheat, soy bean, cowpea, millet, buckwheat and sesame in the regular season, assuring that they are all strictly observed, and that the workers, both men and women, who help him in this planning process, are duly rewarded. He does not believe in the wasting of sowing grains. His return at the end of harvest and pounding is always several fold more (exaggerates it as “ten thousand times more”).

== Trading of goods ==
The eighth son Hachirō-mauto is a trader and in his description, the author gives an account of both domestic and international trades, revealing an insight into trade in East Asia at the time. Hachirō-mauto is supposed to have traveled to the land of the Emishi in the east and to Kikai Island in the west. The items listed as the goods he imports (karamono) include perfumes, medicines, animal hides, dyes, brocades, and nuts from Korea, China, South Asia, South East Asia, and Central Asia. In more detail, they are "spices and fragrances such as Aloeswood (agalloch, Garro/Gharo), musk, cloves, sandalwood oil, frankincense (or retinite), birthwort root, borneol, camphor; precious woods such as sandalwood, sanderswood, Bischofia and sappanwood; medicines such as Alum, elixir of gold, elixir of silver, croton oil, orpiment, myrobalans, betel (areca nuts); pigments such as gamboge, indigo, lac, verdigris, azurite, minium, cinnabar and ceruse; textiles such as twill, brocade, scarlet raiment, "elephant eye" damask, soft Koryo brocade, Tonkin brocade, silk gauze and crape; other items such as leopard and tiger skins, rattan, teacups, wicker baskets, rhinoceros horns, water buffalo (horn) scepters, agate belts, glass urns, Chinese bamboo, sweet bamboo, and hollow glass balls." Except for minerals, the other goods generally originated from forests of South and Southeast Asia transported by ship to East Asia; mineral products were, however, from Central Asia. For the pan-European network of exchange, Japan was the terminus.
