= Princess Ryōshi =

Princess Ryōshi 亮子内親王
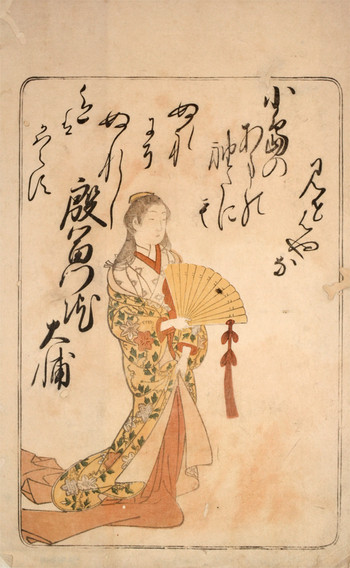

Honorary empress consort of Japan
- Reign: 13 September 1182 – 4 August 1187
- Born: 1147
- Died: 27 April 1216 (aged 68–69); Heian-kyō (Kyōto)
- House: Imperial House of Japan
- Father: Emperor Go-Shirakawa
- Mother: Taira no Shigeko

Princess Ryōshi (亮子内親王, Ryōshi Naishin'nō; 1147 – 27 April 1216), later Empress Emerita Inpumon'in (殷富門院), was an honorary empress consort of Japan during the late Heian period. Ryōshi was empress as the honorary mother (准母, junbo) of her nephews Emperor Antoku and Emperor Go-Toba.

== Biography ==
She was the daughter of Emperor Go-Shirakawa and Empress Dowager (皇太后, kōtaigō) Taira no Shigeko (later Kenshunmon'in (建春門院), and the sister of Emperor Takakura. She was appointed Honorary Mother to her nephews, who reigned in succession as Emperor Antoku and Emperor Go-Toba. As their honorary mother, she was made Honorary Empress and performed the court functions of an empress consort during their reign.

== Notes ==
Japanese royalty
Preceded by Taira no Tokuko	Empress consort of Japan (hornoary); 1182–1187	Succeeded by Fujiwara no Ninshi
