= Fujiwara no Narichika =

Japanese noble (1138 - 1178)

- 藤原 成親
- Born: 1138
- Died: 1178 (aged 39–40)
- Children: Fujiwara no Naritsune (son)
- Father: Fujiwara no Ienari

Fujiwara no Narichika (藤原 成親) (1138–1178) was a Japanese court noble who took part in a plot against the Taira clan's dominance of the Imperial court.

Narichika was the son of Fujiwara no Ienari. For his role in the Shishigatani Incident in 1177, he was exiled, along with his son Fujiwara no Naritsune, Taira no Yasuyori, and the monk Shunkan to Kikai-ga-shima island in the far south of Japan. Narichika was later executed by the order of the Taira.

It is known that he was one of Fujiwara no Yorinaga's many male lovers.
