= Taira no Tokiko =

Japanese noble (1126-1185)

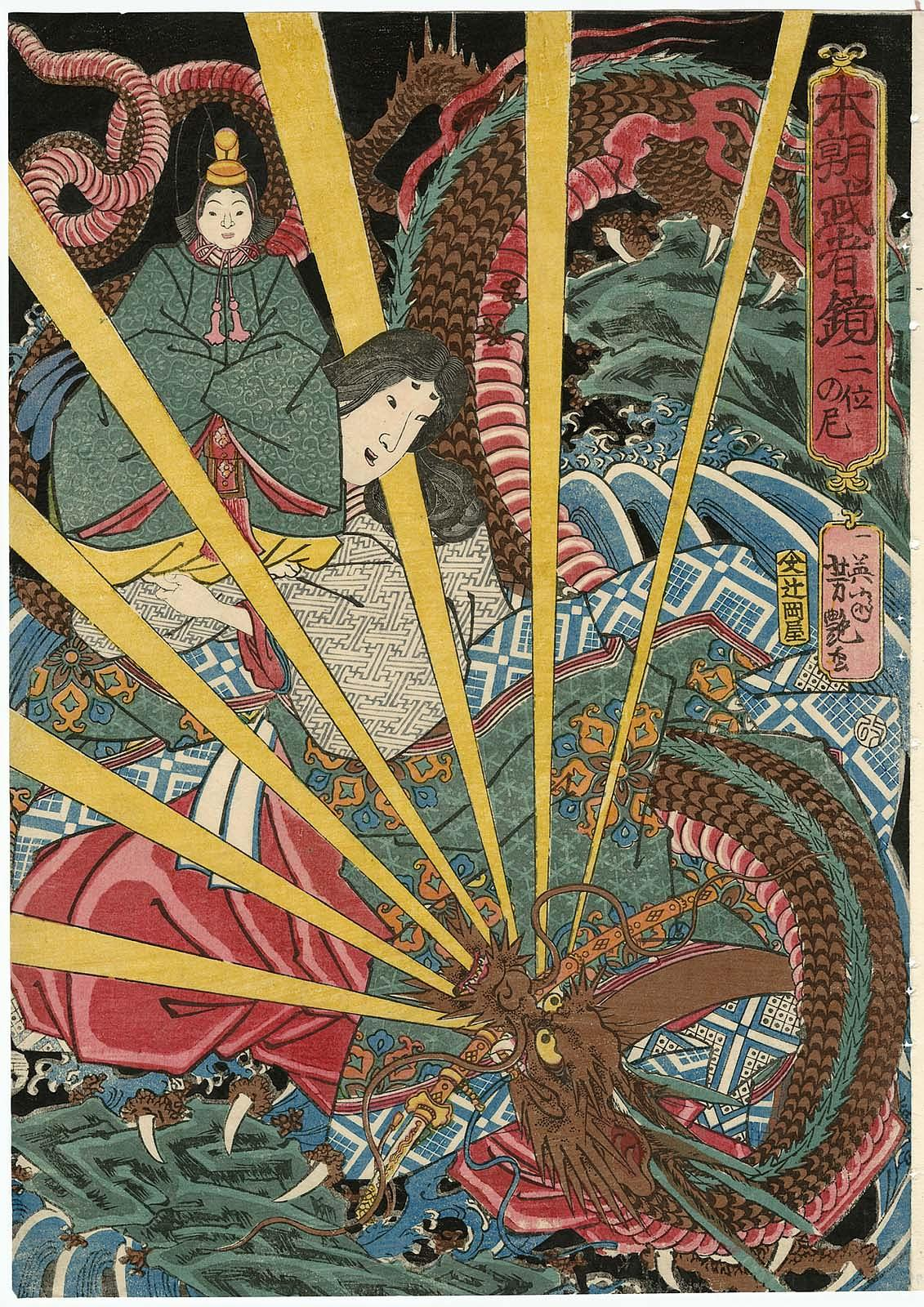
Nii no Ama rescuing her grandson, Emperor Antoku from a dragon, in a print by Yoshitsuya Ichieisai.

Taira no Tokiko (平 時子; 1126–1185) was a Japanese aristocrat from the Heian period. She was the daughter of Taira no Tokinobu, concubine of Taira no Kiyomori, mother of Taira no Tokuko, and grandmother of Emperor Antoku. Later she took the vows to become a nun, after which she was generally referred to by her Buddhist name as the "Nun of the Second Rank" (二位尼, Nii no Ama).

After Kiyomori's death in 1181, Tokiko's son, Taira no Munemori, became the head of the Taira clan. After this, she became the representative pillar of the Taira clan. According to The Tale of the Heike, Taira no Tokiko drowned herself during the Battle of Dan-no-ura together with her grandson, Emperor Antoku.

== Life ==
It is speculated that she was taken as Kiyomori's concubine around the year 1145, based on the birth year of her first child, Munemori. After the Heiji Rebellion, she became the wet nurse of Emperor Nijō's son, and on December 24, 1160, she was promoted to Jusanmi by the recommendation of Yaso no Tsubone. Her role as the wet nurse of Emperor Nijō and Kiyomori's status as the foster father were seen as a gesture of allegiance to Emperor Nijō and a demonstration of political service during the conflict between Emperor Nijō and the retired Emperor Go-Shirakawa.

After the death of Emperor Nijō, she and her half-sister Shigeko, who became a favored concubine of Go-Shirakawa, mediated the political alliance between Kiyomori and Go-Shirakawa, and when Prince Norihito (later Emperor Takakura) was appointed Crown Prince on October 10, 1166, she was promoted to Jūni-i on October 21 of the same year.

In 1168, she and Kiyomori both retired from secular life. After Kiyomori moved to Fukuhara, she inherited the residence at Nishi-Hachijō and renamed it Hachijō Kurashiki-tei. In 1171, when Tokuko entered the court as Empress to Emperor Takakura, she played a significant role in the childbirth of Empress Tokuko and in the ceremonies for the births and upbringing of the imperial princes and princesses, deepening the relationship between the Taira clan and the imperial family.

After the political upheaval of the Genpei War in 1180, when the grandson of Tokuko, Emperor Antoku, ascended the throne, she and Kiyomori were granted the title of Junsanmi. As Kiyomori showed a strong intention to make Munemori his successor in his later years, the Komatsu branch of the Taira clan, descendants of Taira no Shigehira, was excluded from the main line, and Tokiko's lineage became the new main line.

After Kiyomori's death, Tokiko, along with her son Munemori and her daughter Tokuko, who was the mother of Emperor Takakura, became the central figure of the Taira clan, playing a crucial role as the spiritual pillar of the clan. When the Taira clan suffered final defeat against the Minamoto forces at the Battle of Dannoura, she whispered to Emperor Antoku, "The capital lies beneath the waves," and then embraced the young emperor and plunged into the sea, committing suicide. She was 60 years old at the time.

According to the "Gukanshō," Tokiko was said to have carried the sword Ame no Murakumo no Tsurugi, one of the Three Sacred Treasures, and Emperor Antoku was said to have carried the jewel while being submerged. The emperor was rescued afterward. Also, according to the "Azumakagami," Tokiko was said to have embraced Emperor Antoku and submerged herself while carrying both Ame no Murakumo no Tsurugi and another of the Three Sacred Treasures, the Yasakani no Magatama.

== Grave and Legacy ==
Her grave is located at Akama Shrine, where every year on May 2, a memorial service is held by the descendants of the Taira clan organized as the National Taira Clan Association. Additionally, in Hikiji, Nagato City, Yamaguchi Prefecture, there is a beach called "Nii-no-hama," named after the tradition that her body washed ashore there. It is a popular beach destination.

== Honours ==
- Japanese Court Upper Rank: Junior Second Rank (従二位)

== See also ==
- List of female castellans in Japan
