= Shishigatani incident =

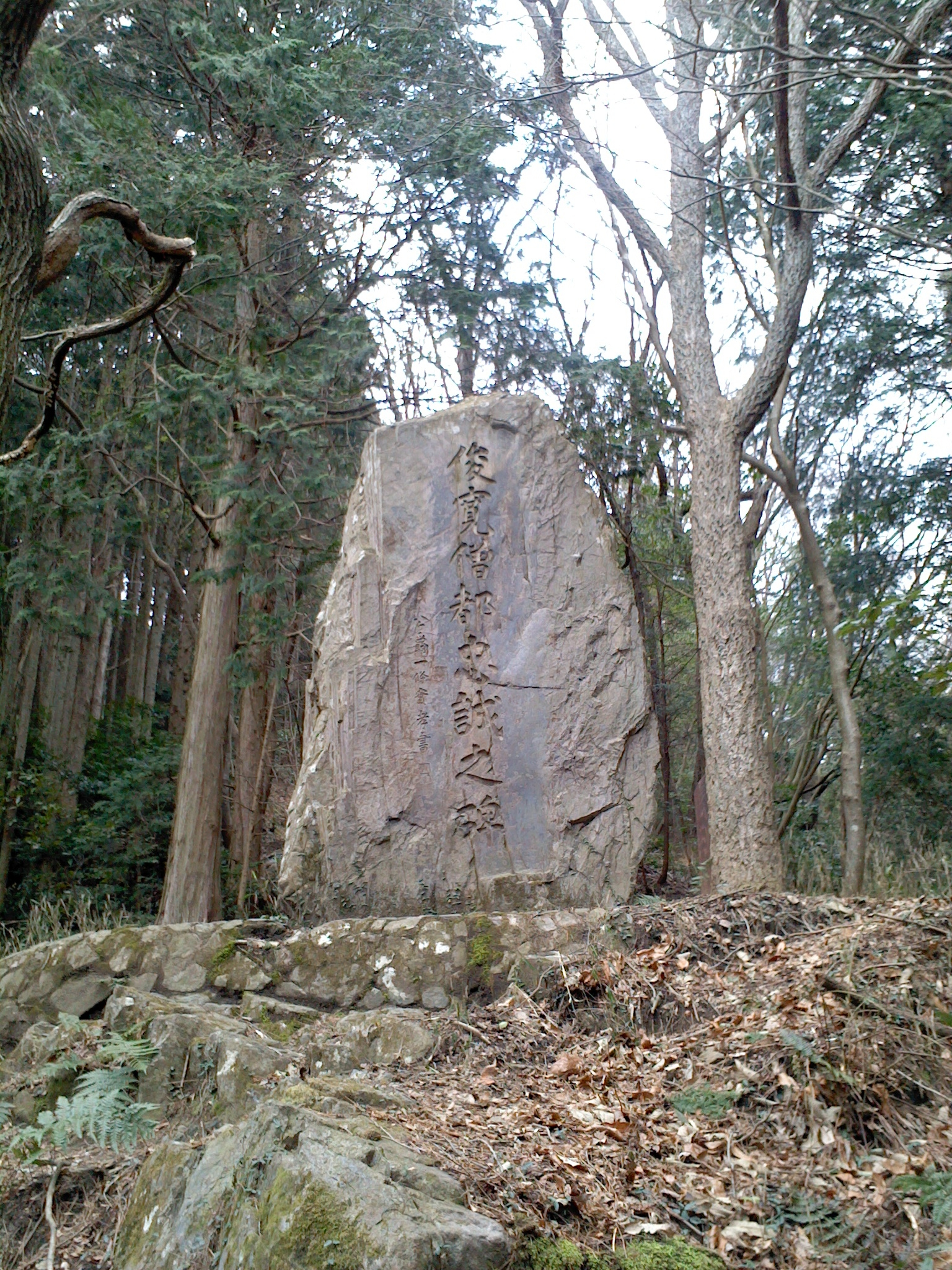
Daimonji shunkan

The Shishigatani incident (鹿ケ谷事件, Shishigatani jiken, 鹿ヶ谷の陰謀, Shishigatani no inbou) of June 1177 was a failed uprising against the rule of Taira no Kiyomori in Japan. The conspiracy was discovered, and its perpetrators arrested and punished before any part of their plan was put into action.

The incident is also known in Japanese as Shishigatani no Inbō (鹿ケ谷の陰謀), the Shishigatani Conspiracy or Plot. The name comes from the location where the conspirators met, a mountain villa belonging to Jōken Hōin, in the Shishi Valley (Shishigatani) in the Higashiyama area of Kyoto.

== Background ==
This is the most famous of a number of conspiracies and uprisings against Kiyomori. He rose quickly to power in the 1160s and dominated rather than guided the Imperial Court, taking advantage of his position to install members of his own family into high court positions, and marrying them into the Imperial family. In a number of ways, and on a number of occasions, he offended and opposed the cloistered Emperor Go-Shirakawa and the Fujiwara family of court nobles and regents.

== Incident ==
Fujiwara no Narichika, his son Fujiwara no Naritsune, Saikō (the religious name of Fujiwara no Moromitsu), Taira no Yasuyori (Hei-Hogan, or Taira police lieutenant), Tada no Kurando Yukitsuna (a Genji from Settsu province), and the monk Shunkan gathered, along with others, in a small country villa in Shishigatani, to conspire against Kiyomori and the Taira clan as a whole.

However, Tada Yukitsuna was a spy for Kiyomori, and reported the conspiracy to his lord. Saikō, a monk, was tortured and then executed, angering monastic groups already opposed to his considerable secular authority. Kiyomori then rebuked Emperor Go-Shirakawa, who had been aware of the plot, seized a number of mansions belonging to the Fujiwara, and dismissed a number of officials from office, including Regent Fujiwara no Motofusa. He then filled the vacated Court positions with members of his own family. Shunkan, Yasuyori, and Naritsune were exiled to a remote island south of Kyūshū called "Kikai Island", which has been identified with at least three different islands.

== Cultural references ==
The events, and their consequences, are related in the classical epic Heike monogatari, and in a number of derivative works such as the Noh play Shunkan and the jōruri (puppet theater) production Heike Nyogo-ga-Shima which concern themselves with the exiles on Kikai-ga-shima.
