= Fukuhara =

Fukuhara (written: 福原) is a Japanese surname meaning "field of fortune", "field of blessings", or "lucky field". Alternate transliterations include Fukubara and Fukuwara. Notable people with the surname include:

- Aaron Fukuhara (born 1991), American judoka
- Ai Fukuhara (福原 愛; born 1988), Japanese table tennis player
- Arinobu Fukuhara (福原 有信; 1848–1924), Japanese pharmacist and businessman
- Ayaka Fukuhara (福原 綾香; born 1989), Japanese voice actress
- Harry K. Fukuhara (1920–2015), United States Army soldier
- Haruka Fukuhara (福原 遥; born 1998), Japanese actress, voice actress and singer
- Henry Fukuhara (1913–2010), American watercolorist
- Fukubara Hirotoshi (福原 広俊; 1512? – 1593), Japanese samurai
- Hirotsugu Fukuhara (福原 広次; born 1945), Japanese cyclist
- Kaori Fukuhara (福原 香織; born 1986), Japanese voice actress
- Karen Fukuhara (born 1992), American actress
- Miho Fukuhara (福原 美穂; born 1987), Japanese singer
- Miwa Fukuhara (福原 美和; born 1944), Japanese figure skater
- Reizo Fukuhara (福原 黎三; 1931–1970), Japanese footballer
- Rosō Fukuhara (福原 路草; 1892–1946), Japanese photographer
- Shinobu Fukuhara (福原 忍; born 1976), Japanese baseball player
- Shinzō Fukuhara (福原 信三; 1883–1948), Japanese photographer
- Tatsuya Fukuhara (福原 辰弥; born 1989), Japanese boxer
- Yoshiharu Fukuhara (福原 吉春; 1942–1975), Japanese alpine skier

== Fictional characters ==
- Shin Fukuhara (福原 慎), a character in the light novel series Baka and Test

== See also ==
- Fukuhara-kyō, one time seat of the Japanese Imperial Court
- Fukuhara Station, a railway station in Kasama, Ibaraki Prefecture, Japan
- 8043 Fukuhara, a main-belt asteroid
