= Taira no Tokuko =

Empress of Japan from 1172 to 1182

Taira no Tokuko 平徳子
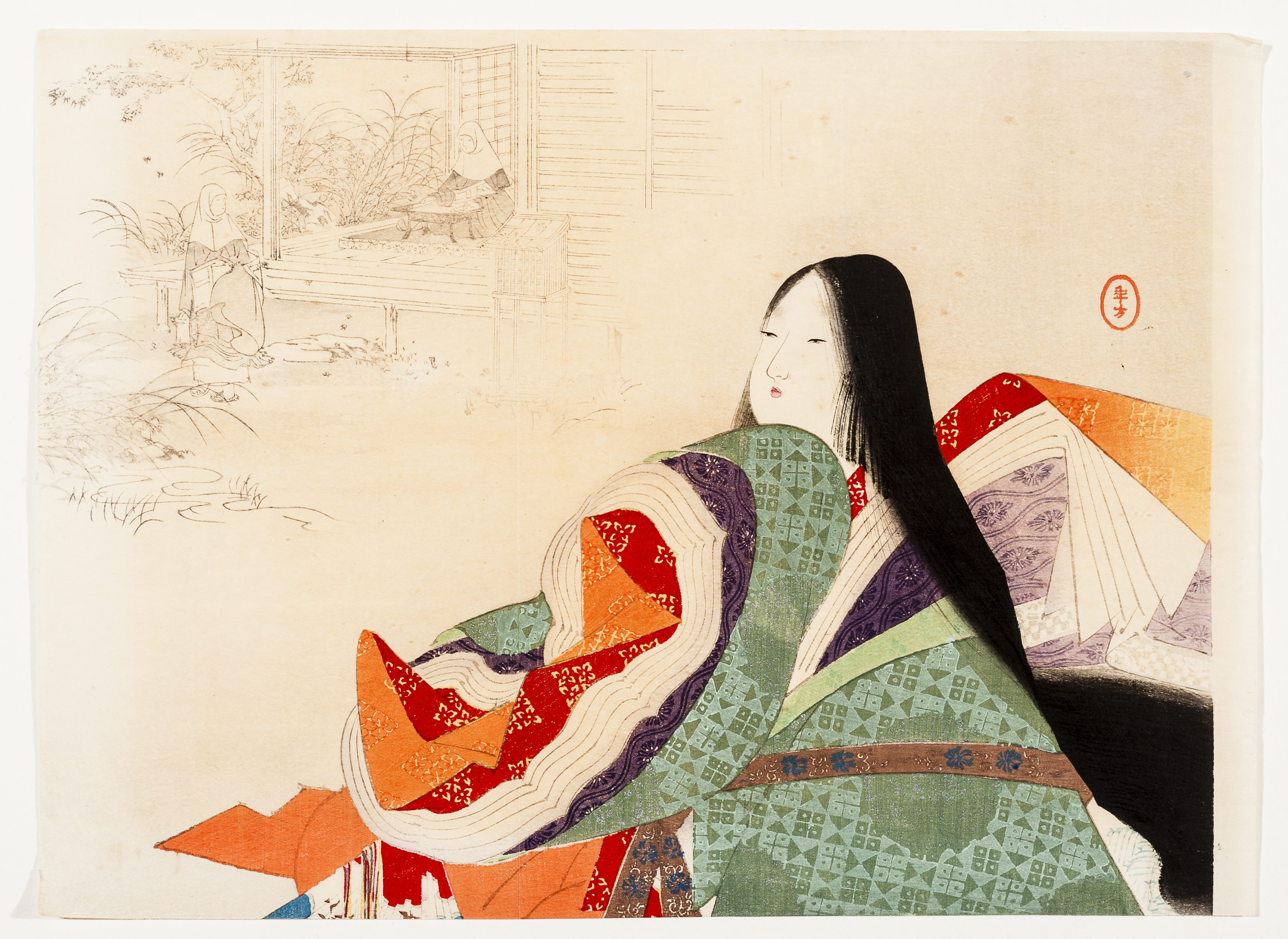

Empress consort of Japan
- Tenure: March 6, 1172 – January 1, 1182
- Born: 1155
- Died: January 25, 1214 (aged 58–59) (Note: Tokuko died sometime between 1191-1214. The dates of her death vary with the Tale of the Heike intimates book giving the year Kenkyu 2 (1191). However this cannot be verified and in reality it is unknown.); Heian-kyō (Kyōto)
- Spouse: Emperor Takakura (m. 1172; died 1181)
- Issue: Emperor Antoku
- House: Imperial House of Japan
- Father: Taira no Kiyomori
- Mother: Taira no Tokiko

Taira no Tokuko (Taira no Tokushi) (平 徳子; 1155 – January 25, 1214), later known as Kenreimon-in (建礼門院), was the daughter of Taira no Kiyomori and Taira no Tokiko. She was empress consort of Emperor Takakura.

Tokuko was also the last Imperial survivor from the great naval battle of Dan-no-ura.

Her life became a compelling narrative which survives as both history and literature.

== In history ==
=== Daughter of an emperor ===
Tokuko became the adopted daughter of Emperor Go-Shirakawa (後白河天皇,, Go-Shirakawa-tennō), the 77th emperor of Japan who reigned from 1155 through 1158. In 1171, when Tokuko was 17, the emperor had abdicated the throne and entered the Buddhist priesthood, taking the Buddhist name of Gyōshin.

=== Consort of an emperor ===
In 1172, Tokuko was married to Go-Shirakawa's fourth and only surviving son, Emperor Takakura. Takakura was also her first cousin as both their mothers were half-sisters. The wedding was an arranged one, as to cement the alliance between the two co-fathers-in-law; Go-Shirakawa sponsored Kiyomori's rise as Chancellor of the Realm, while Kiyomori provided military and financial support to Go-Shirakawa.

Tokuko and Takakura's son, Prince Tokihito, was born in 1178. Just a year later, Kiyomori launched a coup d'état, sacking his political rivals from their posts, banishing them, and replacing them with his allies and clansmen. He even had Go-Shirakawa imprisoned; at this point they had fallen out of their political alliance.

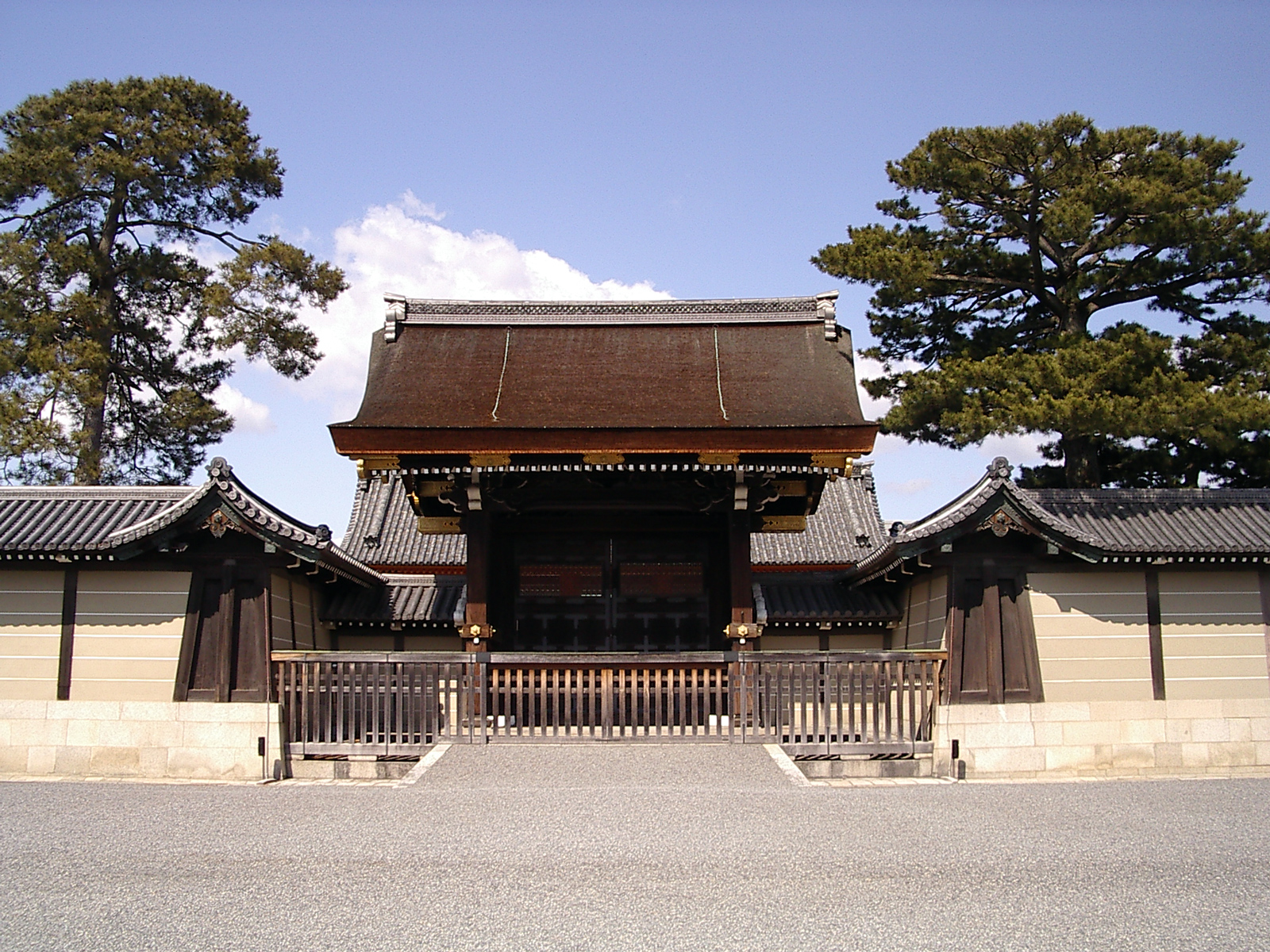
The Kenrei-mon (建礼門), one of the entrance gates to Kyoto Imperial Palace

In 1180, Emperor Takakura was forced to abdicate by Kiyomori; Prince Tokihito ascended the throne as Emperor Antoku. Now an empress dowager, Tokuko received the name Kenrei-mon In. In this period, the names of the several gates in the walls surrounding the imperial grounds refer not only to the wall-openings themselves; these names were also used to refer indirectly to a nearby residence of an empress whose husband had abdicated, or as an indirect way of referring to an empress dowager herself. For example, Kenrei-mon In (建礼門院), whose official home, after the abdication and death of Emperor Takakura, was located near the Kenrei Gate.

=== Mother of an emperor ===
Tokuko, now Kenrei-mon In, was mother to Emperor Antoku. The child emperor reigned from 1180 through 1185.

=== Survivor of Dan-no-ura ===
Arguably, the most difficult moments in Kenreimon-In's life occurred near the close of the battle of Dan-no-ura, which took place near the southern tip of Honshū in Shimonoseki, Yamaguchi.

- Genryaku 2, on the 24th day of the 3rd month (April 25, 1185): The Taira and the Minamoto clashed for the last time.

The Taira were defeated decisively. Many of the Taira samurai threw themselves into the waves rather than live to see their clan's ultimate defeat at the hands of the Minamoto. Antoku's grandmother, Taira no Tokiko, Kiyomori's widow, leapt into the water with the young emperor clasped firmly in her arms.

Kenrei-mon In also tried to drown herself; but according to the conventionally accepted accounts, she was pulled out with a rake by her long hair.

=== Buddhist nun ===
This sometime daughter, wife, and mother of emperors became a recluse in her later years.

- Bunji 1, on the 1st day of the 5th month (1185): Kenrei-mon In took the tonsure at Chōraku-ji, a branch temple of Enryaku-ji on Higashiyama.
- Bunji 1, on the 30th day of the 9th month (1185): Kenrei-mon In retreated further from the world when she moved to Jakkō-in, a Buddhist nunnery near the village of Ōhara, northeast of the Heian-kyō....Click for link to photos of Jakkō-in and Ōhara
- Bunji 2, on the 20th day of the 4th month (1186): Gyōshin, the cloistered former-Emperor Go-Shirakawa, visited Kenrei-mon In at her rural retreat in Ōhara.
- Kenkyū 2, in the 2nd month (1192): Kenrei-mon In dies in Ōhara.

This once-pampered great lady is said to have composed this poem in her hermit's hut:

Did I ever dream
That I would behold the moon
Here on the mountain --
The moon that I used to view
In the sky o'er the palace?

== In literature ==
Many stories and works of art depict this period in Japanese history, and it is through these sources that the life of Taira no Tokuko is best known. The Tale of the Heike is the most famous of the sources from which we learn about this historical character, although many kabuki and bunraku plays reproduce events of the war as well.

The central theme of the Heike story—and the mirrored theme of Taira no Tokuko's life story—is a demonstration of the Buddhist law of impermanence. The theme of impermanence (mujō) is captured in the opening passage:

The sound of the Gion Shōja bells echoes the impermanence of all things; the color of the sāla flowers reveals the truth that the prosperous must decline. The proud do not endure, they are like a dream on a spring night; the mighty fall at last, they are as dust before the wind.

In this and other classic Japanese tales, the central figures are popularly well known, the major events are generally understood, and the stakes as they were understood at the time are conventionally accepted as elements in the foundation of Japanese culture. The accuracy of each of these historical records has become a compelling subject for further study; and some accounts have been shown to withstand close scrutiny, while other presumed “facts” have turned out to be inaccurate.

In English-language literature, Tokuko's life and reign are depicted throughout the two-volume historical fiction narrative, White as Bone, Red as Blood, by Cerridwen Fallingstar, published in 2009 and 2011, respectively.

== Notes ==
Japanese royalty
Preceded by Fujiwara no Ikushi	Empress consort of Japan; 1172–1182	Succeeded by Princess Sukeko
