= Emperor Go-Shirakawa =

Emperor of Japan from 1155 to 1158

Emperor Go-Shirakawa 後白河天皇
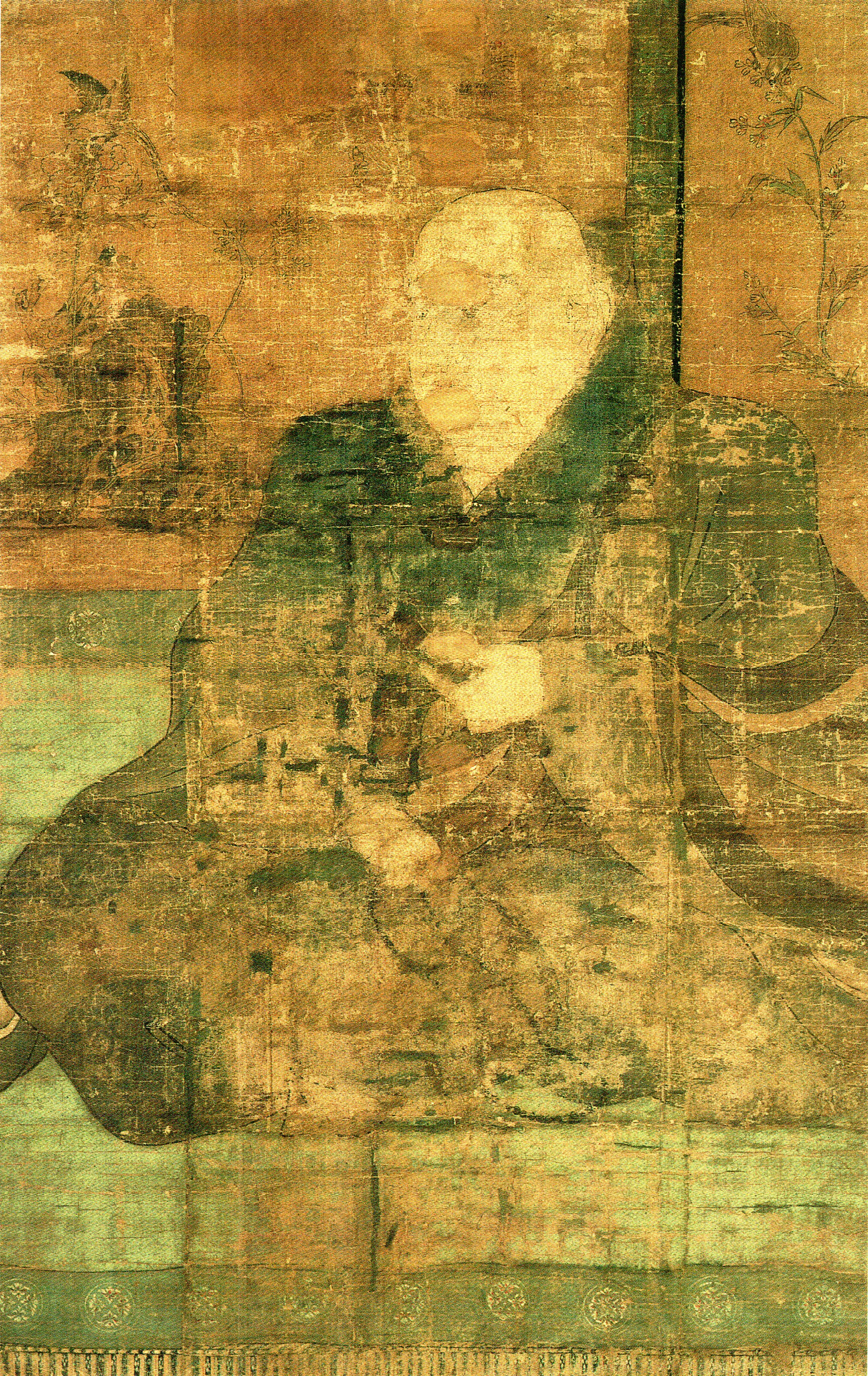
- Portrait from the "Yamato-e: Traditions of Beauty from the Imperial Court"

Emperor of Japan
- Reign: August 23, 1155 – September 5, 1158
- Enthronement: November 22, 1155
- Predecessor: Konoe
- Successor: Nijō
- Born: October 18, 1127
- Died: April 26, 1192 (aged 64); Rokujō-den (六条殿), Heian-kyō
- Burial: Hōjū-ji no Misasagi (Kyoto)
- Spouse: Fujiwara no Kinshi (m. 1155)
- Issue more...: Emperor Nijō; Princess Sukeko; Princess Shikishi; Prince Mochihito; Emperor Takakura
Posthumous name
- Tsuigō: Emperor Go-Shirakawa (後白河院 or 後白河天皇)
- House: Imperial House of Japan
- Father: Emperor Toba
- Mother: Fujiwara no Tamako

Emperor Go-Shirakawa (後白河天皇, Go-Shirakawa-tennō; October 18, 1127 – April 26, 1192) was the 77th emperor of Japan, according to the traditional order of succession. His de jure reign spanned the years from 1155 through 1158, though arguably he effectively maintained imperial power for almost thirty-seven years through the insei system – scholars differ as to whether his rule can be truly considered part of the insei system, given that the Hōgen Rebellion undermined the imperial position. However, it is broadly acknowledged that by politically outmaneuvering his opponents, he attained greater influence and power than the diminished authority of the emperor's position during this period would otherwise allow.

Posthumously, this 12th-century sovereign was named after the 11th-century Emperor Shirakawa. Go- (後), translates literally as "later"; and thus, he is sometimes called the "Later Emperor Shirakawa", or in some older sources, may be identified as "Shirakawa, the second" or as "Shirakawa II".

Unusually, the years of Go-Shirakawa's reign are more specifically identified by more than one era name or nengō; Kyūju (1154–1156) and Hōgen (1156–1159).

He was de facto the last true emperor, before the shogun became the actual head of the country after Go-Shirakawa's death in 1192 until the Meiji Restoration in 1868.

== Political career ==
=== Accession ===
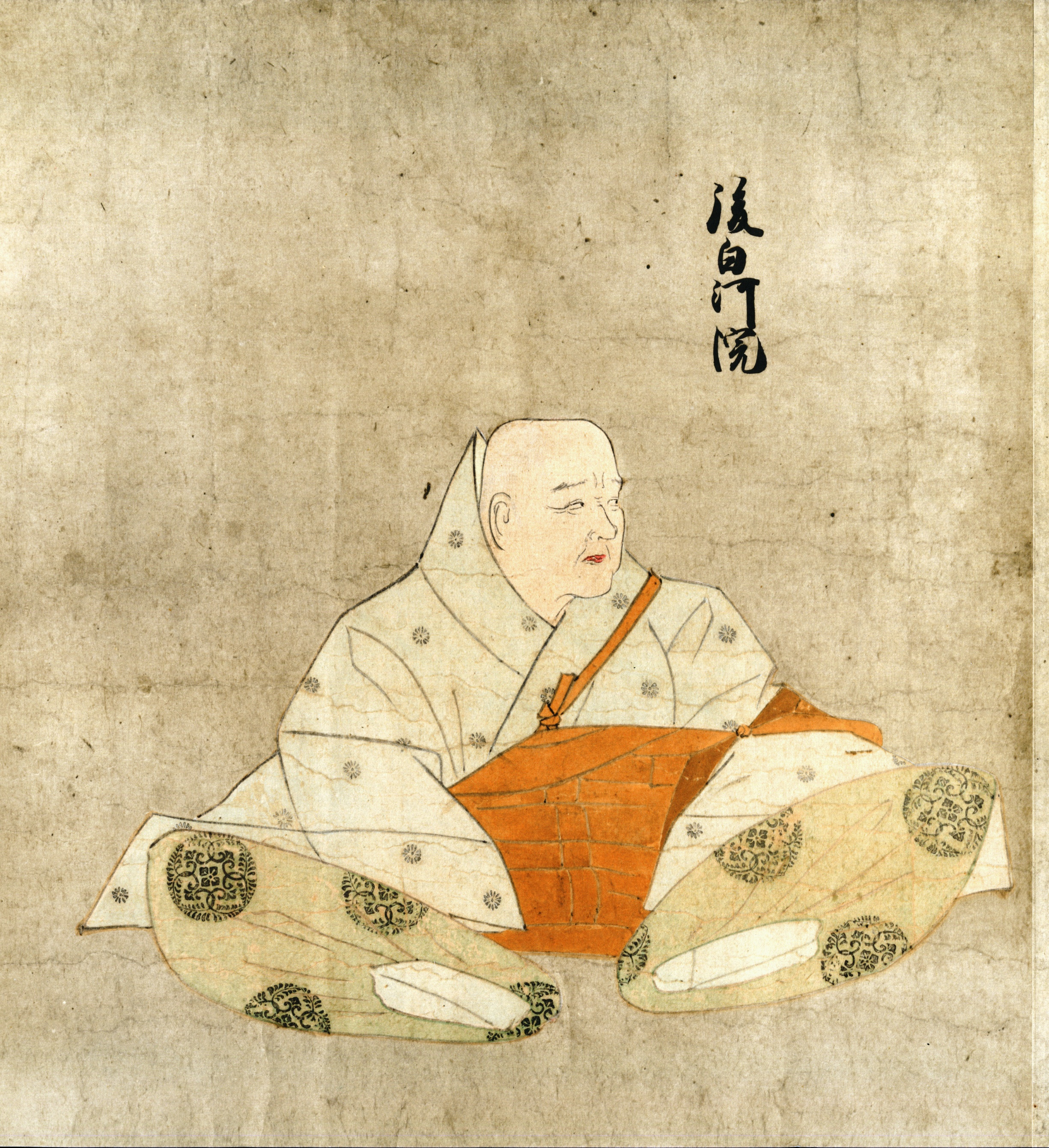
Portrait from the Tenshi Sekkan Miei

On August 22, 1155 (Kyūju 2, 23rd day of the 7th month), Emperor Konoe died at the age of 17 years without leaving any heirs. There was an ensuing succession dispute: The main candidates were Prince Shigehito, son of retired Emperor Sutoku, and Prince Morihito, son of Go-Shirakawa (then named Prince Masahito). Though, according to Gukansho, Bifukumon-in also suggested her daughter Princess Shōshi, Heian society was fundamentally opposed to the idea of a female ruler. Shigehito was expected to succeed and was supported by Fujiwara no Yorinaga, but court nobles centering around Bifukumon-in and Fujiwara no Tadamichi opposed this, fearing Sutoku gaining power as Cloistered Emperor. Securing the support of Cloistered Emperor Toba, a plan was put into place where 29 year old Prince Masahito, Morihito's father, would take the throne as Emperor to secure his son's position until he came of age, skipping the usual status of Crown Prince. The new Emperor, who would be posthumously named Go-Shirakawa, was enthroned late that year.

The resulting effect of disinheriting Sutoku's line, after Sutoku had already previously been made to abdicate in favour of Konoe, infuriated the retired Emperor.

=== Cementing Power ===
On July 20, 1156 (Hōgen 1, 2nd day of the 7th month), the ex-Emperor Toba died at the age of 54. Soon afterwards, the Hōgen Rebellion broke out – Yorinaga had mustered several hundred warriors to try to press Sutoku's claim and usurp Go-Shirakawa's title. However, Go-Shirakawa gained the support of the two most powerful warrior clans, the Taira and the Minamoto, through their leaders, Minamoto no Yoshitomo and Taira no Kiyomori. Together, they easily defeated the armies of Sutoku leaving Go-Shirakawa as the sole imperial ruler. Historian George Sansom argues that because the course of the insurrection was dictated by the military clans, this moment represents a turning point in the nature of Japanese politics; the imperial clan had lost all authority and the military clans now controlled the political landscape. Sansom develops this point to assert that an intrinsic part of the insei system was the security it granted the emperors, as they often entered religion; the sacrosanctity of monks and priests was an intrinsic part of Japanese culture. Given that Sutoku was overthrown by the military clans and Go-Shirakawa, his position cannot truly be considered to have been secure, Sansom argues, and so the Hōgen Rebellion represents the end of the insei system.

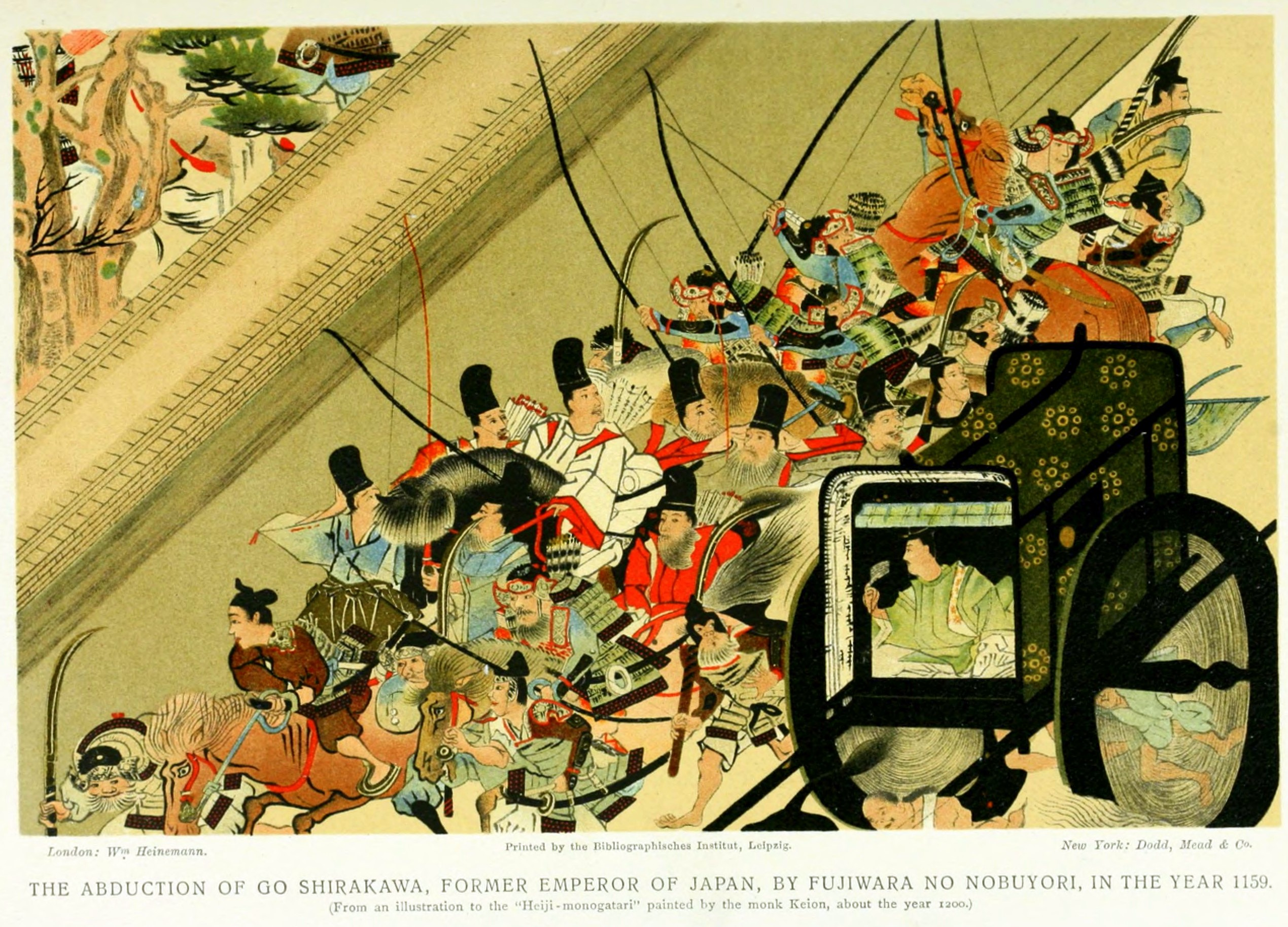
The Heiji Rebellion of 1160

In 1158 Go-Shirakawa abdicated to his son Nijō and became the cloistered emperor (the term used here out of practicality rather than as a validation of one point of view on the aforementioned issue), maintaining this position through the reigns of five emperors (Nijō, Rokujō, Takakura, Antoku, and Go-Toba) until his death in 1192.

=== Rule of Kiyomori ===
Go-Shirakawa was initially an ally of Kiyomori – the latter began trade with China and supported Go-Shirakawa, not just militarily but also financially. The tension between the aforementioned foremost military clans, the Taira and Minamoto, led to the Heiji Rebellion of 1160. The Minamoto lost and the Taira attained ascendancy. As Kiyomori's power reached its zenith, the good relations between him and Go-Shirakawa ended – Kiyomori's reign became hubristic and indeed despotic, with the Taira showing unequivocal disrespect not only towards the imperial clan, but towards the other high-ranking families as well. For example, in 1170 Taira men humiliated the reigning Fujiwara Regent, Fujiwara no Motofusa, after his retinue and that of Kiyomori's son, Shigemori, collided.

This meant that in 1169 (Kaō 1, 6th month) Emperor Go-Shirakawa entered the Buddhist priesthood at the age of 42 – he felt he could no longer control Kiyomori. He took the Buddhist name of Gyōshin. Furthermore, Kiyomori's behaviour caused Go-Shirakawa to support a planned coup d'etat, known as the Shishigatani incident. The conspiracy was betrayed and all involved were punished; Go-Shirakawa was confined to Toba-in, the eponymous palace of Toba.

It could be argued that Go-Shirakawa himself further increased Kiyomori's power even after their relationship fell apart. He deposed his son Rokujō in 1168 and elevated Takakura to the imperial throne. Takakura was the son of Kiyomori's sister-in-law, and so he attained a familial link to the imperial clan in a manner not dissimilar to that of the Fujiwara. Indeed, Kiyomori could have seized the power of Regent and Go-Shirakawa would have been powerless to stop him, due to this marital link.

=== Genpei War ===
Go-Shirakawa planned to regain power through the Taira's old rivals, the Minamoto. They had been steadily recovering their strength in the provinces following their defeat in 1160. In May 1180, Minamoto no Yorimasa sent a call to arms to his clan in the eastern and northern provinces. The call to arms was issued in the name of Prince Mochihito, Yorimasa's candidate for the imperial throne. Kiyomori became aware of this and subsequently confined Go-Shirakawa even more closely and called for the arrest of his son, Mochihito. Although the rebellion was defeated, it was the first of many and would eventually lead to the Taira's downfall.

In short, the Minamoto won after a hard-fought war and with the continual support of Go-Shirakawa, who had been in contact with Minamoto no Yoritomo since Kiyomori's death in 1181. In 1183 the army of Minamoto no Yoshinaka entered the capital, allowing for Go-Shirakawa's re-entry into the city – he had made a pilgrimage to various shrines, accompanied by armed monks, in order to avoid capture by the Taira. Go-Shirakawa then issued a mandate for Yoshinaka to join with Minamoto no Yukiie in "destroying Munemori and his army", as well as the entire Taira clan. The emperor bestowed upon Yoshinaka the title of Asahi Shōgun (旭 将軍).

Go-Shirakawa also contributed to the Taira's defeat by attempting to persuade them to lower their guard; in 1184 he promised that if the Taira returned the Imperial Regalia and the emperor he would facilitate a truce with the Minamoto. This meant that they were unprepared for the rapid attack of Minamoto no Noriyori and Minamoto no Yoshitsune at the Battle of Ichi-no-Tani, a decisive battle in the war.

Throughout the entire war there were disagreements and struggles for power within the Minamoto clan, which was barely held together by Minamoto no Yoritomo. When Yoritomo secured the support of Go-Shirakawa in this power struggle, Yoshinaka seized the cloistered emperor and burned his palace.

After continued internal struggles within the Minamoto clan and fighting with the Taira, Yoshitsune finally destroyed the Taira clan entirely in 1185 at the naval Battle of Dan-no-ura.

=== Later life and death ===
Although Yoritomo and Go-Shirakawa disagreed in the late 1180s, again related to internal Minamoto issues, after the death of Yoshitsune, Go-Shirakawa and Yoritomo reconciled. Go-Shirakawa allowed Yoritomo to form a shogunate – the imperial authority and validation was required to attain the position of Shogun - although Yoritomo was only officially invested with the position several months after the death of the Retired Emperor.

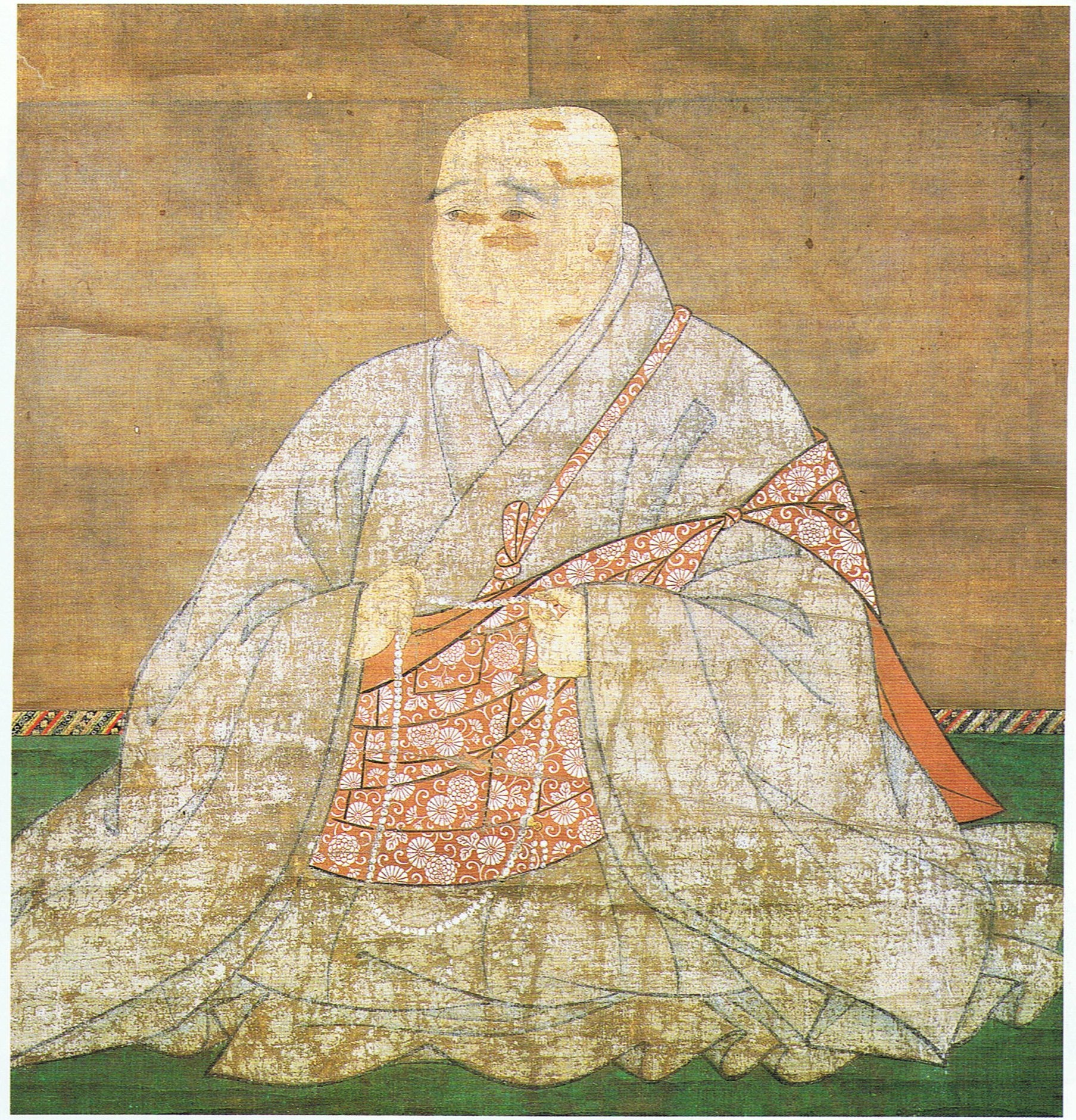
Retired emperor in tonsure.

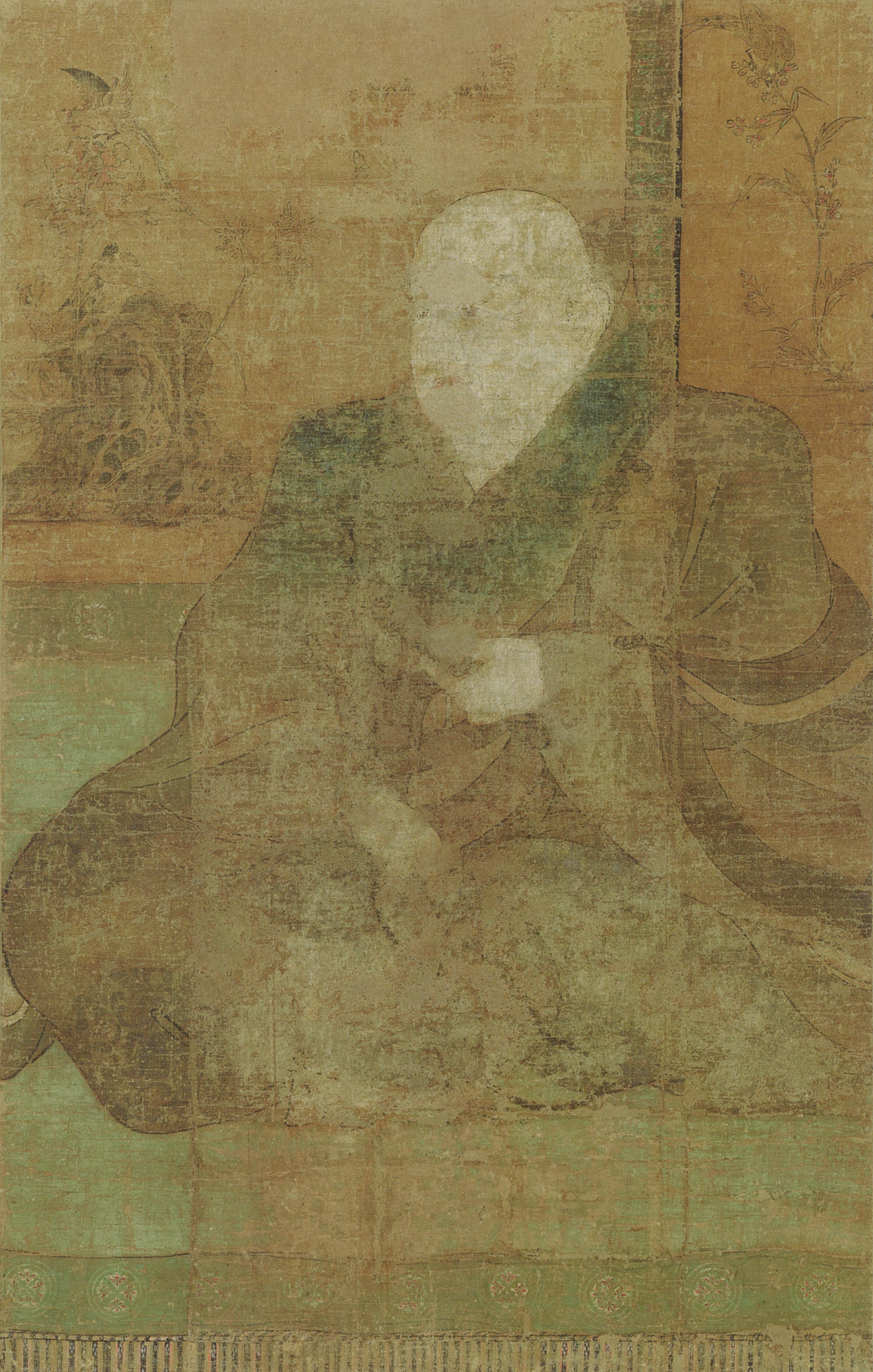
Portrait of Emperor Go-Shirakawa painted in 13th century at Myōhō-in temple, Kyoto

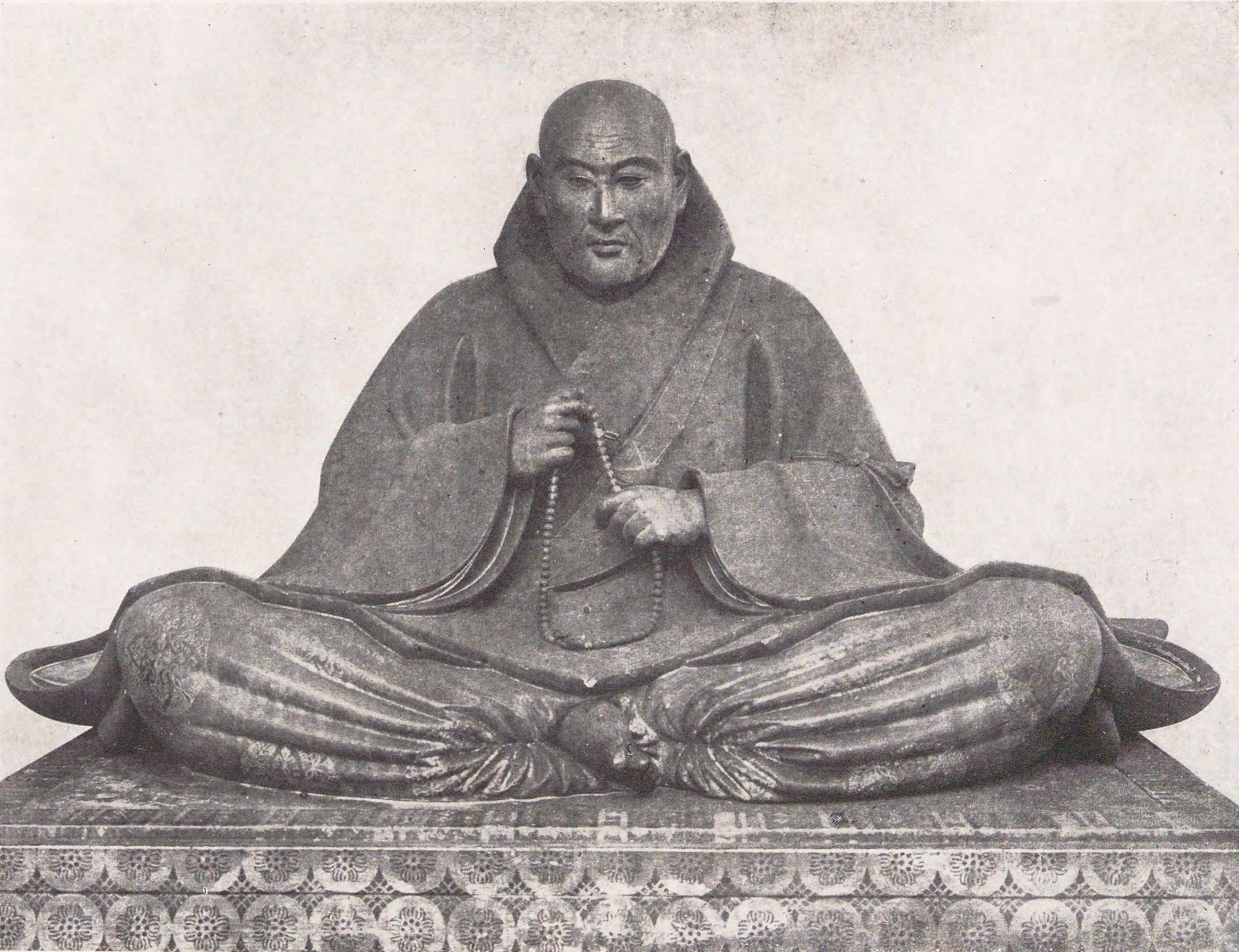
Statue of Emperor Go-Shirakawa, Choko-do temple, Kyoto

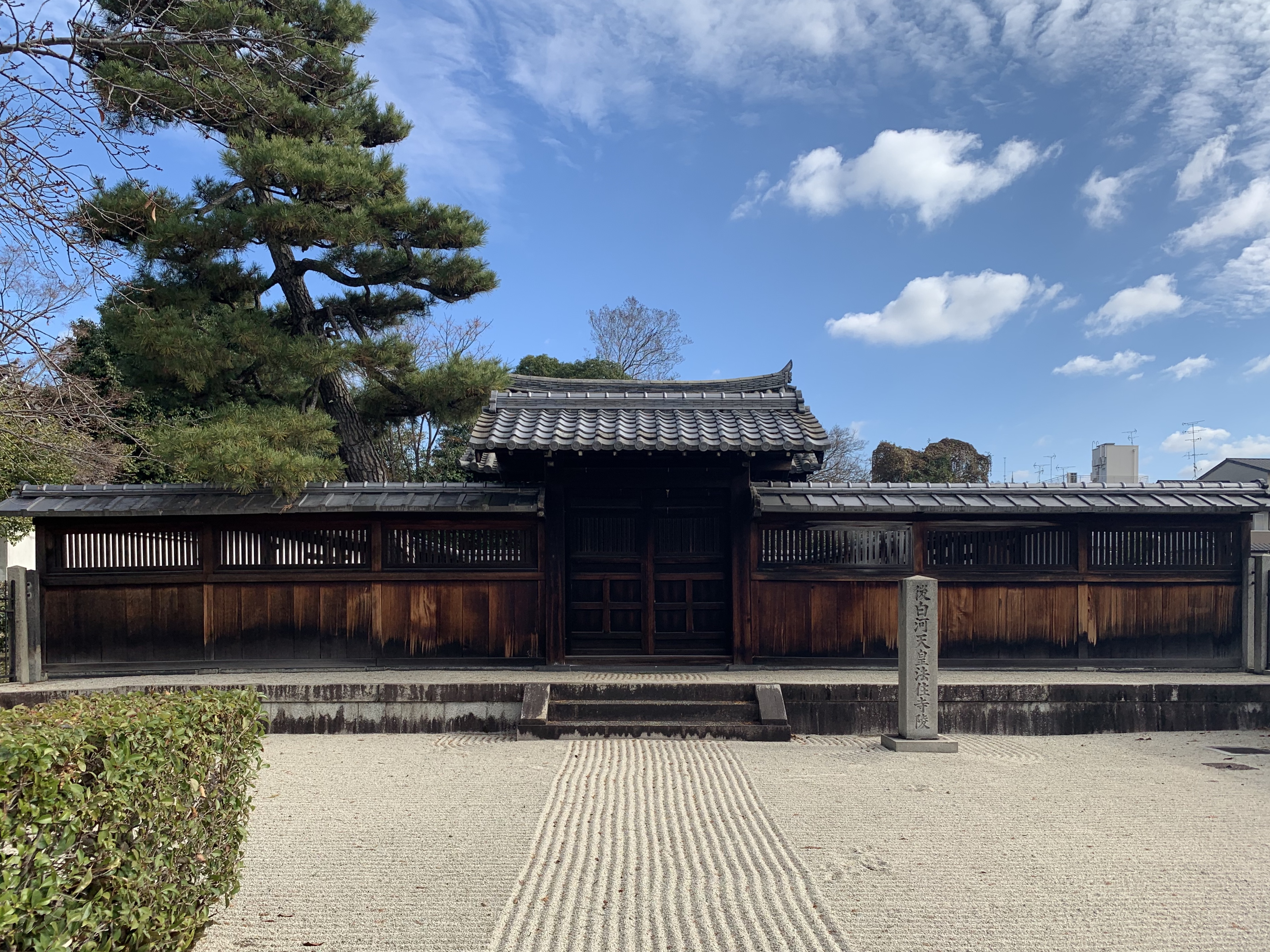
Tomb of Emperor Go-Shirakawa in Kyoto

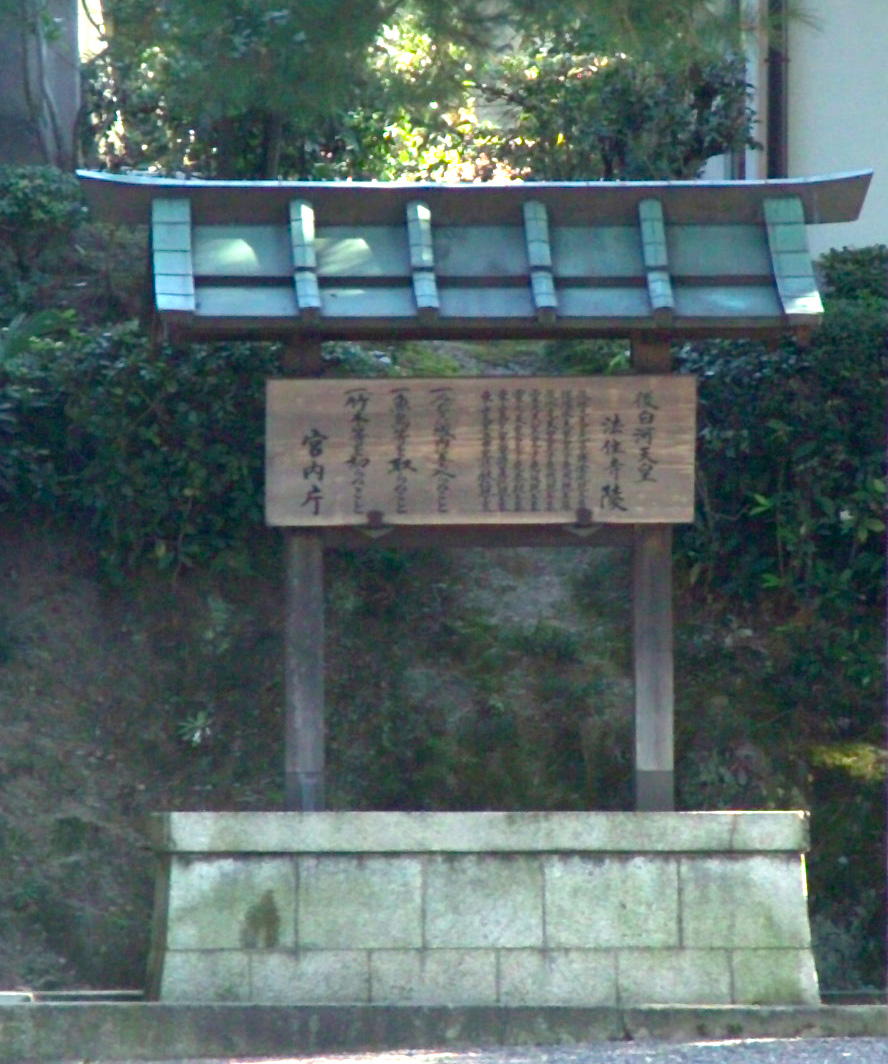
Signboard by Imperial Household Agency

In 1192 (Kenkyū 3, 13th day of the 3rd month) Go-Shirakawa died at the age of 66. He had been father to two emperors – Nijō, the 78th emperor; Takakura, the 80th emperor and grandfather to three emperors – Rokujō, the 79th emperor; Antoku, the 81st emperor; and Go-Toba, the 82nd emperor.

The Imperial Household has designated Hōjū-ji no Misasagi at Kyoto as the emperor's official mausoleum.

== Personality ==
Go-Shirakawa is usually characterised as manipulative and deceptive, as well as being inconstant and following whatever was the fashion of the day, whether politically or otherwise. Yoritomo called him "the biggest tengu of Japan". Furthermore, he was also criticized for excessively patronizing literature and religion, being an avid collector of imayo poetry since his youth, with these poems often being focused on Buddhist themes. He spent lavishly on restoring and expanding temples and shrines, such as his restoration of the Todai-ji after the Taira burned it down in 1180. He was also accused of encouraging the warrior monks of the great temples to attempt to wield even greater influence than they already possessed.

== Genealogy ==
Before his ascension to the Chrysanthemum Throne, his personal name (his imina) was Masahito-shinnō (雅仁親王).

He was the fourth son of Emperor Toba. His mother was Fujiwara no Tamako, Fujiwara no Kinzane‘s daughter.

Major consorts and children:

- Consort (shinnō-hi): Minamoto Yoshiko (源懿子; 1116-1143), Fujiwara no Tsunezane‘s daughter and Minamoto Arihito's adopted daughter
  - First son: Imperial Prince Morihito (守仁親王) later Emperor Nijō
- Empress (chūgū): Fujiwara Kinshi (藤原忻子), Tokudaiji Kinyoshi
- Kōtaigō: Taira no Shigeko (平滋子; 1142-1176) later Kenshunmon’in (建春門院), Taira no Tokinobu's daughter
  - Seventh son: Imperial Prince Norihito (憲仁親王) later Emperor Takakura
- Court Lady: Sanjō (Fujiwara) Sōko (三条（藤原）琮子; 1145-1231), Sanjō Kinnori's daughter
- Lady-in-Waiting: Fujiwara Shigeko (藤原成子; d.1177), Fujiwara Suenari's daughter
  - First Daughter: Imperial Princess Sukeko (亮子内親王) later Inpumon'in (殷富門院)
  - Second Daughter: Imperial princess Yoshiko (好子内親王;1148-1192)
  - Third Daughter: Imperial Princess Shikishi (式子内親王) later Ōinomikado-saiin (大炊御門斎院)
  - Second Son: Imperial Prince Priest Shukaku (守覚法親王; 1150-1202)
  - Third son: Prince Mochihito (以仁王)
  - Fourth Daughter: Imperial Princess Kyūshi (休子内親王; 1157-1171)
- Bomon-no-Tsubone (坊門局), Taira Nobushige's daughter
  - Fourth Son: Imperial Prince Priest En'e (円恵法親王; 1152-1183)
  - Fifth Son: Imperial Prince Priest Jōkei (定恵法親王; 1156-1196)
  - Sixth Son: Go’e (恒恵; 1159-1206)
- Bomon-dono (坊門殿), Tokudaiji Kin’yoshi's daughter
  - Fifth Daughter: Imperial Princess Atsuko (惇子内親王; 1158-1172)
- Sanjo-no-Tsubone (三条局), Priest's daughter
  - Tenth Son: Imperial Prince Priest Dōhō (道法法親王; 1166-1214)
  - Twelfth Son: Shinte (真禎; b.1169)
- Tanba-no-Tsubone (丹波局), Priest's daughter
  - Eighth Son: Imperial Prince Priest Jōe (静恵法親王; 1164-1203)
  - Eleventh Son: Imperial Prince Priest Shōnin (承仁法親王; 1169-1197)
- Uemonnosuke (右衛門佐), Fujiwara Suketaka's daughter
  - Ninth Son: In no miko (院の御子; B.1165)
- Omiya-no-Tsubone (大宮局), Fujiwara Korezane's daughter
- Konoe-no-Tsubone (近衛局), Fujiwara Kinyasu's daughter
- Miko no hime-gimi (御子姫君; 1164-1181), Taira no Kiyomori’s daughter
- Takashina Eishi (高階 栄子; 1151-1216), Priest's daughter
  - Sixth Daughter: Imperial Princess Kinshi (覲子内親王; 1181-1252) later Sen'yōmon'in (宣陽門院)

== Ancestry ==
Ancestors of Emperor Go-Shirakawa

8. Emperor Shirakawa (1053-1130)
4.Emperor Horikawa (1079-1107)
9. Fujiwara no Kenshi (1057-1084)
2. Emperor Toba (1103-1156)
10.Fujiwara no Sanesue (1035-1092) (=12)
5.Fujiwara no Ishi (1076-1103)
11.Fujiwara no Mutsuko (=13)
1. Emperor Go-Shirakawa
12.Fujiwara no Sanesue (1035-1092) (=10)
6. Fujiwara no Kinzane (1053-1107)
13. Fujiwara no Mutsuko (=11)
3. Fujiwara no Tamako (1101-1145)
14. Fujiwara no Takakata (1014-1079)
7. Fujiwara no Mitsuko (1060-1121)

== See also ==
- Emperor of Japan
- List of Emperors of Japan
- Imperial cult

== Notes ==
Regnal titles
Preceded by Emperor Konoe	Emperor of Japan: Go-Shirawaka; 1155–1158	Succeeded by Emperor Nijō
