= Kikaijima =

Island within the Amami Islands of Japan

Native name: Kyaa (喜界島)
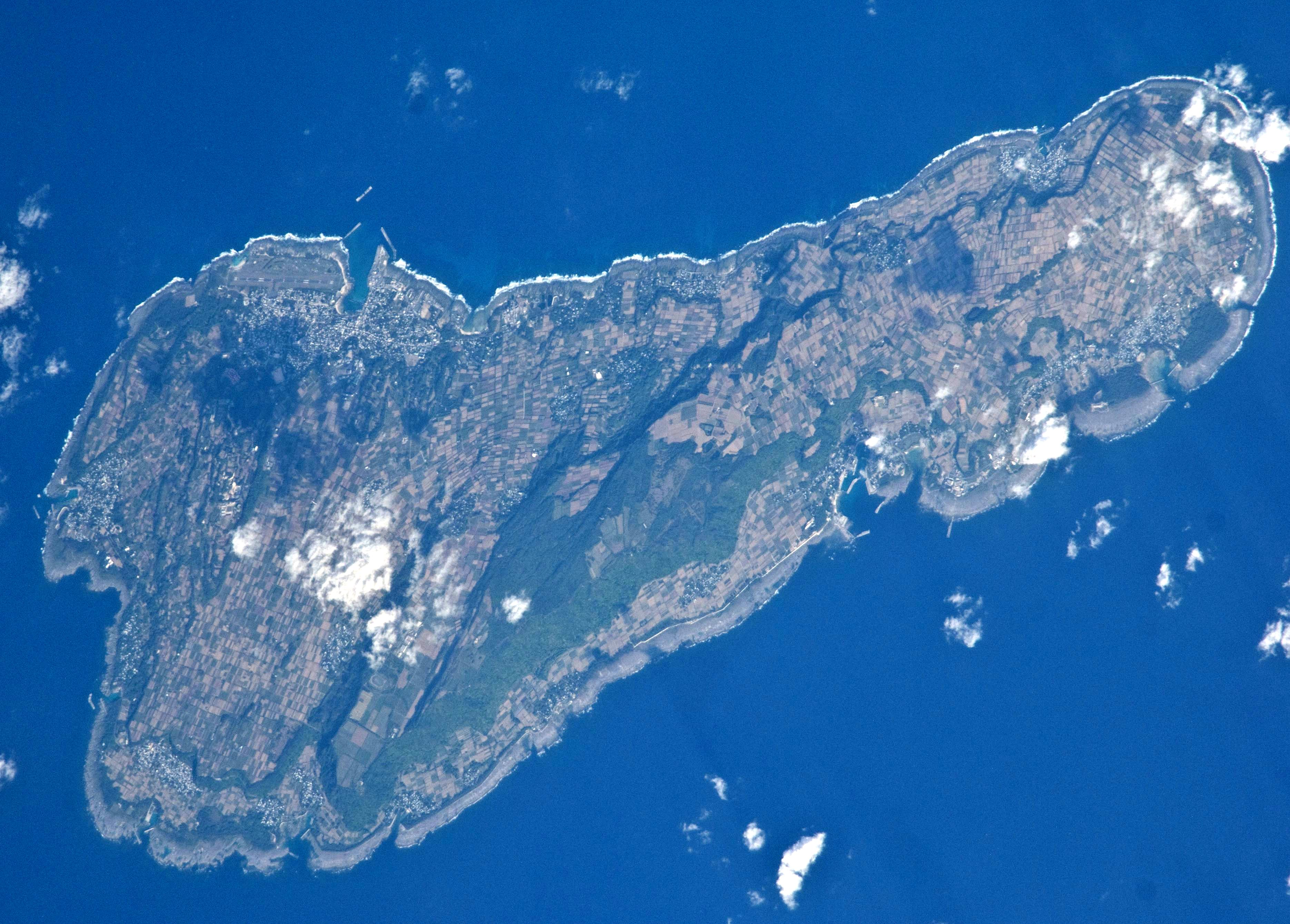
- Kikaijima

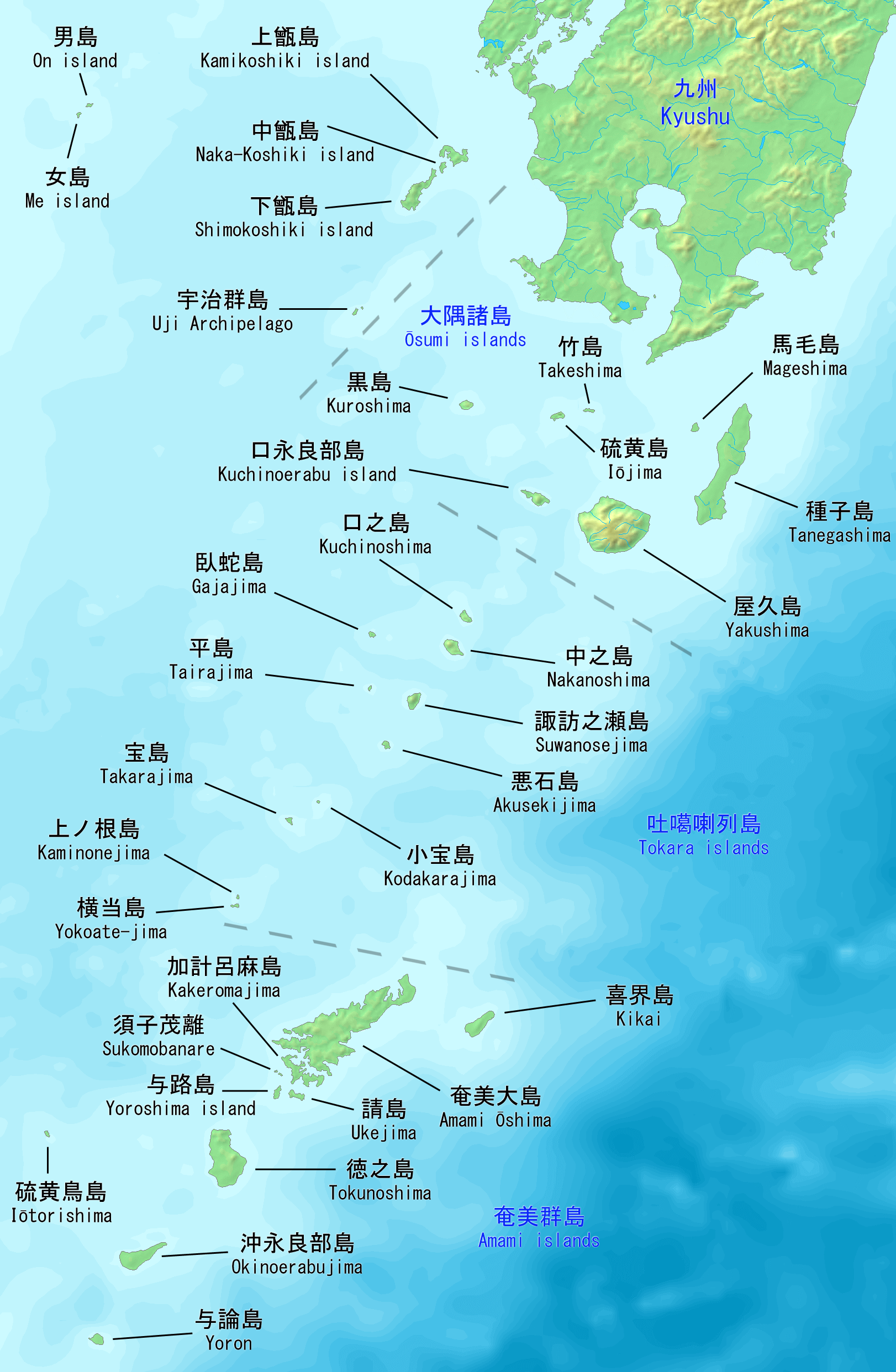

Geography
- Location: East China Sea
- Coordinates: 28°19′35″N 129°58′27″E
- Archipelago: Amami Islands
- Area: 56.93 km^{2} (21.98 sq mi)
- Coastline: 48.6 km (30.2 mi)
- Highest elevation: 214 m (702 ft)

Administration
- Japan
- Prefectures: Kagoshima Prefecture
- District: Ōshima District
- Town: Kikai

Demographics
- Population: 7,657 (2013)
- Pop. density: 134.49/km^{2} (348.33/sq mi)
- Ethnic groups: Ryukyuan, Japanese

Kikaijima (Japanese: 喜界島; Amami: Kyaa; Okinawan: Cikai-zima) is one of the Satsunan Islands, classed with the Amami archipelago between Kyūshū and Okinawa.

The island, 56.93 square kilometres (21.98 sq mi) in area, has a population of approximately 7,657 people. Administratively the island forms the town of Kikai, Kagoshima Prefecture. Much of the island is within the borders of the Amami Guntō Quasi-National Park.

== Name ==
The name Kikai is attested in Old and Middle Okinawan with the various phonemic kana spellings ききや, きゝや, きちゃ, きちや, ちちや, and ちちやァ, which may have been the antecedent of the Kikai name.

== Geography ==
Kikaijima is isolated from the other Amami islands, and is located approximately 25 kilometres (13 nmi; 16 mi) east of Amami Ōshima and approximately 380 kilometres (210 nmi; 240 mi) south of the southern tip of Kyūshū. It is the easternmost island in the Amami chain. Compared with Amami Ōshima and Tokunoshima, Kikaijima is a relatively flat island, with its highest point at 214 metres (702 ft) above sea level. It is a raised coral island with limestone cliffs, and draws the attention of geologists as it is one of the fastest rising coral islands in the world.

=== Climate ===
The climate of Kikaijima is classified as a humid subtropical climate (Köppen climate classification Cfa) with very warm summers and mild winters. The rainy season lasts from May through September. The island is subject to frequent typhoons.

Climate data for Kikaijima (2000–2020 normals, extremes 2000–present)
Month	Jan	Feb	Mar	Apr	May	Jun	Jul	Aug	Sep	Oct	Nov	Dec	Year
Record high °C (°F)	24.8 (76.6)	24.9 (76.8)	25.8 (78.4)	27.4 (81.3)	31.9 (89.4)	32.0 (89.6)	35.0 (95.0)	36.9 (98.4)	34.6 (94.3)	32.2 (90.0)	29.1 (84.4)	27.2 (81.0)	36.9 (98.4)
Mean daily maximum °C (°F)	18.5 (65.3)	19.2 (66.6)	20.6 (69.1)	22.9 (73.2)	25.8 (78.4)	28.2 (82.8)	31.5 (88.7)	32.0 (89.6)	30.6 (87.1)	27.8 (82.0)	24.2 (75.6)	20.3 (68.5)	25.1 (77.2)
Daily mean °C (°F)	15.6 (60.1)	16.1 (61.0)	17.4 (63.3)	19.8 (67.6)	22.7 (72.9)	25.5 (77.9)	28.4 (83.1)	28.6 (83.5)	27.4 (81.3)	24.7 (76.5)	21.2 (70.2)	17.5 (63.5)	22.1 (71.7)
Mean daily minimum °C (°F)	12.6 (54.7)	13.0 (55.4)	14.3 (57.7)	16.6 (61.9)	19.9 (67.8)	23.5 (74.3)	26.0 (78.8)	26.0 (78.8)	24.7 (76.5)	22.0 (71.6)	18.4 (65.1)	14.6 (58.3)	19.3 (66.7)
Record low °C (°F)	4.8 (40.6)	4.2 (39.6)	5.0 (41.0)	7.4 (45.3)	11.8 (53.2)	16.5 (61.7)	21.4 (70.5)	21.7 (71.1)	19.4 (66.9)	14.3 (57.7)	9.3 (48.7)	7.3 (45.1)	4.2 (39.6)
Average precipitation mm (inches)	119.4 (4.70)	105.0 (4.13)	151.1 (5.95)	146.6 (5.77)	215.1 (8.47)	304.3 (11.98)	124.8 (4.91)	150.9 (5.94)	213.9 (8.42)	171.1 (6.74)	126.0 (4.96)	102.7 (4.04)	1,892.7 (74.52)
Average precipitation days (≥ 1.0 mm)	12.8	11.6	12.9	11.0	12.1	12.9	7.4	9.7	10.6	10.6	9.5	11.8	132.9
Source: Japan Meteorological Agency

== Flora and fauna ==
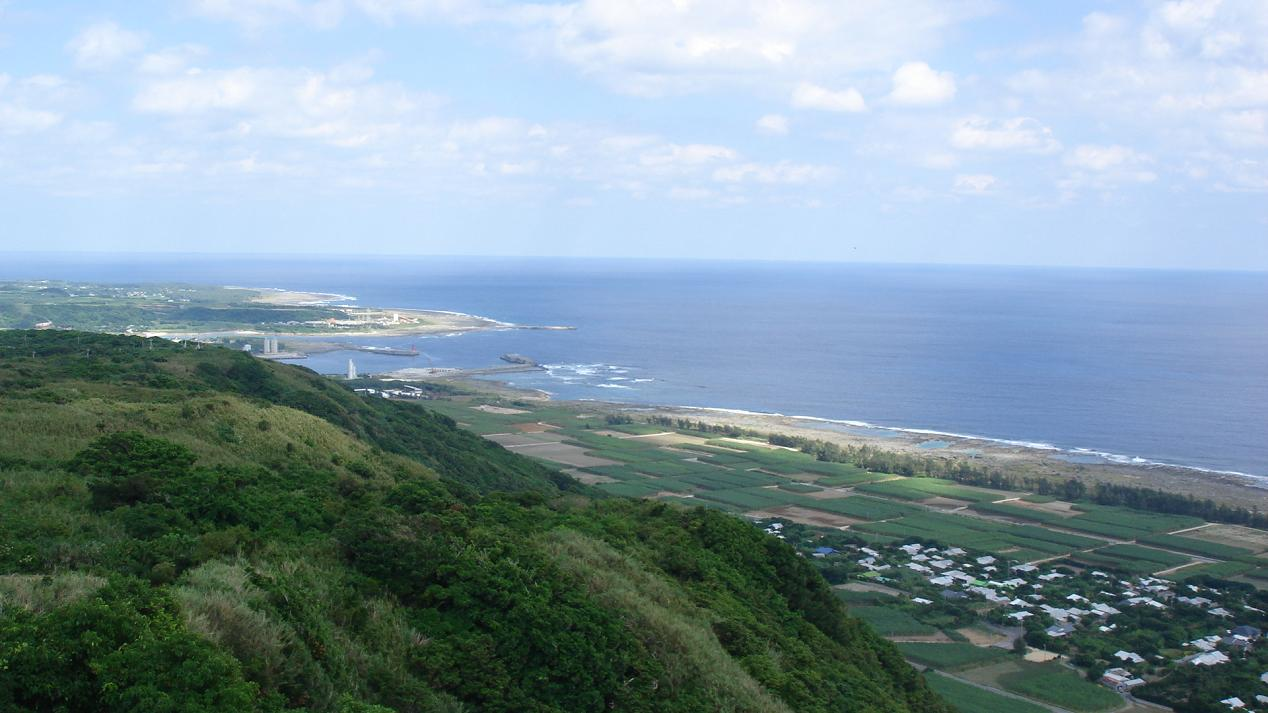
Hyakunodai, Kikaijima

Due to its relative isolation, Kikaijima is home to several rare species endemic to the island itself, or more generally to the Ryukyu archipelago. However, it is one of the few islands in the Amami chain to which the venomous habu viper is not indigenous. Larger biogenically coated nodules (25–130 mm in diameter), named macroids, have been found off Kikai-jima shelf, at water depths of 61 to 105 m. These macroids are made up by encrusting acervulind foraminifera. These macroids host boring bivalves whose holes represent the ichnogenus Gastrochaenolites.

== History ==
Although the Ryukyu Islands appeared in written history as Japan's southern frontier, the name of Kikaijima was not recorded in early years. The Nihongi ryaku (c. 11th–12th centuries) states that in 998 Dazaifu, the administrative center of Kyūshū ordered Kikajima (貴駕島) to arrest the Nanban (southern barbarians), who in the previous year had pillaged a wide area of western Kyūshū. The Nanban were identified as Amami islanders by the Shōyūki (982–1032 for the extant portion). Accordingly, it is assumed that Dazaifu had a stronghold in the Kikaijima concerned.

The Shinsarugakuki, a fiction written by an aristocrat Fujiwara no Akihira in the mid-11th century, introduced a merchant named Hachirō-mauto, who traveled all the way to the land of the Fushū in the east and to Kika-no-shima (貴賀之島) in the west.

Some articles of 1187 of the Azuma Kagami state that during the period of the Taira clan's rule, Ata Tadakage of Satsuma Province fled to Kikaijima (貴海島). The Azuma Kagami also states that in 1188 Minamoto no Yoritomo, who soon became shōgun, dispatched troops to pacify Kikaijima (貴賀井島). It was noted that the imperial court objected to the military expedition claiming that it was beyond Japan's administration.

The Tale of the Heike (13th century) depicted Kikaijima (鬼界島), where Shunkan, Taira no Yasuyori, and Fujiwara no Naritsune were exiled following the Shishigatani Incident of 1177.

Boats rarely passed, and people were scared. Residents were dark colored and their words were incomprehensible. Men did not wear eboshi, and women did not wear their hair down. There were no farmers or grain, not even clothing. In the center of the island was a tall mountain, and it was constantly in flames. Due to the large amounts of sulfur, the island was also known as Sulfur Island.

— The Tale of the Heike

The island depicted, characterized by sulfur, is identified as Satsuma Iōjima of the Ōsumi Islands, which is part of Kikai Caldera.

There are some controversies over which Kikaijima described in these sources refers to. It may be the modern-day Kikaijima, Satsuma Iōjima or a collective name for the southern islands. From the late 10th century, Kikaijima was seen as the center of the southern islands by mainland Japan. It is also noted by scholars that the character representing the first syllable of Kikai changed from "貴" (noble) to "鬼" (ghost) from the end of the 12th century to the early 13th century.

Archaeologically speaking, the Gusuku Site Complex, discovered in Kikaijima in 2006, rewrites the history of the Ryukyu Islands. The group of archaeological sites on the plateau is one of the largest sites of the Ryukyu Islands of the era. It lasted from 9th to 13th centuries and at its height from the second half of the 11th to the first half of the 12th century. It was characterized by a near-total absence of the native Kaneku Type pottery, which prevailed in coastal communities. What were found instead were goods imported from mainland Japan, China and Korea. Also found was the Kamuiyaki pottery, which was produced in Tokunoshima from the 11th to 14th centuries. The skewed distribution of Kamuiyaki peaked at Kikaijima and Tokunoshima suggests that the purpose of Kamuiyaki production was to serve it to Kikaijima. The Gusuku Site Complex supports the literature-based theory that Kikaijima was a trade center of the southern islands.

In 1306, Chikama Tokiie, a deputy jitō of Kawanabe District, Satsuma Province on behalf of the Hōjō clan, the de facto ruler of the Kamakura shogunate, created a set of documents that specified properties to be inherited by his family members, which included Kikaijima, together with other islands of the Ōsumi, Tokara and Amami Islands. After the fall of the Kamakura shogunate, the southern islands seem to have been transferred to the Shimazu clan. It claimed the jito of the Twelve Islands, which were limited to the Ōsumi and Tokara Islands. However, when Shimazu Sadahisa, the head of the clan, handed over Satsuma Province to his son Morohisa in 1363, he added the extra Five Islands as the territories to be succeeded, which seem to refer to the Amami Islands including Kikaijima.

Kikaijima was conquered by the Ryūkyū Kingdom. The Haedong Jegukgi (1471), whose source was a Japanese monk visiting Korea in 1453, describes Kikaijima as a territory of Ryūkyū. An article of 1462 in the Annals of the Joseon Dynasty, which records an interview from a Jeju islander who had drifted to Okinawa in 1456, states that Kikaijima was resisting Ryūkyū's repeated invasions. According to the Chūzan Seikan (1650), King Shō Toku himself pacified Kikaijima in 1466, claiming that Kikaijima had not paid tribute for years.

As a result of Satsuma Domain's conquest of the Ryūkyū Kingdom of 1609, Kikaijima fell under the direct control of Satsuma. After the Meiji Restoration it was incorporated into Ōsumi Province and later became part of Kagoshima Prefecture. Following World War II, although with the other Amami Islands, it was occupied by the United States until 1953, at which time it reverted to the control of Japan.

In 2018 resident Nabi Tajima, the last remaining person known to have been born in the 19th century, died in a local medical facility.

== Transportation ==
Kikaijima is connected by regular ferry service to Kagoshima, Amami-Oshima and various of the Amami islands.

Kikai Airport connects the island with Amami-Oshima and Kagoshima by air.

== Economy ==
The economy of the island is based on agriculture (primarily sugar cane and citrus fruits) as well as commercial fishing. Seasonal tourism also plays a role in the local economy. Industry is limited to sugar refining and Shōchū production.

== Strategic location ==
The Japanese Maritime Self-Defense Force maintains an important SIGINT station on the island, which includes a large Circularly Disposed Antenna Array. The station was opened in 2006, and is considered a vital component of the MSDF's JOSIS (JMSDF Ocean Surveillance Information System).

== Language ==
The traditional local language, a Ryukyuan language known as Kikai or Kikai-Ryukyuan, is deemed endangered, as younger generations have little to no knowledge of it.
