= Taira no Kiyomori =

12th-century Japanese military leader

- 平 清盛
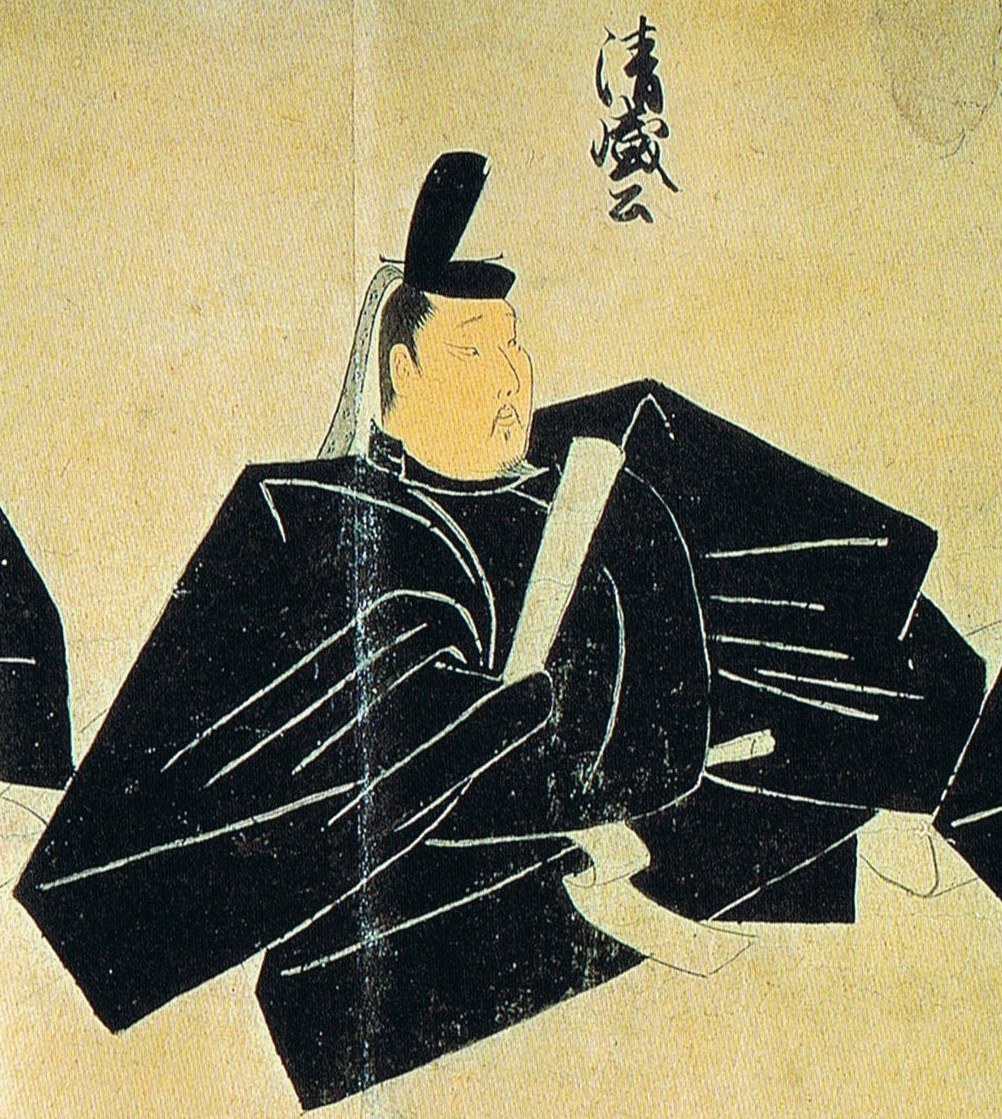
- Born: 1118; Heian-kyō, Japan
- Died: March 20, 1181 (aged 62–63); Heian-kyō, Japan
- Occupations: Military leader, kugyō

Signature
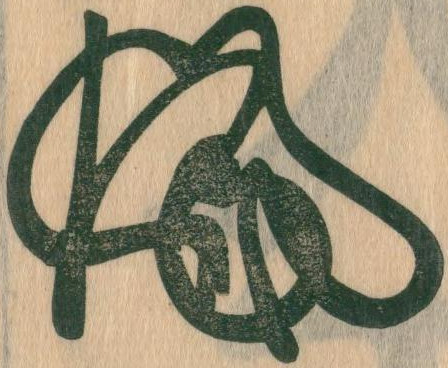

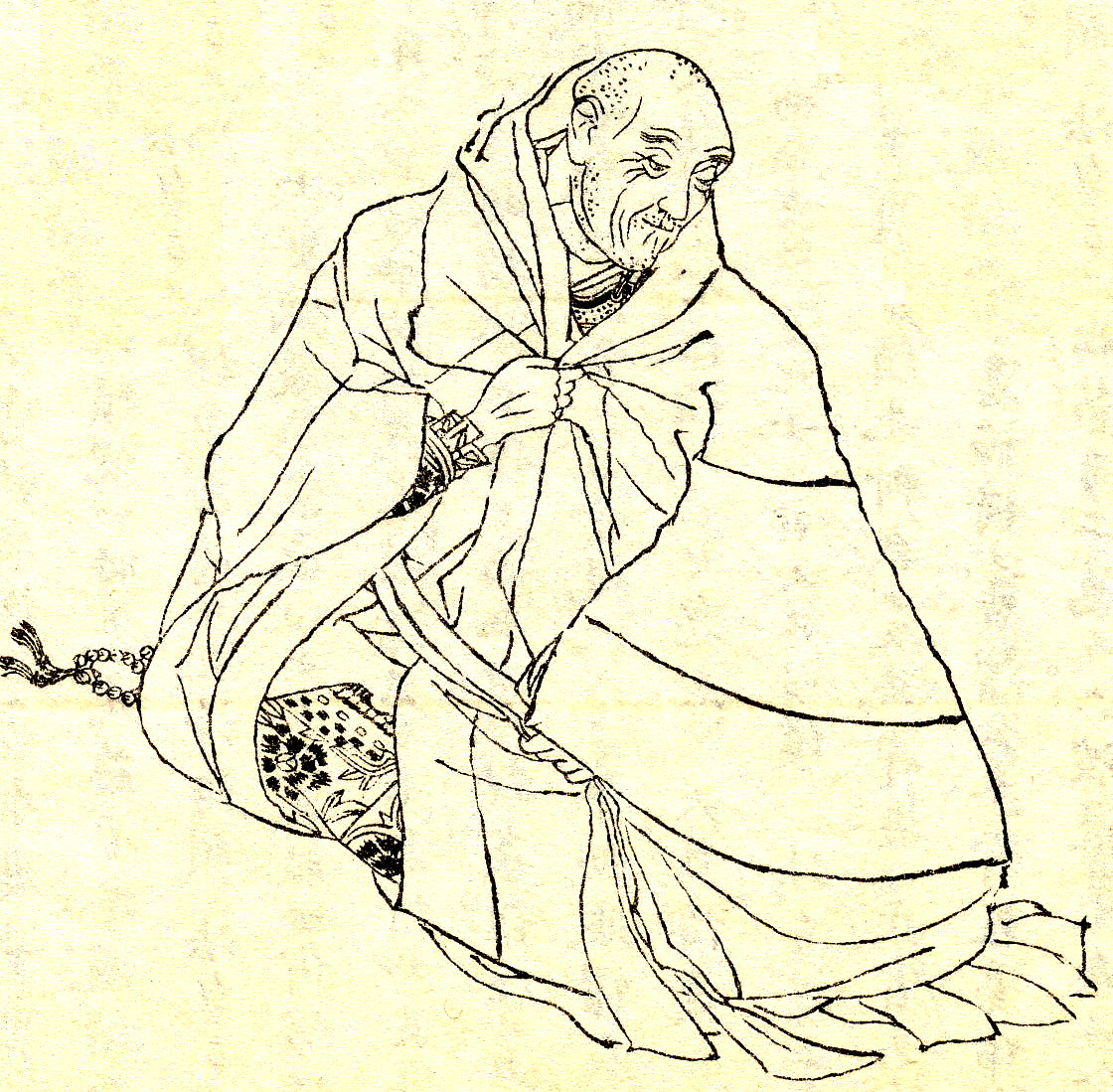
Taira no Kiyomori in his later years, in book illustration by Kikuchi Yōsai

Taira no Kiyomori (平 清盛; Japanese pronunciation: [tä́ì.ɾä̀ nò̞ | k̟ʲì.ꜜjó̞.mò̞.ɾʲì]; 1118 – March 20, 1181) was a Japanese military leader and kugyō of the late Heian period, who was Daijō-daijin and the de facto ruler of Japan from 1167 until his death. He established the first samurai-dominated administrative government in the history of Japan.

He has been dubbed one of "Japan's Three Great Villains" (日本三大梟雄), a nickname he shared with Ashikaga Takauji and Dōkyō, given by Confucian-minded historians due to their lack of loyalty to the throne. (Note: Not to be confused with Matsunaga Hisahide, Saitō Dōsan and Ukita Naoie from Sengoku period, who also shared similar group nickname of Japan's Three Great Villains due to their ambitious and treasonous personality, along with the habit of resorting to underhanded tactics and assassinations to eliminate their opposition.)

== Early life ==
Kiyomori was born in Heian-kyō in 1118 as the first son of Taira no Tadamori. His mother, Gion no Nyogo, was wife of Tadamori and a palace servant according to The Tale of the Heike.

== Career ==
After the death of his father in 1153, Kiyomori assumed control of the Taira clan and ambitiously entered the political realm, in which he had previously only held a minor post. Before that though, in 1156, he and Minamoto no Yoshitomo, head of the Minamoto clan, suppressed the rebels in the Hōgen Rebellion. This established the Taira and Minamoto as the top samurai clans in Kyoto. However, this caused the allies to become bitter rivals which culminated four years later during the Heiji Rebellion in 1160. Kiyomori, emerging victorious over Yoshitomo (whose two eldest sons were killed), was now the head of the single most powerful warrior clan in imperial capital Kyoto. However, his clan's power and influence in the provinces at this time is a matter of debate. Kiyomori showed mercy and exiled a few of Yoshitomo's surviving sons, including Yoritomo, Noriyori, and Yoshitsune – a benevolence that would turn out to be the Taira clan's downfall later on.

Due to his status as the head of the sole remaining warrior clan in imperial court, Kiyomori was in a unique position to manipulate the court rivalry between the retired emperor, Go-Shirakawa, and his son, Emperor Nijō. Because of this manipulation, Kiyomori was able to climb the ranks of government, though the majority of his promotions as well as the success of his family in gaining ranks and titles at court was due to Shirakawa's patronage. This culminated in 1167, when Kiyomori became the first courtier of a warrior family to be appointed daijō-daijin, chief minister of the government, and the de facto administrator of the imperial government. As was the norm, he soon relinquished the position and leadership of the Taira clan, with the goal of maintaining the social and political prestige of having attained the highest office in the land, but being free of the attendant duties. This had been a common practice for many years in the highest levels of ancient Japanese government and in doing so Kiyomori was asserting what he felt was his strong position in the Kyoto government. However, many of the courtiers from traditional civil (non-warrior) noble families were less than pleased with both Kiyomori's attainment of power, and how he comported himself with regard to other high ranking courtiers.

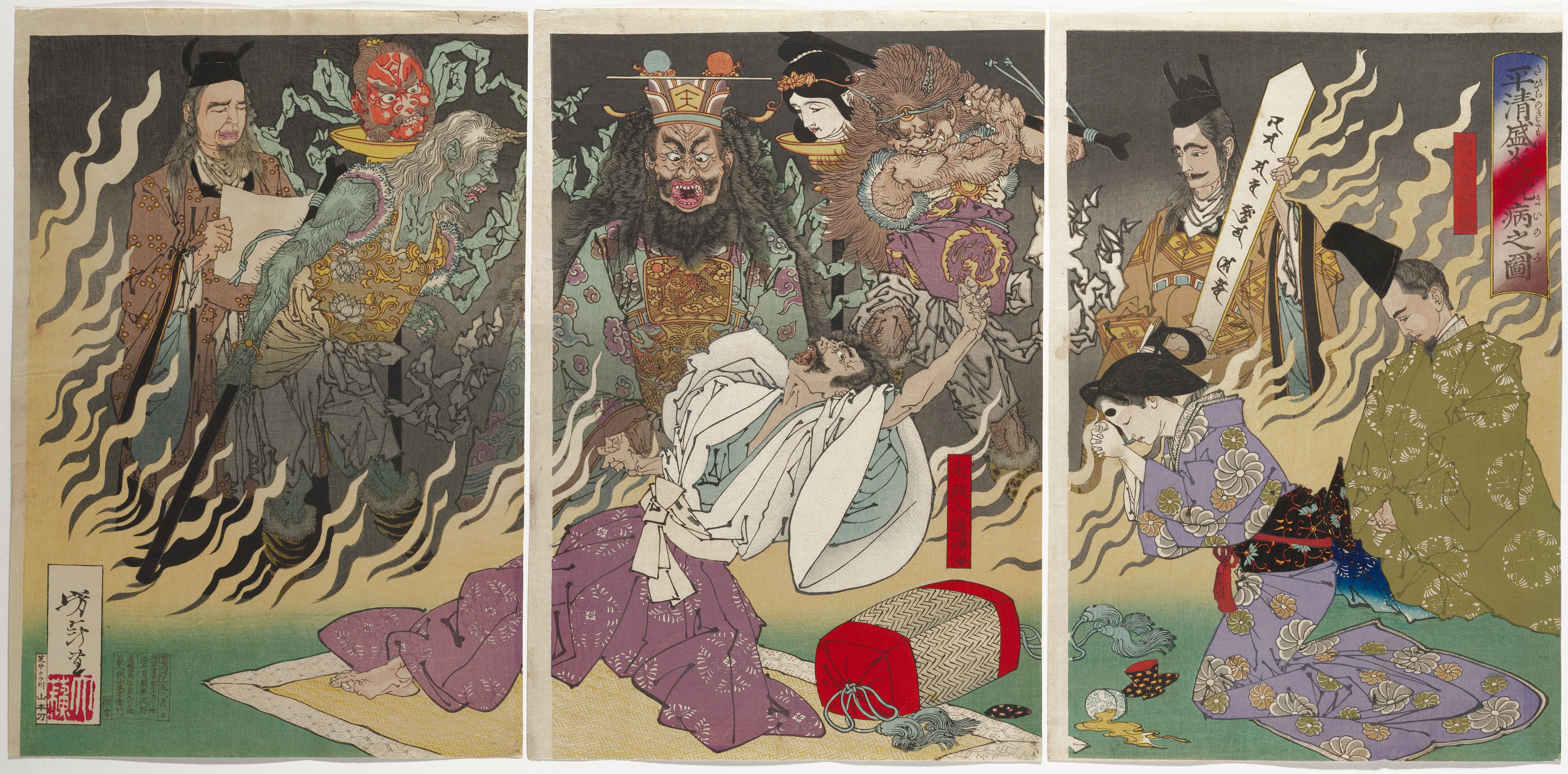
While suffering from a fever, Taira no Kiyomori is confronted by a vision of hell and the ghosts of his victims, in an 1883 print by Yoshitoshi.

In 1171, Kiyomori arranged a marriage between his daughter Tokuko and Emperor Takakura. Their first son, the future Emperor Antoku, was born in 1178. The next year, in 1179, Kiyomori staged a coup d'état forcing the resignation of his rivals from all government posts and subsequently banishing them. He then filled the open government positions with his allies and relatives, and imprisoned (house arrest) the cloistered Emperor Go-Shirakawa. Finally, in 1180 Kiyomori forced Emperor Takakura to abdicate and give Prince Tokihito the throne, who then became Emperor Antoku.

With the exertion of Taira power and wealth and Kiyomori's new monopoly on authority, many of his allies, most of the provincial samurai, and even members of his own clan turned against him. Prince Mochihito, brother of Emperor Takakura, called on Kiyomori's old rivals of the Minamoto clan to rise against the Taira, beginning the Genpei War in the middle of 1180. Kiyomori died early the next year from sickness, leaving his son Munemori to preside over the downfall and destruction of the Taira at the hands of the Minamoto in 1185.

The Tale of the Heike states that as he lay dying, Kiyomori's fever was so high that anyone who attempted to even get near him would be burned by the heat.

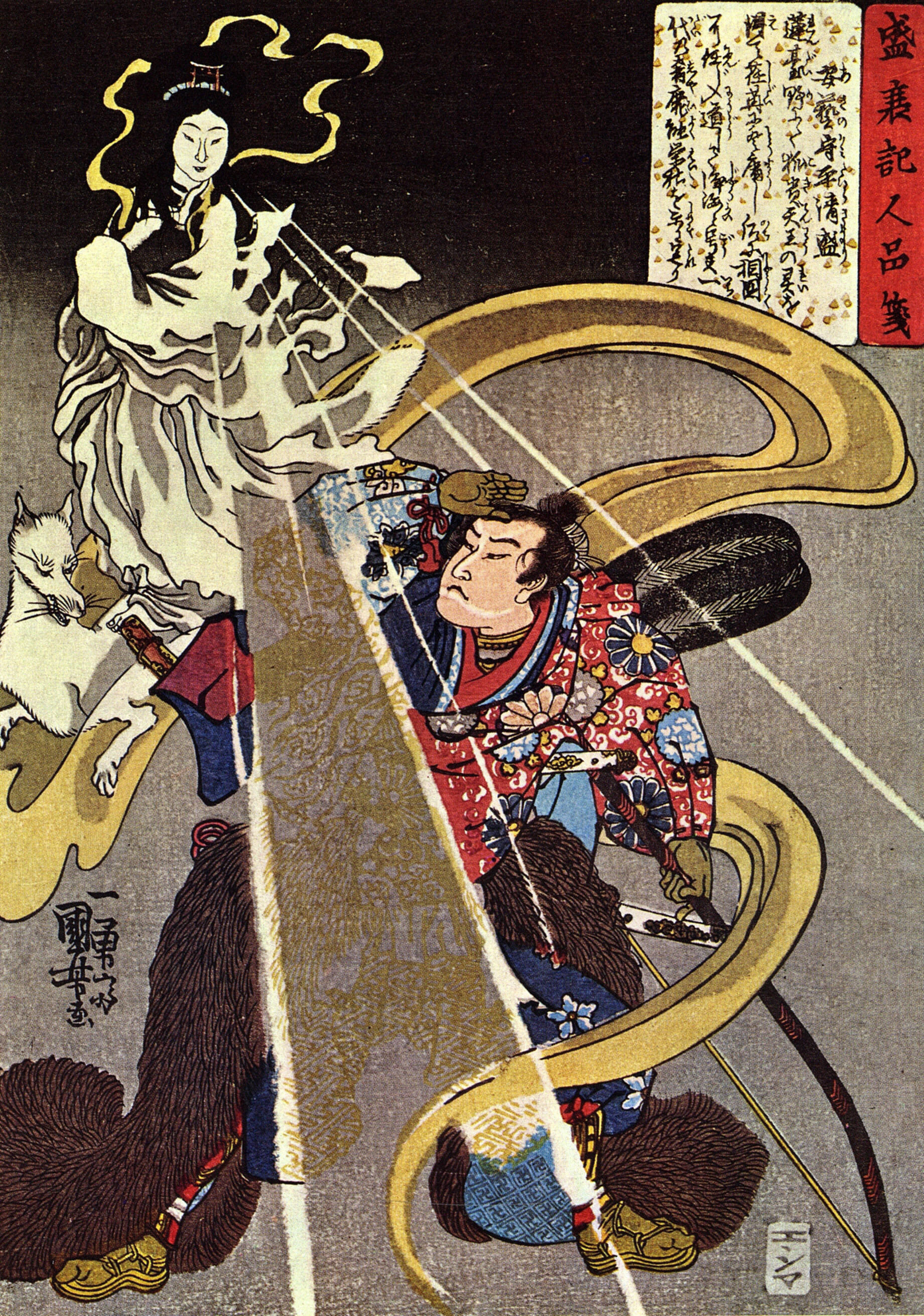
Taira no Kiyomori encounters the fox goddess Kiko Tennō (Dakiniten), by Utagawa Kuniyoshi

The rapid rise of certain notable figures to prominence, as well as their decline, have been popularly attributed to Dakiniten. A certain anecdote regarding the military leader Taira no Kiyomori found in the Genpei Jōsuiki (one of a number of variants of the Heike Monogatari) claims that Kiyomori once shot an arrow at a fox during a hunt. The fox then transformed into a woman who promised to grant Kiyomori whatever he wanted in exchange for her life. Kiyomori, realizing this woman is none other than the goddess Kiko Tennō (貴狐天王, lit. "Venerable Fox Deva-King", i.e. Dakiniten), spared her life. He subsequently became a devotee of the goddess, despite his awareness that the benefits obtained through the Dakiniten rite (吒天の法, Daten no hō) would not be passed on to his progeny. The story thus attributes both Kiyomori's rise in power and the subsequent fall of his clan to his performance of the Dakiniten ritual.

== Cultural references ==
Taira no Kiyomori is the main character in the Kamakura period epic, the Tale of Heike.

The Daiei Film production of Kenji Mizoguchi's 1955 film Shin Heike Monogatari (variously translated as Taira Clan Saga, Tales of the Taira Clan, and The Sacrilegious Hero) credits its story as "from the novel by Yoshikawa Eiji", which in turn is a 1950 retelling of the 14th-century epic The Tale of the Heike. The opening introduction to the film, in its English subtitles, is

Japan, in the Tenth and Eleventh centuries, was virtually controlled by the Fujiwara clan. But in the Twelfth century, Fujiwara influence began to wane, partly due to the double-monarchy. An Emperor would abdicate but continue to rule from behind the scenes. Thus there was an Imperial Court and an ex-Emperor's Cloister Court, both emperors being descended from the Sun Goddess. Inevitably, there was conflict between the courts. Both began to depend on the warriors, the samurai. Until then, Fujiwara rule had involved little bloodshed. Some monasteries also had their own armies. The monasteries used them to intimidate both courts. Big landowners paid no taxes. Piracy and banditry increased. The Cloister Court attempted to restore order using the warriors of the samurai Taira Clan. Thus were sown the seeds of military governments which dominated Japan for 700 years [i.e., until 1868]. This story begins in 1137, in Kyoto, ancient capital of Japan.

Unlike most other tellings, Mizoguchi's film includes only the story of Taira no Kiyomori's youth, depicting him as a heroic character, particularly in breaking the power of the tyrannical armed monks and their palanquin shrines, where he says at his father's grave "Father, with two arrows from my bow I destroyed a superstition that gripped men for centuries. The courtiers and priests have tried to have me for blasphemy. But others have supported me, more than I expected. Some of them are lords, too. Father, a greater battle lies ahead. But I remain undaunted. No matter how I am beaten, I shall rise again". The film then ends with Kiyomori approaching an alfresco Fujiwara dance, vowing to himself, "Dance, my Lords, dance. Your end is near. Tomorrow will be ours!"

Taira no Kiyomori was featured by 19th-century woodblock print artists as an exemplar of guilt and retribution, see the accompanying print by Yoshitoshi. The famous print generally known as The Vision of Kiyomori by Utagawa Hiroshige depicts the actor Nakamura Utayemon IV in the character of Kiyomori, confronted by the horrific vision of his snow-filled garden transformed into the heaped bones and skulls of his slaughtered enemies.

In video games, Kiyomori appears in Warriors Orochi 2, 3 and 4 fighting for Orochi's army and using prayer beads as weapons. He also makes an appearance in Dynasty Warriors Strikeforce, as a boss in one of the game's Crossover Missions. Additionally, he is the main antagonist in Harukanaru Toki no Naka De 3.

Kiyomori also features prominently as a sympathetic villain in Osamu Tezuka's Phoenix series in the first half of the ninth volume, Turbulent Times (retitled Civil War in English), another Genpei War epic. Like most villains in the series he desires the titular bird for its immortality granting blood, due to his desire to continue to lead and protect the Taira clan and lack of confidence in his successors, but winds up being tricked into buying an imported peacock instead.

A character named Lord Kiyomori appears in Book 6, "The Lords of the Rising Sun" in the Fabled Lands adventure gamebook series, where he is portrayed as the Imperial Sovereign Takakura's chancellor, and on the verge of war with the self-proclaimed shogun by the name of "Yoritomo".

The 2012 NHK Taiga drama was about him.

== Family ==
Father: Taira no Tadamori
Mother: Gion no Nyogo (d. 1147)
Concubine: Taira no Tokiko
Children:

- Taira no Shigemori
- Taira no Munemori
- Taira no Tomomori
- Taira no Tokuko
- Taira no Shigehira

== Honours ==
- Junior First Rank (11 February 1167)

== See also ==
- Taira no Shigemori
- Shishigatani incident
- Fukuhara-kyō
- Itsukushima Shrine
- Siege of Shirakawa-den

== Sources ==
- Bathgate, Michael (2004). The Fox's Craft in Japanese Religion and Culture: Shapeshifters, Transformations, and Duplicities. Taylor & Francis. ISBN 978-1-135-88391-1.
- Faure, Bernard (2015b). Protectors and Predators: Gods of Medieval Japan, Volume 2. University of Hawaii Press. ISBN 978-0-8248-5772-1.
- Smyers, Karen Ann (1999). The Fox and the Jewel: Shared and Private Meanings in Contemporary Japanese Inari Worship. University of Hawaii Press. ISBN 978-0-8248-2058-9.
