= Suitengū =

Japanese Shinto shrines

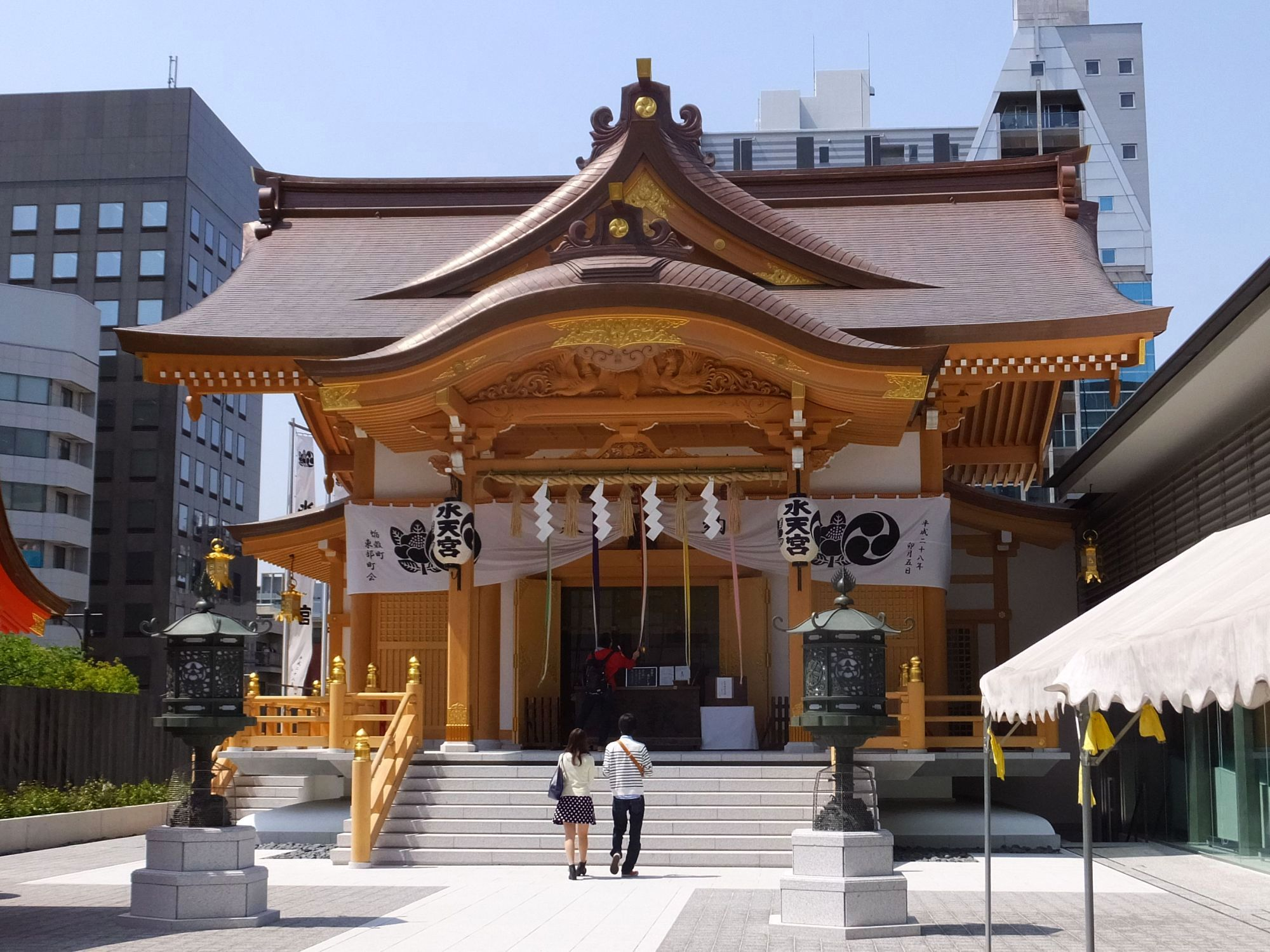
Suiten shrine in Tokyo

Suiten-gū (水天宮) is the name of numerous Shinto shrines in Japan. Suiten-gū shrines are famous for their blessings of safe childbirth, but are also known to provide protection from water-related natural disasters, protection from fire, and aid in childrearing. The head shrine is the Suiten-gū in Kurume city, Fukuoka, which also enshrines members of the Taira clan. The Tokyo Suiten-gū is also known as a patron of Mizu shōbai workers.

== List of shrines ==
- Kurume Suitengū in Kurume, Fukuoka Prefecture
- Suitengū (Tokyo) in Chūō, Tokyo
- Kobe Suitengū in Kobe, Hyogo Prefecture
