= Suitengū (Kurume) =

Shinto shrine in Kurume, Fukuoka Prefecture

Suitengū 水天宮
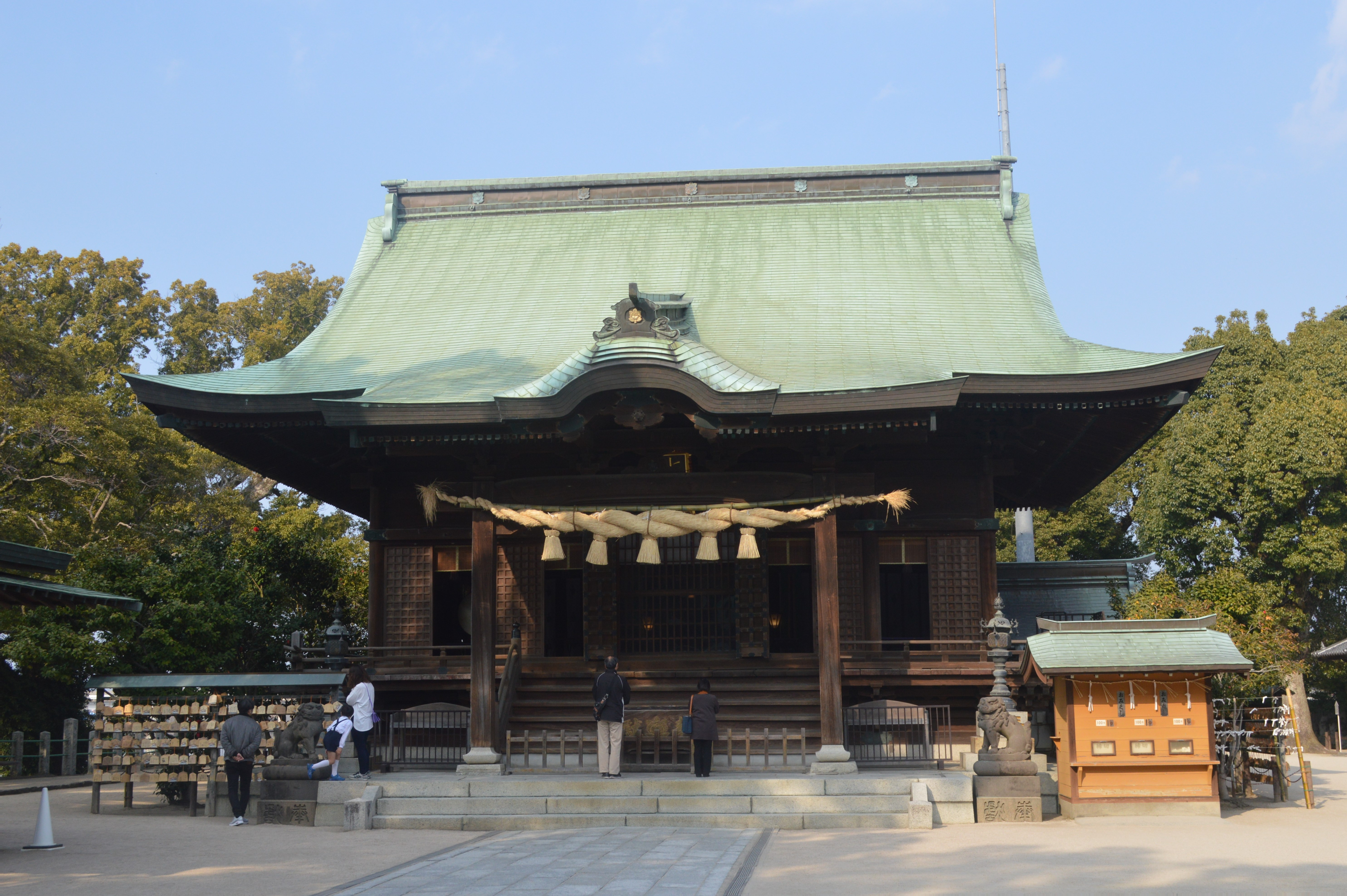
- The honden, or main shrine

- Location within Japan

Religion
- Affiliation: Shinto
- Deity: Amenominakanushi; Emperor Antoku; Taira no Tokuko; Taira no Tokiko

Location
- Location: 265, Senoshita-machi Kurume; Fukuoka 830-0025
- Coordinates: 33°19′13″N 130°29′46″E

Website
- www.suitengu.net

Suitengū (水天宮) is a Shinto shrine located in Kurume, Fukuoka prefecture, Japan. This shrine is the headquarters for all Suitengū Shrines in Japan.

It is dedicated to four deities:

- Amenominakanushi
- Antoku
- Kenrenmon-in
- Nii No Ama

"Suiten" is the Japanese name of the deity of Hindu origins Varuna, one of a series of Hindu deities whose worship entered Japan together with Buddhism.. When the Japanese Empire enforced the Shinbutsu bunri, the official separation of Shinto shrines and Buddhist temples, shrines celebrating Suiten identified their dedication to Amenominakanushi.

== Legends ==
As a shrine related with water, Suitengū came to be venerated as a guardian shrine for marine traffic and was said to have a connection with the legend of Kappa. These days, it is believed to house the god of safe childbirth.

== See also ==
- Suijin
- Suitengū (Tokyo)
- List of Shinto shrines
