= Hebo =

God of the Yellow River

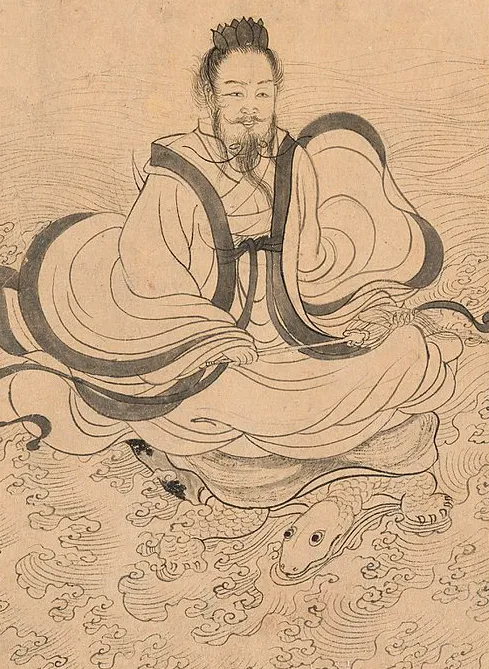
- Hebo as depicted in the Nine Songs, imprint from presumably the 14th century
- Chinese: 河伯
Transcriptions
Standard Mandarin
- Hanyu Pinyin: Hébó
- IPA: [xɤ̌.pwǒ]
Yue: Cantonese
- Yale Romanization: Hòhbaak
- Jyutping: Ho4-baak3
- IPA: [hɔ˩.pak̚˧]
Southern Min
- Hokkien POJ: Hô-peh

Hebo (Chinese: 河伯; lit. 'Lord of the River'), also known as Bingyi (冰夷), is the god of the Yellow River (Huang He). The Yellow River is the main river of northern China, one of the world's major rivers and a river of great cultural importance in China. This is reflected in Chinese mythology by the tales surrounding the deity Hebo.

The descriptive term Hebo is not the deity's only name, and his worship is geographically widespread. Some of the character ascribed to Hebo is related to the character of the Yellow River itself: a river that has been described as one of China's greatest assets as well as one of the greatest sources of sorrow. Some of the world's greatest floods accompanied by massive loss of human life have been due to the Yellow River overflowing its banks and even shifting course and establishing a new river bed. The Yellow River has also been one of the major agricultural sources for irrigation of farms that have provided for the dietary needs of the population at least from the cradle of Chinese civilization through the present day.

To some extent, the deity Hebo is a personification of the character of the Yellow River. However, Hebo has also had an important role in the history of religious worship in China (especially North China) and also having a more general function in terms of Chinese culture, including literature and poetry.

In the poem "Heavenly Questions" in the Chu Ci anthology, it is recorded: "The Emperor sent Hou Yi to reform the people of Xia. Why did he shoot Hebo and take his wife Luoshen?" The poem tells the story of Hòu Yì, a legendary archer who was sent by the Emperor to reform the people of Xia. He was a skilled archer and hunter, and he used his skills to rid the world of many monsters and pests. However, he also became arrogant and tyrannical, and he eventually killed Hebo and took his wife Luoshen as his own. Thus, Luoshen is considered to be the wife of Hebo.

== Etymology ==
The character, Hé (河) may be used somewhat generically to refer to rivers in general or to various particular flowing bodies of water. In the case of Hebo, it is particularly and primarily associated with the Yellow River of China.

The contemporary meaning of Bó (伯) is generally considered to be that of an honorific title, of a martial or noble designation, similar to the European titles of nobility rendered in English as "count" or "earl". It also means uncle, as in one’s father’s oldest brother.

== Character ==
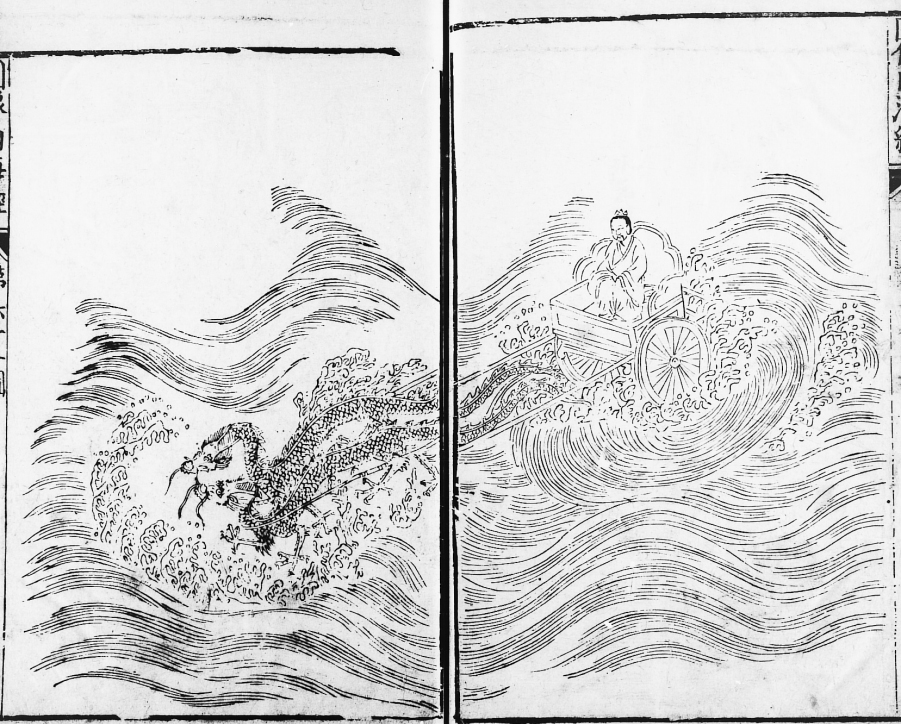
Hebo as depicted in the Classic of Mountains and Seas, 1597 edition

Hebo is the god of the Yellow River, one of the world's major rivers with close association to Chinese culture. Reflecting the personification of the Yellow River, Hebo has been regarded as benevolent, but also greedy, unpredictable, and dangerously destructive.

The Jin scholar Guo Pu commented that early illustrations depicted Hebo on his chariot—pulled by two dragons through the clouds—riding in all directions. In the "Nine Songs" from the Songs of Chu, the performer narrates a wedding journey with him in a chariot drawn by two dragons. Some early accounts—such as the Shizi wherein he bestowed the River Diagram to Yu the Great—describes Hebo as having a white face of a human with the body of a fish.

The poem "Questions of Heaven" alludes to a myth about Yi shooting Hebo. The Han commentator Wang Yi annotated it with the following story:

Lord of the River transformed himself into a white dragon and was traveling alongside the river when Yi the Archer saw him and shot an arrow at him, hitting his left eye. Lord of the River complained to the Supreme God of Heaven, Di, and said, "Kill Yi to avenge me!" The Supreme God asked "Why were you struck by an arrow?" and he answered, "I had transformed myself into a white dragon and was traveling about." The Supreme God stated "If you had only dedicated yourself to carrying out your duties as a god, how would Yi have transgressed? Now you became a beast and it is natural that someone would shoot at you. Yi acted properly, so what crime has he committed?"

The Huainanzi stated that Houyi had shot Hebo for the latter had drowned people.

A chapter of the Zhuangzi mentions Hebo visiting the northern sea, where Ruo—the God of the Sea—resides, beginning with the following:

The time of the autumn floods came, and the hundred streams poured into the Yellow River. Its racing current swelled to such proportions that, looking from bank to bank or island to island, it was impossible to distinguish a horse from a cow. Then the Lord of the River was beside himself with joy, believing that all the beauty in the world belonged to him alone. Following the current, he journeyed east until at last he reached the North Sea. Looking east, he could see no end to the water. The Lord of the River began to wag his head and roll his eyes. Peering far off in the direction of Ruo, he sighed and said: "The common saying has it, 'He has heard the Way a mere hundred times, but he thinks he's better than anyone else.' It applies to me. In the past, I heard men belittling the learning of Confucius and making light of the righteousness of Bo Yi, though I never believed them. Now, however, I have seen your unfathomable vastness. If I hadn't come to your gate, I should have been in danger. I should forever have been laughed at by the masters of the Great Method!"

== Historical worship ==
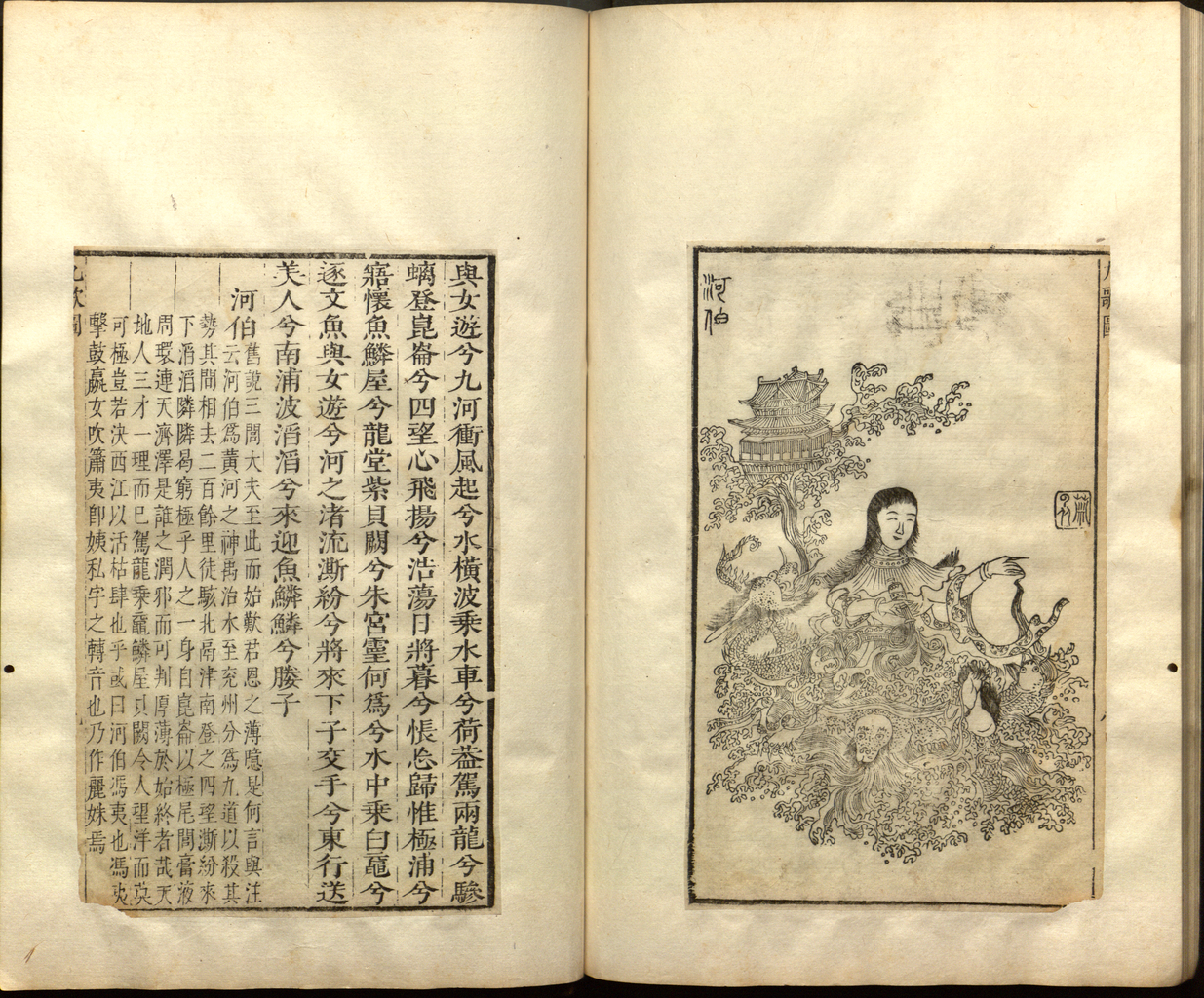
Hebo as depicted by Xiao Yuncong in the Lisao (離騷), imprint of 1645

The Yellow River is believed to have originated at the mythological Mount Kunlun, leading to a cult to Hebo within the ancient states of northwestern and central China before spreading southward.

Hebo was worshiped at various times as an object of human sacrifice and as a figure in the imperial cult. Hebo has been said to have helped Yu the Great to end the Great Flood of China, by providing a map of the Yellow River. Animals as well as humans have been drowned in the river as sacrifices, including young women destined to become the god's wives. The oracle bone inscriptions provide solid evidence of the sacrificial worship of Hebo during the Shang dynasty. Human sacrifice seems to have continued into the Warring States period, prominently featuring the presentation of a virgin female human bride, floated on a bridal raft upon the surface of the river, as an offering to Hebo. This practice was apparently ended (at the Ye shamanic college) by scholar-official Ximen Bao. However, other bridal sacrifices continued elsewhere, until the time of Shi Huangdi, of Qin state. The Zhuangzi stated that the wu-shamans and zhu-priests—who were in charge of the rituals—considered oxen with white foreheads, pigs with turned-up snouts, and humans with piles as unsuitable for offerings.

There were cases where people drowned horses and cast valuables into the river as sacrifices. During the Han dynasty, occasional sacrifices of jade objects, together with a live horse, are recorded.

== Culture ==
Hebo is one of the main characters in the cast of Jiu Ge, the Nine Songs, a work anthologized in the ancient poetic source Chu Ci. The Jiu Ge lyrics, including the "Hebo" section seem to have originally been a lyrical part an ancient religious dramatic performance which also included costuming, choreography, musical accompaniment, and other features, which, unlike the lyrics themselves, failed to survive the vicissitudes of history. Of the deities specified therein, Hebo is the one who has had the most mainstream cultural appeal.

== In popular culture ==
- Hebo is one of the selectable gods in the video game Age of Mythology's Tale of the Dragon expansion.
- Hebo is a playable mage in the MOBA SMITE.

== See also ==
- Chinese mythology
- Habaek - Korean god of the Amnok (Yalu) River which took heavy inspirations from Hebo.
- Kawa-no-Kami - Also known as Kahaku. Japanese god of rivers which took heavy inspirations from Hebo.
- Ximen Bao
- Yellow River Map
