= Varuni =

Intoxicating drink and its personification

- Personification of alcoholic beverages and intoxication
- Other names: Sura, Madira
- Affiliation: Deva (according to the Ramayana); Asuras (according to the Bhagavata Purana)
- Texts: Ramayana, Mahabharata, Harivamsha, Bhagavata Purana, Padma Purana
- Gender: Female

Genealogy
- Parents: Father: Varuna; Mother: Jyeshtha (daughter of Shukra)
- Siblings: Bala (brother)

Varuni (Sanskrit: वारुणी, romanized: Vāruṇī) is the goddess-personification of alcoholic beverages and intoxication in Hinduism. The drink named Varuni is generally described as a fragrant wine made from date palm, but the goddess Varuni is associated with all intoxicating beverages. Commonly described as the daughter of Varuna (the god of water) and his wife Jyeshtha, Varuni emerges during the Samudra Manthana (churning of the ocean), bringing the drink with herself and chooses the companionship of either the Devas or the Asuras, depending on the text. In the Vaishnava tradition, Varuni as the intoxication-goddess is depicted offering wine to the deity Balarama.

The term Varuni is also sometimes used to denote to Varuna's wife. When both a wife and a daughter of Varuna are attested in a text, they are distinguished by naming conventions: when the daughter—who is the goddess of wine—is referred to as Varuni, the wife is called Varunani; and when the wife is named Varuni, the daughter is called by the common term for liquor—Surā. In the goddess orient Shakta sect of Hinduism, Varuni is also the name of a Matrika—personification of Varuna's energy.

== Beverage ==
In its earliest and literal sense, Varuni (Vāruṇī) denotes a type of strong, spirituous liquor. According to traditional lexicons and classical commentaries, Varuni is a fermented beverage typically prepared from the sap or juice of the date palm (Phoenix sylvestris) and the palmyra palm (Borassus flabellifer). It is considered more potent and prized than sura, a rice-based liquor, and is referred to in texts such as the Varuṇi Jātaka as a superior form of alcohol.

The Madanapāla Nighaṇṭu (varga 8.170) and the Bhaṭṭa Nṛsiṃha’s commentary on the Bṛhat-Saṃhitā detail the preparation of Varuni using ground śāli rice and the medicinal plant punarnavā (Boerhavia diffusa), a root commonly used in Ayurvedic formulations. Other references, such as Sarngadhara Samhita (2.10.7ab), confirm that Varuni is made by fermenting the juice of tāla and kharjūra trees.

Texts like the Aṣṭāṅga Hṛdaya Sūtrasthāna (5.68) further distinguish Varuni as the upper, transparent portion—or scum—of surā, identifying it synonymously with prasanna. This version is also known as śvetasurā, or "white liquor", in later interpretations. However, some commentators, contest this and argue that vāruṇī is a distinct preparation involving punarnavā roots and rice flour, separate from the refined filtrate of surā.

== Goddess ==
In addition to being a fermented beverage, Varuni is personified in post-Vedic Hindu literature—Itihasa-Puranas—as a goddess associated with all kinds of liquor and intoxicating bliss. She is most commonly described as the daughter of Varuna, the deity of the waters, though in some texts she is identified instead as his consort, rather than daughter. When both figures are mentioned, the wine-personified Varuni is usually the daughter, while the wife is known as Varunani. However, the wife is sometimes also endowed with wine-related attributes and referred to as Varuni, while the daughter may be referred to as Surā—another type of alcoholic beverage.

Another variation records that Varuni joins Ananta, the serpent king sometimes identified with Balarama, the brother of Krishna, who is traditionally associated with wine.

In some sources, the goddess is referred to as Madira, a generic term for liquor in Sanskrit literature. Although it is uncertain whether this Madira is identical with Surā/Varuni, the association reflects a fluid mythological identity centered around the feminine personification of alcohol. The Arthashastra, for instance, mentions a goddess named Madira as one of the tutelary deities established in fortified cities, indicating a ritual dimension to her worship.

=== Varuna's daughter ===
In the Ramayana, Bhagavata Purana, and various Puranas, Varuni is the name of Varuna's daughter. In the Mahabharata, instead of Varuni, the term Sura is used for Varuna's daughter. Her puranic origins are rooted in the Samudra Manthana ("churning of the ocean"), a foundational episode described in these texts.

During the churning of the ocean—undertaken by both the gods and anti-gods to retrieve the elixir of immortality (Amrita)—a series of divine treasures emerged. Among them was the drink Sura, carried by a goddess. In the Mahabharata, the goddess Sura with the drink arises alongside other celestial entities such as Sri (goddess of fortune), Chandra (the moon), and the divine horse Ucchaishravas. These beings follow the solar path to the gods, signifying divine acceptance. A separate passage in the Mahabharata provides genealogical context: Sura is identified as the daughter of Varuna and Jyeshtha, and the sister of Bala, with her maternal grandfather being Shukra—a sage later associated with prohibitions on liquor.

In the Ramayana, the goddess is specifically named Varuni and described as the daughter of Varuna, the deity of cosmic waters. She is presented as seeking acceptance from both the anti-gods and gods, but is rejected by the former and accepted by the latter. This distinction becomes etymologically significant: those who accept Sura (the goddess and the drink) become Suras (gods), while those who reject her become Asuras (anti-gods). At this point in mythic chronology, there is no moral stigma attached to Varuni; she remains a divine gift and a symbol of celestial pleasure.

Later Puranic texts, including the Bhagavata Purana, depict a variant of this episode. After the goddess Sri chooses Vishnu, the disheartened Asuras are said to accept Varuni, described here as a "lotus-eyed maiden." Their acceptance of her, with the consent of Vishnu, reinforces their subordinate status—receiving a lesser reward. In this version, Varuni becomes a consolation for the defeated Asuras, and her acceptance by them implies a growing ambivalence toward the consumption of intoxicants.

== Other Goddesses of the Same Name ==
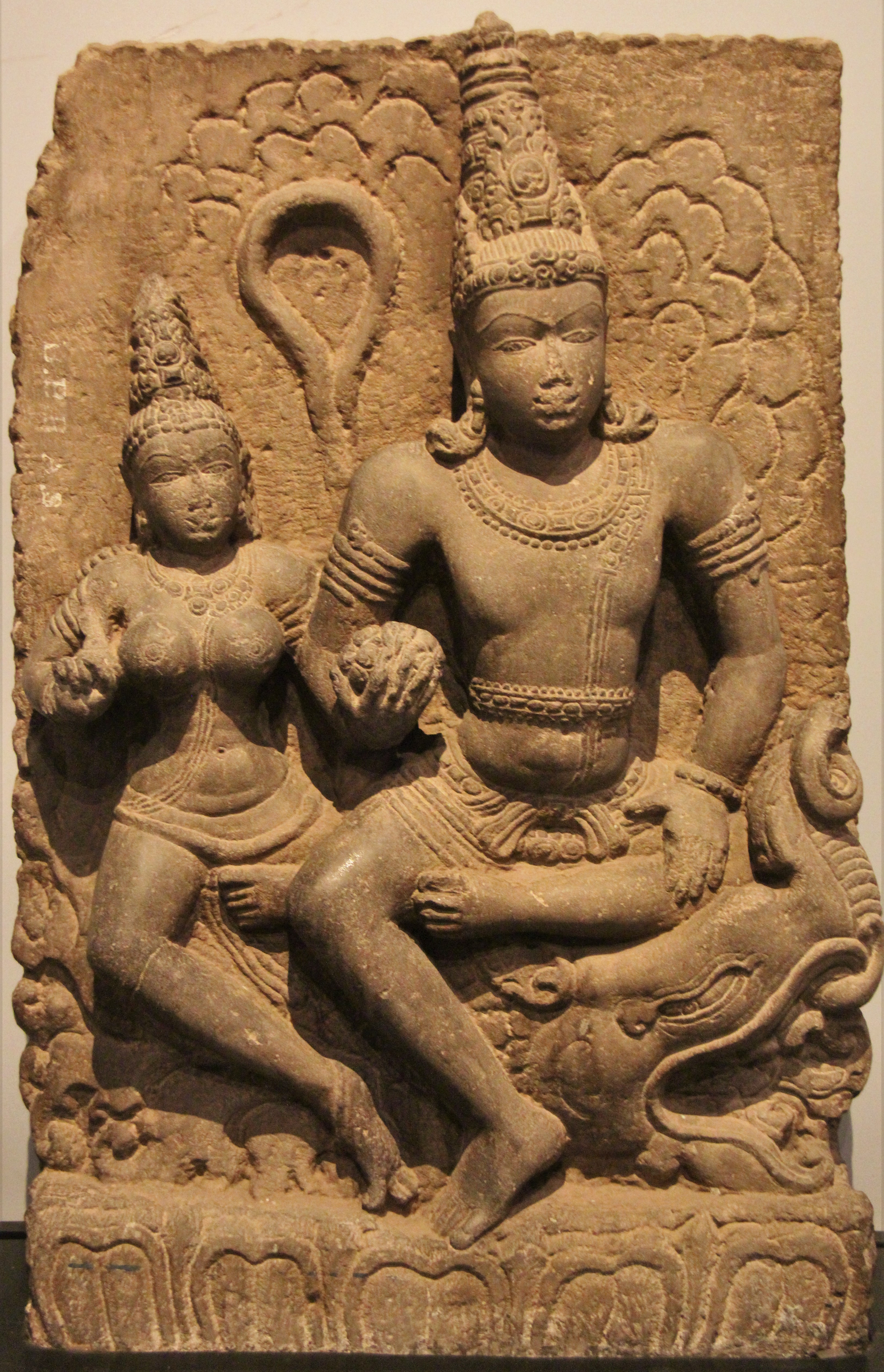
A sculpture of Varunani (left) with her consort Varuna

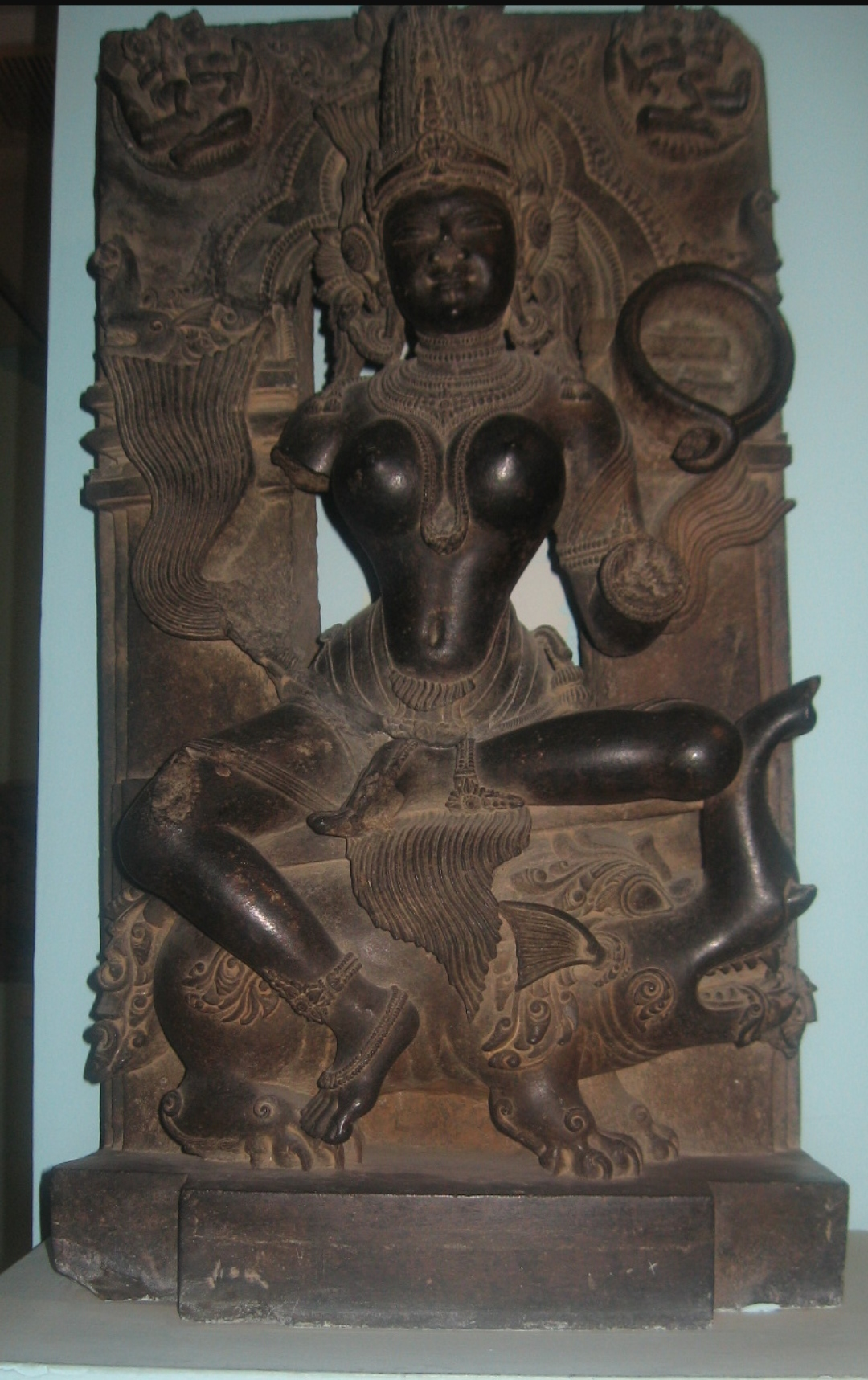
A 13th-century sculpture of Matrika Varuni.

=== Varuna's wife ===
The name Varuni has been instead used for Varuna's queen in the Mahabharata. According to the Mahabharata, she resides alongside Varuna in his underwater palace. In the very same text, Varuna's wife is also called Jyeshtha and Gauri, though there is no confirmation if the three are the same. The text only presents her a queen, and the wine-related goddess is named Sura instead—who is the daughter of Varuna with Jyeshtha, as stated above. Elsewhere, in most texts, Varuna's queen is called Varunani, instead of Varuni.

=== Matrika ===
The third goddess is a Matrika found in Matsya Purana. She is the physical feminine manifestation of the shakti divine energy of Varuna. As per the story, she was created to drink the blood of a demon Andhaka. She is also one of the 64 yogini(s).
