= Kawa-no-Kami =

- King of the river gods
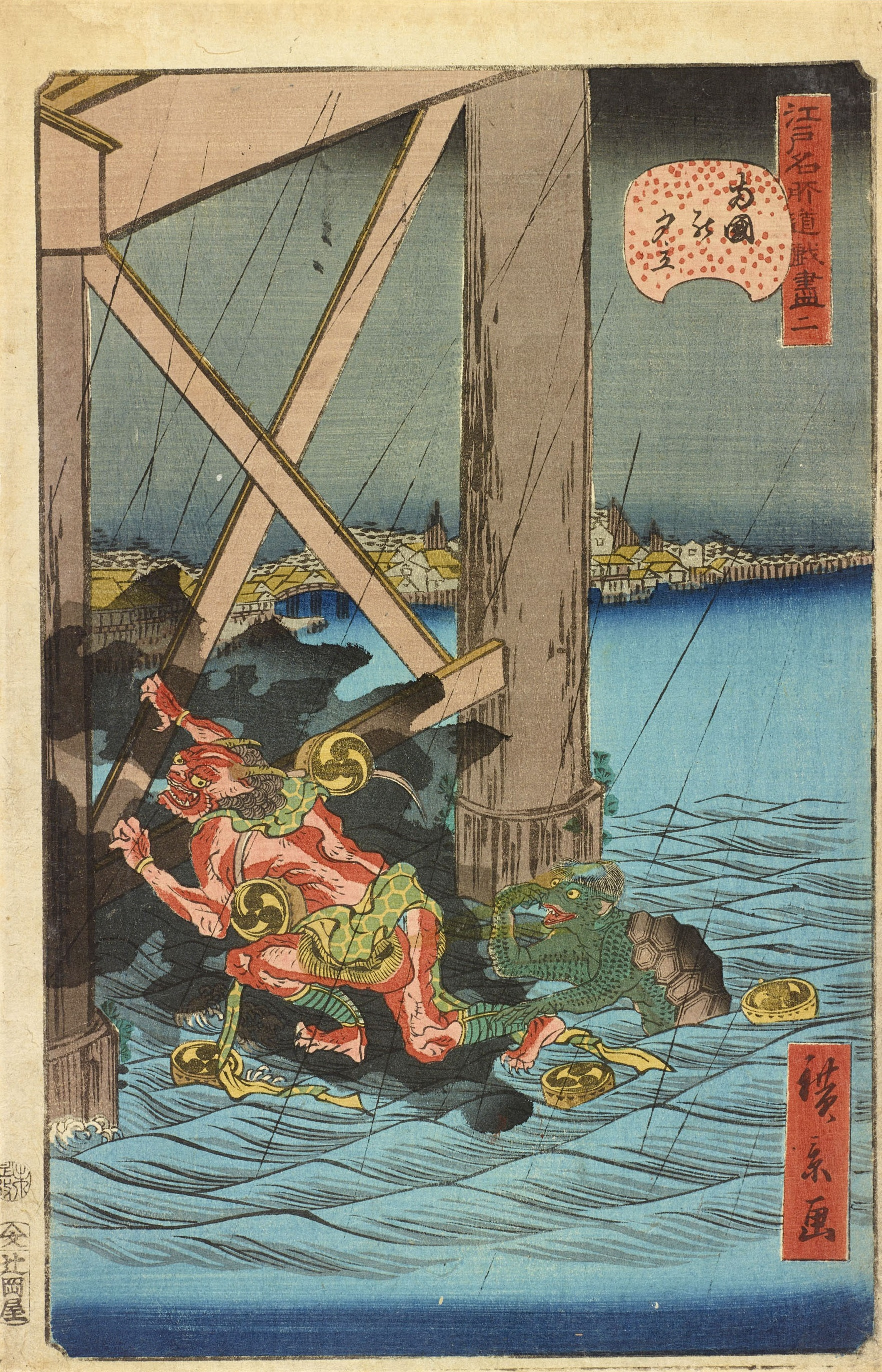
- A Raijin escaping from a river god, represented by a Kappa
- Other names: Kahaku (河伯)
- Kanji: 河の神 川之神
- Gender: Male
- Region: Japan

Kawa-no-Kami (河の神 or 川之神), also known as Kahaku (河伯) is a river deity in Japanese mythology. He is king of the river gods.

The line with this, kami is not mentioned in classical text. The Man'yōshū does however, include poems indicating that Kawa-no-Kami serves the emperor. Kawa-no-Kami is also mentioned in the Nihon Shoki. In other iterations, Kappas are a representation of him.

== Etymology ==
The god goes by the name "Kawa-no-Kami". It is also known as "Kahaku", a name that is believed to be inspired by the Chinese god of the Yellow River, Hebo. Both names are considered generic terms for a god of rivers or streams. The same is applicable to Korea's Habaek (see Habaek's etymology).

== Worship ==
Many sources show that people offered human sacrifice to Kawa-no-Kami. In earlier times, when rivers were in flood, people would offer human sacrifice to please Kawa-no-Kami. With the introduction of Buddhism this practice ended. This led people to use dolls made of flowers or straw as offerings to Kawa-no-Kami instead. This is still practiced today in some parts of Japan.

== In popular culture ==
Kawa-no-Kami is a minor character in the 2001 animated movie Spirited Away. There is a scene where Kawa-no-Kami goes to the bath house. He is filled with trash which gives him the appearance of a stinking spirit. This led staff to be hesitant to clean him. When Chihiro is asked to clean Kawa-no-Kami, she discovers something sticking out of Kawa-no-Kami's side. She decides to pull it out. The other staff then helps Chihiro when they realize he is not a stinking spirit but a river spirit filled with pollutants. Many have said the scene represents themes about environmental issues.

== See also ==
- Habaek - Korean god of the Amnok (Yalu) River which took heavy inspirations from Hebo.
- Hebo - Chinese god of the Yellow River which Kawa-no-Kami took heavy inspirations from.
- Suijin - The god of water in Japanese mythology.
