= Suijin =

Shinto god of water in Japan

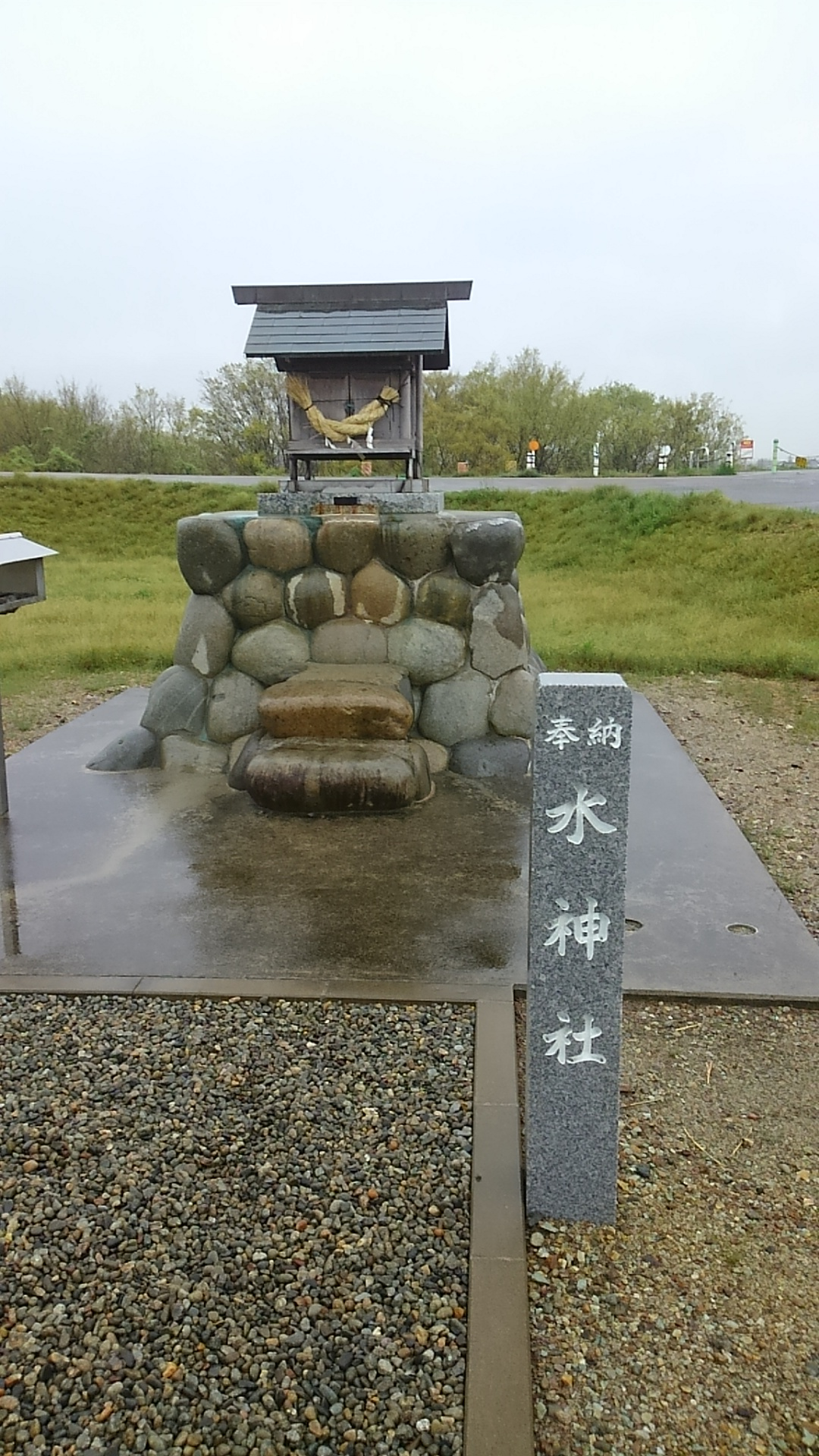
An altar to Suijin, located along the Kiso River

Suijin or Mizugami (水神, すいじん, みずがみ; lit. "water god/deity") is a general name for the god of water in Japanese mythology. The term refers to the heavenly and earthly manifestations of the benevolent Shinto divinity of water (mainly freshwater), as well as to a wide variety of mythical and magical creatures found in lakes, ponds, springs, and wells, including serpents (snakes, dragons, eels, fish, turtles), and the flesh-eating kappa. Mizu-no-kamisama, Mizugami, or Suijin is popularly revered and worshipped in temples and continues to influence Japanese culture. Other names of Suijin include Suiten (水天; lit. "water heaven") and Suiō (水王; lit. "water lord/king").

Suijin is often conflated with Ryūjin, the Japanese dragon god associated with water. Fudō Myōō is sometimes called "Suijin" because of his believed association with waterfalls. Suijin appears as a stone plaque or even a small stone set upright near the emergence of a spring.

== Worship ==
The Shinto water god is believed to be the guardian of fishermen and the patron saint of fertility, motherhood, and painless childbirth. People worship Suijin with offerings, believing that doing so will ensure pure and unpolluted water for drinking, agriculture, and sanitation, and will bring success in fishing trips, fertility, motherhood, and easy childbirth. Shrines devoted to the worship of the Water God are called Suitengū Shrines.

There are several numbers of shrines in Japan associated with deities. An example of this is the Horse God in Kurume, Fukuoka, the main shrine for all Suitengū Shrines in Japan. This shrine is visited by pregnant women who wish to ensure a safe and easy birth for their children. Another famous Suitengū Shrine is the Tsukiji Suijin Shrine, located near the Tsukiji fish market in Tokyo, which was built to protect and watch over the fishermen and their businesses.

Suijin is widely worshipped at Suitengū Shrines throughout Japan through votive stone markers devoted to the Water God. Most of these stone markers can be found enshrined at dikes, agricultural irrigation canals, rice paddy fields, mountain springs, regular springs, streams, rivers, wells, household wells, and even inside sewage water and septic tanks. When a Suijin stone marker is enshrined at mountain springs that form sources for agricultural waterways, it is often labelled as "water distributing god" (kumari no kami 水分神), in which case it may also be associated with the god of the mountain (Yama no kami 山の神).

=== Festivals ===
There are many Japanese festivals dedicated to the water god, most of which occur during summer and winter, though more emphasis is placed on summer festivals. The majority of summer festivals occur at the Yasaka Shrine in Kyoto and the Tsushima Shrine in Tsushima. These observances have a significant role in the exorcism of bad spirits and purification, primarily aimed at dangerous epidemics, diseases and natural and man-made water-related disasters which commonly happen during the summer.

List of festivals worshipping Suijin (this list may not include all festivals):

- Suijin Matsuri, December 1 and June 15 — On these days in Japan, various locations hold the Suijin Matsuri, a Shinto celebration and ceremony to honour the god of water.
- Kamakura Matsuri, Akita Prefecture, around February 15–17 — Igloos (called "Kamakura") are built with a small alcove inside dedicated to Suijin, who is honoured during this festival to ensure good crops in the coming year. This festival is over 400 years old.
- Suijin-sai, Funabashi Fishing Harbour (Chiba), April 3 — A festival to pray for good fishing hauls and safety at sea. All fishing boats from the area gather in the harbour and a Kagura ritual (sacred Shinto music and dance), dedicated to the god of the sea, is performed onboard each vessel. A ritual existing since the Edo Period, the festival is called Futuna-sai for short.
- Suitengū Spring Festival, Kurume City (Fukuoka), May 3–5 — This annual festival, held at the Suitengū Shrine in Kurume City, is reportedly over 800 years old. Participants pray for safe and easy childbirth, for protection from drowning, and ask for the safety and health of children. This festival is also held at other Suitengū sites in Japan on May 5. Another major festival in Kurume City is the Water Festival, which takes place from August 3 to 5.
- Okinohata Suitengu Festival, Yanagawa (Fukuoka), May 3–5 — Held on the canal by the shrine for three days and nights, drawing about 30,000 total visitors. Many pray for their children to be protected from drowning.
- Gion Festival, near Tsukuba (Ibaraki), around July 25 — The Anniversary feast of Suijin-gū Shrine of Tsuchiura City (Ibaraki). Water is splashed over the portable shrine.

== See also ==
- River gods (Greek mythology)
- Kawa-no-Kami
