= Suitengū (Tokyo) =

Suiten-gū 水天宮
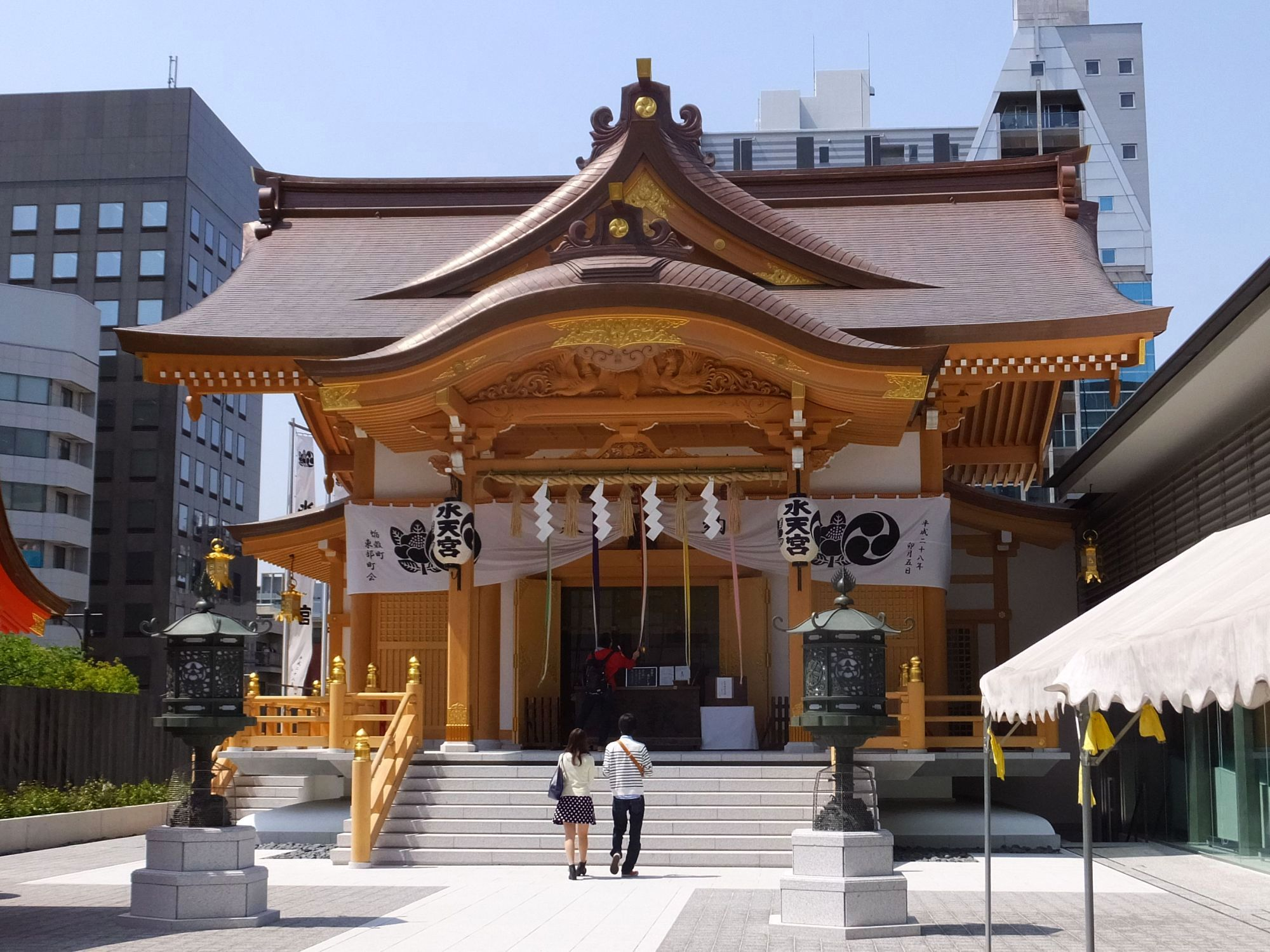
- The current shrine (Rebuilt in 2016)

- Location within Japan

Religion
- Affiliation: Shinto; Japanese Buddhism
- Deity: Amenominakanushi（as Varuna） Emperor Antoku; Taira no Tokuko; Taira no Tokiko

Location
- Location: 2-4-1 Nihonbashi-Kakigarachō, Chūō; Tokyo 103-0014
- Coordinates: 35°41′01″N 139°47′06″E

Architecture
- Established: 1818

Website
- www.suitengu.or.jp

Suiten-gū (水天宮), literally "Palace of the Water Deva", or "Palace of Suiten", is a Japanese temple dedicated to four deities of both the Shinto and Buddhist Religions:

- Amenominakanushi
- Antoku
- Kenrenmon-in
- Nii No Ama

"Suiten" is the Japanese name of the deity of Hindu origins Varuna, one of a series of Hindu deities whose worship entered Japan together with Buddhism. (Note: Varuna is one among a number of Hindu deities incorporated into Shinto, introduced into Japan together with Buddhism: Indra (Jap. Taishakuten), Agni (Katen), Yama (Emmaten), Nirrti (Rasetsuten), Vayu (Futen), Ishana (Ishanaten), Kubera (Tamonten), Brahma (Bonten), Prithvi (Chiten), Surya (Nitten), Chandra (Gatten).). When the Japanese Empire enforced the Shinbutsu bunri, the official separation of Shinto shrines and Buddhist temples, shrines celebrating Suiten identified their dedication to Amenominakanushi.

Suitengu is located in Chūō, Tokyo. It is devoted to conception and safe childbirth. In 1818 the ninth daimyō of the Kurume Domain established the Suitengu in Edo as a branch of a shrine of the same name in Kurume, Fukuoka. It was inside the grounds of the domain's mansion in the Mita district of what is now Minato, Tokyo, and the domain opened it to the public on the fifth day of every month. In 1871, the Arima family moved from Mita to Akasaka, taking the shrine with them, and in the following year they moved the shrine to its present location, on a site that had been occupied by one of the family's mansions.

Suitengūmae Station is close to this shrine and takes its name from it. There are about twenty-five other shrines of the same name in Japan.

== See also ==
- Kurume Suitengū
- Suijin
