= Varuna =

Hindu deity associated with water

- Vedic: God of Sky, Order, Truth, Water and Magic Itihasa-Puranic: God of Water, Lakes, Streams, Rivers and Oceans
- Member of Adityas and Dikpala
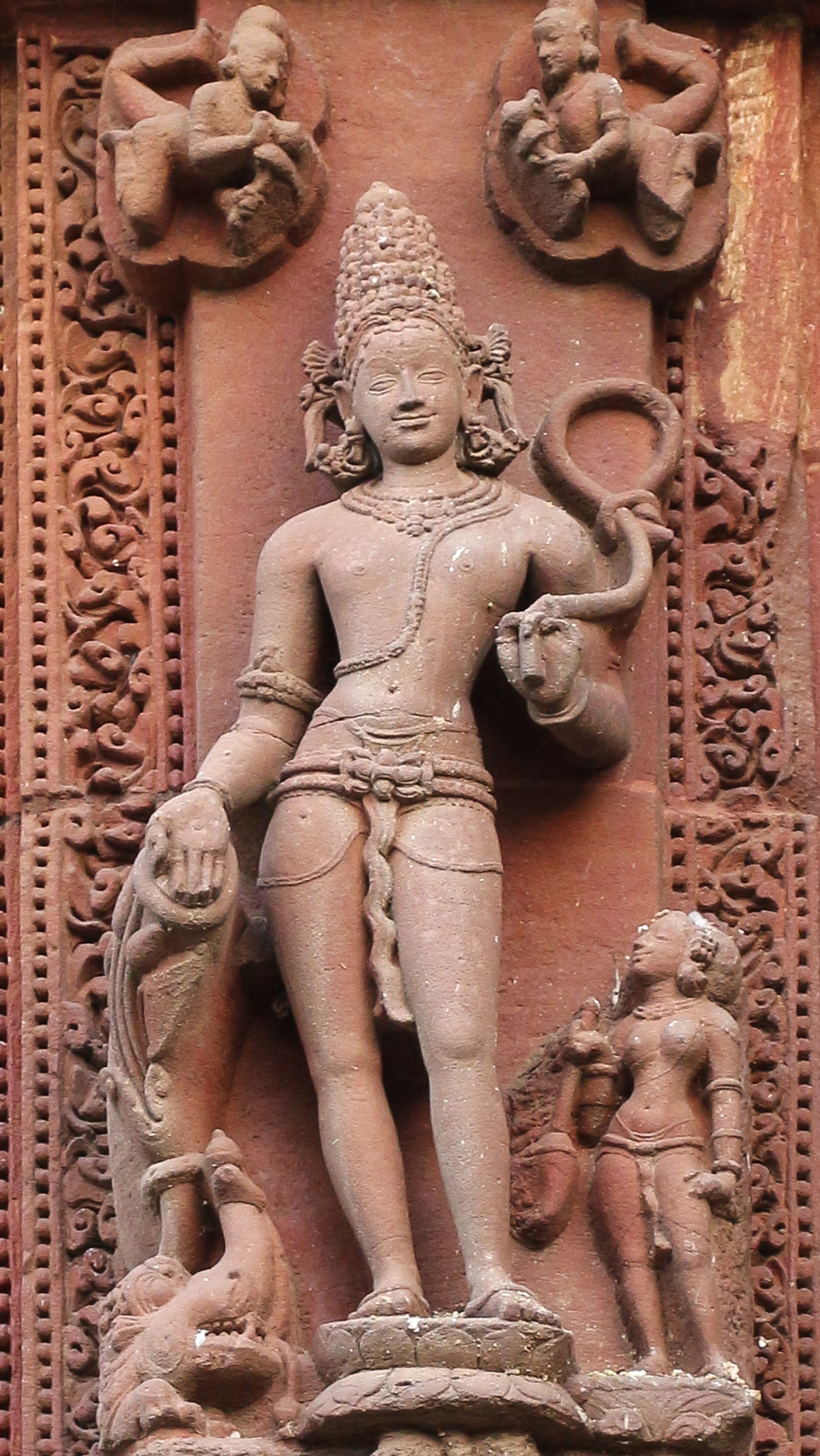
- Sculpture of Varuna at the 11th-century Rajarani Hindu temple.
- Other names: Sindhu; Samudra; Ratnākara
- Affiliation: Vedic: Asuras, Devas, Adityas Itihasa-Puranic: Devas, Adityas, Dikpalas Jhulelal
- Abode: Ocean
- Planet: Neptune
- Mantra: Oṃ jala bimbāya vidmahe nīla puruṣāya dhīmahi tanno varuṇaḥ pracodayāt Oṃ Varunāya Namaḥ
- Weapon: Noose, Varunastra, Gandiva
- Mount: Makara

Genealogy
- Parents: Kashyapa (father); Aditi (mother)
- Spouse: Itihasa-Puranic: Varunani; Gauri; Charshani; Jyeshtha
- Children: Itihasa-Puranic: Bala (son); Varuni or Sura (daughter); Pushkara (son); Vasishtha and Agastya (twin-sons); Go (son); Vandi (son); Sushena (son, a vanara); Shrutayudha (son); Andharmaka (son); Kali (son, Jaya and Vijaya's father); Dakshasavarni Manu (son)

Equivalents
- Greek: Poseidon
- Norse: Njörðr
- Roman: Neptune

Varuna (/ˈvɜːrʊnə, ˈvɑːrə-/; Sanskrit: वरुण, IAST: Varuṇa) is a Hindu god. He is one of the earliest deities in the pantheon, whose role underwent a significant transformation from the Vedic to the Puranic periods. In the early Vedic era, Varuna is seen as the god-sovereign, ruling the sky and embodying divine authority. He is also mentioned as the king of asuras, who gained the status of a deva, serving as the chief of the Adityas, a group of celestial deities. He maintains truth and ṛta, the cosmic and moral order, and was invoked as an omniscient ethical judge, with the stars symbolizing his watchful eyes or spies. Frequently paired with Mitra, Varuna represents the magical and speculative aspects of sovereignty, overseeing the relationship between gods and humans.

The transition from the Vedic to later periods saw Varuna's domain begin to shift from the firmament to waters. He became associated with celestial waters, marking the initial phase of his transformation. By the time of the Itihasa-Purana, Varuna had transformed into the lord of all waters, ruling over oceans, rivers, streams, and lakes. Depicted as residing in a magnificent underwater palace, akin to Poseidon in Greek mythology, he is attended by river goddesses like Ganga and Yamuna. Varuna’s earlier supremacy diminished, and he was relegated to a lesser role as a dikpala, or guardian of the western direction. He is depicted as a youthful man, mounted on Makara (crocodile-like creature) and holding a Pasha (noose, rope loop) and a pitcher in his hands. He is depicted as having multiple wives and children, the most notable of the latter being the sages Vasishtha and Agastya.

Varuna is also mentioned in the Tamil grammar work Tolkāppiyam, as Kadalon (Tamil: கடலோன், romanized: Kaṭalōṉ), the god of sea and rain, and is furthermore present as a deity in Jainism. In Japanese Buddhist myth, Varuna is known as Suiten (水天; lit. "Water Deva") and ranks among the Twelve Devas (Jūniten).

== Etymology ==
In Hindu tradition, the theonym Váruṇa (Devanagari: वरुण) is described as a derivation from the verbal root vṛ ("to surround, to cover" or "to restrain, bind") by means of a suffixal -uṇa-, for an interpretation of the name as "he who covers or binds", in reference to the cosmological ocean or river encircling the world, but also in reference to the "binding" by universal law or Ṛta.

Georges Dumézil (1934) made a cautious case for the identity of Varuna and the Greek god Ouranos at the earliest Indo-European cultural level. The etymological identification of the name Ouranos with the Sanskrit Varuṇa is based in the derivation of both names from the PIE root *ŭer with a sense of "binding" – the Indic king-god Varuṇa binds the wicked, the Greek king-god Ouranos binds the Cyclopes. This derivation of the Greek name is now widely rejected in favour of derivation from the root *wers- "to moisten, drip" (Sanskrit vṛṣ "to rain, pour").

== In Vedas ==
=== Samhita ===
==== Rigveda ====
In the oldest Hindu scripture, Rigveda (c. 1900–1200 BCE), Varuṇa is among the most prominent deities, appearing in numerous hymns, including 1.25, 2.27–30, 7.86–88, 8.8, and 9.73. Despite this frequent mention, he is the central focus of only ten hymns. Varuṇa is portrayed in four principal aspects: as a universal monarch and sovereign of the sky, the upholder of ṛta (cosmic order), a deity associated with water (āpah), and a wielder of māyā (cosmic illusion or creative power).

The Rigveda features Varuna as the god-king of the sky. He is described as a divine king (samraj) with pure strength, abiding in the celestial firmament, where he sustains a radiant mass of light. He is credited with creating the sun’s path and is invoked to dispel suffering, liberate from sin, and shield from evil (nirṛti). His realm includes the movement of constellations and the moon, which obey his divine ordinances. His omniscience is central to his identity: he observes all actions through celestial spies, residing in a thousand-gated palace upon a golden throne—symbols of his pervasive awareness and authority.

In Rigveda 1.25, Varuṇa is praised for his understanding of the paths of birds, the movement of ships and winds, and the secrets of time and space. Hymns characterize him as a sovereign deity, intimately acquainted with both the sacred and the profane. According to Rigveda 10.123, Varuṇa's messenger is described as the Hiraṇyapakṣa (golden-winged bird), interpreted by some as a reference to flamingos, based on their colorful plumage and proximity to aquatic habitats. The vulture is likewise mentioned as a messenger of Yama, suggesting symbolic parallels between the two birds.

Varuṇa's foremost role is as the enforcer of ṛta, the cosmic and moral order that governs both the natural world and human conduct. Hymns such as Rigveda VII.11.1 and II.29.8 present him as a vigilant upholder of truth, who punishes transgressors while showing mercy to the penitent. Ethical instructions against killing, deceit, and gambling are linked with his domain. His ordinances are described as unshakable, akin to a mountain. Concepts closely tied to ṛta—such as vrata (sacred vow) and dharman (duty, law)—are frequently associated with Varuṇa. In this context, vrata implies both divine commands and ethical imperatives, while dharman denotes sacrificial law or moral conduct. Varuṇa is accordingly called Rivan ("guide of moral order") and Pūtadakṣa ("possessor of pure will").

Sin (ṛṇa) is conceptualized as a breach of Varuṇa’s order, often attributed to human frailty. Hymns express remorse not only for individual wrongdoing but also for ancestral transgressions, suggesting a nascent idea of inherited guilt. Despite his role as punisher, Varuṇa is often invoked for forgiveness, protection from evil, and relief from fear and dreams. He is described as both a judge and a healer, bearing “a thousand remedies” alongside weapons to punish sin.

Varuṇa’s association with water is both cosmological and symbolic. He presides over Apah, the primeval waters representing the matrix of creation. Hymns such as Rigveda VII.49.4 describe these waters as celestial and purifying. Varuṇa is also called Sindhu-pati ("lord of the ocean"), sharing this title with Mitra. These waters are the source of the universe, acting as both creative womb and sacred energy. In later Vedic texts, the waters called Viraj are described as Varuṇa’s consorts, representing prakṛti (primordial matter), and Varuṇa himself is termed an Asura, denoting "possessor of māyā" or vital force, without the later demonic connotation.

Varuṇa’s use of māyā—his divine creative power—is a recurring theme in the Rigveda. It refers to his capacity to shape the cosmos and enforce ṛta. Hymns in Mandala VIII describe him as embracing night and measuring the earth with the sun. Through māyā, Varuṇa becomes not only the enforcer of law but also a cosmic architect.

===== Combined descriptions: Mitra–Varuṇa =====
Varuṇa is frequently paired with Mitra in the compound Mitra–Varuṇa, appearing prominently in the Rigveda. Together, they preside over moral and cosmic law, and are associated with ritual, rain, and natural cycles. Both deities are referred to as Asuras (e.g., RV 5.63.3), though also addressed as Devas (e.g., RV 7.60.12), reflecting fluid theological roles. According to myths, Varuna, being the king of the Asuras, was adopted as or made the change to a Deva after the structuring of the primordial cosmos, imposed by Indra after he defeats Vritra.

Mitra–Varuṇa are described as youthful monarchs clad in glistening garments, residing in a golden palace with a thousand pillars and gates. They are lords of rivers, rain, and heavenly order, sending dew and bountiful waters, and punishing falsehood with disease. Their sun is described as their "eye", and their cosmic chariot moves across the sky via solar rays. Possessing divine spies and secret knowledge (māyā́), they maintain ṛta and oversee oaths and societal order. According to myth, the sages Vashistha and Agastya were born from their shared semen, which they deposited into a pitcher after seeing the celestial nymph Urvashi.

Scholar Doris Srinivasan highlights the ambiguous and dualistic nature of Mitra–Varuṇa, comparing it to the Rudra-Shiva pairing. Both Varuṇa and Rudra are described as omniscient guardians, capable of both wrath and grace. In Rigveda 5.70, the Mitra–Varuṇa pair is even called Rudra. According to Samuel Macey and other scholars, Varuna had been the more ancient Indo-Aryan deity in 2nd millennium BCE, who gave way to Rudra in the Hindu pantheon, and Rudra-Shiva became both "timeless and the god of time".

==== Yajuraveda ====
In the Yajurveda (c. 1200 and before 800 BCE), Varuṇa maintains his exalted status as guardian of ṛta and sovereign of the waters. He is portrayed as a moral overseer who casts his noose (pāśa) upon transgressors and is invoked as both judge and healer. His role expands to include health and medicine, and he is referred to as the “patron deity of physicians.” In the Vājasaneyi Saṃhitā (21.40), he is described as possessing “a hundred, a thousand remedies,” echoing earlier Ṛgvedic hymns linking him to herbs and healing. His capacity and association with "all comprehensive knowledge" is also found in the Atharvaveda (~1000 BCE).

Varuṇa resides in celestial waters described as pure, nourishing, and maternal. These waters are identified with Mahatsalilam (the great waters), linked to Aditi—the cosmic mother and creative force. As lord of these waters, Varuṇa becomes a symbol of cosmic law, creation, and protection. The waters not only represent physical phenomena but also the metaphysical substratum of reality.

His association with law and conscience continues through imagery such as the “three bonds” that bind the sinner—interpreted as natural forces like cloud, lightning, and thunder—symbolizing physical and moral consequences. Worshippers pray for release from these bonds and seek reconciliation with ṛta. As in earlier texts, Varuṇa is revered with a mixture of fear and devotion, embodying both justice and mercy.

In Yajurveda 8.59, it is stated: “In fact, Varuṇa is Viṣṇu and Viṣṇu is Varuṇa, and hence the auspicious offering is to be made to these deities.” This reflects theological fluidity in the identification of divine roles and emphasizes Varuṇa’s integration into broader Vedic pantheon.

Ritually, Varuṇa is associated with the west and is offered a black ram with a white foot during sacrifices, symbolizing concealment and dominion over night.

==== Samaveda ====
Though no original verses directly address Varuna in the Samaveda (c. 1200 to 1000 BCE), Rigvedic hymns to him are adapted into Saman melodies, indicating his continued reverence in ritual worship.

==== Atharvaveda ====
In the Atharvaveda (c. 1200–900 BCE), Varuṇa’s portrayal evolves while retaining continuity with earlier depictions. Although scholars such as A.A. Macdonell have suggested that Varuṇa appears here "divested of his powers as a universal ruler," other interpretations challenge this view. Rather than a decline, Varuṇa’s role shifts toward a more metaphysical and moral presence, with water remaining a central element of his identity.

The Atharvavedic waters (āpah) are described as golden-hued, pure, and sacred. They function not only as physical substances but also as the womb of creation, giving rise to deities such as Savitṛ and Agni. These waters embody the principle of becoming, and Varuṇa, as their lord, governs the cosmic processes emerging from them.

One of the most prominent hymns dedicated to Varuṇa is Book IV, Hymn 16, which emphasizes his omniscience and moral surveillance. He is said to possess “spies with a thousand eyes” who descend to observe all human actions. His oversight extends beyond earth and heaven to regions beyond the visible cosmos. The metaphor of Varuṇa controlling the world like a gamester casting dice illustrates his dominion over fate and law.

This hymn also introduces magical and imprecatory themes, consistent with the Atharvaveda’s ritualistic focus. Still, the theological depth remains intact: Varuṇa punishes immorality not out of wrath, but in fulfillment of his cosmic duty to uphold ṛta. His moral authority is depicted as omnipresent and inescapable. Here, Varuṇa's moral authority is reinforced by his role as enforcer of law through spiritual nooses (pāśa) cast upon the wicked.

A notable development in the Atharvaveda is the explicit articulation of Varuṇa’s dual nature as both punisher and forgiver. In Book I, Hymn 10, a priest pleads for the release of a sinner, reflecting the idea that sin can result from ignorance or falsehood and can be absolved through penance. This reveals a sophisticated moral theology, wherein divine grace is attainable through sincere repentance.

Max Müller praised this dualism, viewing Varuṇa as one of the most theologically advanced constructs in early Indo-Aryan religion. Rooted in sky imagery yet imbued with ethical and cosmic dimensions, Varuṇa is both transcendent and intimately connected with human conscience.

Varuṇa is again identified as Māyin—master of māyā, or divine creative power—and called Asura in its original sense of “lord” or “mighty one.” This emphasizes his possession of asu (vital power) and his role as an invisible force guiding the visible world. Yet, his identity as Apām Adhipati—the Lord of Waters—remains constant. The waters, symbolic of purity, healing, and cosmic potential, reinforce his status as a protector of life and order in the Atharvaveda.

=== Brahmanas ===
In the Brahmana texts, Varuna retains his Vedic stature as the sovereign of ṛta (cosmic order) and is especially associated with the moral and ritual law. The Shatapatha Brahmana frequently describes Varuna as the deity who punishes violations of ritual precision through his noose (pāśa) and cords, symbolic of cosmic and ethical consequences.

A significant ceremony called the Varunapraghasa is detailed. The Varunapraghasa sacrifice, performed during the rainy season, underscores Varuna’s association with cosmic law, where violations are metaphorically described as "eating Varuna’s barley," leading to divine punishment but also offering a path to redemption through ritual. Varuna’s dual nature is reflected in offerings of white barley (symbolizing light and unity) and black rice (representing the punitive aspect of law), illustrating his role as both a unifier and a judge. As such, Varuna's function is twofold: he enforces cosmic and social law, and he grants atonement through sacrifice.

The Taittirīya Brāhmaṇa highlights Varuna’s vigilance over truth (satya) and falsehood (anṛta), emphasizing his immediate retribution against deceit. He is identified with the cosmic waters (āpah), truth (satya), and darkness, all of which reflect dual aspects of creation and morality (pp. 88–90). Varuna is further described as Samvatsara—the cosmic year—and is associated with prana (life breath), Agni (fire), and as the holder of royal authority in the Rajasuya consecration rite.

Philosophical passages depict Varuna as enveloping the universe, akin to the cosmic waters that cover and permeate creation. This enveloping aspect (var) forms the etymological basis for his name, portraying him as both metaphysical principle and divine legislator.

=== Aranyakas ===
References to Varuna in the Aranyakas are limited but conceptually profound. The Aitareya Aranyaka describes the creation of Varuna and the cosmic waters through the mind (manas) of the Supreme Being. The waters and Varuna are said to serve their progenitor by yielding faith and preserving offspring through the law (dharma).

This philosophical depiction aligns Varuna with prakriti, the primordial substance of the universe, and suggests that he, like the waters, is an agent of Becoming—emerging at the moment of the Supreme’s creative desire. Thus, the Aranyakas treat Varuna not merely as a deity but as a metaphysical symbol representing the order and potential of existence.

=== Upanishads ===
In the Upanishads, the metaphysical emphasis shifts toward monism, and Varuna is often absorbed into the concept of the brahman, the Supreme Reality. While individual deities lose their independent theological status in favor of the unified Self (ātman), Varuna is still employed as a symbolic and pedagogical figure.

Varuna also finds a mention in the early Upanishads, where his role evolves. In verse 3.9.26 of the Brihadaranyaka Upanishad (~800 BCE), for example, he is stated to be the god of the western quarter, but one whose abode is water, whose world is the heart, soul is the fire and whose illumination is the mind. This establishes him as an intermediary symbol for the Self and its realization through inward knowledge. The cosmological hierarchy that begins with water and culminates in the heart is used to indicate that all arises from desire (kāma) in the Supreme’s mind. In the Katha Upanishad, Aditi is identified to be same as the goddess earth and the mother of Varuna and Mitra along with other Vedic gods.

The Chandogya Upanishad includes Varuna in ritual prayers and refers to him as the source of sustenance and purity. The Maitri Upanishad portrays him as one of many manifestations of the inner Self (ātman), acknowledging his place in the idealist ontology of the Upanishadic worldview.

Varuna, addressed as Varuni explained Brahman in Taittiriya Upanishad to sage Bhrigu. First six anuvakas of Bhrigu Valli are called Bhargavi Varuni Vidya, which means "the knowledge Bhrigu got from (his father) Varuni". It is in these anuvakas that sage Varuni advises Bhrigu with one of the oft-cited definition of Brahman, as "that from which beings originate, through which they live, and in which they re-enter after death, explore that because that is Brahman". This thematic, all encompassing, eternal nature of reality and existence develops as the basis for Bhrigu's emphasis on introspection, to help peel off the outer husks of knowledge, in order to reach and realize the innermost kernel of spiritual Self-knowledge.

== In Itihasa-Puranas ==
=== Mahabharata ===
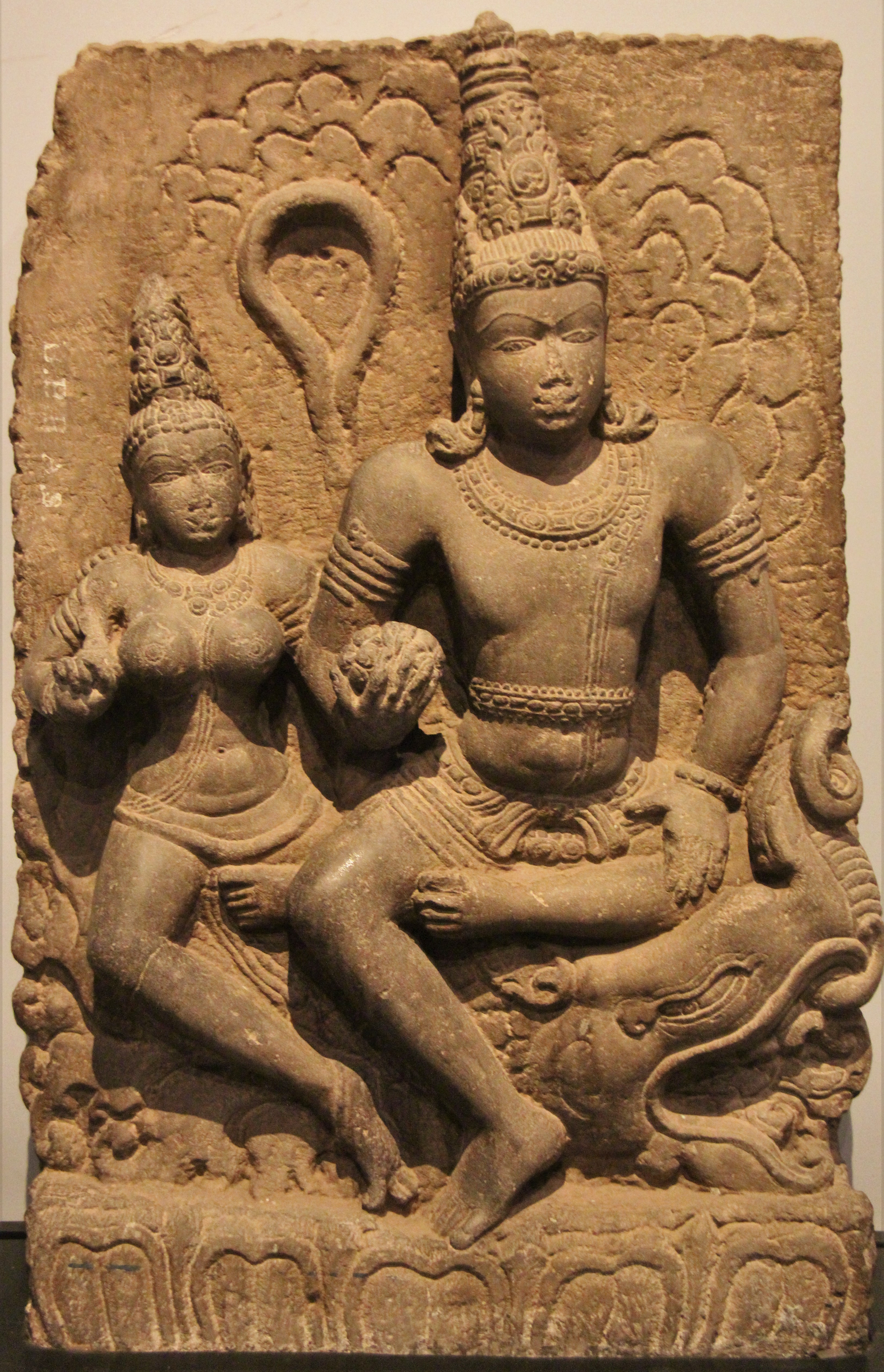
Varuna with his queen. Statue carved out of basalt, dates back to 8th century CE, discovered in Karnataka. On display at the Prince of Wales museum, Mumbai.

In the epic Mahabharata (c. 400 BCE - 400 CE), Varuna undergoes a notable transformation from his earlier Vedic portrayal. He is no longer depicted as the supreme sky god or an omnipotent sovereign administering cosmic order and morality, though his pairing with Mitra remains. The epic forgets his earlier associations with ṛta (cosmic order) and ethical oversight, emphasizing instead his role within a new mythological framework.

Varuna is still identified as the son of Aditi and fifth of the twelve Adityas, but his status is reduced as one of the Lokapalas, or guardians of the directions, specifically presiding over the western quarter—a symbolic alignment with the setting sun and perhaps with darkness and night. In this context, Kashyapa, Varuna's father, installed Varuna as Salileśvara, the sovereign of all forms of water, including rivers, lakes, and oceans.

As a water-god, Varuna is described being handsome, having the splendor of Lapis Lazuli. Unlike earlier texts where the waters (āpaḥ) held deep philosophical and metaphysical significance, the Mahabharata presents them in a more literal sense. Varuna resides beneath the waters, in a grand palace of pure white colour situated in Nagaloka, the oceanic realm (samudra), described vividly in the Udyoga Parva. There, adorned in radiant attire and gleaming jewels, he sits enthroned beside his queen, surrounded by aquatic beings, including nāgas, daityas, sādhyas, and river goddesses including Ganga and Yamuna. According to the Sabha Parva, Varuna also attends celestial assembly of the creator god, Brahma.

The Mahabharata expands Varuna's personal life. His chief-queen is most commonly identified as Varuni, who is depicted alongside him in his underwater palace. The Udyoga Parva refers to his beloved-wife as Gauri, while the Adi Parva names his spouse as Jyeshtha or Devi, the eldest daughter of Shukra. With Jyeshtha, Varuna is said to have fathered a son, Bala, and a daughter Sura, the wine goddess. The Vanaparva further mentions Vandin as another of Varuna’s sons. The Udyoga Parva adds another son, Pushkara, who married the daughter of the Moon god. In the Udyoga Parva, Varuna is also stated to have fathered the Kalinga king—Shrutayudha—from the river goddess Parnasha. Varuna also granted Shrutayudha a divine mace in response to prayers by Parnasha.

The Mahabharata also references Varuna’s iconic weapon, the pāśa (noose), though without the symbolic judicial weight it carried in the Vedic tradition. He is briefly mentioned as Pāśabhṛt, Ugrapāśa, Pāśin, and Pāśavān, with the noose appearing merely as one of his divine attributes.

Varuna appears in several narrative episodes throughout the epic. The Adi Parva recounts that during the burning of the Khandava forest, Varuna gifted Arjuna the celestial bow Gandiva, an inexhaustible quiver, and a monkey-bannered chariot, as well as the mace Kaumodaki to Krishna. Later, in the Mahaprasthanika Parva, Arjuna returned the Gandiva by casting it into the sea, effectively returning it to Varuna.

Another episode in the Adi Parva tells how Varuna abducted Bhadra, the wife of the sage Utathya. In response, Utathya dried up the ocean until Varuna returned her. The same text also narrates that when Kashyapa took Varuna’s sacred cow (homadhenu) for a sacrifice, Varuna and Brahma cursed him to be reborn as a cowherd. The Shalya Parva states that Varuna performed a rajasuya sacrifice at Yamunatirtha and later provided the war god Skanda with an elephant and two followers named Yama and Atiyama.

Other episodes include Varuna giving the sage Richika a thousand black-eared horses, testing King Nala alongside other deities, and granting Nala a boon that allowed him to assume any form, along with a garland of fragrant flowers. The Drona Parva also records that Varuna was once defeated in battle by Krishna, indicating the evolving hierarchy among deities in the epic tradition.

=== Ramayana ===
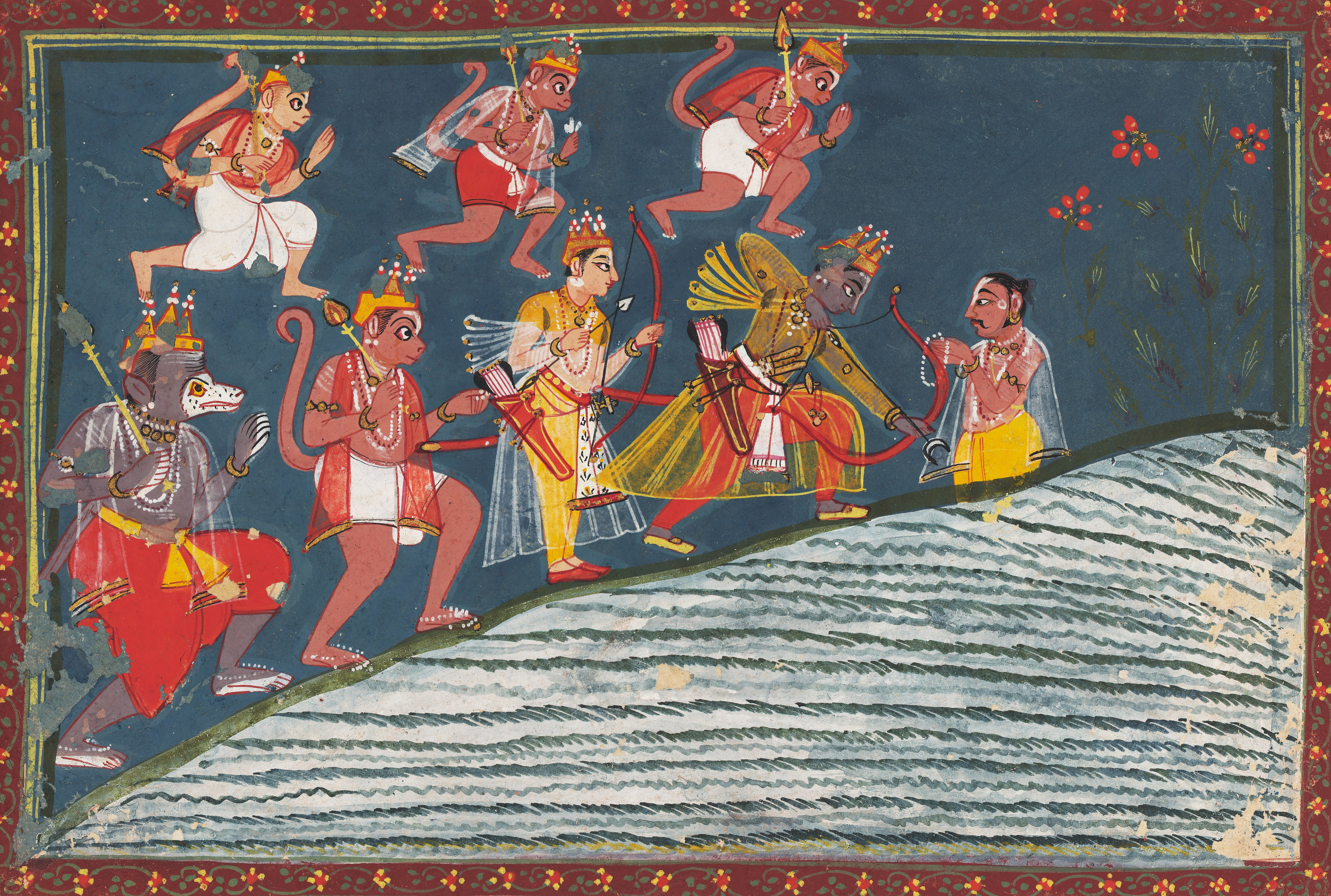
Rama vanquishing the pride of the ocean, Malwa, 17th century. Varuna is depicted arising from the depth of the ocean and begging Rama for forgiveness.

As in the Mahabharata, in the other major epic, the Ramayana (300 BCE - 300 CE), Varuna is depicted primarily as a Dikpala and as a water deity appointed by chief-god Brahma. Varuna appears weaker than in his earlier portrayals, being overpowered or sidelined by both the protagonist Rama—an avatar of Vishnu—and the antagonist Ravana, the demon king.

One of the most well-known episodes involving Varuna occurs in the Yuddha Kanda when Rama, preparing to invade the island Lanka to rescue his abducted wife Sita, seeks passage across the ocean. Rama performs a three-day penance to Varuna, the lord of oceans, but receives no reply. When Varuna initially remains silent, Rama, enraged, threatens to unleash his divine weapons, including the Brahmastra, to evaporate the sea. Varuna then appears, recognizing Rama’s authority and righteousness. He explains that his role as a guardian of natural order prevents him from parting the ocean, as it would disrupt natural balance. Instead, Varuna suggests constructing a bridge and pledges to stabilize the waters to aid the effort. Following this counsel, Rama entrusts the vanara architect Nala with building the bridge, known as Rama Setu. Many sources claim it was Samudra, the personification of the oceans, who met Rama not the water god Varuna.

In the Uttara Kanda, in an event taking place much before Rama's interaction, when Ravana’s conquests spread across the realms, several deities assume animal forms to escape detection—Varuna takes the form of a swan.

The Uttara Kanda also preserves the Vedic pairing of Varuna and Mitra in a myth recounting the birth of the sages Agastya and Vasishtha, though Vasishtha’s role here is framed as a rebirth. After losing his original body, Vasishtha enters the vital essence of Mitra and Varuna. At that time, the celestial nymph Urvashi arrives in Varuna’s realm, where Mitra holds temporary sway. Varuna desires her, and Urvashi reciprocates but remains bound by her prior promise to Mitra. Respecting this, Varuna releases his seed into a vessel fashioned by Brahma, which sanctifies the act as a symbolic consummation. Later, due to Urvashi’s divided fidelity, Mitra’s seed falls from her womb into the same vessel. From this vessel, containing the combined seed of Mitra and Varuna, Agastya and Vasishtha emerge, restoring the latter's body.

It also records that once during Varuna's absence in his realm, attending a musical event in Brahmaloka, Ravana confronts Varuna’s sons and grandsons, including Go and Pushkara, defeats them. Other children of Varuna mentioned in the Ramayana include the vanara Sushena, who was conceived with the purpose of aiding Rama in future, and the goddess of wine, referred to here as Varuni instead of Sura; she emerged during the churning of the ocean and chose the companionship of the devas, as narrated in the Bala Kanda.

=== Puranas ===
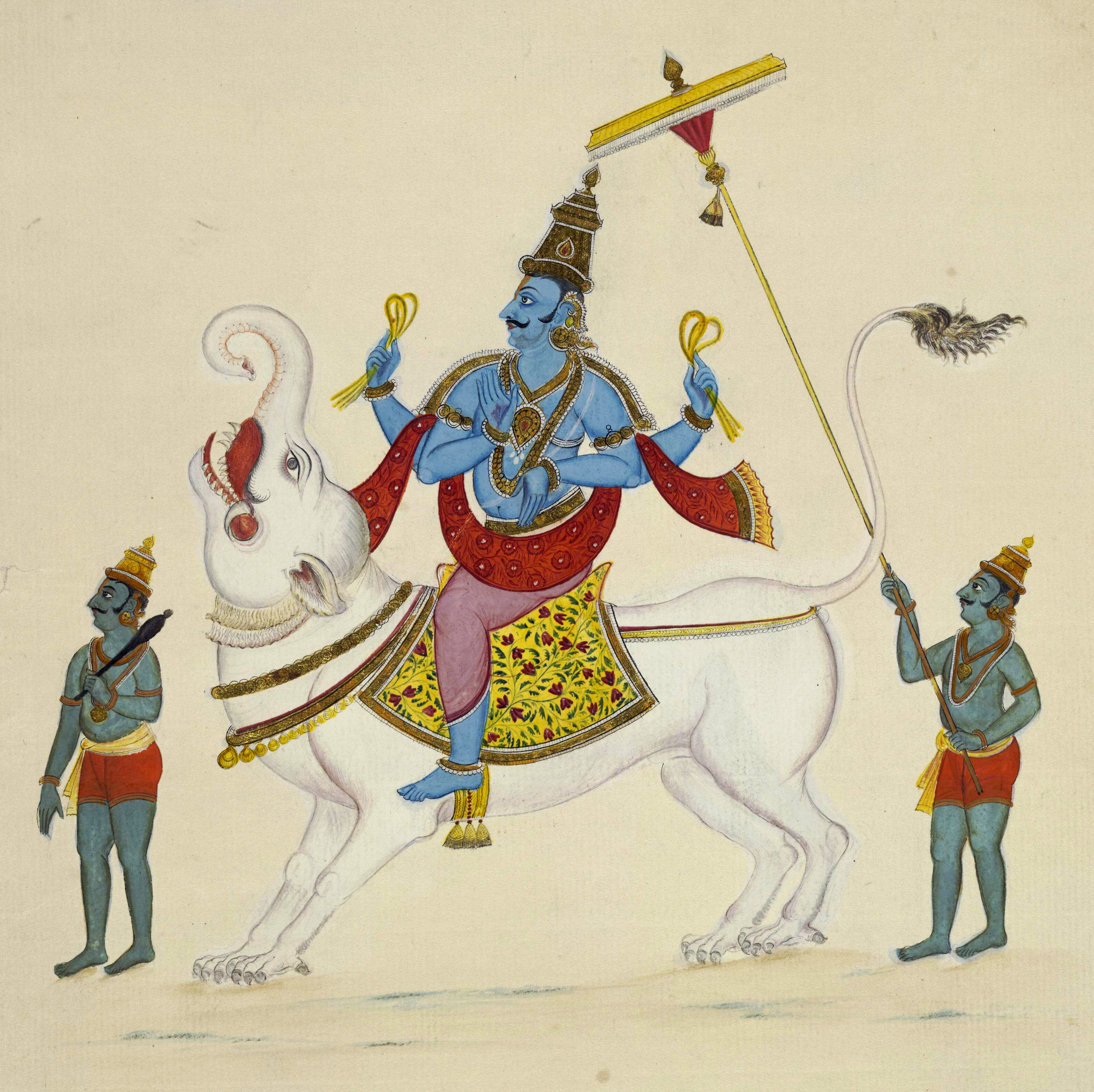
Varuna on a Makara with attendants, gouache on paper, c. 1820

By the time of the Puranas (mostly composed between 300 CE and 1000 CE), ancient Vedic deities such as Indra and Varuna are often portrayed as having diminished in power and esteem. They are frequently shown as subordinate to other gods, particularly Vishnu, Krishna and Shiva, and are sometimes humiliated by the increasingly dominant and aggressive Asuras, the term which, unlike in the Vedas, now only denotes to malevolent beings. In the Puranas (mostly composed between 300 CE and 1000 CE), the portrayal of Varuna remains broadly consistent with his depiction in the epics, but his divine attributes and roles are further elaborated, sometimes alluding to his Vedic associations. He continues to be described as the regent of the western direction and the guardian of the water element.

Despite his decline in stature in later mythology, Varuna retains considerable moral authority in the Puranas, punishing transgressors and upholding truth and cosmic law. In one narrative, King Harishchandra, having failed to fulfill a vow to Varuna after receiving a boon for a son, is afflicted with Mahodara (abdominal swelling) until the debt is resolved through a substitute offering. Similarly, Varuna punishes Nanda for entering sacred waters at an inauspicious time, but releases him upon Krishna’s intervention, acknowledging Krishna’s superior authority. The Bhagavata Purana further portrays Varuna as a warrior subordinate to Krishna, participating in divine battles alongside Indra, equipped with nooses and a mace. In one episode, Varuna confronts Krishna after the latter retrieves the Parijata tree from Indra’s palace, only to retreat when defeated by Krishna’s mount, Garuda. Elsewhere, in battles against demons like Kalanemi, Varuna is rendered motionless, likened to a drained ocean, while against Kujambha, he binds the demon’s arms with his noose and subdues him with his mace. He is also credited with binding the asura king Bali.

Iconographically, Varuna is depicted as riding the mythical sea creature Makara and holding a noose (pasha) in his hand. He often appears adorned with a white umbrella—said to have emerged during the churning of the ocean—and is described as having a conch-like or crystalline complexion, wearing garlands and bracelets. The Matsya Purana devotes considerable detail to Varuna’s iconography. His idol is to be worshipped in rites such as Vastupasamanam before the construction of palaces, and he is invoked in the Graha Shanti rite through offerings of pearls, lotus flowers, and kusha grass. He is said to be propitiated with avabhritha baths and other ceremonial acts. In the Hayasirsha Pancharatra, Varuna is described as seated on a swan, with two arms—one offering protection and the other holding a serpent-noose—surrounded by aquatic beings. Varuna is revered as a deity responsible for ensuring good and timely rainfall. Varuna's abode is described as being situated in the western direction on the summit of Mount Manasa, near the divine lake of Sukhi (according to the Vayu Purana) or Sushila (in the Matsya Purana). This location lies on the Puskara island, beneath which the sun’s chariot rotates around Mount Meru. At midnight in Samyamani, the sun is said to set in Varuna’s city. The Devi Bhagavata Purana attests his capital city as Śraddhāvatī. Varuna's celestial garden, Ritumat, is described in the Puranas as a place of great beauty located on the Trikuta mountain. The garden is adorned with flowering trees and also features a resplendent lake filled with golden lotuses, lilies, and other aquatic flowers.

Regarding his family, the Bhagavata Purana names Charsani as Varuna’s beloved-wife and the mother of the sage Bhrigu. Other sources continue to name Varunani, Gauri or Jyeshtha as his consorts. Varuna's other children include Sushena, Vandi, Varuni, Bala, Sura, Adharmaka, Dakshasavarni (the ninth Manu), Pushkara, and Valmiki, the latter born from Varuna’s semen on a termite mound. Although much reduced, Varuna's Vedic pairing with Mitra persists, notably in the vivid depiction of their shared infatuation with the celestial apsara Urvashi, portraying sages Agastya and Vasistha here as their reborn sons, either similar to the Vedic or the Ramayana version. Varuna’s link to progeny is further emphasized in narratives like Vaivasvata Manu’s sacrifice invoking Mitra and Varuna for offspring, and Harishchandra’s prayer to Varuna for a son, which leads to the aforementioned vow and punishment.

Varuna’s broader mythological roles encompass divine benefaction and protection. He is associated with hidden treasures and performed a rajasuya sacrifice, a standard for Yudhishthira’s own in the Mahabharata. His gifts include a water-sprinkling white umbrella for King Prithu’s coronation, a thousand white horses with black ears for Sage Richika to wed Satyavati, Varuni wine for Balarama, and nagapasha for Shiva’s marriage to Parvati, where Varuna appears as a divine dignitary. During the churning of the ocean, Varuna continues to play a significant role, aligning with his aquatic dominion. The Bhagavata Purana credits him with protecting Kraumcha-dvipa, beyond Kusha-dvipa, surrounded by an ocean of milk. Its central mountain, Kraumcha, remains unscathed by Kartikeya’s weapons due to Varuna’s guardianship and the washing of its slopes by sacred waters.

== Other accounts ==
=== In Tolkappiyam ===
The Tolkāppiyam, a Tamil grammar work from the 3rd century BCE divides the people of ancient Tamilakam into five Sangam landscape divisions: kurinji, mullai, paalai, marutham and neithal. Each landscape is designated with different gods. Neithal is described as a seashore landscape occupied by fishermen and seatraders, with the god of sea and rain, Varunan or Kadalōn. "Varuna" means water which denotes the ocean in the Tamil language.

=== Sri Lankan Tamils (Karaiyar caste) ===
Karaiyar is a Sri Lankan Tamils caste found mainly on the northern and eastern coastal areas of Sri Lanka, and globally among the Tamil diaspora. They are traditionally a seafaring community that is engaged in fishing, shipment and seaborne trade. They fish mostly in deep seas, and employ gillnet and seine fishing methods. The Karaiyars were the major maritime traders and boat owners who among other things, traded with pearls, chanks, tobacco, and shipped goods overseas to countries such as India, Myanmar and Indonesia. The community known for their maritime history, are also reputed as a warrior caste who contributed as army and navy soldiers of Tamil kings. They were noted as the army generals and navy captains of the Aryacakravarti dynasty. The Karaiyars emerged in the 1990s as strong representatives of Sri Lankan Tamil nationalism. The nuclear leadership of the Liberation Tigers of Tamil Eelam have background in the wealthier enterprising section of the Karaiyars.

The word "Karaiyar" is derived from the Tamil language words karai ("coast" or "shore") and yar ("people"). The term Kareoi mentioned by 2nd century CE writer Ptolemy, is identified with the Tamil word "Karaiyar". The Portuguese and Dutch sources mentions them under the term Careas, Careaz, or Carias, which are terms denoting "Karaiyar".

Kurukulam, Varunakulam and Arasakulam were historically one of the significant clans of the Karaiyars. Kurukulam, meaning "clan of the Kuru", may be a reference to their origin from Kurumandalam (meaning "realm of Kuru's") of Southern India. They attribute their origin myth from the Kuru Kingdom, mentioned in the Hindu epic Mahabharata. Some scholars derived Kurukulam from Kuru, the Tamil name for Jupiter. Varunakulam, meaning "clan of Varuna", is a reference to their maritime origin. Varuna is the god of sea and rain, mentioned in Vedic Literature, but also in Sangam literature as the principal deity of the Neithal Sangam landscape (i.e. littoral landscape). Arasakulam means "clan of kings". They used the Makara as emblem, the mount of their clan deity, the sea god Varuna, which was also seen on their flags.

=== Sindhi Hindus ===
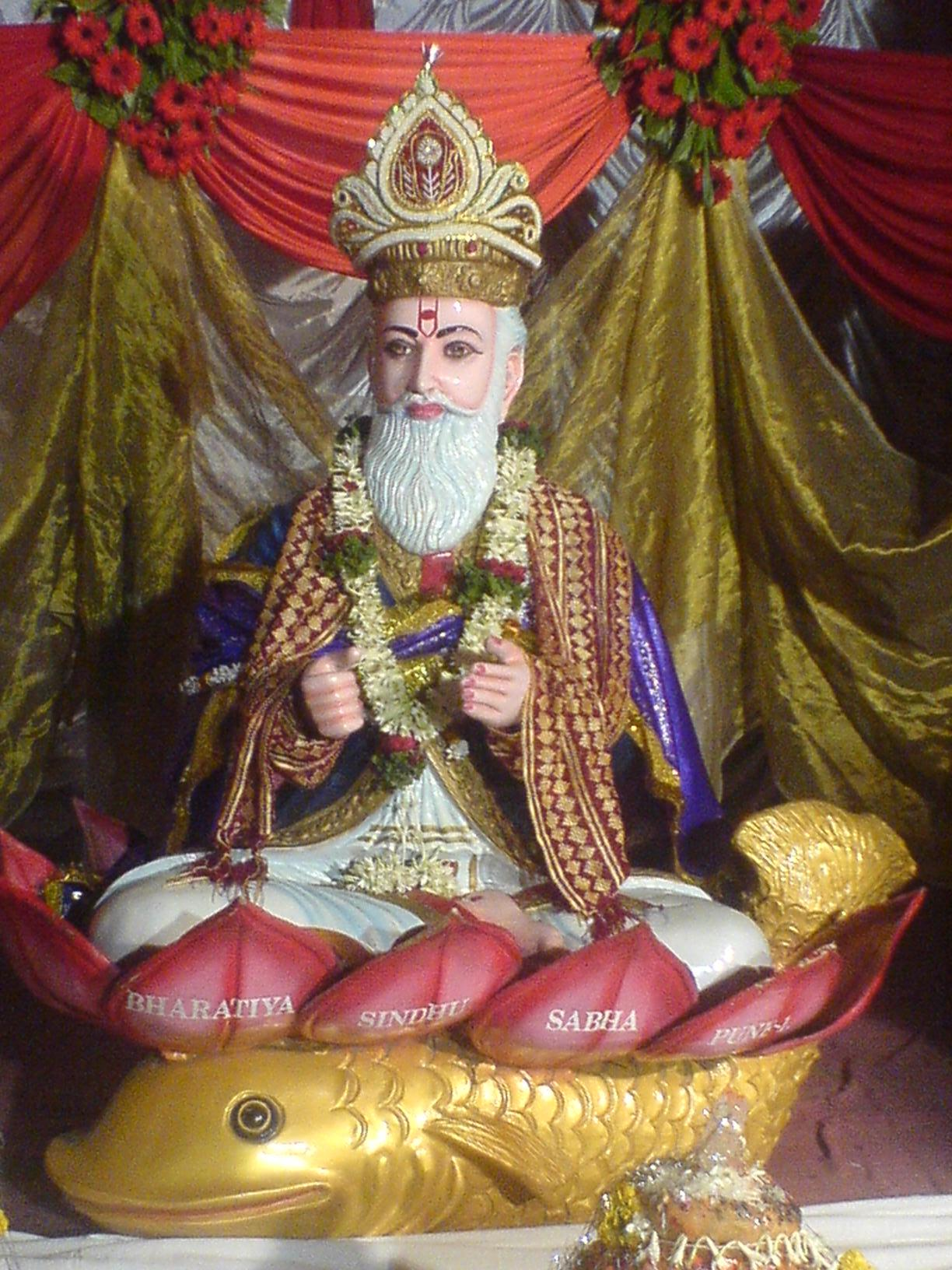
Jhulelal is considered an incarnation of Varuna by Sindhi Hindus.

Jhulelal is believed by Sindhi Hindus to be an incarnation of Varuna. They celebrate the festival of Cheti Chand in his honor. The festival marks the arrival of spring and harvest, but in Sindhi community it also marks the birth of Uderolal in year 1007, after they prayed to Hindu god Varuna to save them from the persecution by tyrannical Muslim ruler named Mirkhshah. Uderolal morphed into a warrior and old man who preached and reprimanded Mirkhshah that Muslims and Hindus deserve the same religious freedoms. He, as Jhulelal, became the champion of the people in Sindh, from both religions. Among his Sufi Muslim followers, Jhulelal is known as "Khwaja Khizir" or "Sheikh Tahit". The Hindu Sindhi, according to this legend, celebrate the new year as Uderolal's birthday.

== Festivals ==
=== Cheti Chand ===
The Cheti Chand festival in the Hindu month of Chaitra marks the arrival of spring and harvest, but in Sindhi Hindu community, it also marks the mythical birth of Uderolal in the year 1007. Uderolal morphed into a warrior and old man who preached and reprimanded Mirkhshah that Muslims and Hindus deserve the same religious freedoms. He, as Jhulelal, became the saviour of the Sindhi Hindus, who according to this legend, celebrate the new year as Uderolal's birthday.

=== Chaliya saheb ===
Chalio or Chaliho, also called Chaliho Sahib, is a forty-day-long festival celebrated by Sindhi Hindus to express their gratitude to Jhulelal for saving them from their impending conversion to Islam. The festival is observed every year in the months of July to August; dates vary according to the Hindu calendar. It is a thanksgiving celebration in honor of Varuna Deva for listening to their prayers.

=== Narali Poornima ===
Nārali Poornima is a ceremonial day observed by Hindu fishing communities in Maharashtra, India particularly around Mumbai and the Konkan coast. It is held on the full-moon day of the Hindu month of Shravan which falls around July or August. On this day offerings such as rice, flowers and coconuts are offered to Lord Varuna, the god of ocean and waters.

=== The Saree-clad man ceremony ===
In parts of Karnataka, local communities perform unconventional ceremonies to request rain from Varuna during drought conditions. In Anche Doddi village, Mandya district, residents conducted a ritual that involved a young man dressed in a saree. This individual walked at the front of a village procession while carrying a statue of Varuna on his head. Another person followed with a second idol. The procession also included participants holding umbrellas, incense, and a plough, which symbolizes hope for a good harvest. The group visited each house, where women offered prayers using sandalwood sticks and camphor lamps. Women then poured water onto the idols while the men repeatedly bowed. After the village circuit was complete, the idols were placed in a nearby lake. The ceremonial food was then shared among the villagers. Local residents believe this practice encourages Varuna to bring rainfall. Such rituals have occurred multiple times in Karnataka as a response to dry conditions.

== Beyond Hinduism ==
=== Buddhism ===
==== Theravada ====
The Pali Canon of the Theravada school recognizes Varuṇa (Sanskrit; Pali: Varuna) as a king of the devas and companion of Sakka, Pajāpati and Isāna. In the battle against the Asuras, the devas of Tāvatiṃsa were asked to look upon the banner of Varuna in order to have all their fears dispelled (S.i.219).

The Tevijja Sutta mentions him among Indra, Soma, Isāna, Pajāpati, Yama and Mahiddhi as gods that are invoked by the brahmins.

The Ātānātiya Sutta lists him among the Yakkha chiefs.

Buddhaghosa states (SA.i.262) that Varuna is equal in age and glory (vanna) with Sakka and takes the third seat in the assembly of devas.

==== Mahayana ====
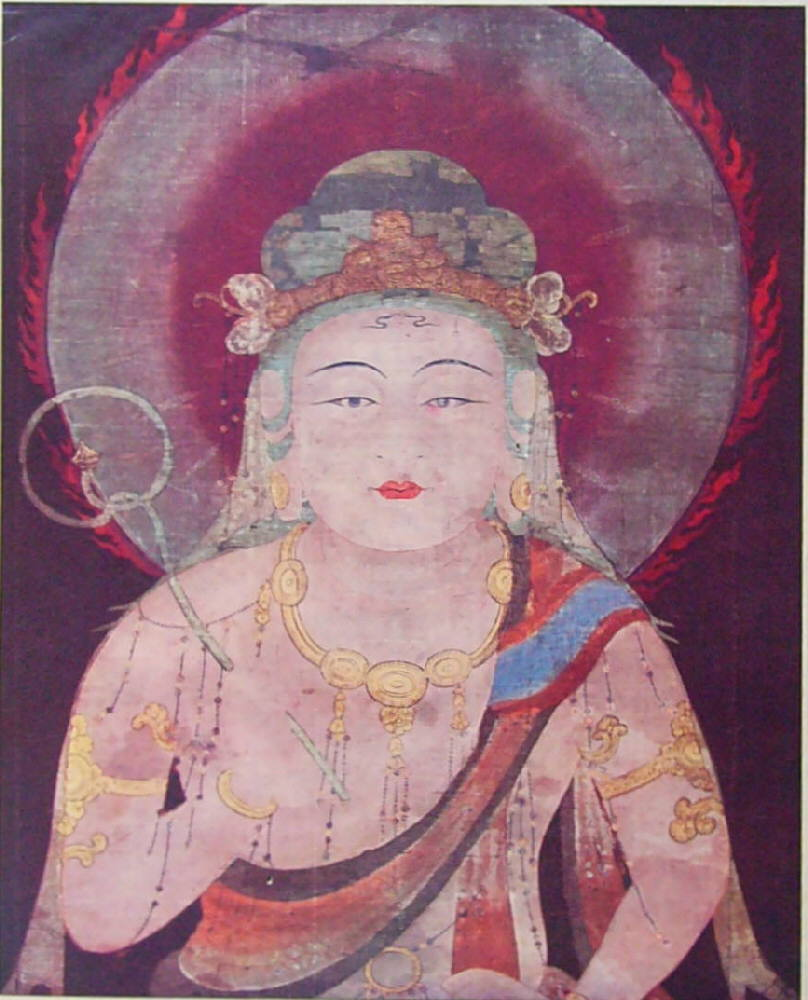
Painting of Varuna (Kyoto, Japan)

In East Asian Buddhism, Varuna is a dharmapāla and often classed as one of the Twelve Devas (Japanese: Jūniten, 十二天). He presides over the western direction.

In Japan, he is called "Suiten" (水天 lit. "water deva"). He is included with the other eleven devas, which include Taishakuten (Śakra/Indra), Fūten (Vāyu), Emmaten (Yama), Rasetsuten (Nirṛti/Rākṣasa), Ishanaten (Īśāna), Bishamonten (Vaiśravaṇa/Kubera), Katen (Agni), Bonten (Brahmā), Jiten (Pṛthivī), Nitten (Sūrya/Āditya), and Gatten (Chandra).

=== Shinto ===
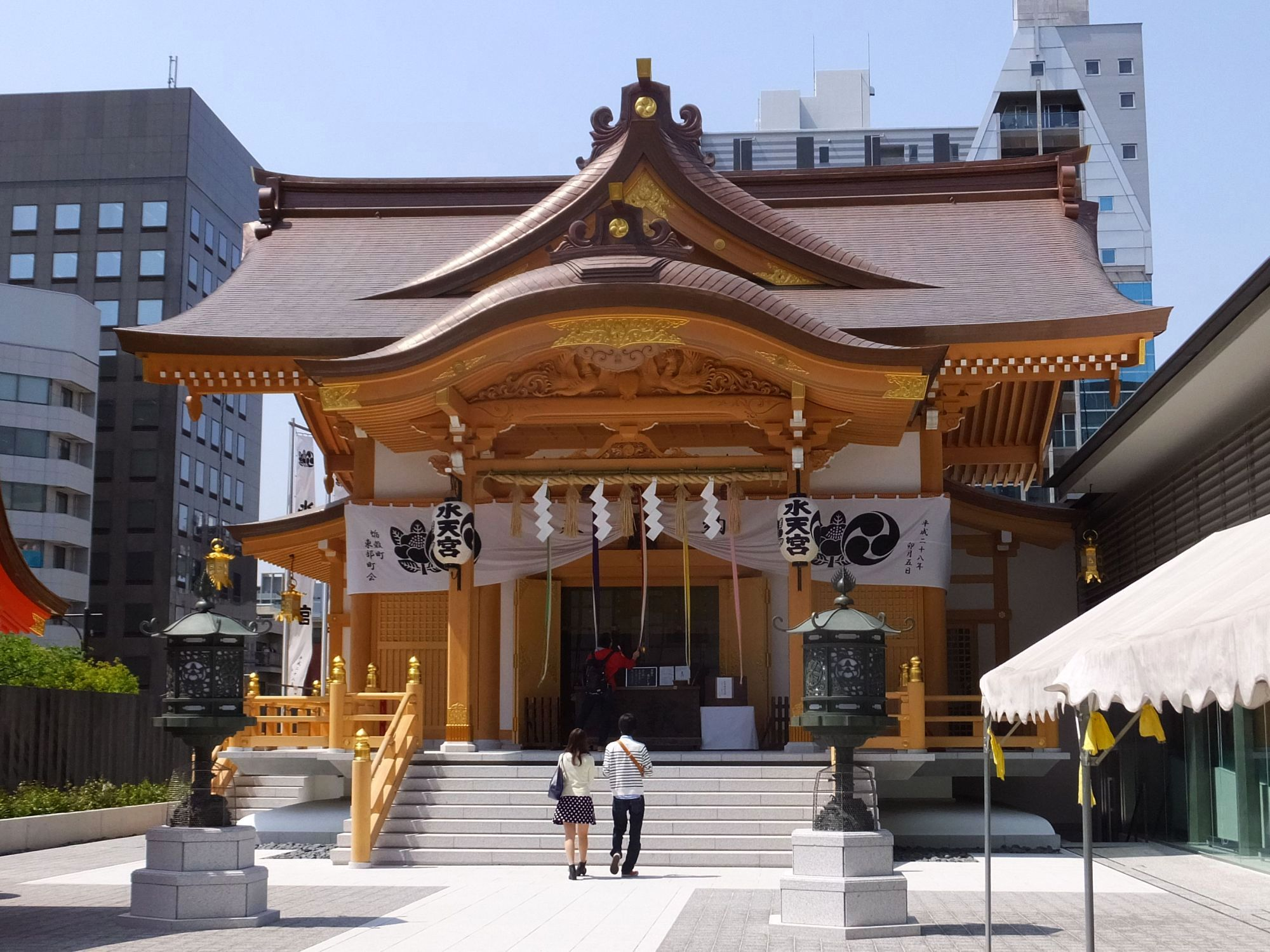
Suitengū (Tokyo) is a Shinto shrine to Varuna.

Varuna is also worshipped in Japan's Shinto religion. One of the Shinto shrines dedicated to him is the Suitengū ("Palace of Suiten") in Tokyo. After the Japanese emperor issued the Shinbutsu bunri, the separation of Shinto and Buddhist practices as part of the Meiji Restoration, Varuna/Suiten was identified with the Japanese supreme God, Amenominakanushi.

=== Varuna and Uranus: An Indo-European Cognate Pair ===
Comparative mythologists have identified parallels between the vedic god Varuna and the Greek god Uranus (Ouranos), suggesting a common Proto-Indo-European origin. The names are thought to derive from a root meaning "to cover" or "to encompass," referring to the vault of the sky. In his 1934 study Ouranos-Varuna, Georges Dumézil compared the mythological roles of both deities, noting that each is associated with sovereignty, cosmic law, and the act of binding or restraint. According to the Encyclopedia of Religion, Varuna functions as the guardian of cosmic order (rita), while Uranus personifies the overarching heavens. Some scholars caution that direct linguistic derivation is uncertain, but the structural similarities in myth and function are widely recognized.

== See also ==
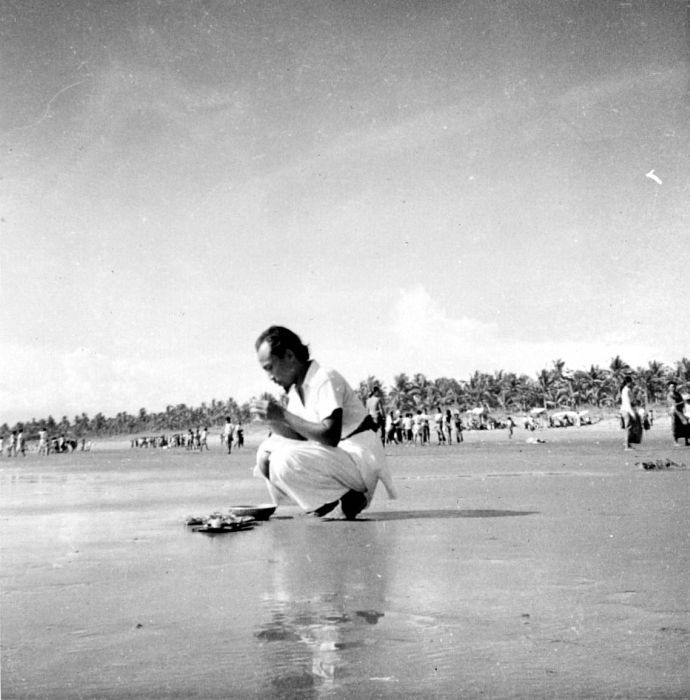
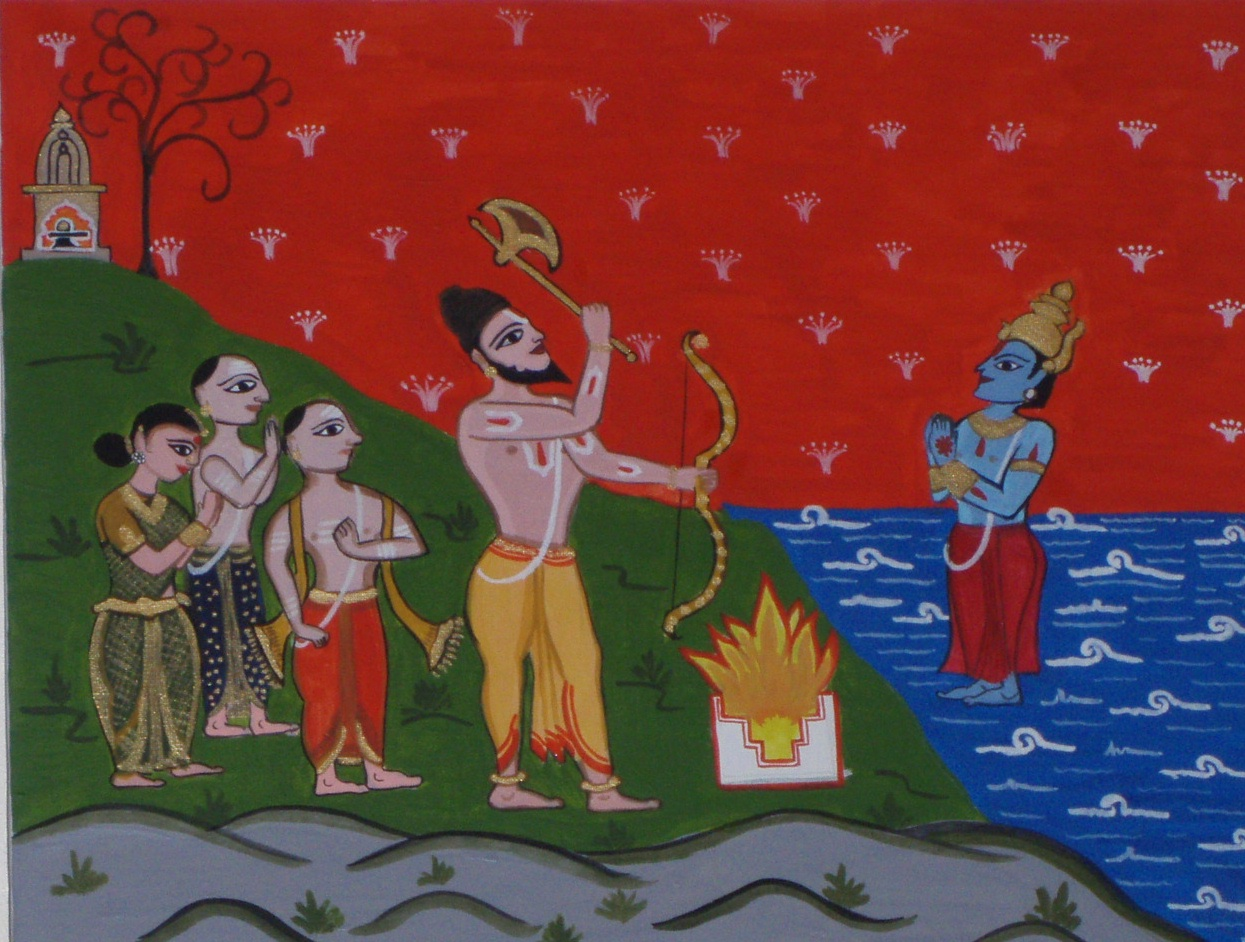
Left: A Balinese Hindu offering prayers to Varuna on Indonesian beach;
Right: Vishnu avatar Parasurama, asking Varuna to create new land known as Parashuram Sristi.
- Ādityas
- Apam Napat
- Asura
- Guardians of the directions
- Hindu deities
- Mitra (Vedic)
- Mitra–Varuna
- Rigvedic deities
- Shukra
- The king and the god
