= Towatari Shrine =

Shinto shrine in Chiba, Japan

Towatari Shrine 登渡神社
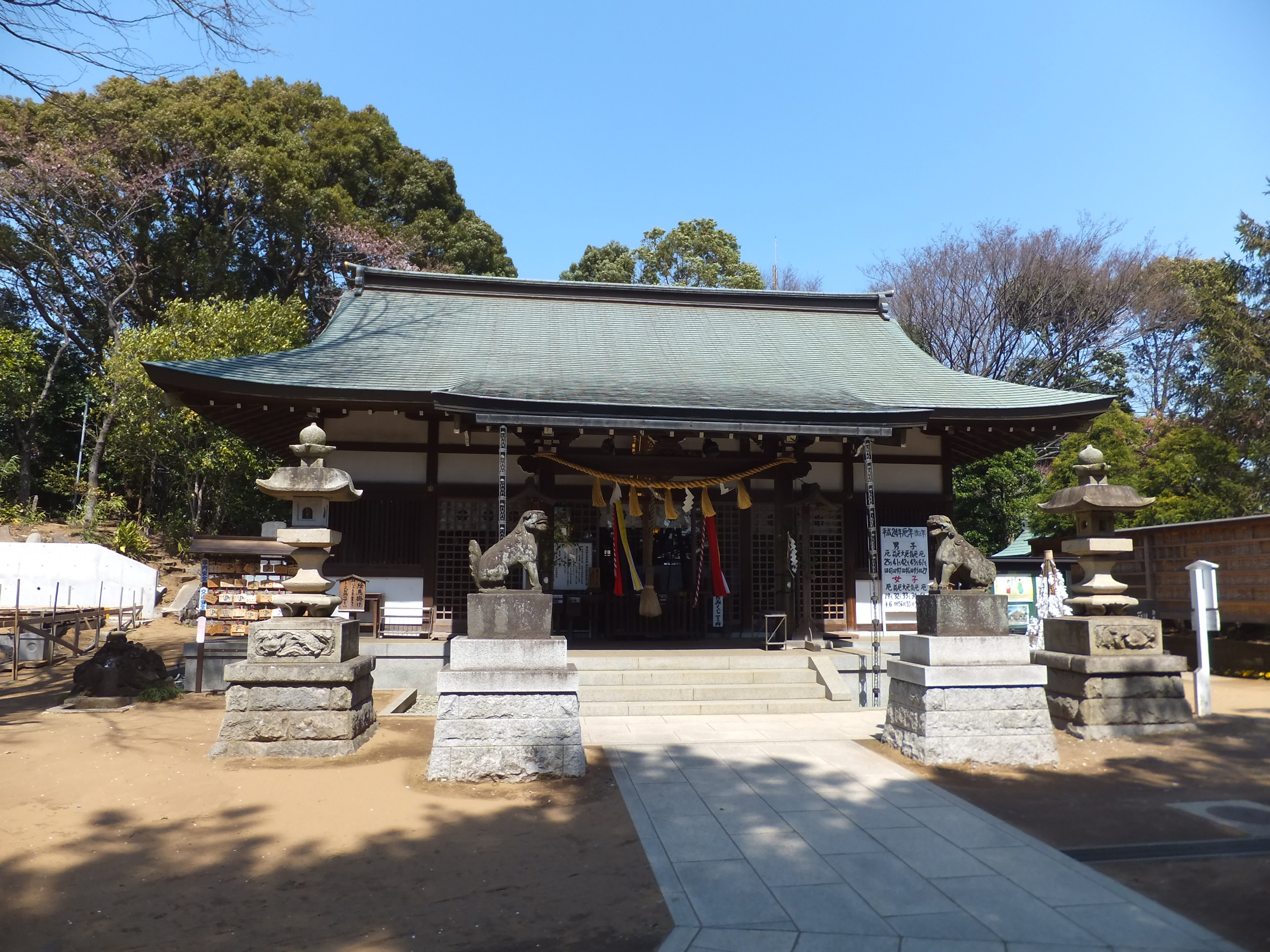
- Towatari Shrine's hei-haiden

- Location within Japan

Religion
- Affiliation: Shinto
- Deity: Ame-no-Minakanushi (formerly Myōken); Kamimusubi; Takamimusubi; Ame-no-Hiwashi
- Festival: 4–6 September

Location
- Location: 3-3-8, Nobuto, Chūō-ku, Chiba, Chiba Prefecture
- Interactive map of Towatari Shrine 登渡神社
- Coordinates: 35°36′44.3″N 140°6′22.6″E

Architecture
- Founder: Chiba Sadatane
- Established: 1644 (Shōhō 1)

Website
- www.towatarijinjya.com

Towatari Shrine (登渡神社, Towatari-jinja), also known as Nobuto Shrine (登戸神社, Nobuto-jinja), is a Shinto shrine located in Nobuto, Chūō-ku, Chiba City, Chiba Prefecture, Japan. Originally a branch temple of Kongojū-ji, a temple to the Buddhist deity Myōken founded by the Chiba clan (modern Chiba Shrine), it was converted into a Shinto shrine during the mid-19th century.

== Deities ==
The shrine is dedicated to the three deities of creation (造化三神, zōka sanshin) of classical Japanese mythology: Ame-no-Minakanushi, Takamimusubi, and Kamimusubi. Enshrined together with them is Ame-no-Hiwashi, originally the deity of a nearby shrine that was merged into Nobuto Shrine in 1908 (Meiji 41).

== History ==
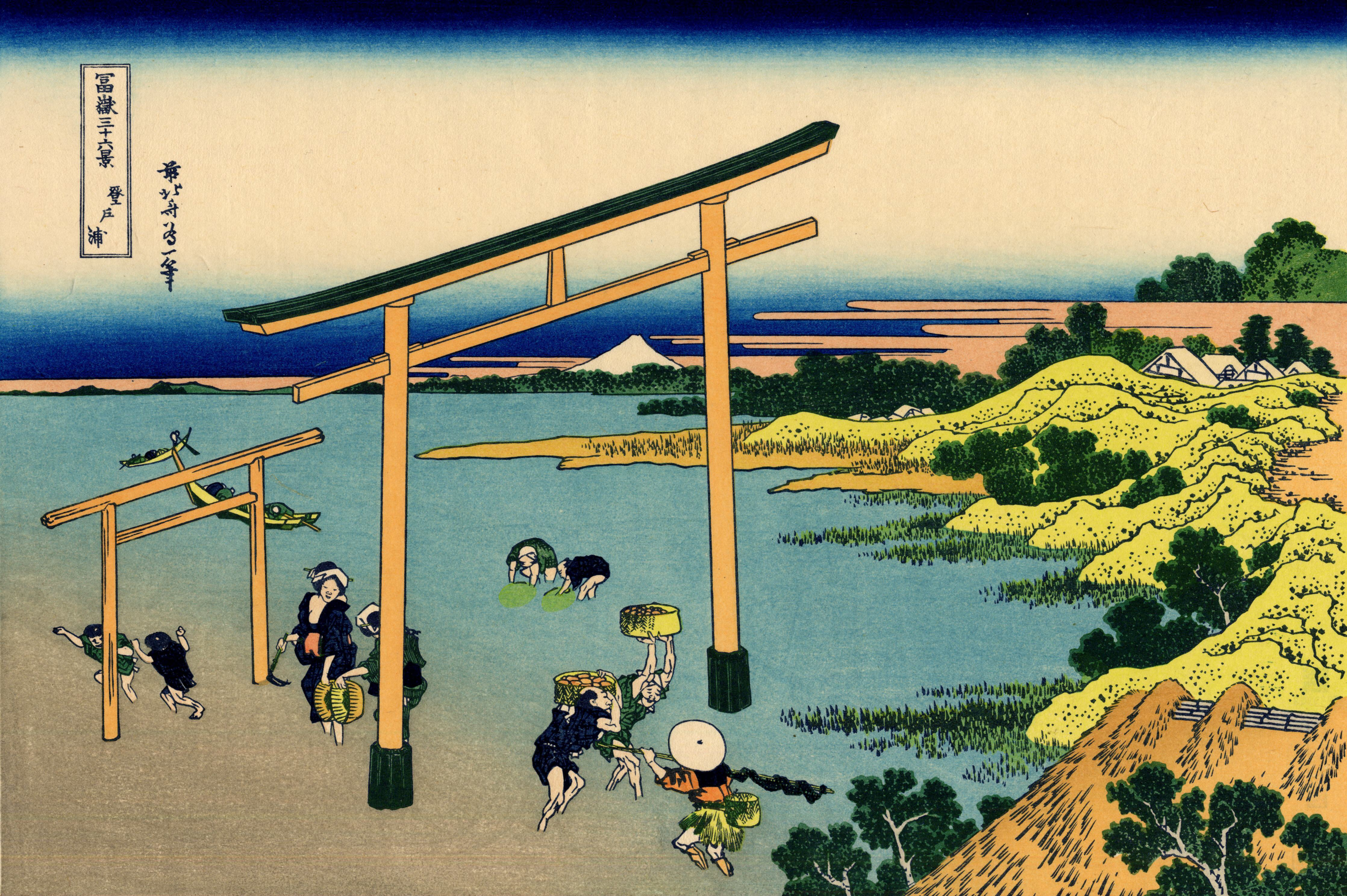
Bay of Noboto (Nobuto) by Katsushika Hokusai

The shrine was originally founded in 1644 (Shōhō 1) by Chiba Sadatane, 33rd head of the Chiba clan, as a Buddhist temple named Hakujasan Shinkō-in Jōin-ji (白蛇山真光院定胤寺). It was a branch temple or matsuji (末寺) of Kongojū-ji (also known as Chiba Myōken-ji), a temple dedicated to Myōken, the Buddhist deification of the Big Dipper and/or the northern pole star revered by the Chiba clan as their patron deity (what is today Chiba Shrine).

In 1867 (Keiō 3), the temple became a Shinto shrine dedicated to the gods Ame-no-Minakanushi (a deity in Japanese mythology conflated with Myōken), Takamimusubi, and Kamimusubi and renamed "Towatari Shrine".

In 1990 (Heisei 2), the shrine's honden (dating from 1860) was moved to its present location and a new hei-haiden constructed in front of it.

== Structures ==
- Honden

The honden was originally Jōin-ji's former main hall, constructed in 1860 by a craftsman named Monjirō (紋次郎) from the village of Yagi in Katsushika District, Shimōsa Province (part of the modern city of Nagareyama, Chiba Prefecture). (Note: Other notable projects by this artisan include the former main hall (the current Shaka-dō (釈迦堂) or Hall of Śākyamuni) of Shinshō-ji in Narita (built 1858) and the former main hall of Fukagawa Fudō-dō (a branch of Shinshō-ji) in Fukagawa, Kōtō City, Tokyo - originally a sanctuary dedicated to the bodhisattva Kṣitigarbha (地蔵堂, Jizō-dō) in Ryūfuku-ji in what is now Inzai built somewhere between 1861 and 1864.) The bas-reliefs decorating the building were carved by Tatekawa Washirō Tomimasa (立川和四郎富昌, the 2nd generation of the Tatekawa Washirō line of craftsmen) from Suwa District in Shinano Province (modern Nagano Prefecture) and/or his son Tomishige (富重). The reliefs were designated tangible cultural properties by Chiba City in 1967 (Shōwa 42).

== See also ==
- Chiba Shrine
- Chiba clan
- Taira clan
- Shimōsa Province
