= Myōken =

Buddhist deification of the North Star

Myōken (Sudṛṣṭi)
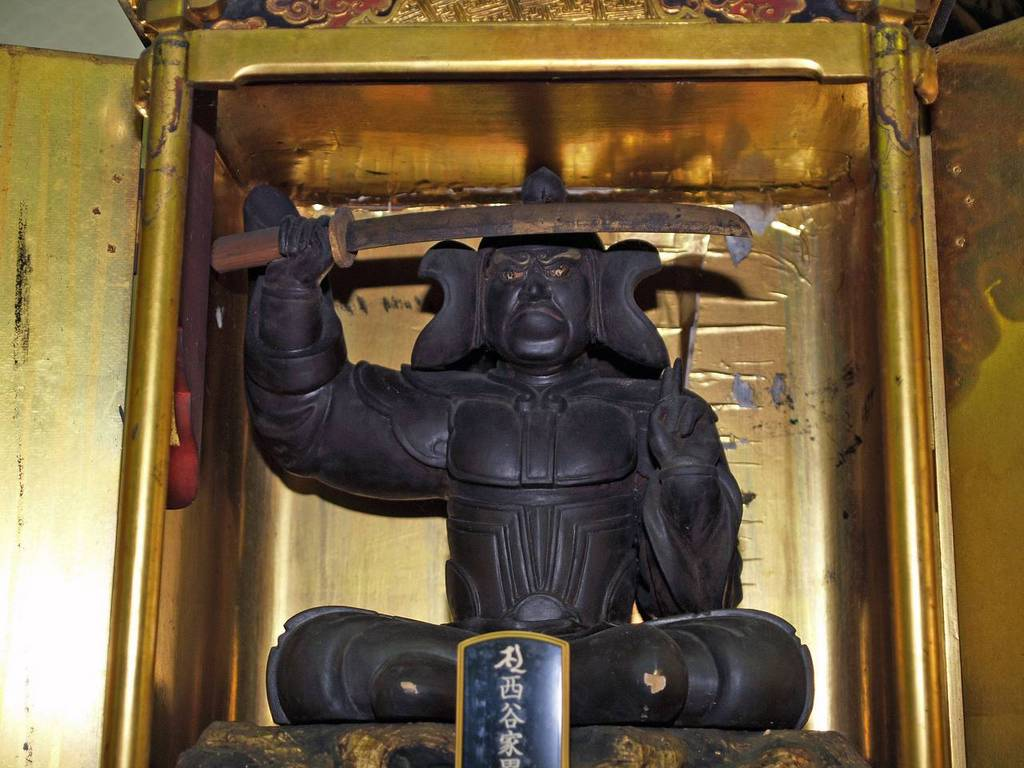
- Statue of Myōken of the 'Nose Myōken' (能勢妙見) type, showing him as a warrior with an upraised sword in his right hand (Hōun-ji, Kami, Hyōgo Prefecture)
- Sanskrit: सुदृष्टि (IAST: Sudṛṣṭi)
- Chinese: (Traditional) 妙見菩薩 (Simplified) 妙见菩萨 (Pinyin: Miàojiàn Púsà) (Traditional) 妙見尊星王 (Simplified) 妙见尊星王 (Pinyin: Miàojiàn Zūnxīng Wáng)
- Japanese: 妙見菩薩 (Myōken Bosatsu) 尊星王 (Sonjō-Ō / Sonshō-Ō / Sonsei-Ō) 北辰菩薩 (Hokushin Bosatsu) 妙見尊星王 (Myōken Sonjō-Ō) 北辰妙見菩薩 (Hokushin Myōken Bosatsu)
- Korean: 묘견보살 (RR: Myogyeon Bosal) 존성왕 (RR: Jonseong Bosal)
- Vietnamese: Diệu Kiến Bồ Tát; Tôn Tinh Vương

Information
- Venerated by: Mahāyāna, Vajrayāna
- Attributes: sword, tortoise, Big Dipper

Myōken (Sanskrit: सुदृष्टि, Sudṛṣṭi; Chinese: 妙見菩薩 (Traditional) / 妙见菩萨 (Simplified), pinyin: Miàojiàn Púsà; Japanese: 妙見菩薩, Myōken Bosatsu), also known as Sonjō-Ō (尊星王, "Venerable Star King", also Sonsei-Ō or Sonshō-Ō), is a Buddhist deification of the North Star worshiped mainly in the Shingon, Tendai and Nichiren schools of Japanese Buddhism.

Despite the alleged Sanskrit origin of his name and his bodhisattva status, Myōken is conspicuously absent from early Buddhist literature, with his name first appearing in apocryphal sutras of Chinese origin. He is thus thought to have originated from Taoist and folk beliefs regarding the northern pole star and/or the Big Dipper that had syncretized with Buddhism during the Tang dynasty. Indeed, despite being called 'bodhisattva' (bosatsu), the deity is actually more often classified as a deva.

The cult of Myōken is believed to have been introduced to Japan around the 7th century by the toraijin, immigrants from the Korean kingdoms of Goguryeo and Baekje, most notably the legendary Prince Imseong, and flourished during the Heian period (794–1185). The eastern half of the country (the modern Kantō and Tōhoku regions), where these immigrants were settled, became a notable stronghold of Myōken worship; the Chiba clan, based on what is now Chiba Prefecture, and its offshoots adopted Myōken as their patron deity and spread his cult through their domains across Japan. Myōken also became an important deity within certain branches of Nichiren Buddhism (such as Nichiren-shū) due to the school's connections with the Chiba.

== Origins ==
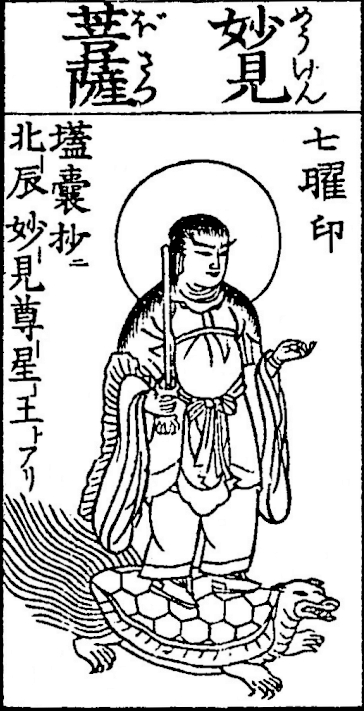
Myōken riding a tortoise

During the Tang dynasty, Chinese Buddhism adopted Taoist Big Dipper worship, borrowing various texts and rituals which were then modified to conform with Buddhist practices and doctrines. The cult of the Big Dipper was eventually absorbed in the cults of various Buddhist divinities, Myōken being one of these.

The earliest source on Myōken is The Divine Spells of the Great Dhāraṇīs Taught by the Seven Buddhas and Eight Bodhisattvas (traditional: 七佛八菩薩所説大陀羅尼神咒經, Pinyin: Qīfó bā púsà suǒshuō dà tuóluóní shénzhòu jīng; T. 1332), purportedly translated some time during the Eastern Jin dynasty (317–420 CE). In the text, Myōken introduces himself as "the bodhisattva of the north star (北辰菩薩) named 'Wondrous Vision' (妙見, pinyin: Miàojiàn, Japanese: Myōken)." (Note: 「我北辰菩薩、名曰妙見。今欲說神呪擁護諸國土。所作甚奇特故名曰妙見。」)

By the Tang period, esoteric texts and rituals centered on Myōken proliferated; a number of astral mandalas with Myōken as the primary divinity, drawing directly on the Tang texts, have been preserved in Japan. Ennin's diary of his travels in China in 838 suggests that the cult of Myōken was still flourishing there during the late Tang period.

== Spread to Japan ==
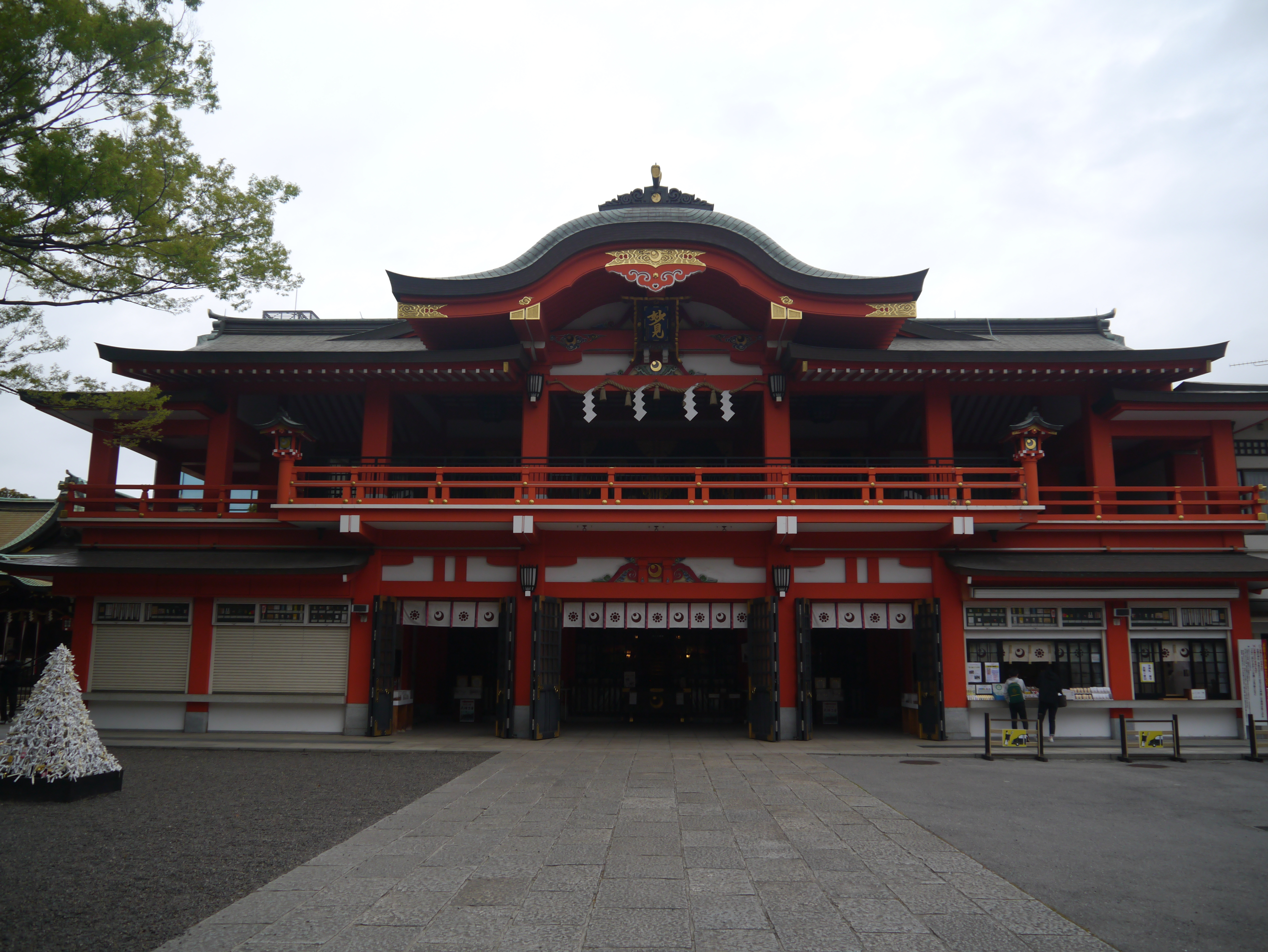
Chiba Shrine in Chiba City, Chiba Prefecture Originally an 11th-century Buddhist temple dedicated to Myōken, converted into a Shinto shrine during the Meiji period

The cult of Myōken is thought to have been brought in Japan during the 7th century by immigrants (toraijin) from Goguryeo and Baekje, most notably Prince Imseong. During the reign of Emperor Tenji (661–672), the toraijin were resettled in the easternmost parts of the country; as a result, Myōken worship spread throughout the eastern provinces.

By the Heian period, pole star worship had become widespread enough that imperial decrees banned it for the reason that it involved "mingling of men and women," and thus caused ritual impurity. Pole star worship was also forbidden among the inhabitants of the capital and nearby areas when the imperial princess (Saiō) made her way to Ise to begin her service at the shrines. Nevertheless, the cult of the pole star left its mark on imperial rituals such as the emperor's enthronement and the worship of the imperial clan deity at Ise Shrine. Worship of the pole star was also practiced in Onmyōdō, where it was deified as Chintaku Reifujin (鎮宅霊符神).

Myōken worship was particularly prevalent among clans based in eastern Japan (the modern Kantō and Tōhoku regions), with the Kanmu Taira clan (Kanmu Heishi) and their offshoots such as the Chiba and the Sōma clans being among the deity's notable devotees. One legend claims that Taira no Masakado was a devotee of Myōken, who aided him in his military exploits. When Masakado grew proud and arrogant, the deity withdrew his favor and instead aided Masakado's uncle Yoshifumi, the ancestor of the Chiba clan. Owing to his status as the Chiba clan's ujigami (guardian deity), temples and shrines dedicated to Myōken are particularly numerous in former Chiba territories. Myōken worship is also prevalent in many Nichiren-shū Buddhist temples due to the clan's connections with the school's Nakayama lineage.

Veneration of Myōken as a god of war is believed to derive from the practice of worshiping the easternmost star of the Big Dipper, Alkaid (η UMa), known in Chinese as the 'Broken Army' or the 'Destroyer of Armies' (破軍星, Pinyin: Pòjūn xīng; Japanese: Hagunsei) to bring success in battle. The Sutra of the Big Dipper for Prolonging Life (北斗七星延命經, Pinyin: Běidǒu qīxīng yánmìng jīng; T. 1307) identifies Alkaid with the buddha Bhaisajyaguru (Yakushi Nyorai), (Note: 「南無破軍星。是東方琉璃世界藥師琉璃光如來佛。」) so that Myōken is thus sometimes considered to be a manifestation of Bhaisajyaguru. In other traditions Myōken was also associated with Kisshōten (Mahāśrī, one of the Seven Lucky Gods). Indeed, some early depictions of Myōken shared similar attributes to those of Kisshōten that a number of what are commonly believed to be depictions of Kisshōten may have originally been Myōken statues.

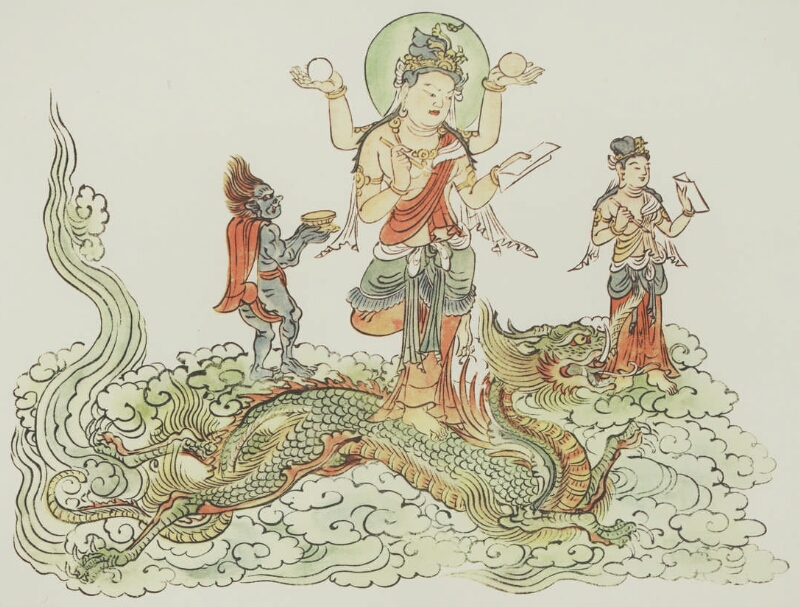
Depiction of Myōken with four arms

During the late Edo period, the kokugaku scholar Hirata Atsutane identified the Big Dipper with the primordial deity Amenominakanushi-no-Kami. Due to the separation of Buddhism and Shinto, many shrines (and some temples) dedicated to Myōken officially became Amenominakanushi shrines.

== Iconography ==
Depictions of Myōken have varied greatly over time. Aside from representations which conform to standard bodhisattva iconography, Myōken is also portrayed as a youth or as an armored, stern-faced figure holding a sword above his head. He can be shown standing or sitting atop a cloud, a dragon or a tortoise (the symbol of the north in Chinese cosmology). Artistic portrayals of Myōken, particularly those showing him with a sword, are thought to be influenced by depictions of the Taoist deity Xuanwu, who is also venerated as the god of the north.

== See also ==
- Astrotheology
- Big Dipper
- Black Tortoise
- Tara (Buddhism)
- Buddhism in Japan
- Chiba clan
- Chiba Shrine
- Dhruva
- Little Dipper
- Mount Myōken (Tajima)
- Tianhuang Emperor
- Xuanwu (god)
- Ziwei Emperor
