= Mount Myōken =

Mount Myōken (妙見山) is the name of several mountains in Japan:

- Mount Myōken (Nose) on the borders of Hyogo and Osaka prefectures - see Myoken Cable
- Mount Myōken (Tajima) in Hyogo Prefecture
