= Hakusan =

Hakusan can refer to:

- Mount Haku, located in the Chūbu region of Japan, one of Japan's "Three Holy Mountains"
  - Hakusan National Park, a national park surrounding Mount Hakusan
  - Hakusan, Ishikawa, a city located in Ishikawa, Japan
- Hakusan, Mie, a former town located in Mie, Japan
- Mount Hakusan (Hyōgo), a mountain located in Hyōgo Prefecture, Japan
- Hakusan Station (Tokyo), a metro station in Tokyo, Japan
