= Hōun-ji =

Hōun-ji (法雲寺) is the name of numerous Buddhist temples in Japan. Below is an incomplete list:

- Hōun-ji in Sakai, Osaka Prefecture
- Hōun-ji in Kamigōri, Hyōgo Prefecture
- Hōun-ji in Kami, Hyōgo Prefecture
