= Mount Ōgi =

Mountain in Hyōgo and Tottori prefecture, Japan

- 扇ノ山
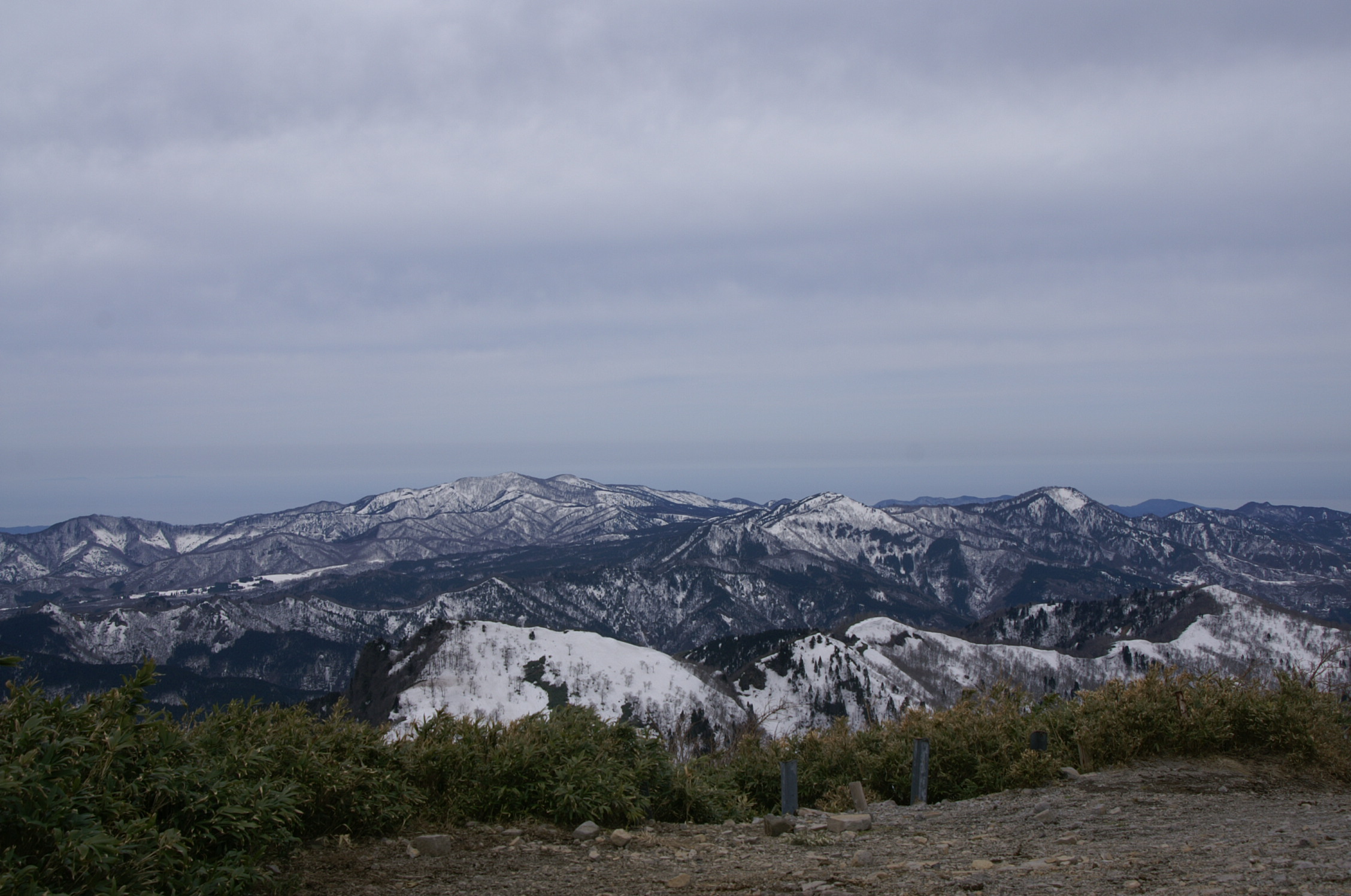

Highest point
- Elevation: 1,309.9 m (4,298 ft)
- Coordinates: 35°26′23″N 134°26′27″E

Geography
- Location: Hyōgo and Tottori Prefecture, Japan

Mount Ōgi (扇ノ山, Ōginosen) is a mountain located in Hyōgo and Tottori Prefectures with an altitude of 1,309.9 m (4,298 ft). It has been selected as one of the 100 famous mountains in Kansai and 300 famous mountains in Japan.

It is one of the representative volcanoes in the Kansai region and there are Yumura hot springs and Iwai hot springs at the foot of the mountain. It is also one of the most popular mountain skiing destinations in western Japan.
