= Mount Jakuchi =

Mountain in Japan

- 寂地山
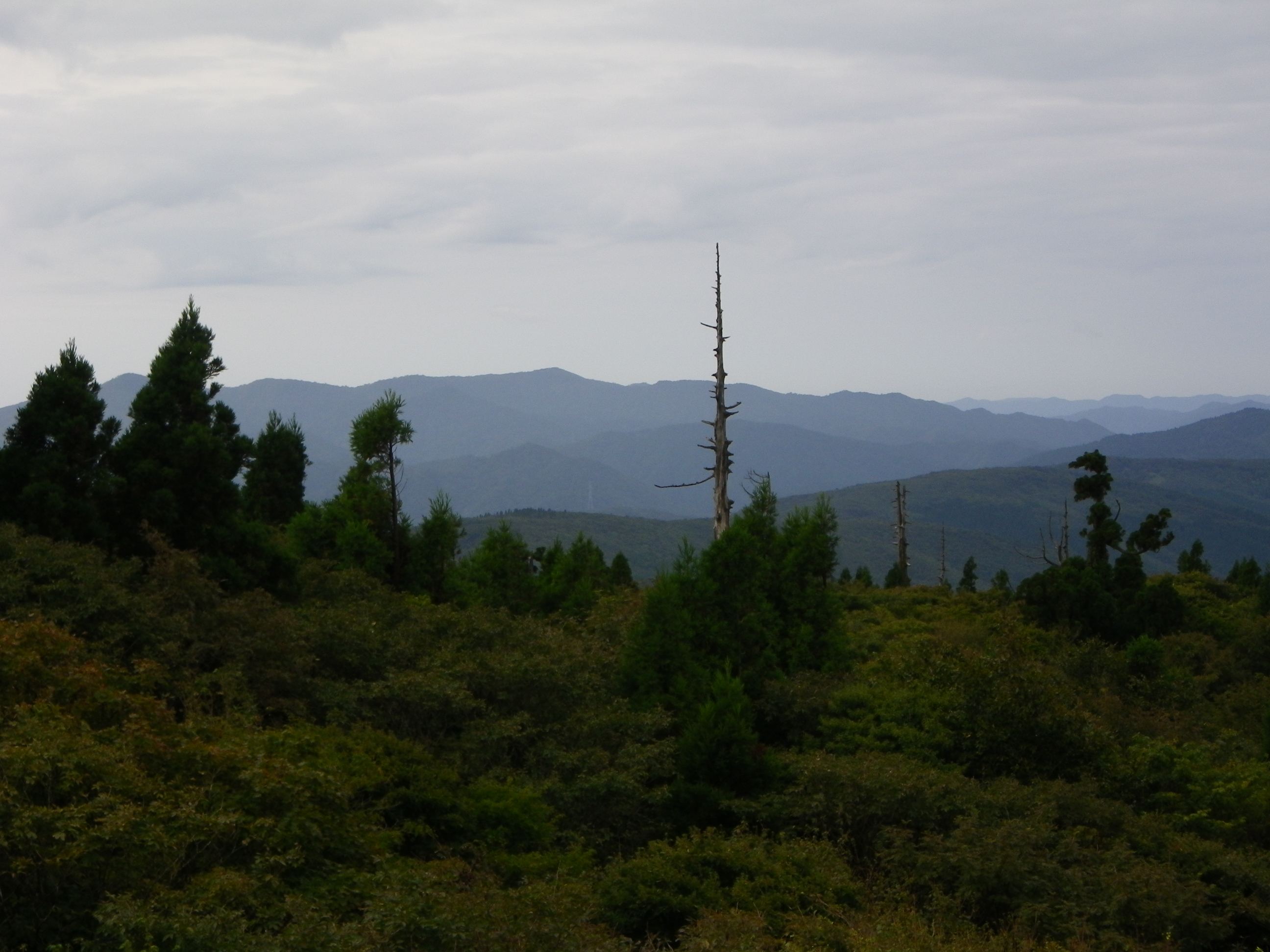
- Mount Jakuchi

Highest point
- Elevation: 1,337 m (4,386 ft)Mount Jakuchi Mountain Information
- Listing: List of mountains and hills of Japan by height
- Coordinates: 34°28′2.2″N 132°3′16.7″E

Geography
- Location within Japan
- Location: Honshu, Japan
- Parent range: Chūgoku Mountains

Mount Jakuchi (寂地山, Jakuchi-san) is a mountain located on the border of Iwakuni, Yamaguchi Prefecture, and Yoshika, Shimane Prefecture, Japan.

It is the highest mountain in Yamaguchi Prefecture.
