= Chiba Shrine =

Shinto shrine in Chiba, Japan

Chiba Shrine 千葉神社
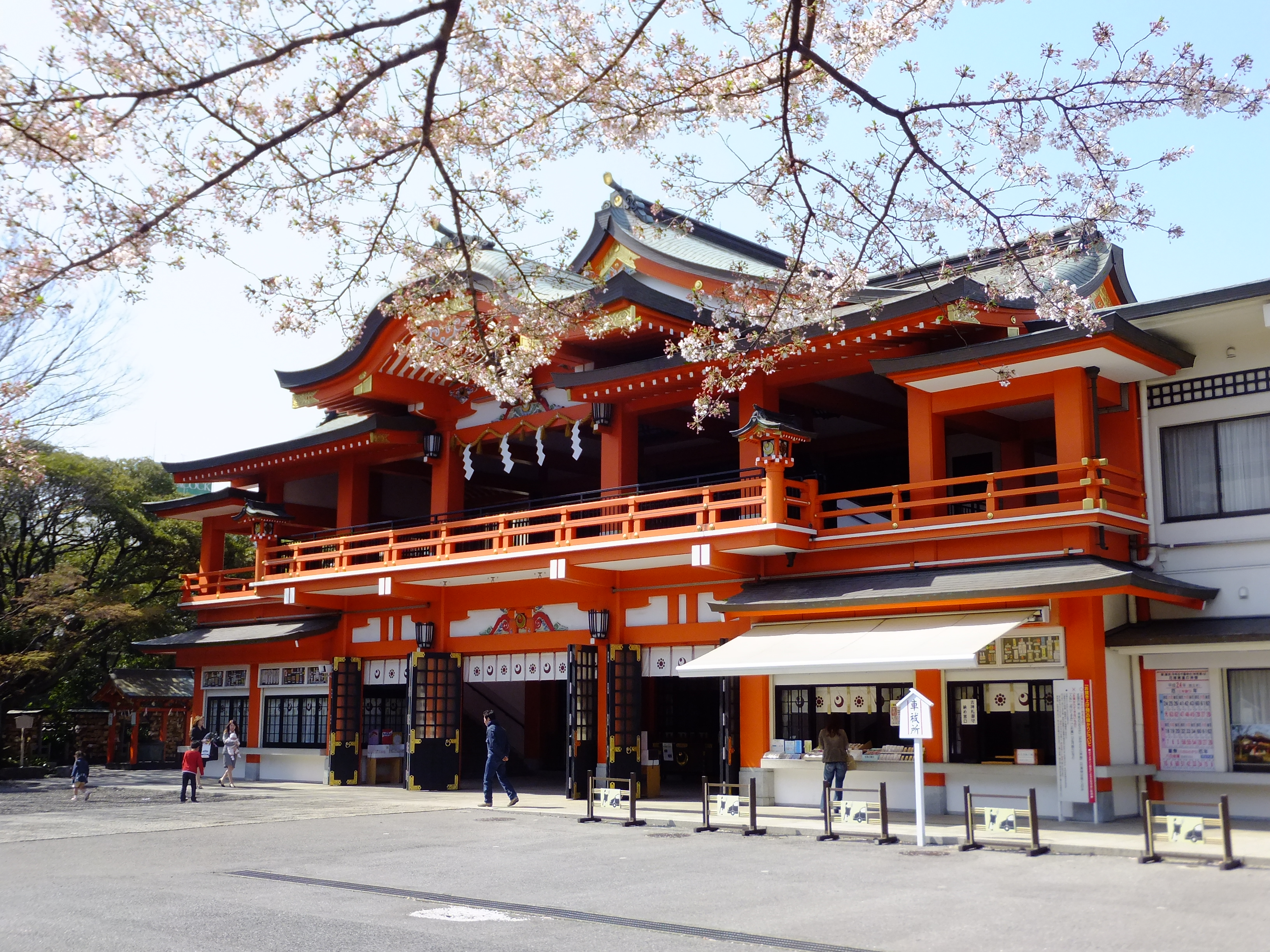
- Chiba Shrine's two-story shrine building (重層社殿, jūsō-shaden)

- Location within Japan

Religion
- Affiliation: Shinto
- Deity: Ame-no-Minakanushi (formerly Myōken); Futsunushi; Yamato Takeru
- Festivals: Myōken Taisai (16-22 August); Otori-sama (November)

Location
- Location: 1-16-1, Innai, Chūō-ku, Chiba, Chiba Prefecture
- Interactive map of Chiba Shrine 千葉神社
- Coordinates: 35°36′42.5″N 140°7′25.8″E

Architecture
- Founder: Taira no Tadatsune, Kakusan
- Established: 1000 (Chōhō 2)

Website
- www.chibajinja.com

Chiba Shrine (千葉神社, Chiba-jinja) is a Shinto shrine located in Chūō-ku, Chiba City, Chiba Prefecture. Originally a Buddhist temple dedicated to the deity Myōken, the patron of the Chiba clan, it was converted into a Shinto shrine dedicated to Ame-no-Minakanushi (a kami in Japanese mythology conflated with Myōken) during the Meiji period.

Due to its historical status as one of the principal centers of Myōken worship in Chiba Prefecture associated with the Chiba clan, the shrine is also popularly known as Chiba Dai-Myōken (千葉大妙見, "Great Myōken [Shrine] of Chiba"), Myōken Hongū (妙見本宮, the ″Main Shrine (Hongū) of Myōken″), or simply as Myōken-sama (妙見様).

== Deities ==
The shrine's main deity is the god Ame-no-Minakanushi under the name 'Hokushin Myōken Sonjō-Ō' (北辰妙見尊星王, lit. "Venerable Star King Myōken of the North Star (Hokushin)").

The shrine's auxiliary deities are:

- Futsunushi

Futsunushi (the warrior god of Katori Jingū in Katori, Chiba) is jointly worshiped here as the site where Chiba Shrine stands was originally part of the precincts of a nearby Katori branch shrine known as Innai Katori Shrine (院内香取神社, Innai Katori-jinja). As the 'landlord' of the Chiba Shrine grounds, certain deferential customs are observed during the shrine's week-long Myōken Taisai festival out of respect for Futsunushi.

- Yamato Takeru

== Background ==
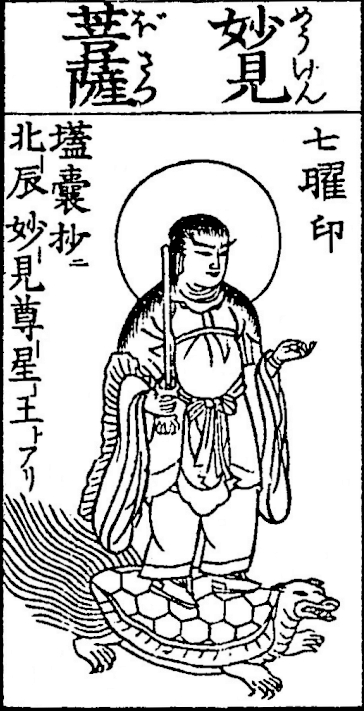
Myōken (from the Butsuzōzui)

Chiba Shrine was originally a temple to the Buddhist divinity Myōken (Sanskrit: Sudṛṣṭi, lit. "Wondrous Vision"), the deification of the Big Dipper and/or the northern pole star.

The cult of Myōken is thought to have developed in China during the Tang period, when Taoist Big Dipper and pole star worship was adopted into Buddhism. It was then introduced into Japan somewhere during the 7th century by immigrants (toraijin) from Goguryeo and Baekje. Myōken worship flourished in the eastern half of the country (the modern Kantō and Tōhoku regions) - where the toraijin were resettled during the reign of Emperor Tenji (reigned 661–672 CE) - and was quite prevalent among many clans based in this area such as the Chiba and the Sōma clans. Temples and shrines to Myōken were especially numerous in former Chiba territories.

The relationship between Myōken and the Chiba clan is traditionally traced back to the clan's ancestor, Taira no Yoshifumi, the uncle of Taira no Masakado. Legend states that when Yoshifumi and his nephew was about to lose a battle against Yoshifumi's elder brother Kunika (father of Taira no Sadamori) at the Someya River (染谷川, Someyagawa) in Kōzuke Province (modern Gunma Prefecture), they were rescued by Myōken, the deity of nearby Sokusai-ji (息災寺, modern Myōken-ji in Takasaki, Gunma). After reaching safety, Yoshifumi went to this temple to express his gratitude and took one of the seven statues of Myōken enshrined there with him. This image was passed down to his descendants, who venerated Myōken as their patron deity.

When the Meiji government enforced the separation of Shinto and Buddhism in the late 19th century, many shrines that venerated Buddhist figures or deities of mixed heritage either changed or associated their deities to ones found in classical Japanese mythology as written in texts such as the Kojiki and the Nihon Shoki. Many places of worship dedicated to Myōken thus began to identify their deity as Ame-no-Minakanushi, a primordial deity who (like Myōken) came to be identified with the pole star and the Big Dipper.

== History ==
According to tradition, the Buddhist temple Hokutosan Kongōju-ji (北斗山金剛授寺 (Note: Hokuto (北斗) is the Sino-Japanese name for the Big Dipper.)) was founded in the thirteenth day of the ninth month of the year 1000 (Chōhō 2) by the monk Kakusan (覚算), a son of Taira no Tadatsune (the paternal grandson of Yoshifumi), who then became its first abbot (大僧正 daisōjō or 座主 zasu). The temple was built at the command of Emperor Ichijō (reigned 986-1011) in thanksgiving for his recovery from an eye disease. (Note: Myōken, whose name means "Wondrous Vision", is also invoked against eye ailments.)

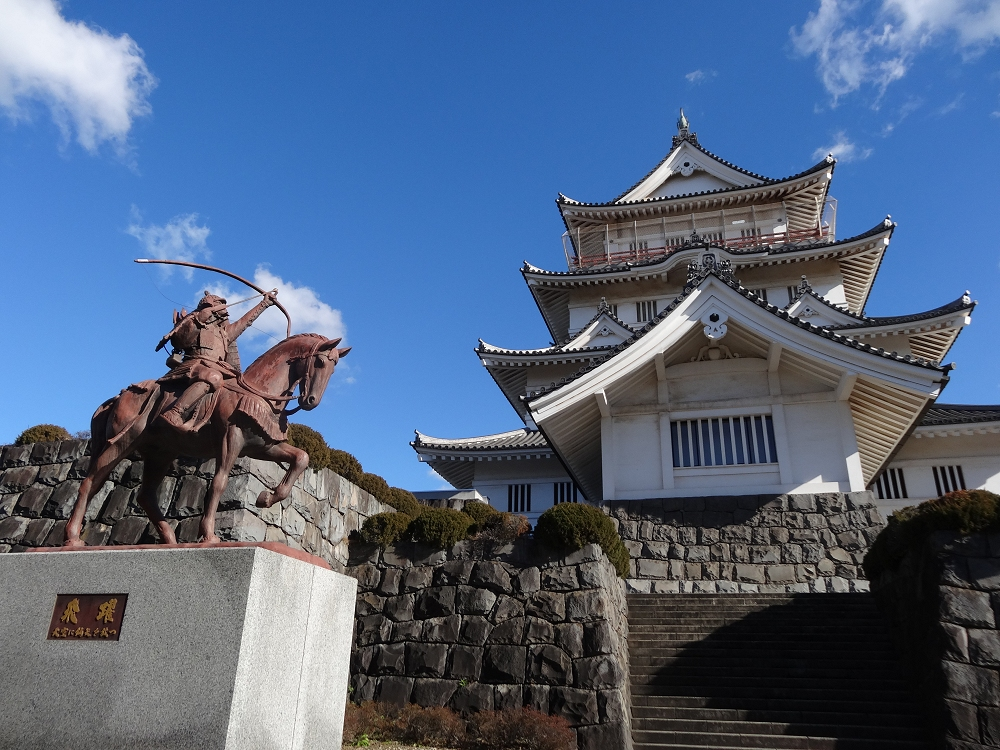
Statue of Chiba Tsunetane with the Chiba City Folk Museum (built on the former site of Inohana Castle) in the background

In 1126 (Daiji 1), Tadatsune's great-great-grandson Taira no Tsuneshige transferred his clan's power base from Ōjī Castle in Kazusa Province (modern Ōji-chō, Midori-ku, Chiba City) to a new castle located about a kilometer south of Kongōju-ji, situated in a natural plateau known as Mount Inohana (modern Inohana, Chūō-ku). During the transfer, the clan shrine to Myōken which enshrined the image supposedly brought by Yoshifumi from Sokusai-ji situated within the castle precincts was merged into the temple complex. Myōken Taisai (the "Great Festival of Myōken"), the temple's (and later, the shrine's) annual festival, was first held in 1127, the year after the clan - now calling itself 'Chiba' - moved to Inohana Castle, and has continued uninterrupted for nearly nine centuries since. As the Chiba's seat of power, the area surrounding the castle and the temple, Chiba Manor (千葉荘, Chiba-no-shō), began to prosper during this period.

During the Genpei War (1180–1185), the Chiba clan, headed by Tsuneshige's son Tsunetane, chose to side with Minamoto no Yoritomo against Taira no Kiyomori. Yoritomo himself is said to have visited the temple on his way to Kamakura in 1180. After Kiyomori's defeat, the clan was rewarded large domains throughout Japan. Myōken's cult spread to these areas as a result.

By the Muromachi period, a series of external and internal conflicts had severely weakened the Chiba. In 1455, Makuwari (Chiba) Yasutane (son of 14th clan head Mitsutane and brother of 15th head Kanetane) overthrew the clan's main branch, then led by his nephew Tanenao, and assumed leadership, only to be defeated and killed under the orders of shōgun Ashikaga Yoshimasa. Inohana Castle was abandoned in the aftermath of this conflict, with the Chiba (now under Yasutane's son Suketane) moving this time to another castle located in what is now the city of Sakura. The clan head's coming-of-age ceremony, however, was still held at Kongōju-ji, showing the continued esteem with which the temple was held.

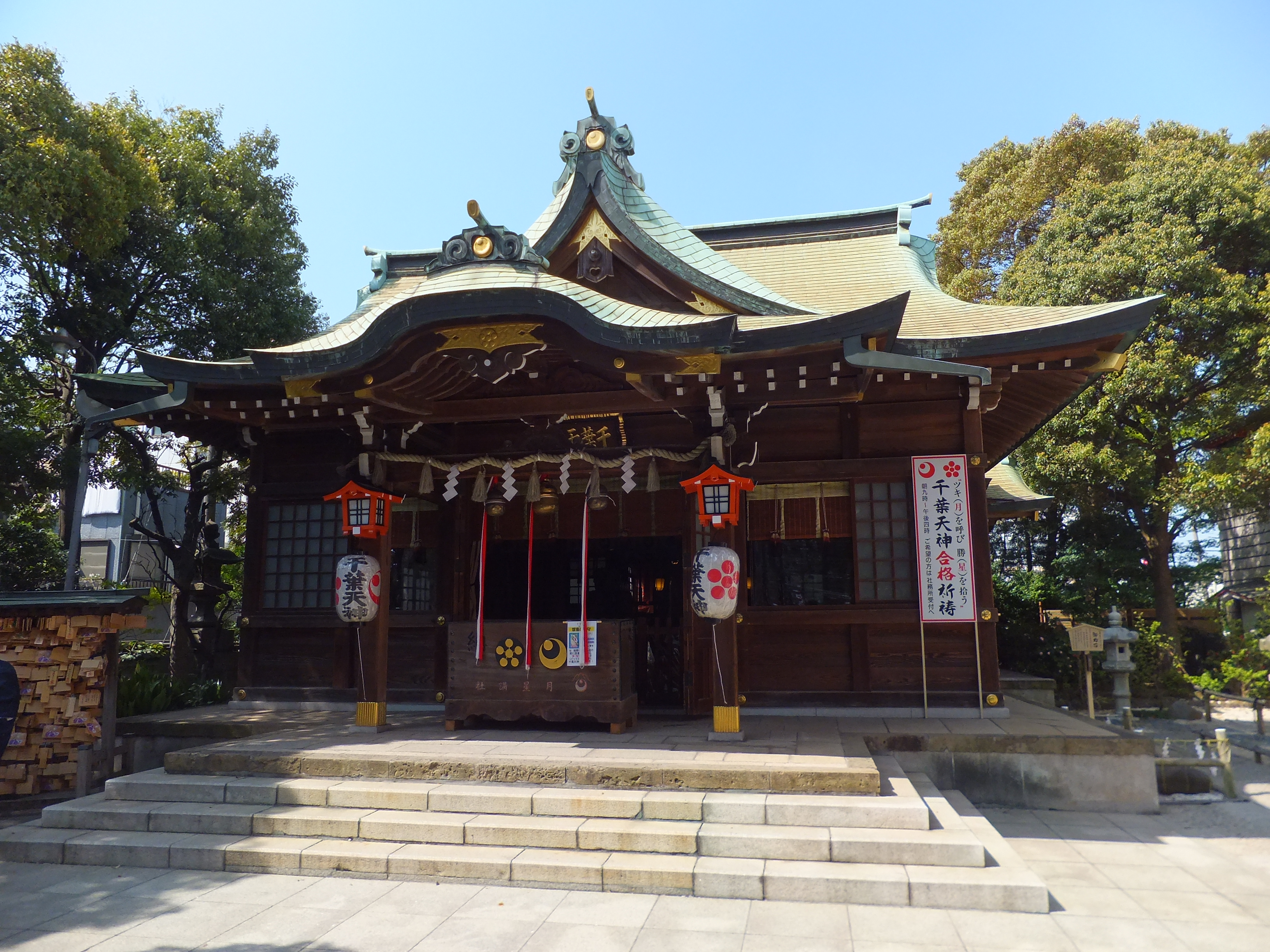
The shrine's former (1954) haiden, now an auxiliary shrine dedicated to Tenjin

In 1591 (Tenshō 19), Kongōju-ji received donations of land from Tokugawa Ieyasu, who also conferred to it the special privilege of direct audience with the shōgun (normally a prerogative of the shōgun's direct vassals, the fudai daimyō and the hatamoto). The temple subsequently became known as 'Myōken-ji' (妙見寺) during the Edo period.

In 1869 (Meiji 2), as a result of the edicts that called for the separation of Buddhism and Shinto, the temple - which featured a combination of both - was turned into a purely Shinto institution and renamed "Chiba Shrine", with its deity Myōken reidentified as Ame-no-Minakanushi.

In 1874 (Meiji 7), Chiba Shrine was raised to the rank of prefectural shrine or kensha (県社). In the same year, the shrine caught fire and burned to the ground. It was immediately rebuilt, but was again destroyed by fire in 1904 (Meiji 37). Reconstruction of the ruined edifices was finished ten years later, in 1914 (Taishō 4).

The shrine was destroyed a third time during the bombing of Chiba in 6–7 July 1945 (Shōwa 20) in the closing stages of World War II. It was rebuilt after the war and was completed in 1954 (Shōwa 29).

In 1990 (Heisei 2), the entire Chiba Shrine complex was renovated on a grand scale. The Sonjōden (尊星殿), the shrine compound's main gate, was completed in 1998 (Heisei 10).

== Structures ==
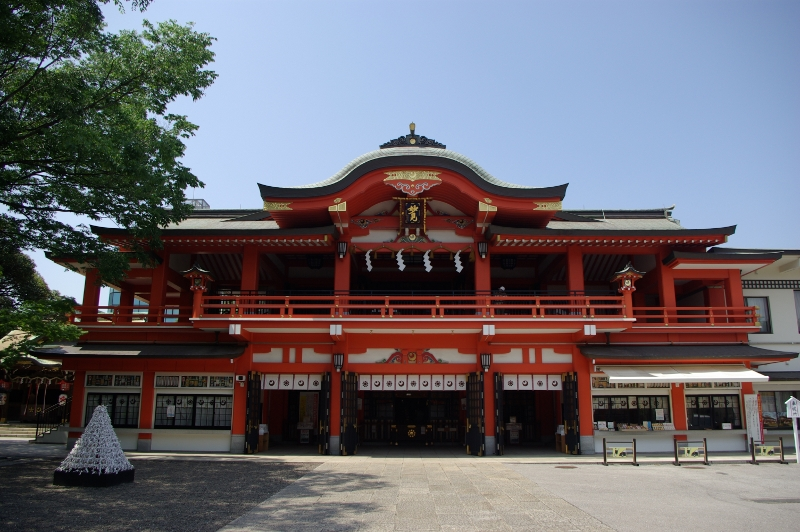
The current haiden

- Main shrine building

The two-story haiden - the first of its kind in Japan - was built in 1990, replacing the previous one dating from 1954. Both the ground floor, the Kongōden (金剛殿, "Hall of the Vajra"), and the upper floor, the Hokutoden (北斗殿, "Hall of the Big Dipper"), (Note: The two floors are named after the shrine's former name as a Buddhist temple: Hokutosan Kongōju-ji.) are open for public worship.

- Chiba Tenjin (千葉天神)

An auxiliary shrine dedicated to Tenjin, the deification of Heian period scholar and statesman Sugawara no Michizane revered as the patron of learning and scholarship, originally established within the Kongōju-ji complex in 1182 (Juei 1). During the 1990 renovation, the 1954 haiden was relocated and reused as a shrine building for Tenjin.

- Sonjōden (尊星殿, "Hall of the Venerable Star (King)")

The shrine's main entrance, a two-story gate (nijūmon) doubling as a sub-shrine to Ame-no-Minakanushi (Myōken) in his role as the presiding deity of the sun, moon and stars. On the first floor is the Fukutokuden (福徳殿, "Hall of Merit"), an octagonal shrine representing the Eight Trigrams (Bagua) and the twelve signs of the Chinese zodiac. The upper floor, the Kaiunden (開運殿, "Hall of Luck Improvement") is held to be especially imbued with the power of the deity and is only open a few times a year to devotees who request for formal prayer rituals (kitō) to be conducted there. Flanking the gate on either side are the Gettenrō (月天楼, "Tower of the Moon") and the Nittenrō (日天楼, "Tower of the Sun").

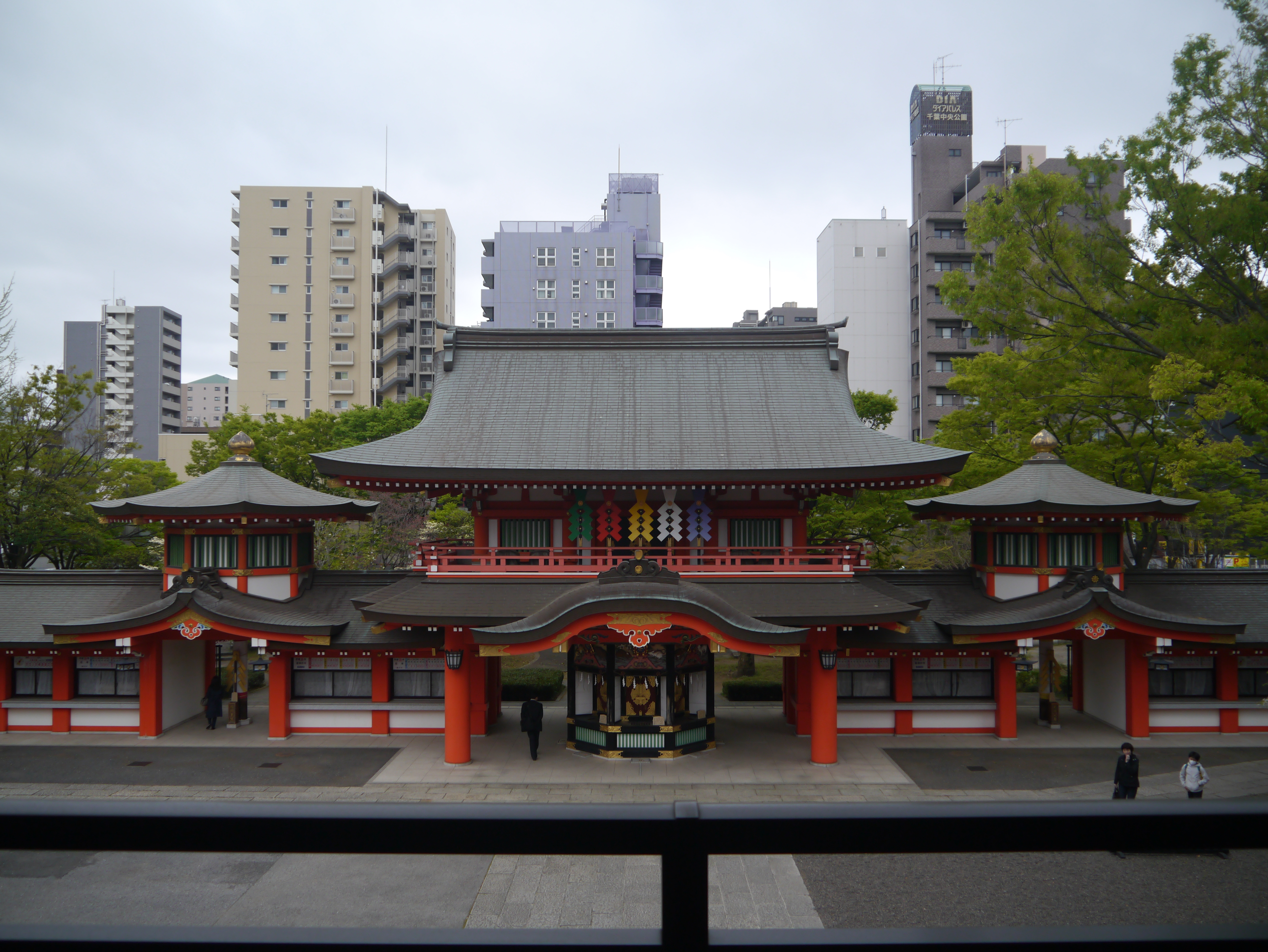
The Sonjōden as seen from the second floor of the main building

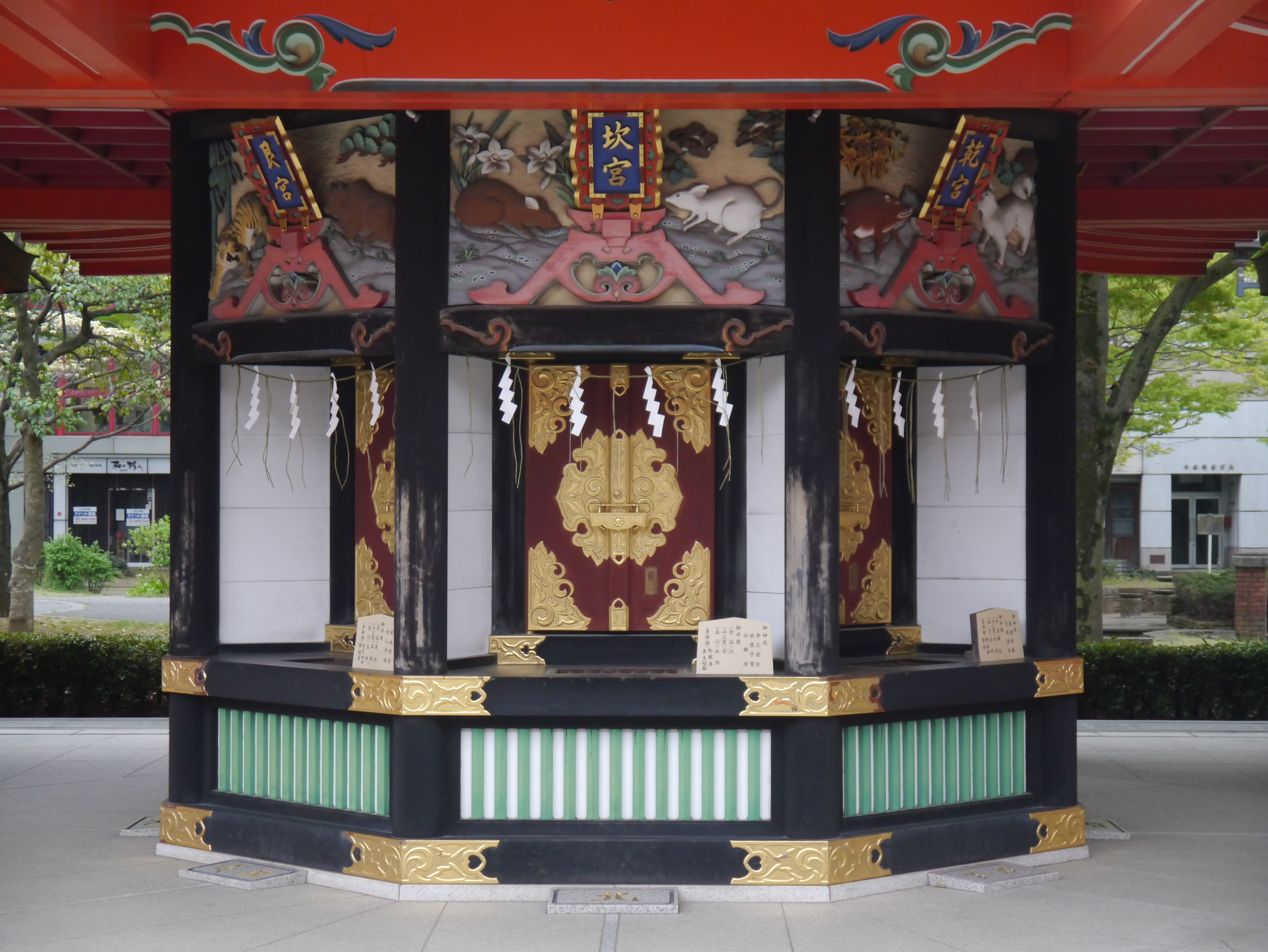
The Fukutokuden, the eight sides of which represent the Chinese Bagua

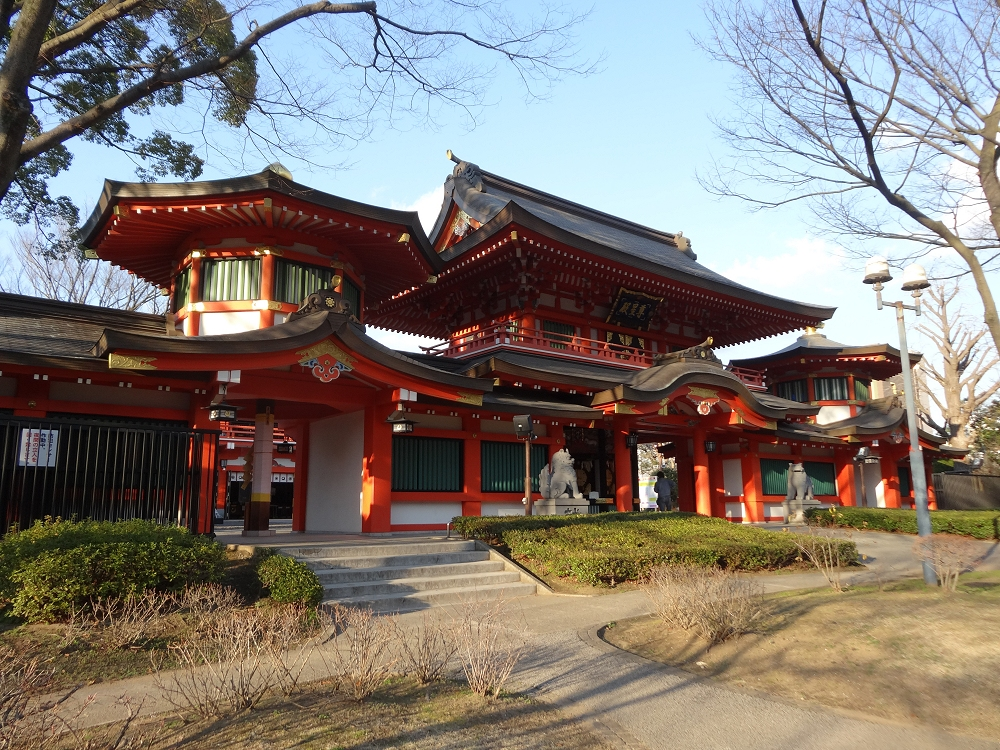
The Sonjōden as seen from the shrine exterior

- Chōzuya (手水舎)

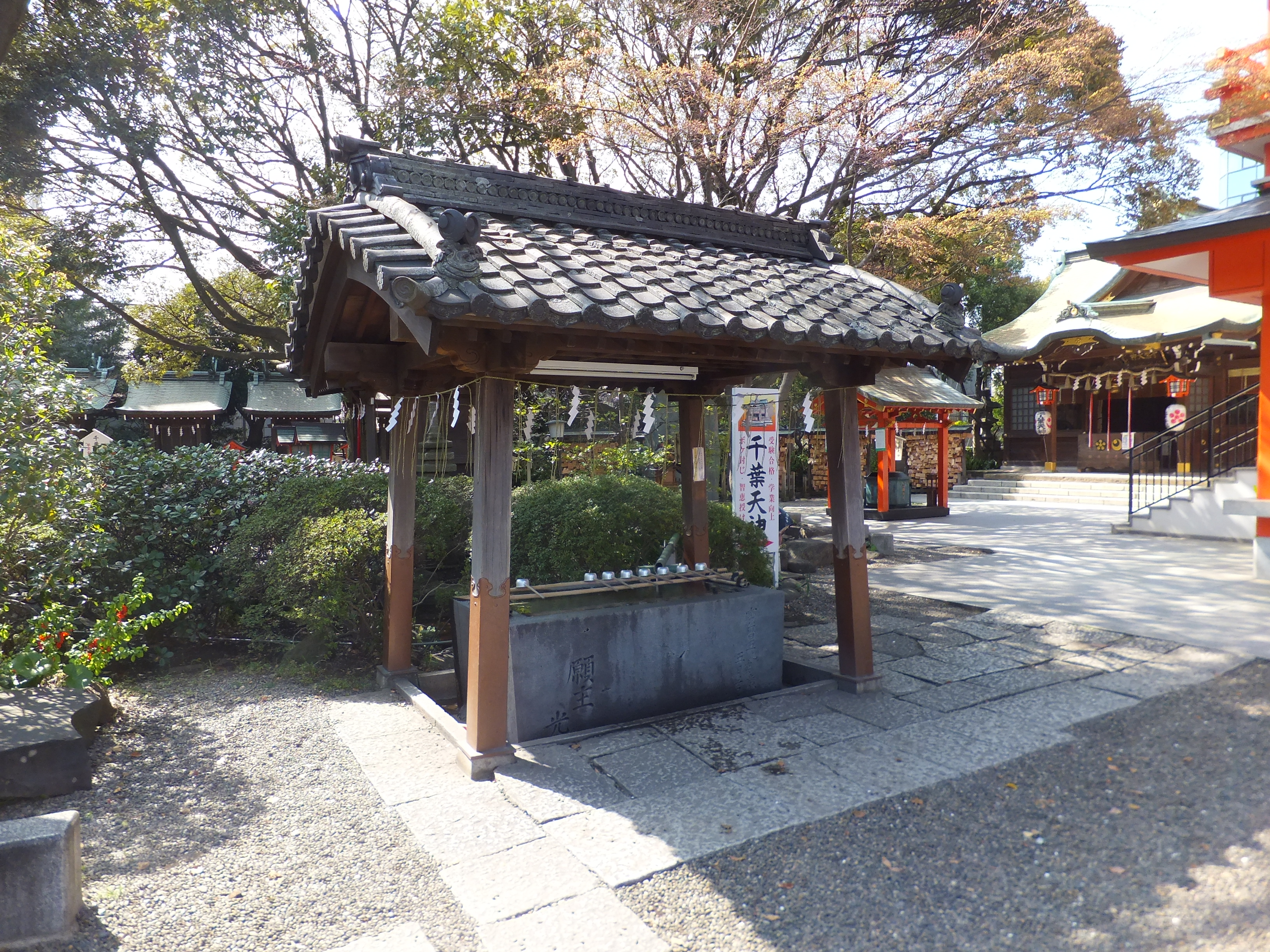
The shrine's chōzuya

This pavilion, dating from the Meiji period, was the only structure that survived the bombing of Chiba in 1945. The stone basin (chōzubachi) inside it dates from 1755 (Hōreki 5). The chōzuya's roof tiles were replaced in 2012 with exact replicas of the originals.

=== Auxiliary shrines ===
Chiba Shrine's auxiliary shrines (massha) are as follows:

- Innai Katori Shrine (院内香取神社, Innai Katori-jinja)

An auxiliary shrine to the warrior god Futsunushi located southeast of the Chiba Shrine compound, established in 885 (Ninna 1). The surrounding area, which includes the spot where Chiba Shrine stands, is traditionally considered to be the territory of this shrine. During the Myōken Taisai festival, Chiba Shrine's sacred palanquin (mikoshi) is brought to this auxiliary shrine before and after it is paraded across town, with the brass phoenix that adorns the mikoshi's roof being attached or removed here - an act of deferential respect to Futsunushi.

- Chiba Tenjin (see above)
- Uba Shrine (姥神社, Uba-jinja)

Dedicated to Myōken's wet nurse (乳母, uba). Reputed to date from the founding of Kongōju-ji, making it one of the oldest auxiliary shrines in the shrine complex.

- Hoshi Shrine (星神社, Hoshi-jinja)

Dedicated to the star god Ame-no-Kagaseo, established in 1182. Medieval and early modern documents refer to sanctuaries dedicated to the Twenty-Eight Lunar Mansions (二十八宿堂, Nijūhasshuku-dō) and the Thirty-Six Animals (三十六禽堂, Sanjūrokkin-dō) within the Kongōju-ji temple complex.

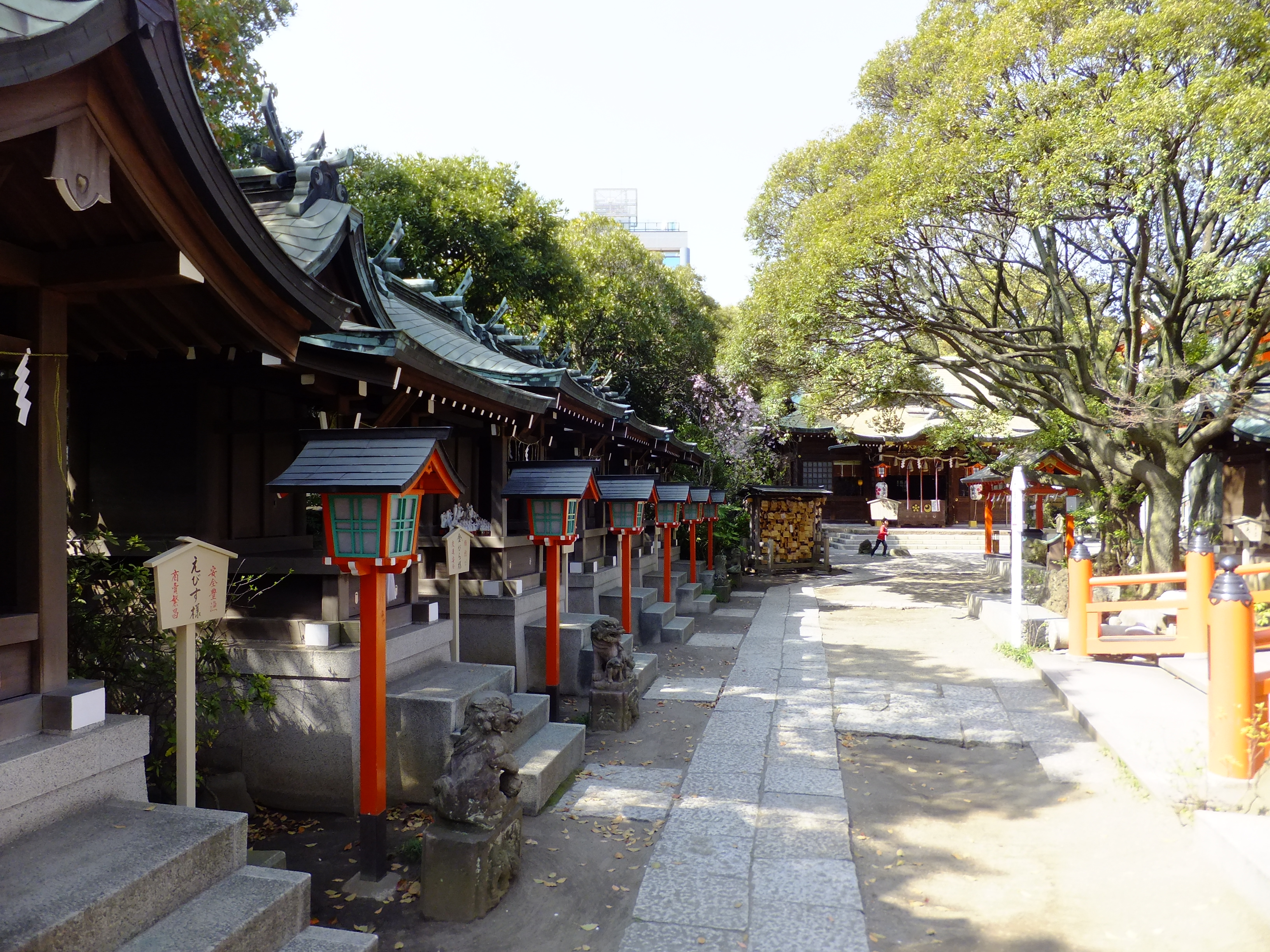
Auxiliary shrines (massha) within the shrine compound

- Ishi Shrine (石神社, Ishi-jinja)

Dedicated to Iwanagahime, the elder sister of Konohana-Sakuyahime, the goddess of Mount Fuji. Originally known as 'Ishigami' (石神) or 'Ishigami Daimyōjin' (石神大明神).

- Inari Shrine (稲荷神社, Inari-jinja)

Dedicated to the Inari deities Ukanomitama, Ukemochi (Ōgetsuhime), and Wakumusubi, established in 1179.

- Kotohira Shrine (金刀比羅宮)

Dedicated to the gods Kanayamahiko and Ōmononushi, established in 1840.

- Nishinomiya Shrine (西之宮)

A branch shrine of Nishinomiya Shrine in Nishinomiya, Hyōgo Prefecture, established in 1782. Enshrines Kotoshironushi (Ebisu).

- Hachiman Shrine (八幡神社, Hachiman-jinja)

Established in 1181 by Chiba Tsunetane, who enshrined a bunrei of Hachiman (the patron deity of the Minamoto clan) obtained from Tsurugaoka Hachimangū in Kamakura within the temple compound.

- Hie Shrine (日枝神社, Hie-jinja)

Dedicated to Oyamakui, established in 1182. Originally known as 'Sannō Gongen' (山王権現).

- Mitsumine Shrine (三峰神社, Mitsumine-jinja)

Dedicated to Izanami, established in 1822.

- Shinmei Shrine (神明社, Shinmei-sha)

A shrine to Amaterasu originally located in Yokomachi (part of modern Chūō-ku) and transferred to Chiba Shrine in 1882.

- Ontake Shrine (御嶽神社, Ontake-jinja)

This shrine, established in 1871 and dedicated to Kuni-no-Tokotachi, Ōyamatsumi, and Ninigi, is in the shape of a mountain topped with three statues representing its deities.

- Itsukushima Shrine (厳島神社, Itsukushima-jinja)

Dedicated to the goddess Ichikishimahime (originally Benzaiten), established in 1182.

- Mizu-no-Miya (美寿之宮, lit. "Shrine of Beautiful Longevity")

The most recent of the shrine's massha, established in 2009. Dedicated to the water deity Mizu-no-Mioya-no-Ōkami (水御祖大神, identified with the dragon deity Ryūjin). The name Mizu (美寿 lit. "beauty [and] longevity" or "beautiful longevity") is a pun on the Japanese word for water, mizu.

In addition to the above, historical records also refer to shrines to Seiryū Daigongen (清瀧大権現, the patron goddess of Daigo-ji in Fushimi-ku, Kyoto) and Marīcī (摩利支天 Marishiten), as well as a sanctuary dedicated to seven important personages related to the Chiba clan (Note: The four Taira ancestors of the Chiba (Yoshifumi, Masakado, Tadayori, and Tadatsune), Aihara Tsunetoki (粟飯原常時, a descendant of Yoshifumi's brother Yoshikane - claimed to be the one who carried the statue of Myōken from Sokusai-ji - who was appointed Kongōju-ji's shrine priest in 1126), and Tsunetoki's two daughters.) known as 'Sōdai-Shichisha Daimyōjin' (惣代七社大明神) within the temple complex.

== Festivals ==
- Myōken Taisai (妙見大祭 "Great Festival of Myōken", 16–22 August)

The shrine's annual main festival (reisai) held without interruption since 1127. During the festival, the shrine's mikoshi, called the Hōren (鳳輦, "phoenix palanquin"), is carried through the neighboring streets and deposited in a temporary shrine (御仮屋 okariya or mikariya) near the former site of Inohana Castle, where it will stay for a week before being brought back to the shrine. Also known as 'Hitokoto Myōken Taisai' (一言妙見大祭), after a belief that any 'single word' (hitokoto, i.e. succinct) wish will be granted during the festival season. Both the shrine and the festival have been designated as cultural assets by Chiba Prefecture.

== See also ==
- Astrotheology
- Chiba clan
- Shimōsa Province
- Taira clan
- Towatari Shrine
