= Ame-no-Minakanushi =

Japanese deity

- Kotoamatsukami
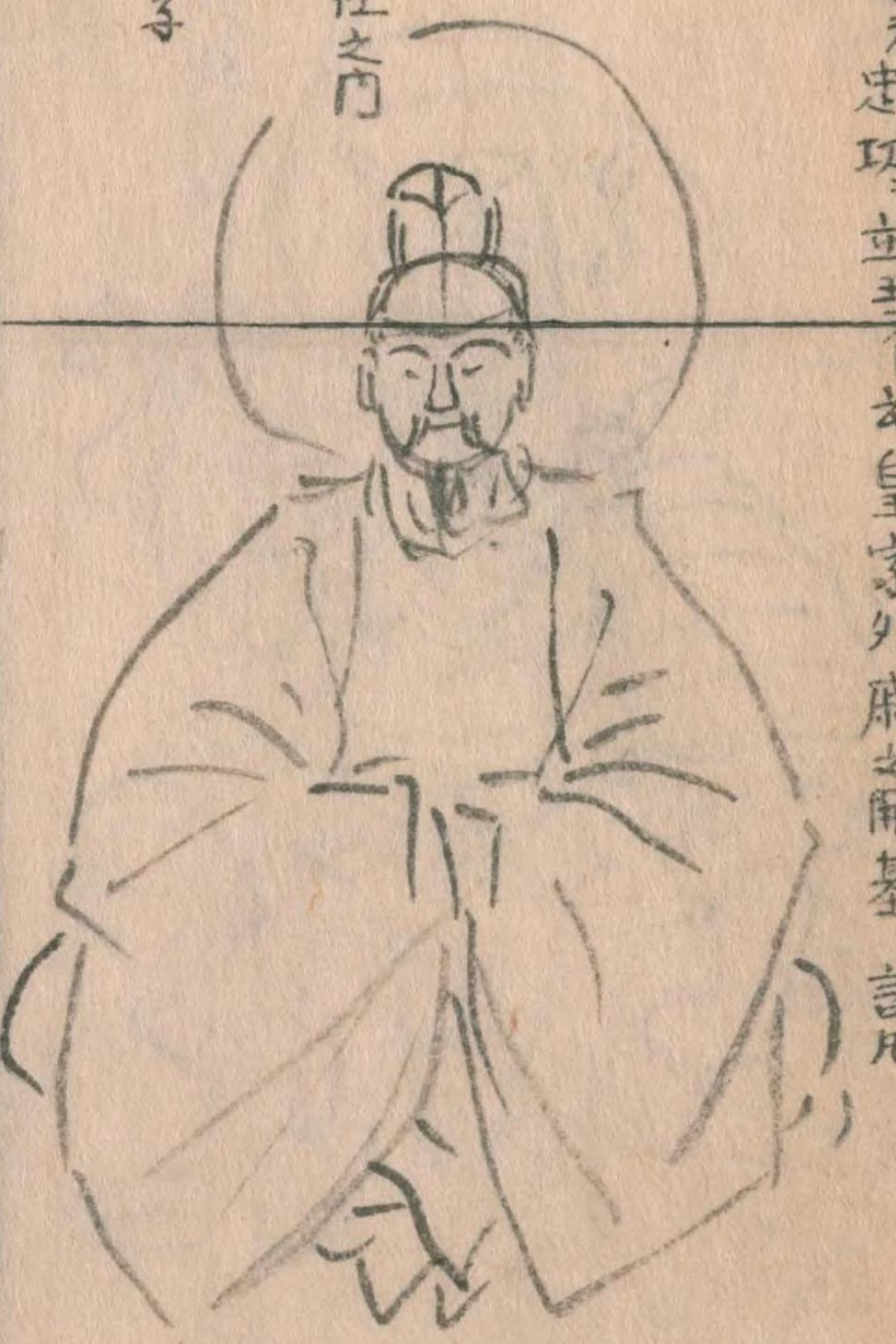
- Other names: Ame-no-Minakanushi-no-Mikoto (天御中主尊)
- Japanese: 天之御中主神, 天御中主神
- Major cult center: Chiba Shrine, Kurume Suitengū, and others
- Texts: Kojiki, Nihon Shoki, Kogo Shūi, Sendai Kuji Hongi

Genealogy
- Parents: None; self-generated
- Siblings: None
- Consort: None
- Children: None

Ame-no-Minakanushi (天之御中主, lit. "Lord of the August Center of Heaven") is a deity (kami) in Japanese mythology, portrayed in the Kojiki and the Nihon Shoki as the first or one of the first deities who manifested when heaven and earth came into existence.

== Name ==
The kami is given the name 'Ame-no-Minakanushi-no-Kami' (天之御中主神; Old Japanese: Ame_{2}-no_{2}-Mi_{1}nakanusi) in the Kojiki (ca. 712 CE). The same deity is referred to as 'Ame-no-Minakanushi-no-Mikoto' (天御中主尊) in a variant account cited in the Nihon Shoki (720 CE).

== Mythology ==
The Kojiki portrays Ame-no-Minakanushi as the first god to appear in the heavenly realm of Takamagahara after the emergence of heaven and Earth from the primeval chaos:

At the time of the beginning of heaven and earth, there came into existence in Takamanohara a deity named Ame-no-Minakanushi-no-Kami; next, Takamimusubi-no-Kami; next, Kamimusubi-no-Kami. These three deities all came into existence as single deities (hitorigami), and their forms were not visible (or 'they hid their bodies').

Unlike later generations of kami, the first seven gods were "single" or "solitary" in that they came into being one by one, without any counterparts, and are described as hiding their presence upon coming into existence. Ame-no-Minakanushi is reckoned as the first of the "three deities of creation" (造化三神, zōka sanshin) and one of the five "distinguished heavenly gods" (別天津神, kotoamatsukami).

In the Nihon Shoki's main narrative and many of the variant accounts cited in it, the first kami is identified instead as Kuni-no-Tokotachi; Ame-no-Minakanushi only appears in passing in one of these variants:

In one writing it is said:—"When Heaven and Earth began, there were Deities produced together, whose names were, first, Kuni-no-toko-tachi no Mikoto, and next Kuni no sa-tsuchi no Mikoto." It is further stated:—"The names of the Gods which were produced in the Plain of High Heaven were Ama no mi-naka-nushi no Mikoto, next Taka-mi-musubi no Mikoto, next Kami-mi-musubi no Mikoto."

— translation by William George Aston

In the Sendai Kuji Hongi, the first deity to appear is named 'Ame-Yuzuruhi-Ame-no-Sagiri-Kuni-Yuzurutsuki-Kuni-no-Sagiri-no-Mikoto' (天譲日天狭霧国禅月国狭霧尊). Here, Ame-no-Minakanushi – given the alias 'Ame-no-Tokotachi-no-Mikoto' (天常立尊; the name of a distinct kami in the Kojiki) – along with the deity Umashiashikabihikoji (宇摩志阿斯訶備比古遅神) is instead counted as the first generation that emerged after this god.

No further mention is made of Ame-no-Minakanushi in these texts.

	Kojiki	Nihon Shoki (main text)	Nihon Shoki (variant 2)	Nihon Shoki (variant 4)	Nihon Shoki (variant 6)	Sendai Kuji Hongi
The first generations of kami	(Kotoamatsukami); 1. Ame-no-Minakanushi; 2. Takamimusubi; 3. Kamimusubi; 4. Umashi-Ashikabi-Hikoji; 5. Ame-no-Tokotachi (Seven divine generations); 1. Kuni-no-Tokotachi; 2. Toyokumono; 3. Uijini, Suijini; 4. Tsunugui, Ikugui; 5. Ōtonoji, Ōtonobe; 6. Omodaru, Ayakashikone; 7. Izanagi, Izanami	(Seven divine generations); 1. Kuni-no-Tokotachi; 2. Kuni-no-Satsuchi; 3. Toyokumunu; 4. Uijini, Suijini; 5. Ōtonoji, Ōtomabe; 6. Omodaru, Kashikone; 7. Izanagi, Izanami	1. Umashi-Ashikabi-Hikoji; 2. Kuni-no-Tokotachi; 3. Kuni-no-Satsuchi	1. Kuni-no-Tokotachi; 2.Kuni no Satsuchi; (Emerged in Takamagahara); 1. Ame-no-Minakanushi; 2. Takamimusubi; 3. Kamimusubi	1. Ame-no-Tokotachi; 2. Umashi-Ashikabi-Hikoji	Ame-Yuzuruhi-Ame-no-Sagiri-Kuni-Yuzurutsuki-Kuni-no-Sagiri (Seven divine generations); 1. Ame-no-Minakanushi, Umashi-Ashikabi-Hikoji; 2. Kuni-no-Tokotachi, Toyokuninushi (Toyokumunu) + Ame-no-Yakudari: 3. Tsugunui, Ikugui + Ame-no-Mikudari; 4. Uijini, Suijini + Ameai; 5. Ōtonoji, Ōtomabe + Ame-no-Yaohi; 6. Aokashikine (Omotaru), Ayakashikine (Kashikone) + Ame-no-Yasorodama; 7. Izanagi, Izanami + Takamimusubi, Kamimusubi, Ikumusubi, Tsuhayamusubi, Furutama, Yorotama

=== Descendants ===
An imperially commissioned genealogical record known as the Shinsen Shōjiroku (815 CE) identifies two clans as the progeny of deities descended from Ame-no-Minakanushi:

- The Hattori no Muraji (服部連) clan, descended from Ame-no-Mihoko (天御桙命), the 11th generation descendant of Ame-no-Minakanushi
- The Miteshiro no Obito (御手代首) clan, descended from Ame-no-Minakanushi's 10th generation descendant Ame-no-Morokami (天諸神命)

== Analysis ==
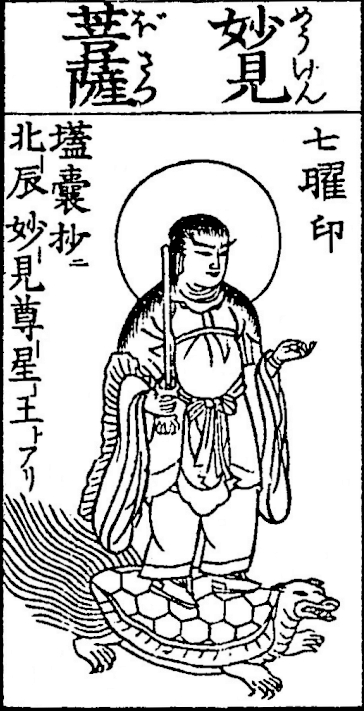
Myōken, the Buddhist deification of the North Star and/or the Big Dipper

There is no extant undisputed record of Ame-no-Minakanushi being worshiped at any known ancient shrines (the Engishiki, compiled in the early 10th century, never mentions any shrines to this deity); this, combined with the lack of information concerning the god outside of documents associated with the imperial court such as Kojiki and the Shoki (as seen above, even in these texts, barely any mention is made of this god), has led some scholars to consider Ame-no-Minakanushi to be an abstract deity (i.e. a god that only exists on paper, with no actual worshipers or cult dedicated to him) created under the influence of Chinese thought. Other scholars, however, argue that the paucity of evidence for the worship of Ame-no-Minakanushi in antiquity does not necessarily mean that the god is purely a literary invention.

Konishi Jin'ichi (1984) saw the creation narratives of the Kojiki and the Shoki as a combination of three different traditions: one which traces the origin of the gods to Ame-no-Minakanushi, another that began with Umashi-Ashikabi-Hikoji, and a third one starting with Kuni-no-Tokotachi. He saw similarities between Ame-no-Minakanushi and the sky deities Tangaloa (Polynesian mythology) and Tengri (Turkic and Mongol mythology), suggesting that these myths may ultimately share a common origin.

Kawai Hayao compared Ame-no-Minakanushi with the moon deity Tsukuyomi and Hosuseri (one of Konohanasakuyahime's three children), in that all three are portrayed as belonging to a triad of important deities and yet are not recorded as doing anything of significance. He considered these three 'inactive' deities to serve a mythic function as the 'hollow center' acting as a buffer zone between two opposite or conflicting forces (Kamimusubi and Takamimusubi, Amaterasu and Susanoo, Hoderi and Hoori).

=== During the medieval and early modern periods ===
Until the medieval era, the Nihon Shoki, owing to its status as one of the six national histories, was more widely read and commented upon than the Kojiki, which was regarded as an ancillary work. In a similar vein, the Sendai Kuji Hongi, due to its preface claiming it to be compiled by Prince Shōtoku and Soga no Umako, was seen as being earlier and more reliable. (Modern consensus holds the Kuji Hongi to actually have been compiled during the Heian period, although certain portions of it may indeed preserve genuine early traditions.) References to Ame-no-Minakanushi were thus solely in terms of his role as one of the primeval kami.

Yoshida Kanetomo, the founder of the Yoshida Shintō sect, identified Kuninotokotachi with Amenominakanushi and regarded him as the primordial god of the Universe.

During the Kamakura period, the school of thought developed by the Watarai priestly house of the Outer Shrine of Ise (Gekū) known as Ise Shinto (also known as Watarai Shinto), identified the shrine's deity, Toyouke (Toyoukehime), with Ame-no-Minakanushi and Kuni-no-Tokotachi. By doing so, the Outer Shrine asserted superiority over the Inner Shrine (Naikū) and its goddess, Amaterasu.

It was upon the flourishing of nativist studies (kokugaku) and the rediscovery and reappraisal of the Kojiki in the Edo period that Ame-no-Minakanushi's significance was reevaluated, with different authors expressing their own opinions on the god's role and importance.

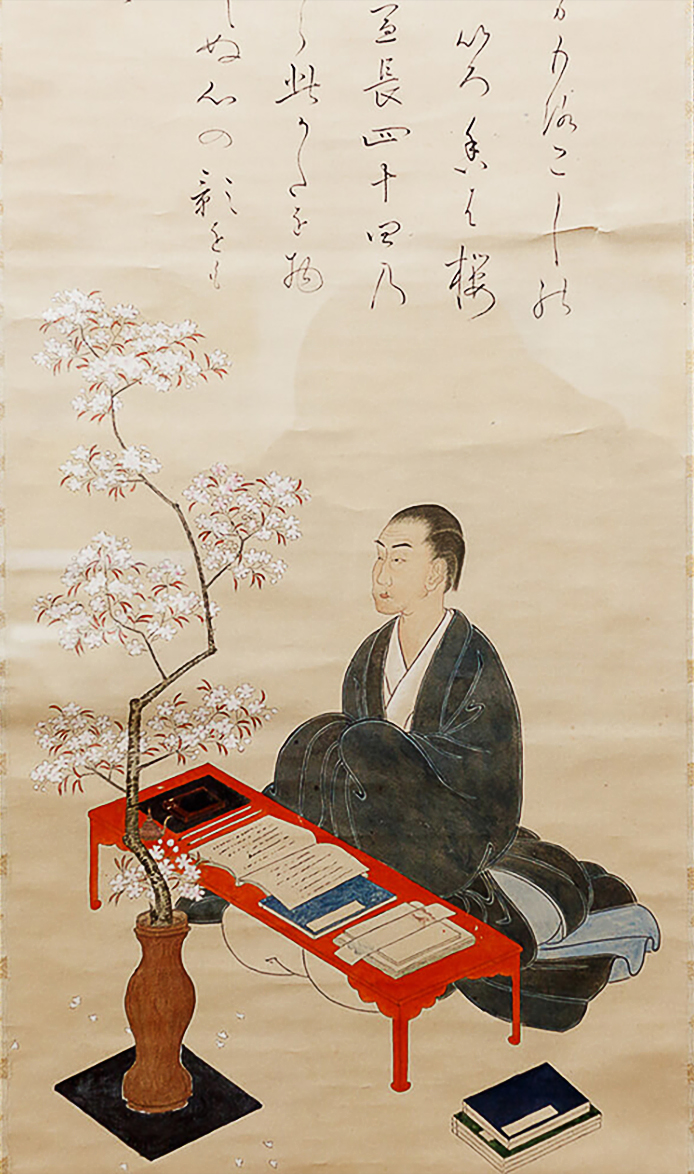
Motoori Norinaga (self-portrait)

Motoori Norinaga, in his commentary on the Kojiki, criticized the Watarai priesthood for laying emphasis on the importance of Ame-no-Minakanushi, arguing that the deities' order of appearance in time has no bearing on their rank or status. In his view, while Ame-no-Minakanushi is indeed the first among the gods to manifest, he is neither the ruler of heaven nor the "first ancestor" of the imperial line (that being Amaterasu), as some in his time believed. Motoori instead characterized Takamimusubi and Kamimusubi as the "first ancestors of heaven and earth, of the kami, and of all existence."

Tsurumine Shigenobu (1788-1859), who attempted to make a rational interpretation of the creation myths of the Kojiki and Shoki based on a synthesis with his understanding of European science and astronomy, associated Ame-no-Minakanushi with gravity:

These three kami are first, Amanominakanushi, secondly Takamimusubi, and thirdly, Kamimusubi. These three great kami are described in the body of the Kojiki with the words, "These three kami were produced alone, and hid themselves." The meaning of "hid themselves" is that they could not be perceived by human eyes. The fact that there are particles [bunshi] in all things is probably a result of the action of the [kami] of productive power (Mimusubi), while the fact there is gravity is a result of the action of [the kami] Minakanushi. This gravity cannot be seen with eyes or taken up in the hand, and like the attraction between magnets and iron, is something that mutually pulls and attracts things together. It is because of the existence of this gravity that particles coalesce and thus the Sun, Moon, planets and Earth spontaneously take their proper form. As a result, when someone speaks of the "land illumined with heavenly crimson shining", it was due to the actions of these three kami that [that land] came into being. Thus, while these three kami are said to have become in the Plain of High Heaven, it does not mean literally there was originally a place called the Plain of High Heaven, and that the kami then came into being within that place, but rather that the Plain of High Heaven itself emerged into existence by virtue of the fact that these three kami came into being. Now, when one speaks of Amenominakanushi no kami, the amenominaka means around the core of the Sun, while nushi means the lord of that place, with result that the name means the one who makes its domain in heaven and Earth.

By linking gravity to Ame-no-Minakanushi, Tsurumine identifies the deity as the "lord" who oversees the process whereby the activity of the two gods of "coalescing" (musubi) results in the creation of all things out of the basic elements represented by "particles." Using language apparently borrowed from Christian conceptions of God, Tsurumine then went on to describe the three deities of creation as "the ancient ancestral kami of heaven and great kami sovereign over first origins ... who have made all things, from sun and moon, the planets, and earth to every other thing."

Motoori's admirer and self-proclaimed disciple Hirata Atsutane, in contrast to Motoori, described Ame-no-Minakanushi as a supreme deity with no beginning and no end who holds sovereignty over all existence, residing in the pole star at the very center of heaven.

All things in heaven and earth have an original, great ancestral kami. Its name is Amenominakanushi no kami. It has no beginning and no end. It abides in the heavens above. It is furnished with the quality of producing all things within heaven and earth, but it acts not and is quiescent (it dwells in the so-called Plain of High Heaven from the original beginning), and it is sovereign over all existence. Next are Takamimusubi no kami and Kamimusubi no kami. They are apportioned with the qualities of Amenominakanushi no kami, producing all things in heaven and Earth, and exerting sovereignty over all things in heaven and Earth. They are equipped with the immeasurably marvelous quality called the spirit of generation (musubi). They are the ultimate natural ancestral kami of human beings. These two ancestral deities then forged heaven and Earth, giving birth to Izanagi no mikoto and Izanami no mikoto, and making them firm the land and give birth to the people. These are our great natural parent deities.

A number of Hirata's disciples, meanwhile, came to formulate different understandings of Ame-no-Minakanushi from their mentor. One such disciple, Mutobe Yoshika (1798-1864), for instance argued that all the stars in the sky have their own planetary system similar to the Sun; the Kojiki's description of the generation of heaven and Earth thus does not refer to the entire cosmos as Hirata interpreted it, but the Solar System (which Mutobe equates with the mythical Takamagahara) alone. According to Mutobe, all the stars with their respective planetary system were formed by the three deities of creation, who then came down to dwell in the Solar System. Unlike Hirata, Mutobe relegated Ame-no-Minakanushi and the other two deities of creation to a minor role and instead accorded high status to the earthly deity Ōkuninushi, who he argued was given jurisdiction by the gods Takamimusubi and Amaterasu not only over the lives and fates of human beings but also over grains and other foods. He thus took the evaluation Hirata had given to the three kami of creation and reapplied it to Ōkuninushi, essentially elevating him to a kind of supreme deity.

== Worship ==
The Buddhist deity Myōken, who was worshiped in Japan since at least the 7th century, became conflated with Ame-no-Minakanushi during the early modern period due to Myōken's association with the Big Dipper and the northern pole star. When the Meiji government mandated the separation of Buddhism and Shinto, many shrines dedicated to Myōken became shrines to Ame-no-Minakanushi. Ame-no-Minakanushi was also one of the patron deities of the Taikyo Institute (大教院, Taikyoin), a short-lived government organization that promoted a state-sponsored fusion of Buddhism and Shinto after the earlier separation policy was deemed as being too divisive.

In the Oomoto religious text Michi no Shiori, written by Deguchi Onisaburo in 1904, the Supreme God of the universe is identified as Ame-no-Minakanushi. Deguchi, in turn, derived this idea from Honda Chikaatsu's teachings.

Ame-no-Minakanushi is one of the main deities worshipped at Seicho-No-Ie shrines.

== See also ==
- Kuni-no-Tokotachi
- Myōken
- Sky father
- Suitengū
- Taiji
- Toyouke-Ōmikami
- Yin and yang

Counterparts of Ame-no-Minakanushi in other cultures

- Adi Buddha, the Buddhist counterpart.
- Haneullim, the Korean counterpart.
- Hiranyagarbha, the Hindu counterpart.
- Jade Emperor, the Chinese counterpart.
- Ông Trời, the Vietnamese counterpart.
- Yuanshi Tianzun, the Taoist counterpart.

== Sources ==
- Joseph Mitsuo Kitagawa. On Understanding Japanese Religion. Princeton University Press, 1987. ISBN 0691102295
