= Mount Haku (Hyōgo) =

Mountain in Japan

- 白山
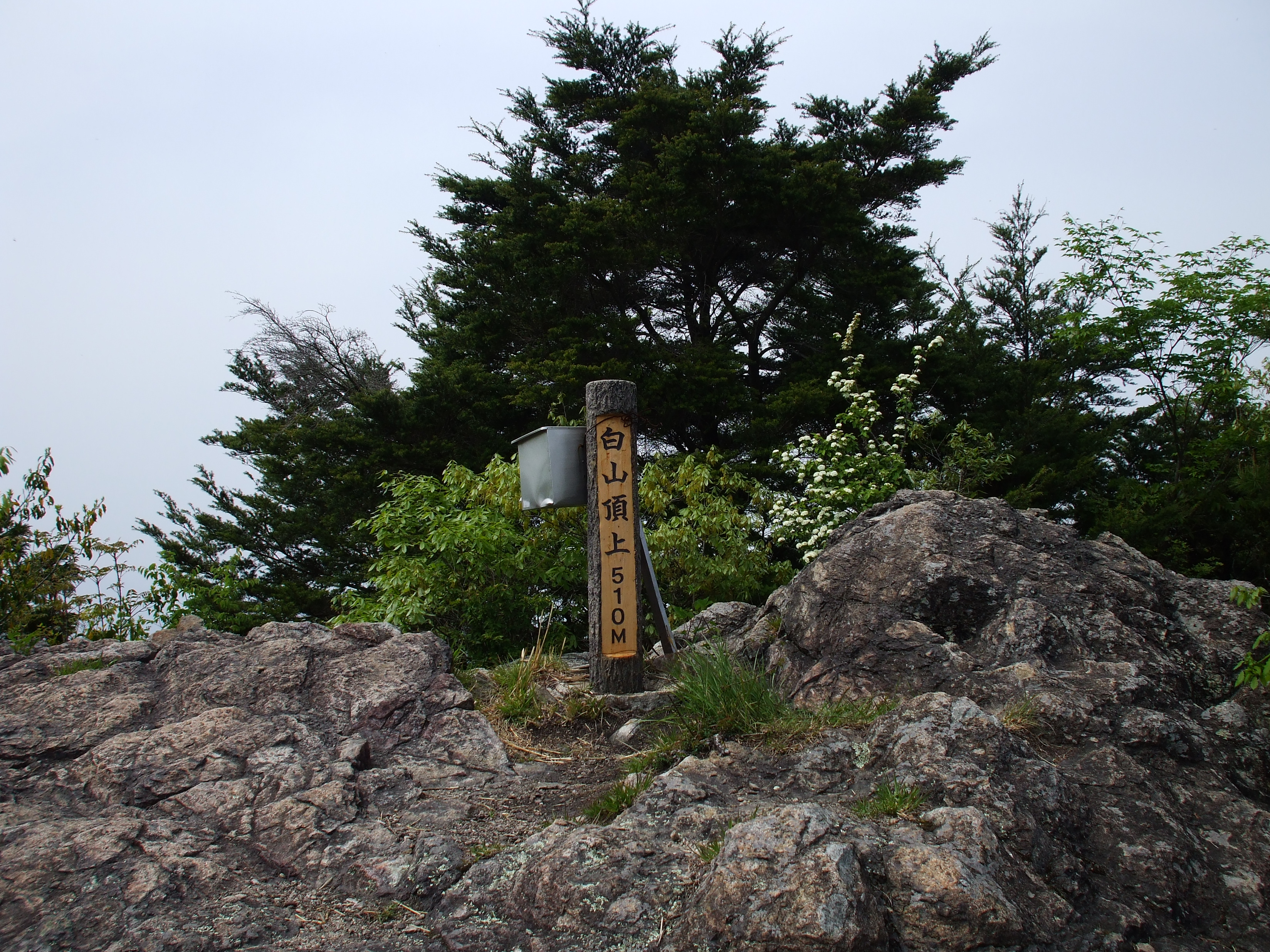
- Top of Mt. Haku June 2007

Highest point
- Elevation: 510 m (1,670 ft)
- Prominence: 142 m (466 ft)
- Parent peak: Mount Myōken (妙見山)
- Listing: List of mountains and hills of Japan by height
- Coordinates: 35°2′50″N 135°1′19″E

Naming
- English translation: White Mountain
- Language of name: Japanese
- Pronunciation: Japanese: [haꜜkɯ̥saɴ]

Geography
- Location: Nishiwaki, Hyōgo Prefecture, Japan
- Parent range: Chūgoku Mountains
- Topo map(s): Geographical Survey Institute, 25000:1 谷川, 50000:1 篠山

Mount Haku (白山, Haku-san) is a mountain in Nishiwaki, Hyōgo Prefecture, Japan. This mountain is one of the Hyōgo 50 Mountains.

== Outline ==
Mount Haku is a mountain in the Chūgoku Mountains. The name Hakusan is from the name of the shrine, "Hakusan Gongen," which was on the top of the mountain. The Hakusan Gongen was a branch of a sect of Shinto, whose center is on the top of Mount Haku with the same name, on the border of Ishikawa, Fukui and Gifu prefectures. Mount Haku was a center of Shugendō in this region, and Sogon-ji on the foot of the mountain was a place for worship to this mountain

== Access ==
- Honkuroda Station of JR West Kakogawa Line
