= Hōun-ji (Kami) =

Coordinates: 35.4706°N 134.595°E

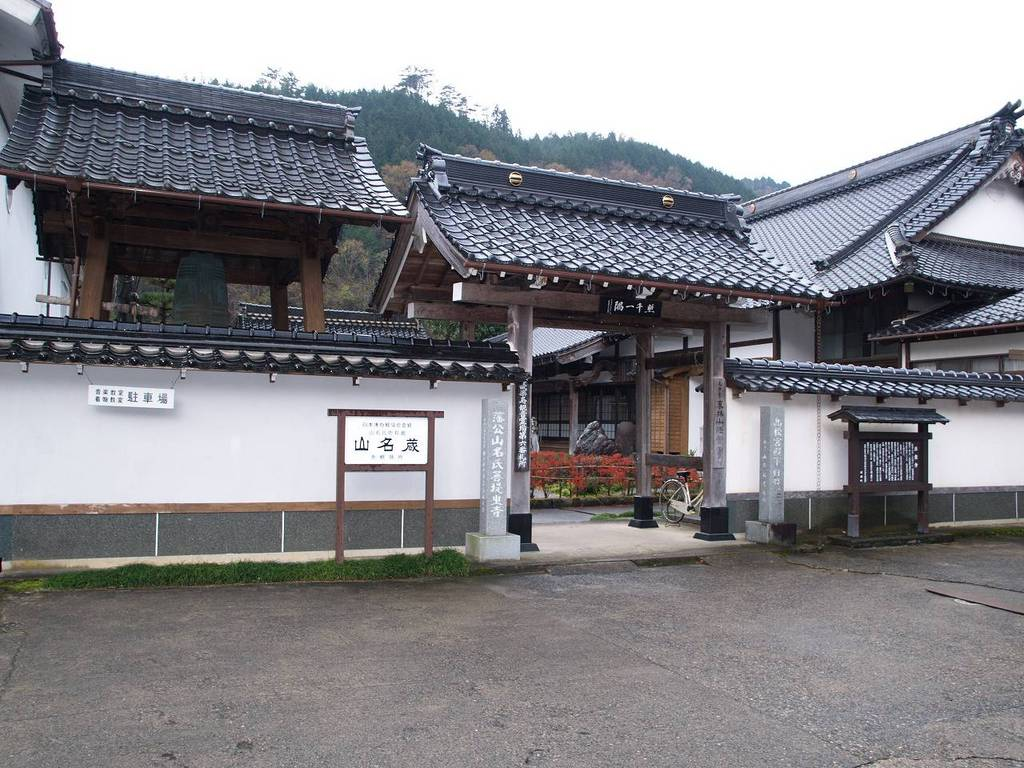
- Entrance to Hōun-ji

Religion
- Affiliation: Tendai sect
- Deity: Śākyamuni (Buddha)

Location
- Location: Muraoka-ku, Kami, Hyogo, Japan
- Country: Japan
- Interactive map of Hōun-ji

Architecture
- Founder: Unknown

Website
- http://www.houun.jp/ Hōun-ji

Hōun-ji (法雲寺) is a Tendai Buddhist temple in Hyōgo Prefecture (formerly Harima province).
