= Mount Myōken (Tajima) =

Mountain in Hyōgo Prefecture, Japan

- 妙見山
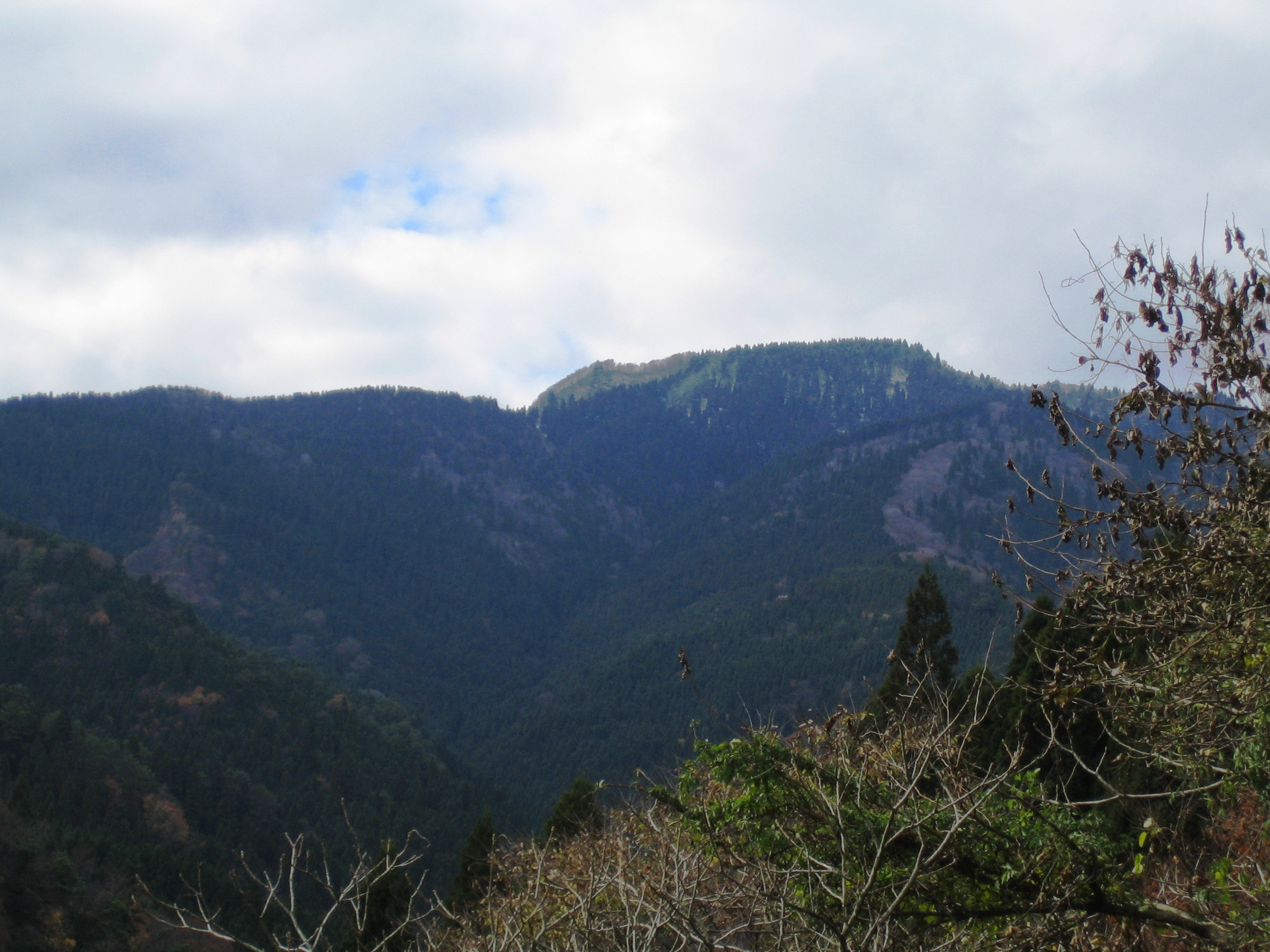
- Mount Myōken from the east

Highest point
- Elevation: 1,135.5 m (3,725 ft)
- Listing: List of mountains and hills of Japan by height
- Coordinates: 35°24′39″N 134°38′41″E

Naming
- Language of name: Japanese
- Pronunciation: [mjoːkensaɴ]

Geography
- Location within Japan
- Location: On the border of Yabu, Hyogo and Kami, Mikata, Hyogo, Japan
- Parent range: Chūgoku Mountains

Mount Myōken (妙見山, Myōken-san) is a 1,135.5 m (3,725 ft) mountain on the border of Yabu and Kami, Mikata, Hyogo, Japan. This mountain is one of Hyōgo 50, and a part of Hyonosen-Ushiroyama-Nagisan Quasi-National Park. The other name of this mountain is Mount Ishihara.

== Outline ==
Mount Myōken is a mountain on the eastern edge of the Chūgoku Mountains. Nikkōin temple is located at the base of the mountain. Originally, the temple was halfway up the mountain, but the Haibutsu-Kishaku Order issued during the Meiji-era forced the move.

== Route ==
This mountain has major two routes to the top. One is from Ishihara Bus Stop of Tantō Bus. The other is from Mount Sobu. From Ishihara Bus Stop, it takes about three hours to the top.

== Access ==
- Ishihara Bus Stop of Tantō Bus

== Gallery ==
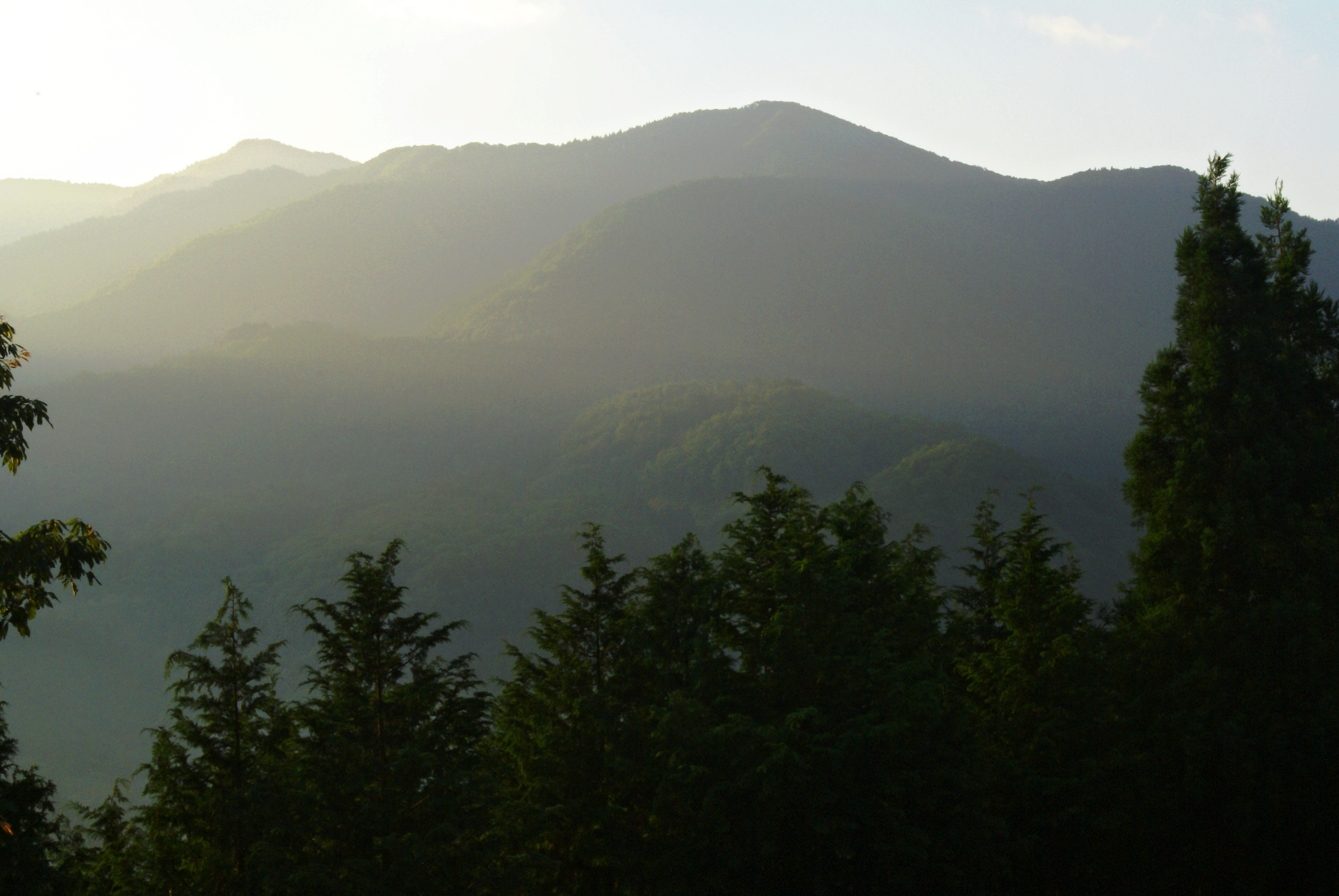
Mount Myōken from WNW

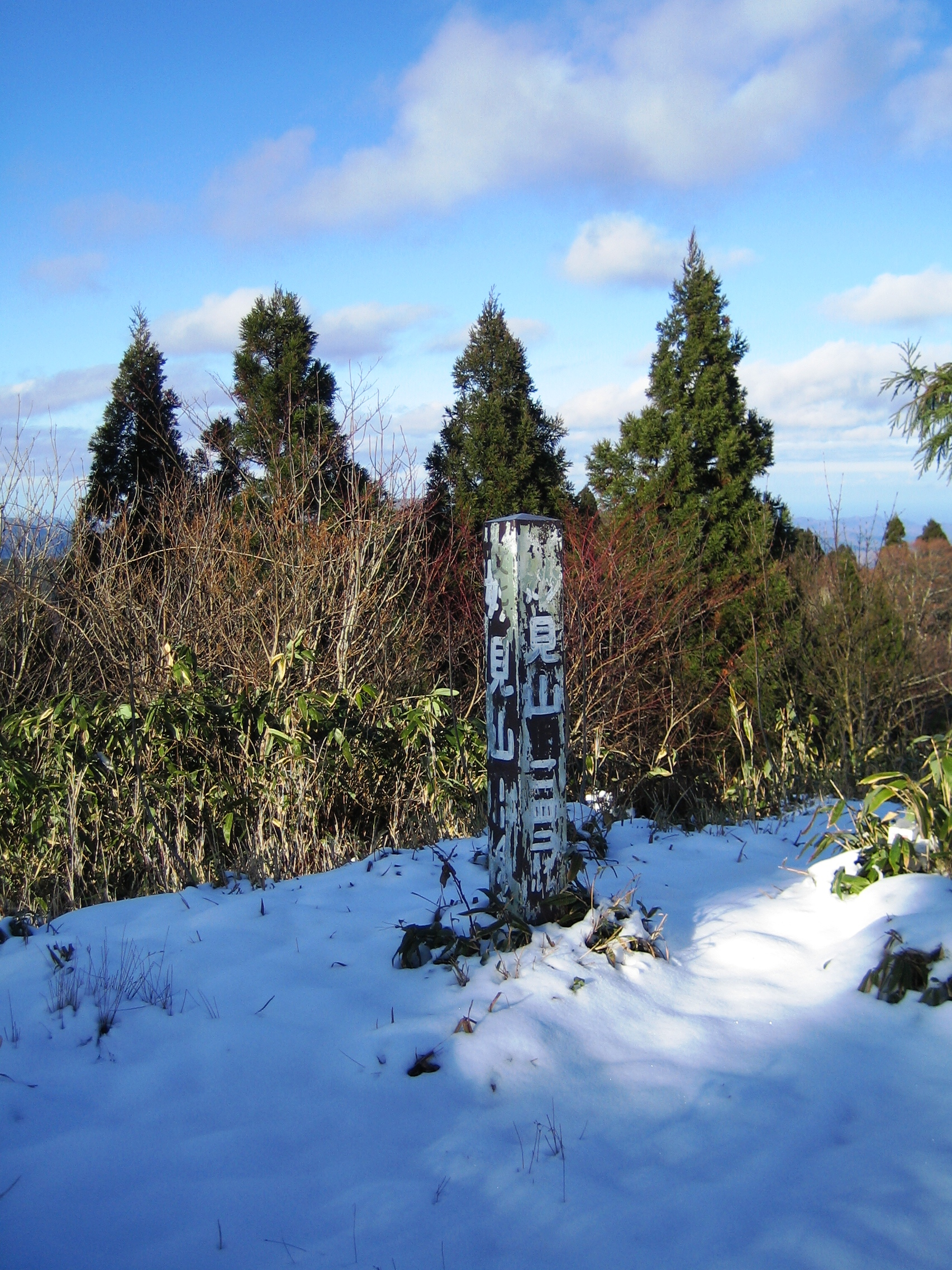
The top of Mount Myōken

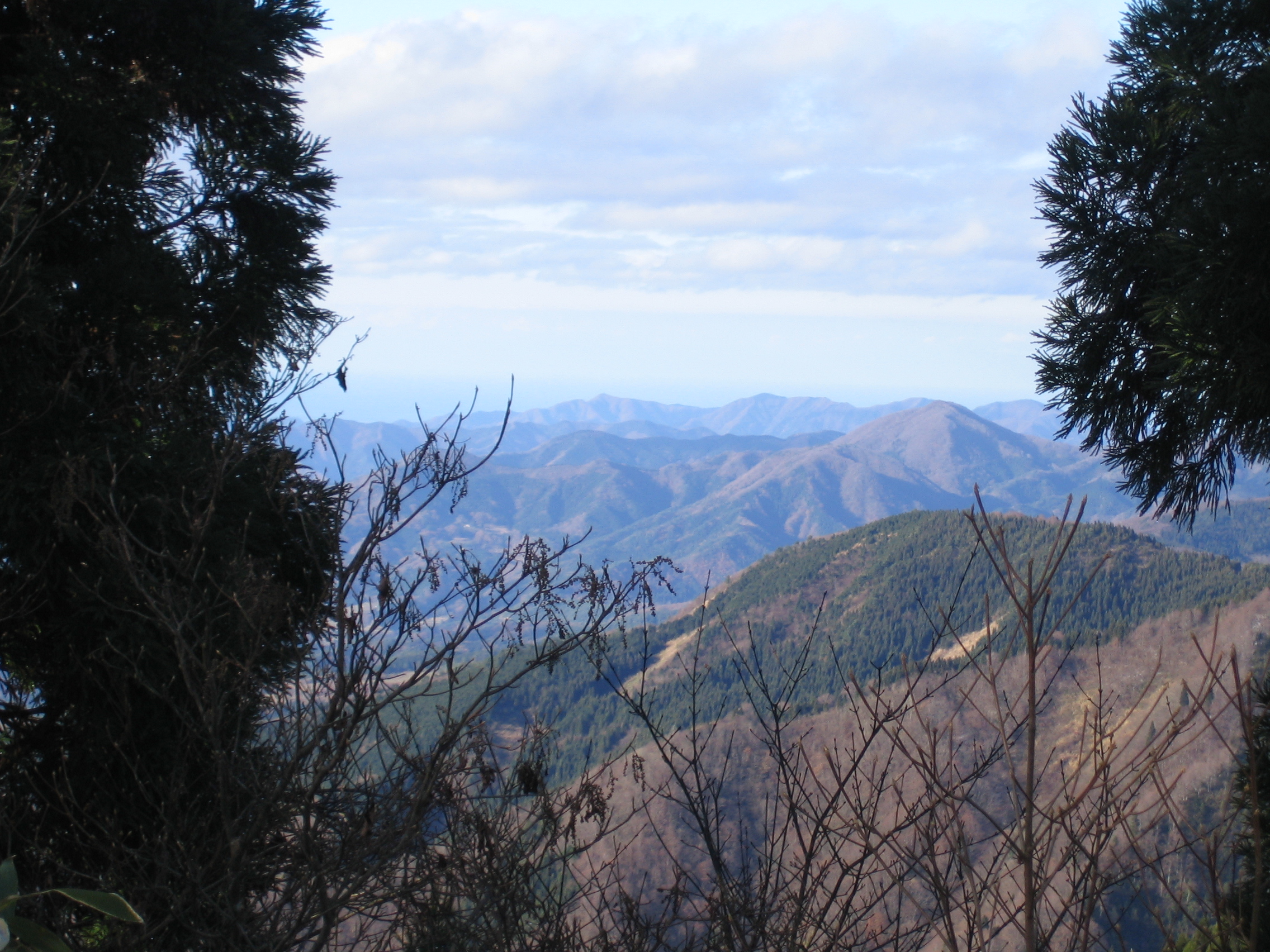
Looking NNW from the top of Mount Myōken

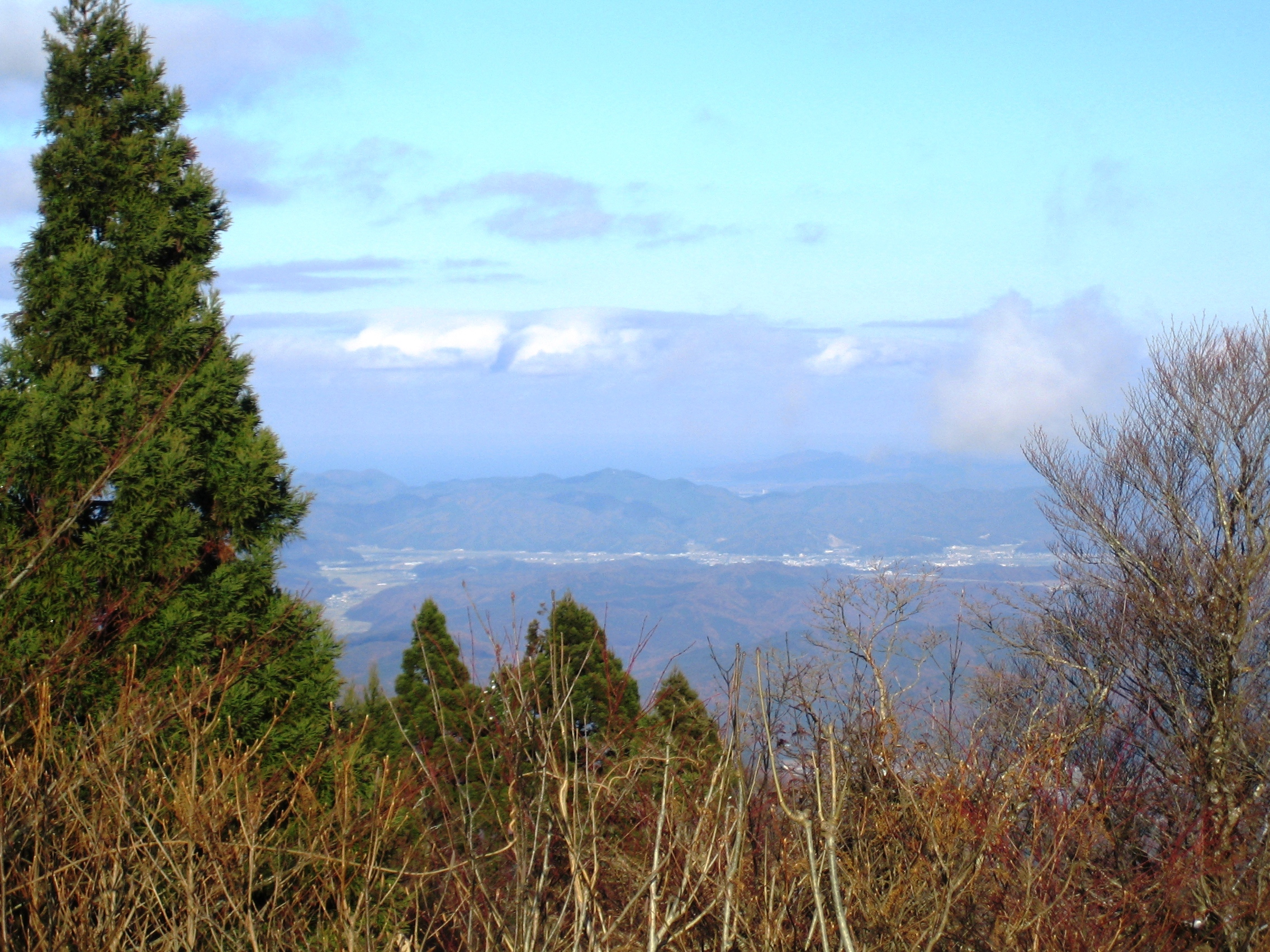
Looking NE from the top of Mount Myōken

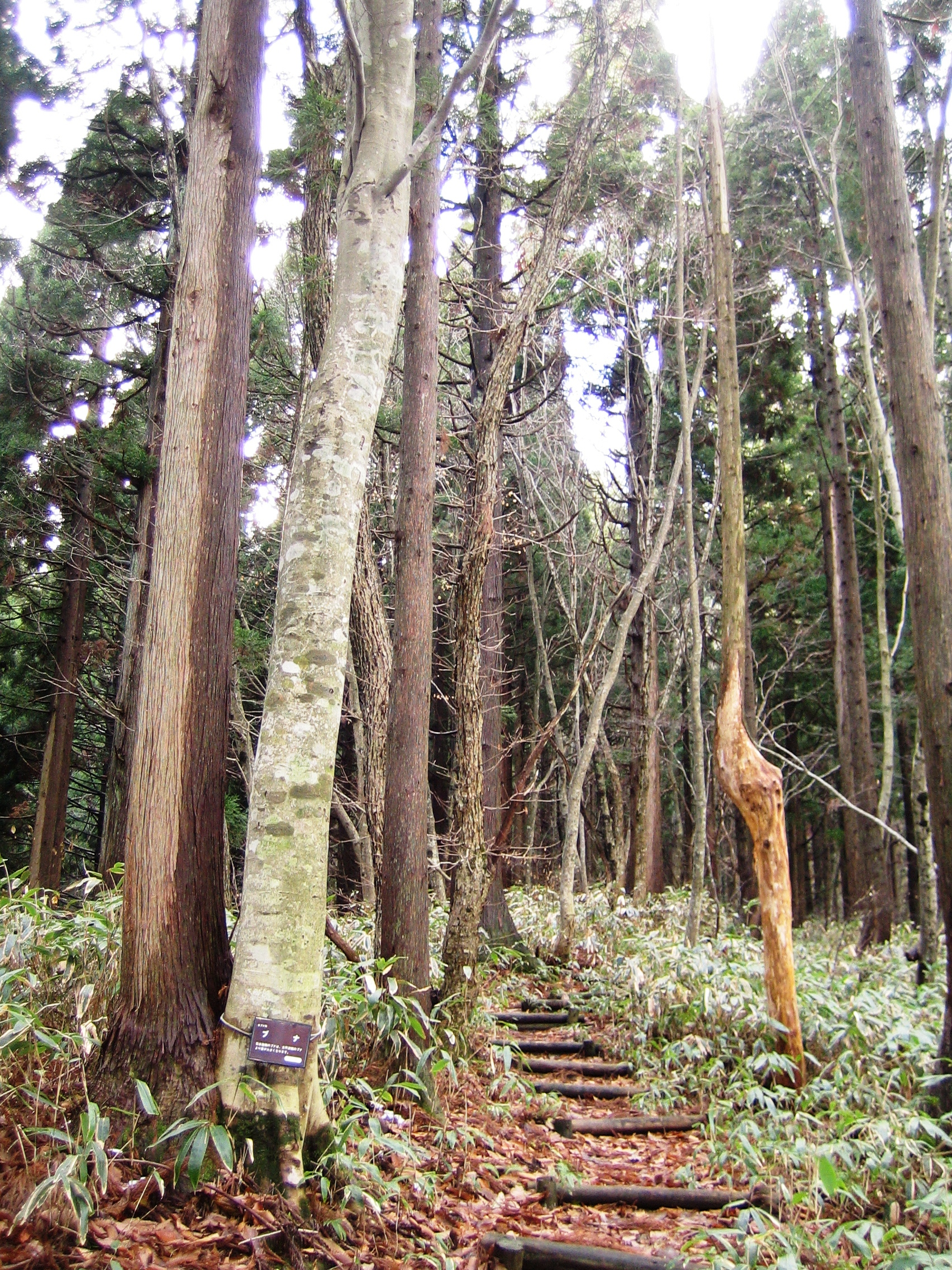
Forest of Mount Myōken

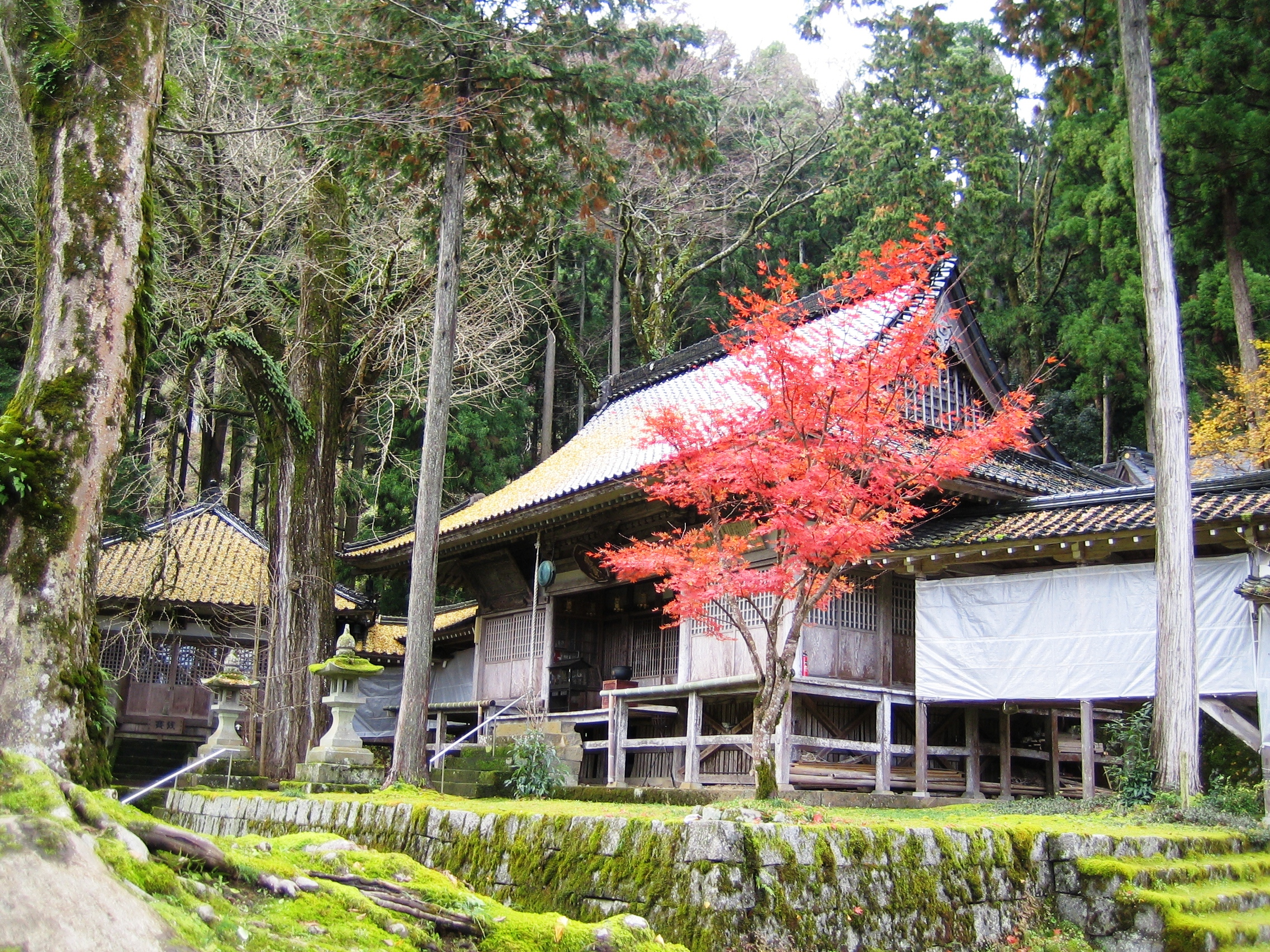
At the Nikkōin temple at the foot of Mount Myōken
