= Chiba (city) =

Chiba 千葉市
- Prefecture capital and Designated city
- Chiba City
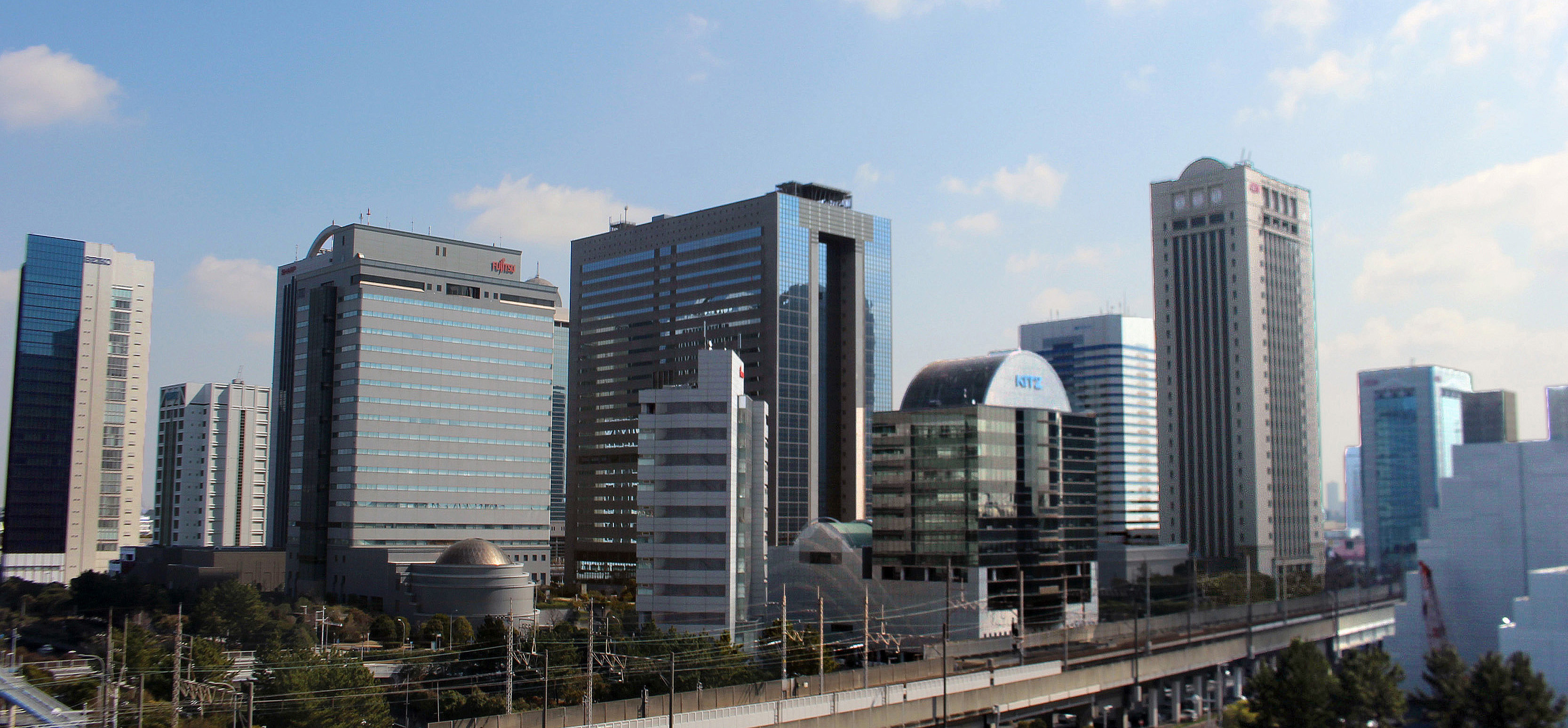
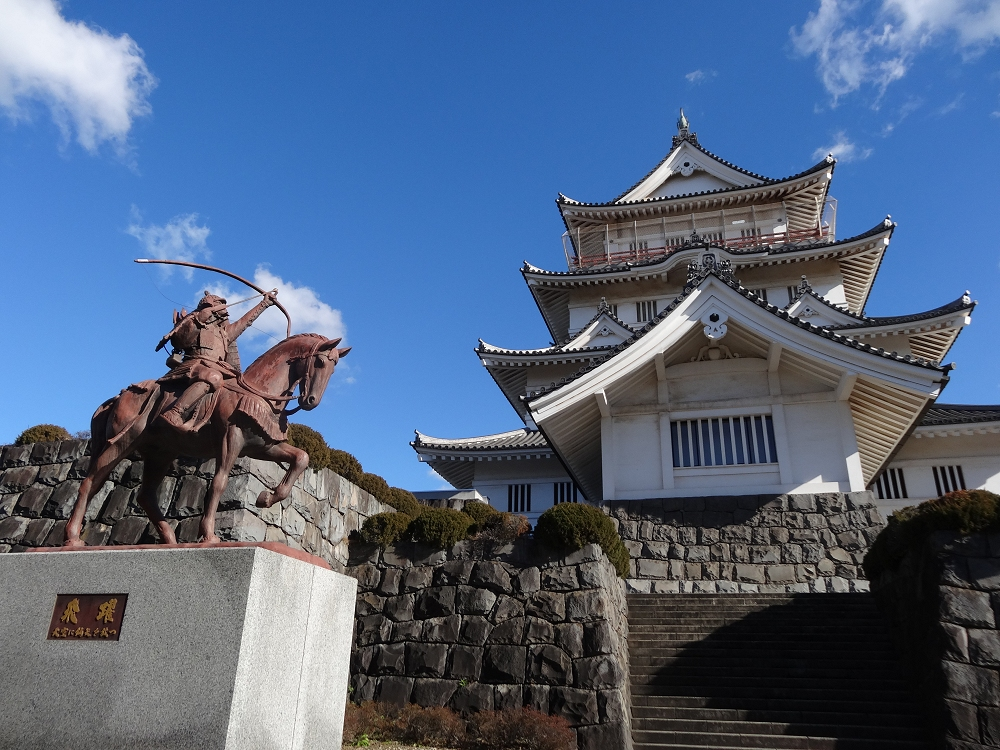
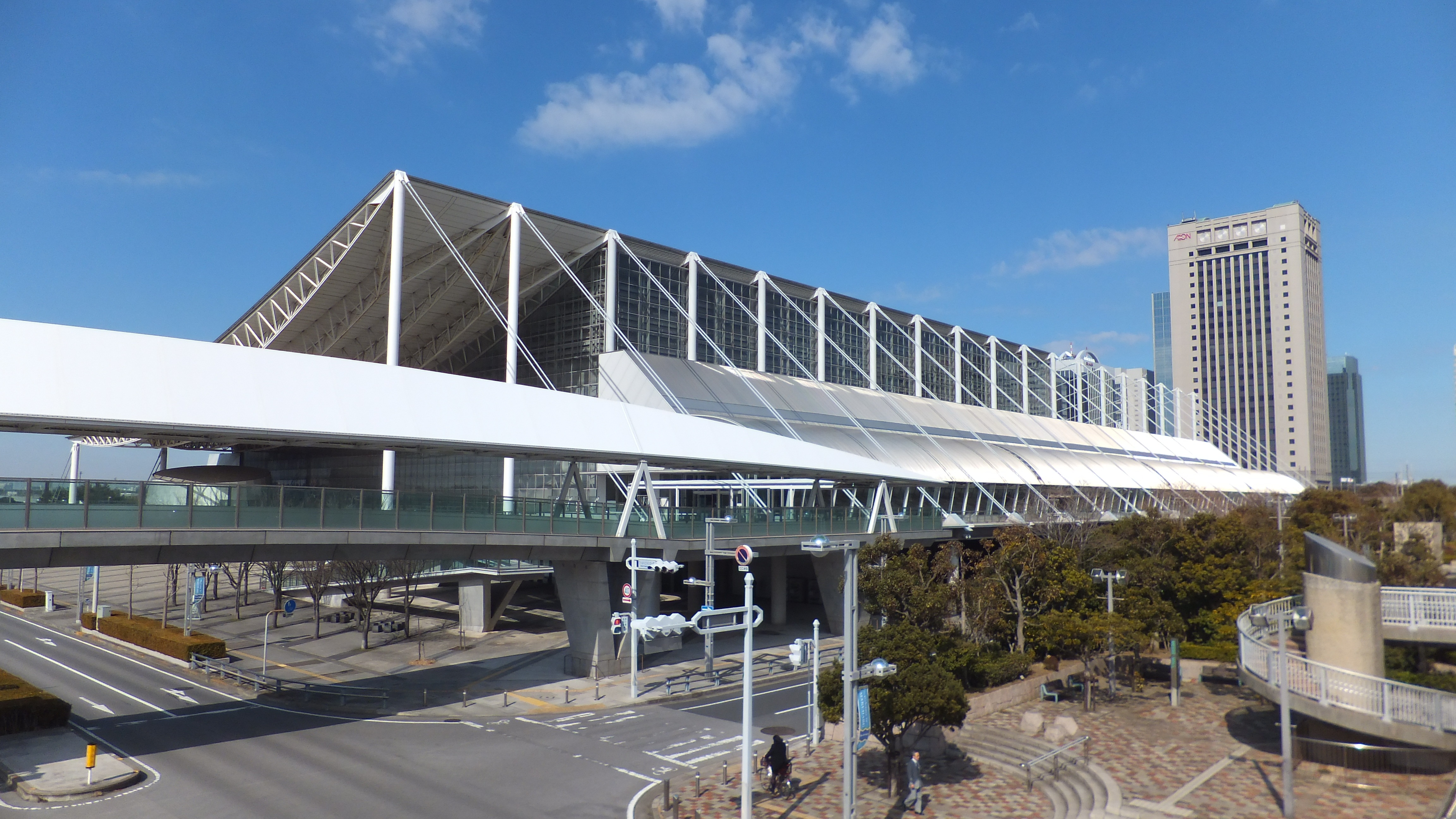
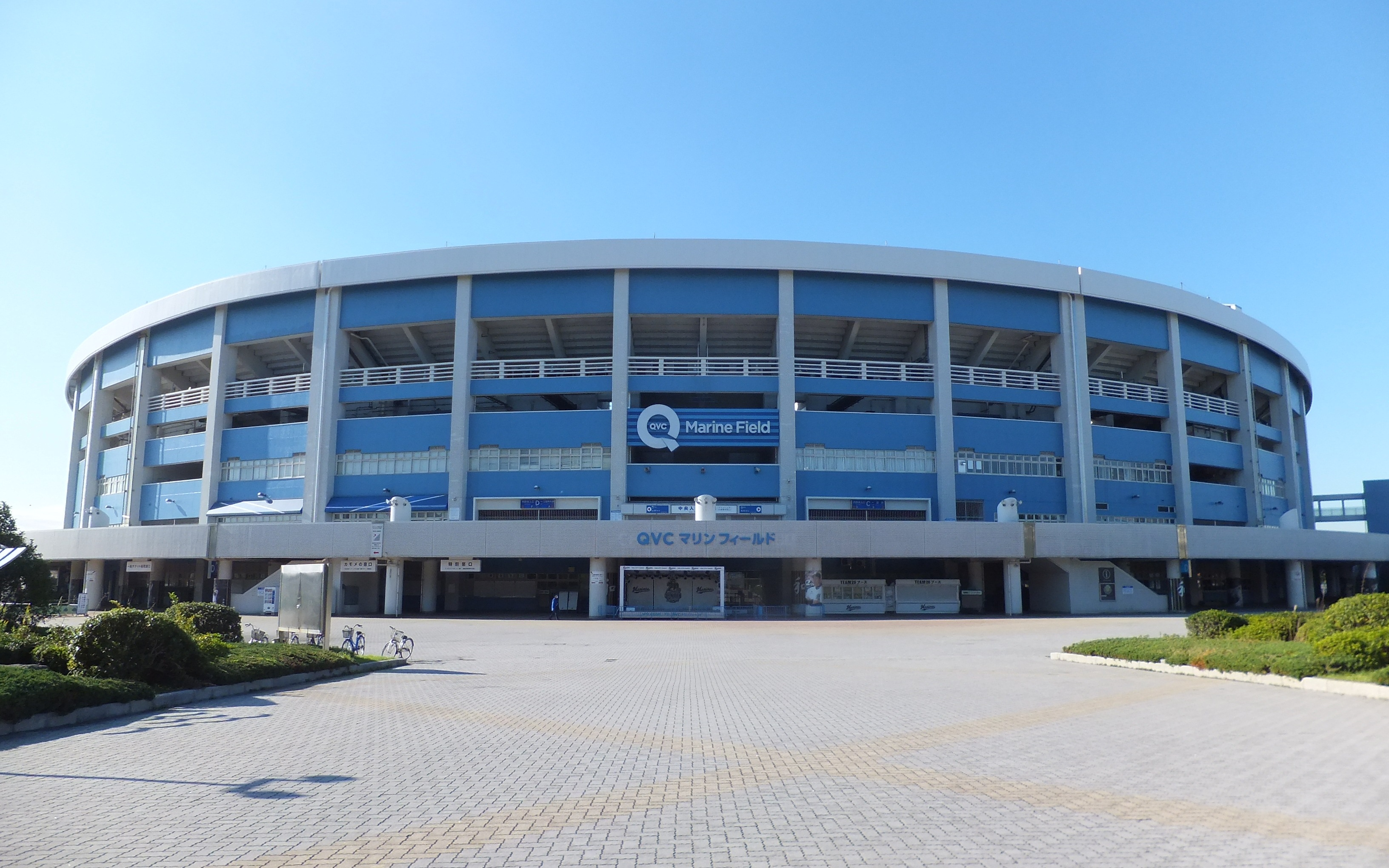
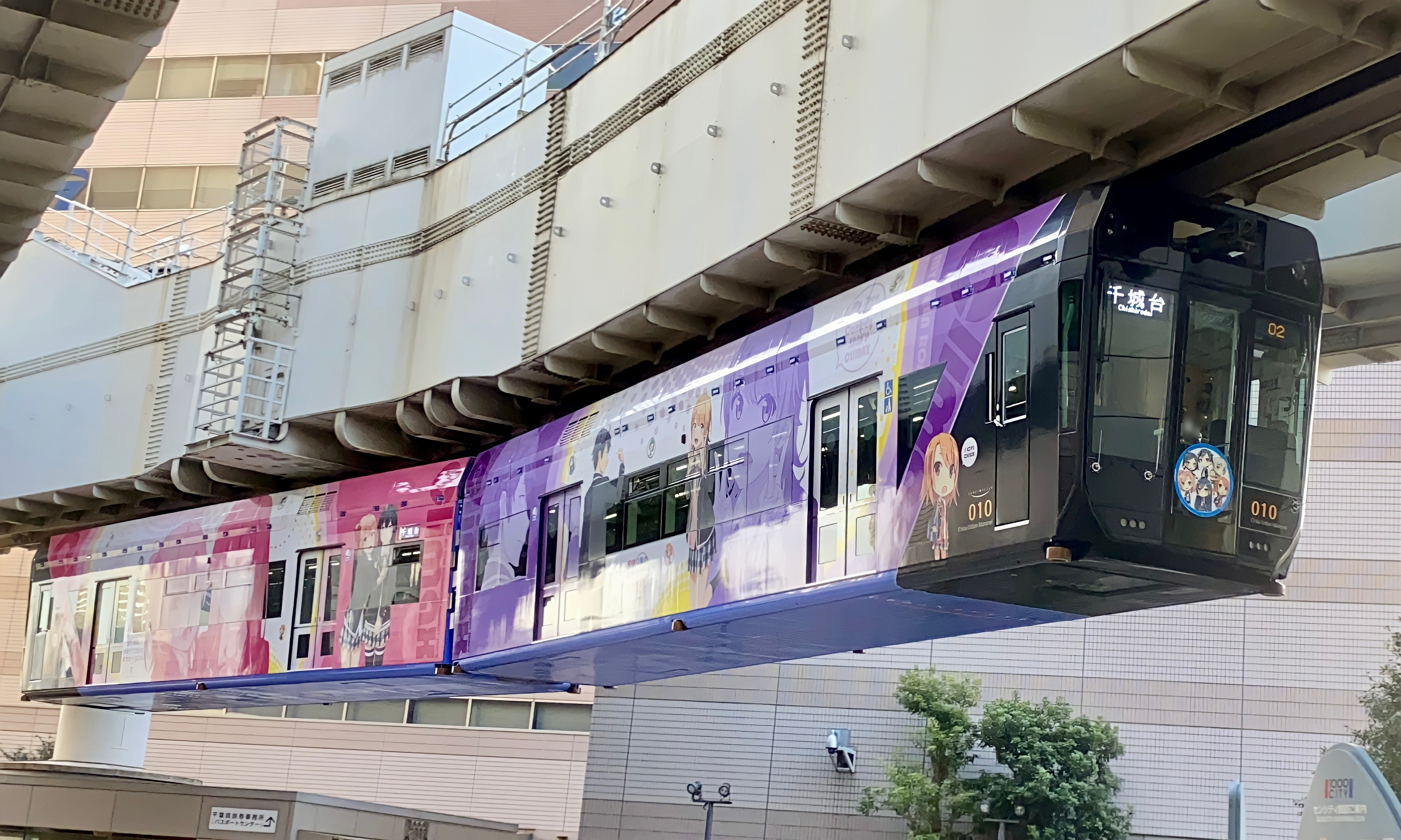
- Skyscrapers of Makuhari Chiba City Folk Museum Makuhari Messe Chiba Marine Stadium Chiba Port Tower Chiba Urban Monorail

- Flag Seal
- Interactive map of Chiba
- Coordinates: 35°36′26.2″N 140°06′22.9″E
- Country: Japan
- Region: Kantō
- Prefecture: Chiba Prefecture

Government
  - Mayor: Shunichi Kamiya (from April 2021)

Area
  - Total: 271.77 km^{2} (104.93 sq mi)

Population (December 18th 2024)
  - Total: 985,059
  - Density: 3,624.6/km^{2} (9,387.7/sq mi)
- Time zone: UTC+9 (Japan Standard Time)
- Tree: Zelkova serrata
  - Flower: Nelumbo nucifera
  - Bird: Little tern
- Phone number: 043-245-5111
- Address: 1–1 Chiba-minato, Chūō-ku, Chiba-shi 260-8722
- Website: https://www.city.chiba.jp/

Chiba
- "Chiba" in kanji

Japanese name
- Kanji: 千葉
- Hiragana: ちば
- Katakana: チバ
Transcriptions
- Romanization: Chiba

Chiba (千葉市, Chiba-shi; Japanese pronunciation: [c̟͡ɕí.bä̀, c̟͡ɕì.bä́(.ɕì)]) is the capital city of Chiba Prefecture, Japan. It sits about 40 kilometres (25 mi) east of the centre of Tokyo on Tokyo Bay. The city became a government-designated city in 1992. In March 2025, its population was 983,045, with a population density of 3,617 people per km^{2}. The city has an area of 271.77 square kilometres (104.93 sq mi).

Chiba City is one of the Kantō region's primary seaports, and is home to Chiba Port, which handles one of the highest volumes of cargo in Japan. Much of the city is residential, although there are many factories and warehouses along the coast. There are several major urban centres in the city, including Makuhari, a prime waterfront business district in which Makuhari Messe is located, and Central Chiba, in which the prefectural government office and the city hall are located.

Chiba is famous for the Chiba Urban Monorail, the longest suspended monorail in the world. Some popular destinations in the city include: Kasori Shell Midden, the largest shell mound in the world at 134,000 m^{2} (160,000 sq yd), Inage Beach, the first artificial beach in Japan which forms part of the longest artificial beach in Japan, and the Chiba Zoological Park, popular on account of the standing red panda Futa.

== Etymology ==
The name of Chiba in the Japanese language is formed from two kanji characters. The first, 千, means "thousand" and the second, 葉 means "leaves". The name first appears as an ancient kuni no miyatsuko, or regional command office, as Chiha no Kuni no Miyatsuko (千葉国造). The name was adopted by a branch of the Taira clan, which moved to the area in present-day Chiba City in the late Heian period. The branch of the Taira adopted the name and became the Chiba clan, which held strong influence over the area of the prefecture until the Azuchi–Momoyama period. The name "Chiba" was chosen for Chiba Prefecture at the time of its creation in 1873 by the Assembly of Prefectural Governors (地方官会議, Chihō Kankai Kaigi), an early Meiji-period body of prefectural governors that met to decide the structure of local and regional administration in Japan.

== History ==
=== Early history ===
The first records related to the city of Chiba record the emigration of Taira Tsuneshige (1083?–1088), a powerful bushi warlord of the late Heian period, to Shimōsa Province, which historically occupied the north of Chiba Prefecture. Tsuneshige was appointed as gunji administrator of Sōma District, but was transferred to the same position in Chiba District two years later. Here he proclaimed himself Chiba Tsuneshige (千葉常重), became a kokushi governor of the province, and used the area around present-day Chiba City as a power base to rule over Shimōsa Province, Kazusa Province, as well as establish himself as a military force in the Kantō region. Tsuneshige's son, Chiba Tsunetane (千葉常胤) (1118–1201) was instrumental in aiding Minamoto no Yoritomo (1147–1199) with the establishment of the Kamakura shogunate. Tsuneshige built a spacious residence and numerous temples in present-day Chiba City, and in the same period he transferred his power base from Ōji Castle to a mansion in present-day Chiba City. The area of present-day Chiba City became jōkamachi (城下町), or castle town, and prospered under the Chiba clan. The clan's power extended in the region until the Muromachi period.

=== Medieval period ===
The Chiba clan's power and influence declined because of wars around the Kantō region during the Nanboku-chō and Muromachi periods. In the 16th century, the Hara clan, which were vassals of Chiba clan, took control of the region from the Chiba clan and built Inohana Castle. In the Sengoku period, the Hara clan was forcibly removed by Ashikaga Yoshiaki (足利義明, not to be confused with 足利義昭). Then, Ashikaga Yoshiaki was also removed by the Sakai (酒井, not to be confused with the Sakai clan in Mikawa) clan, which was one of the servants of the Satomi (里見) clan. Finally both the Chiba and Sakai clans were annihilated by Toyotomi Hideyoshi.

=== Later history ===
In the Edo period, the Oyumi (生実氏), Morikawa (森川氏) clan, and the Sakura (佐倉氏) clans governed the area now occupied by the city. A part of the area was also governed directly by the Tokugawa Bakufu. The Oyumi clan governed their territory stably. On the other hand, according to the Sakura clan, from the beginning of the Edo period, changed governors frequently, including Takeda Nobuyoshi, Matsudaira Tadateru, Ogasawara Yoshitsugu (小笠原吉次), and Doi Toshikatsu. Finally the Hotta clan stabilized the governance of their territory. Chiba prospered in this period as a shukuba (宿場) post-town of the Tokugawa shogunate.

=== Modern history ===
After the Meiji Restoration in 1868, Chiba Prefecture was established in 1873 with the merger of Kisarazu Prefecture and Inba Prefecture. The border between Kisarazu and Inba was the location of Chiba Town and was thus chosen as the location of the prefectural government. With the opening of the Sōbu Main Line, Chiba developed rapidly, becoming the political, economic, and cultural capital of Chiba Prefecture. The town of Chiba was established within Chiba District with the creation of the municipalities system on April 1, 1889. Chiba City formed on January 1, 1921. Numerous small villages and towns were merged into the previous town of Chiba (千葉町), a process that continued until 1944. Large-scale land reclamation added to the area of the city throughout the 20th century. The city was a major center of military production leading up to the Pacific War, and the aerial bombing of Chiba in 1945. The city was almost completely destroyed by the end of the war. Post-war industrialization led to the city becoming a major part of the Keiyō Industrial Zone. Chiba became a Designated City of Japan on April 1, 1992.

== Demographics ==
Per Japanese census data, Chiba's population has expanded significantly over the past 70 years.

As of March 2025, the total population is 983,045 people, with 39,537 registered foreign residents. It is the 15th most populous city in Japan as of 2024.

Historical population
Year	Pop.	±%
1921 (founding)	33,887	—
1930	49,088	+44.9%
1940	92,061	+87.5%
1950	133,944	+45.5%
1960	241,615	+80.4%
1970	482,133	+99.5%
1980	746,430	+54.8%
1990	829,455	+11.1%
2000	887,164	+7.0%
2010	961,749	+8.4%
2020	974,951	+1.4%

== Politics and government ==
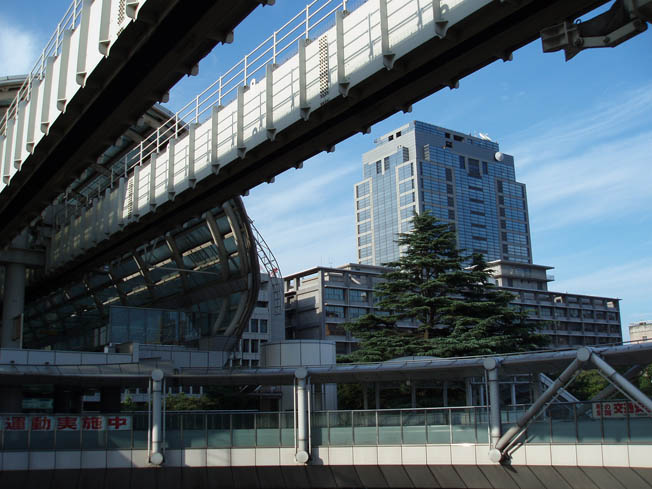
Building of Chiba Prefectural government and Chiba Urban Monorail

Chiba was governed by Keiichi Tsuruoka, an independent (elected with support of LDP and Kōmeitō), until May 1, 2009. He was arrested in April 2009 during a corruption investigation by the Tokyo Metropolitan Police. He was succeeded by Toshihito Kumagai of the DPJ, who won election in June 2009. The current Mayor is Shunichi Kamiya, who was first elected in 2021. Mayor Kamiya was subsequently re-elected as mayor for a second term on March 16, 2025.

The city assembly has 54 elected members.

=== Wards ===
Chiba has six wards (ku):

- Chūō-ku – administrative center
- Hanamigawa-ku
- Inage-ku
- Midori-ku
- Mihama-ku
- Wakaba-ku

== Climate ==
Chiba has a humid subtropical climate (Köppen climate classification Cfa) with hot summers and cool to mild winters. Precipitation is significant throughout the year, but is somewhat lower in winter.

Climate data for Chiba (1991−2020 normals, extremes 1966−present)
Month	Jan	Feb	Mar	Apr	May	Jun	Jul	Aug	Sep	Oct	Nov	Dec	Year
Record high °C (°F)	20.7 (69.3)	24.7 (76.5)	25.9 (78.6)	28.7 (83.7)	32.2 (90.0)	36.4 (97.5)	37.8 (100.0)	38.5 (101.3)	36.2 (97.2)	32.8 (91.0)	27.5 (81.5)	24.3 (75.7)	38.5 (101.3)
Mean maximum °C (°F)	15.4 (59.7)	18.2 (64.8)	20.8 (69.4)	25.0 (77.0)	28.5 (83.3)	31.2 (88.2)	34.6 (94.3)	35.5 (95.9)	32.7 (90.9)	28.2 (82.8)	23.0 (73.4)	19.0 (66.2)	36.0 (96.8)
Mean daily maximum °C (°F)	10.1 (50.2)	10.7 (51.3)	13.8 (56.8)	18.7 (65.7)	23.0 (73.4)	25.6 (78.1)	29.4 (84.9)	31.0 (87.8)	27.5 (81.5)	22.3 (72.1)	17.3 (63.1)	12.5 (54.5)	20.2 (68.4)
Daily mean °C (°F)	6.1 (43.0)	6.6 (43.9)	9.6 (49.3)	14.5 (58.1)	18.9 (66.0)	21.9 (71.4)	25.7 (78.3)	27.1 (80.8)	23.8 (74.8)	18.6 (65.5)	13.4 (56.1)	8.6 (47.5)	16.2 (61.2)
Mean daily minimum °C (°F)	2.4 (36.3)	2.8 (37.0)	5.7 (42.3)	10.6 (51.1)	15.4 (59.7)	19.0 (66.2)	23.0 (73.4)	24.3 (75.7)	21.0 (69.8)	15.6 (60.1)	9.9 (49.8)	4.9 (40.8)	12.9 (55.2)
Mean minimum °C (°F)	−0.9 (30.4)	−0.8 (30.6)	1.3 (34.3)	4.3 (39.7)	10.3 (50.5)	14.7 (58.5)	18.6 (65.5)	20.2 (68.4)	15.8 (60.4)	10.4 (50.7)	4.7 (40.5)	1.0 (33.8)	−1.3 (29.7)
Record low °C (°F)	−5.1 (22.8)	−5.2 (22.6)	−4.4 (24.1)	0.4 (32.7)	6.8 (44.2)	9.1 (48.4)	12.5 (54.5)	16.5 (61.7)	10.7 (51.3)	5.8 (42.4)	−0.9 (30.4)	−3.7 (25.3)	−5.2 (22.6)
Average precipitation mm (inches)	67.5 (2.66)	59.1 (2.33)	111.3 (4.38)	110.4 (4.35)	122.3 (4.81)	150.9 (5.94)	136.5 (5.37)	115.7 (4.56)	204.7 (8.06)	225.7 (8.89)	94.1 (3.70)	56.8 (2.24)	1,454.7 (57.27)
Average snowfall cm (inches)	2 (0.8)	4 (1.6)	0 (0)	0 (0)	0 (0)	0 (0)	0 (0)	0 (0)	0 (0)	0 (0)	0 (0)	0 (0)	7 (2.8)
Average precipitation days (≥ 0.5 mm)	6.2	6.8	11.2	10.7	11.2	12.4	10.7	8.5	12.0	11.5	8.8	6.5	116.6
Average relative humidity (%)	53	55	61	66	71	77	78	77	77	73	66	57	68
Mean monthly sunshine hours	191.6	165.3	167.5	177.0	180.5	126.9	162.7	189.4	134.6	131.6	143.6	174.8	1,945.5
Source: Japan Meteorological Agency

== Culture ==
One of the many points of interest is the Experimental Station for Landscape Plants.

=== Facilities ===
- Chiba Zoo
- Makuhari Messe

=== Park ===
- Chiba Park
- Aoba no Mori Park
- Showa no Mori Park

== Transportation ==
=== Airports ===
There is no commercial airport within city limits. Narita International Airport and Tokyo International Airport (Haneda) are the closest major airports.

=== Railway ===
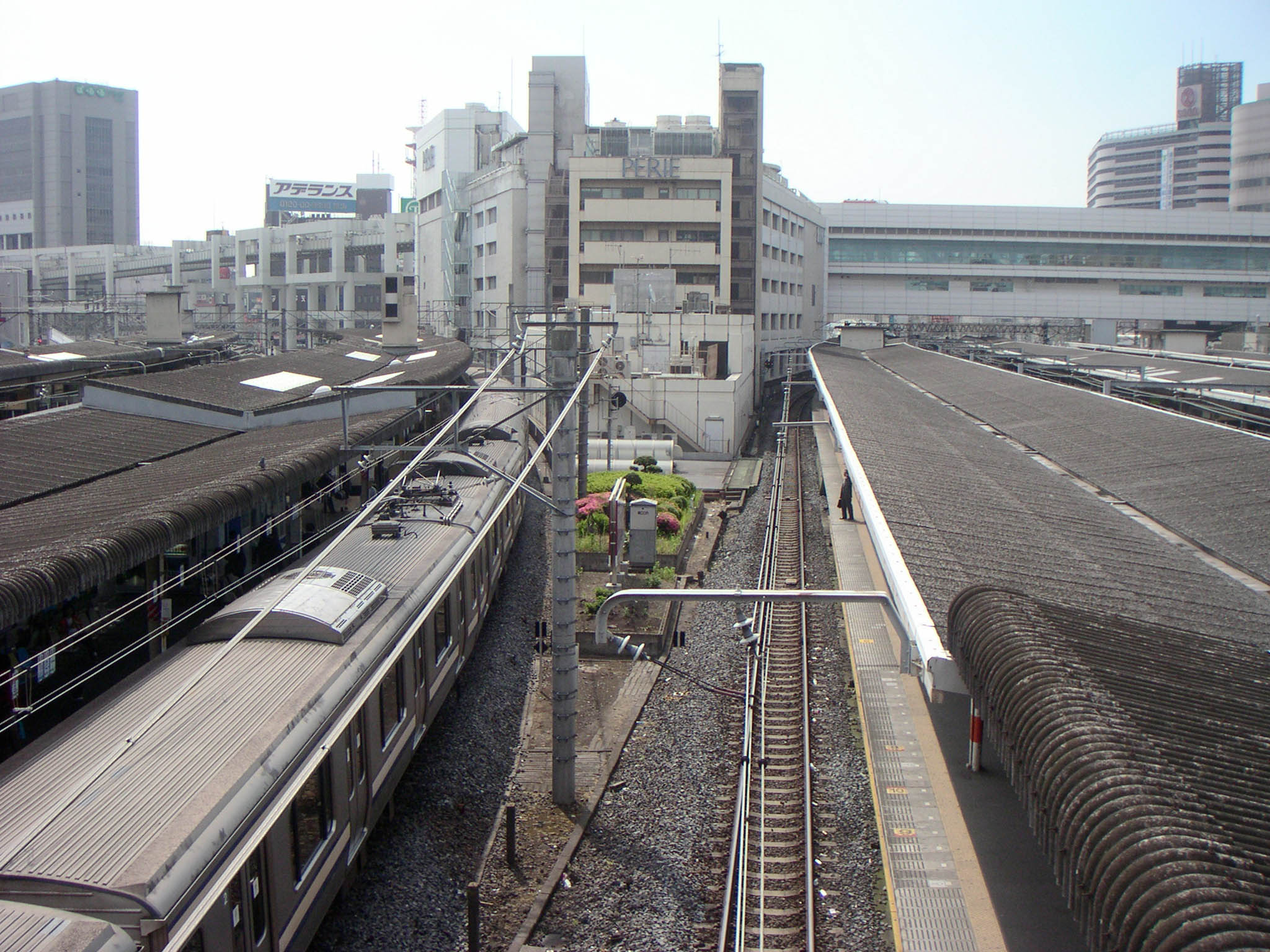
Chiba Station

The Chiba Urban Monorail runs through Chiba City. The major intercity railway stations are Chiba Station, (Sobu Line, Sotobō Line, Uchibo Line, Sōbu Main Line, Narita Line, transfer for Chiba Urban Monorail), Keisei Chiba Station (Keisei Chiba Line), and Soga Station, (Keiyō Line, Sotobō Line, Uchibo Line) all in Chūō-ku.

=== Highway ===
- Higashi-Kantō Expressway to Tokyo, Narita and Kashima
- Tateyama Expressway to Kisarazu
- Keiyō Road
- Chiba-Tōgane Road (Japan National Route 126
- Japan National Route 14
- Japan National Route 16
- Japan National Route 51
- Japan National Route 128
- Japan National Route 357

=== Sports ===
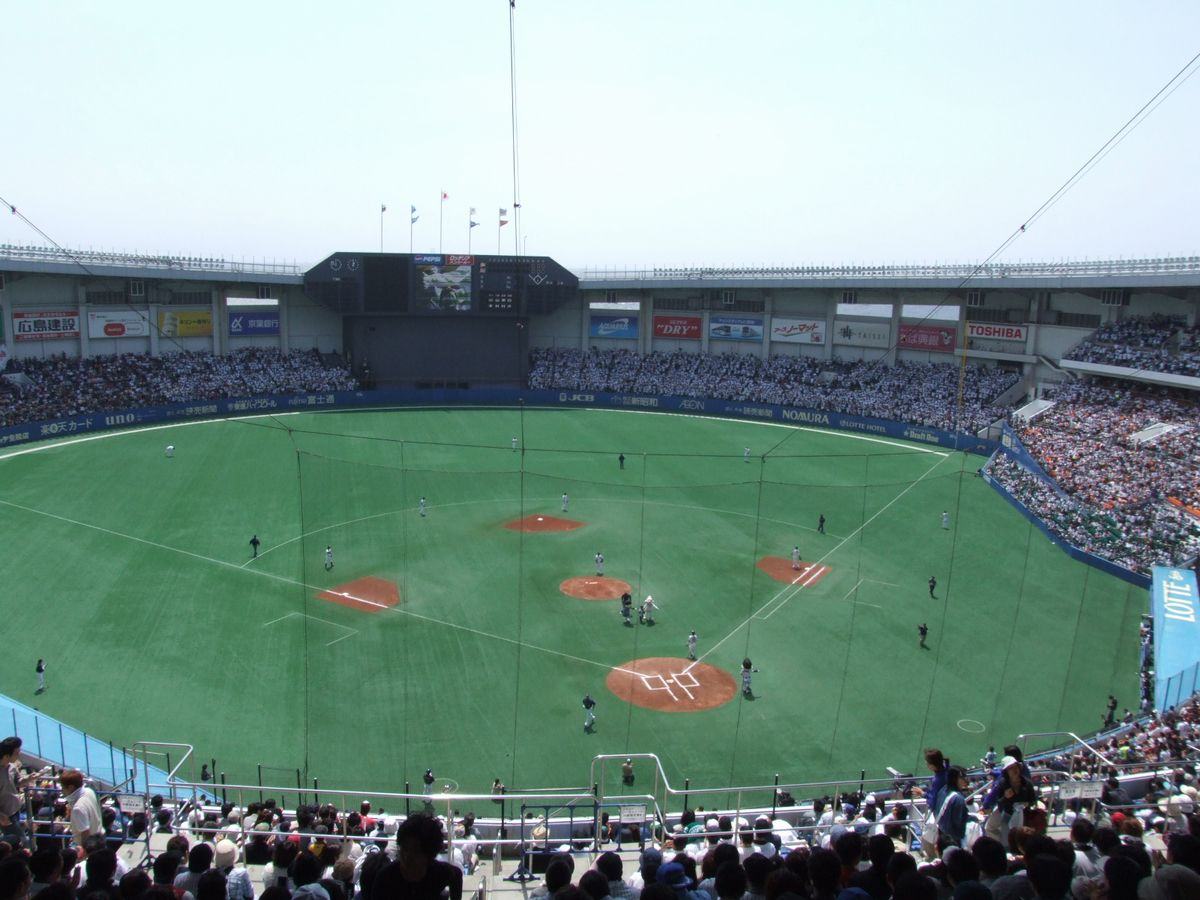
Home stadium of the Chiba Marines

Chiba plays host to the annual International Chiba Ekiden and the Chiba International Cross Country takes place just outside the city. Chiba Velodrome is located within the city. It also hosts the Bridgestone Open golf tournament.

Chiba is home to several professional sports teams, most notably:

Club	Sport	League	Venue	Established
Chiba Lotte Marines	Baseball	Pacific League	Chiba Marine Stadium	1950
JEF United Ichihara Chiba	Football	J. League Division 2	Fukuda Denshi Arena	1946
Altiri Chiba	Basketball	B2 League	[Chiba Port Arena]	2020

== Education ==
=== Colleges and universities ===
- Chiba Keizai University
- Chiba Meitoku College
- Chiba Prefectural University of Health Sciences
- Chiba University
- Japan Christian Junior College
- Kanda University of International Studies
- Keiai University
- The Open University of Japan
- Shukutoku University
- Teikyo Heisei University (Chiba campus)
- Tokyo Christian University
- Tokyo Dental College
- Tokyo University of Information Sciences
- Uekusa University

=== High schools ===
Chiba has 20 public high schools operated by the Chiba Prefectural Board of Education and two public high schools operated by the Chiba City Board of Education, including Inage Senior High School. There are also nine private high schools, including the Makuhari Junior and Senior High School.

=== Elementary and middle schools ===
Chiba has 114 public and one private elementary school and 59 public and one private middle school.

=== International schools ===
- Chiba Korean Primary and Junior High School
- Inage International Combined Junior and Senior High School

== Hospitals and clinics ==
- Chiba Kaihin Hospital (Mihama-ku)
- Chiba University Hospital (Chuo-ku)
- Hirayama Hospital (Hanamigawa-ku)
- Kashiwado Hospital (Chuo-ku)
- Koizumi Clinic (Hanamigawa-ku)
- Mizuno Clinic (Hanamigawa-ku)
- Tokyo Dental College Chiba Hospital (Mihama-ku)

== International relations ==
=== Sister cities ===
Chiba City is twinned with:

- North Vancouver, Canada, since 1970
- Asunción, Paraguay, since 1970
- Houston, United States, since 1972
- Quezon City, Philippines, since 1972
- Tianjin, China, since 1986
- Montreux, Switzerland, since 1996
- Wujiang (Suzhou), China, since 1996

== Notable people ==
- Sawa Ishige, born in Shizuoka but moved to Chiba
- Hiroshi Miyauchi, actor
- Ryuta Kawashima, born in Chiba in 1959
- Masaki Aiba, of Arashi (born in Chiba in 1982)
- Pata, of X Japan and Ra:IN
- Yukihiro of L'Arc-en-Ciel, from Chiba and a graduate of The Chiba University of Commerce
- Tomohisa Yamashita, of NEWS (Originally from Funabashi, Chiba)
- Naohito Fujiki, Japan Academy Prize-winning actor (Originally from Kurashiki, Okayama)
- Natsuki Mizu, top star of Snow Troupe in the Takarazuka Revue (born in Chiba in 1972)
- Daiki Arioka, of Hey! Say! JUMP
- Shiho Fujita, better known as Sifow
- Mirei Kiritani, actress, model, news anchor
- Kentaro Miura, creator of Berserk (born in Chiba in 1966)
- Tsukasa Fushimi, creator of Oreimo (born in Chiba in 1981)
- Susumu Tadakuma, prominent electrical engineer and professor (retired) at Chiba Institute of Technology
- Tao Okamoto, model (Originally from Ichikawa, Chiba)
- Rena Kato, formerly of AKB48
- Reina Fujie, formerly of NMB48
- Rina Hidaka, voice actress and former child actress
- Cho Chikun, Go-player and Honorable citizen of Chiba City (1996).
- Shiina Natsukawa, pop idol and member of girl group TrySail
- Mitsuhiro Hidaka, rapper and member of co-ed group AAA
- Kenta Yamashita, racing driver
- Seiji Ara, racing driver
- Daiki Hashimoto, men's artistic gymnast, all-around champion at the 2020 Summer Olympics (born in Narita, but resides in Chiba)
- Wataru Watari, creator of My Youth Romantic Comedy Is Wrong, As I Expected (born and currently resides in Chiba)
- Shinichi Yamaji, racing driver
- Hideki Konno, video game director, game designer and producer
- Shiro Ishii, head of unit 731
- Kaho Minagawa, rhythmic gymnast, hoop bronze medallist at the 2017 Rhythmic Gymnastics World Championships
- Kabosu, the Shiba Inu featured in the Doge meme
