= CKU (disambiguation) =

CKU may refer to:

- Chiba Keizai University, a private university in Inage-ku, Chiba, Japan
- Cordova Municipal Airport, the IATA and FAA LID code CKU
- ISO 639:cku, the ISO 639 code for the Koasati language
