= Keizai =

Keizai is the Japanese word for economics. It may refer to:

- Chiba Keizai University
- The Nihon Keizai Shimbun, former name of The Nikkei, the world's largest financial newspaper
- Ryutsu Keizai University, in Ibaraki
  - Ryutsu Keizai University FC, a football (soccer) club
- Sangyō Keizai Shimbun, or Sankei Shimbun, a daily newspaper in Japan
- Toyo Keizai, a Japanese book and magazine publisher
