= Inohana Castle =

Ruined Japanese castle

- 亥鼻城
- Chiba, Chiba Prefecture, Japan
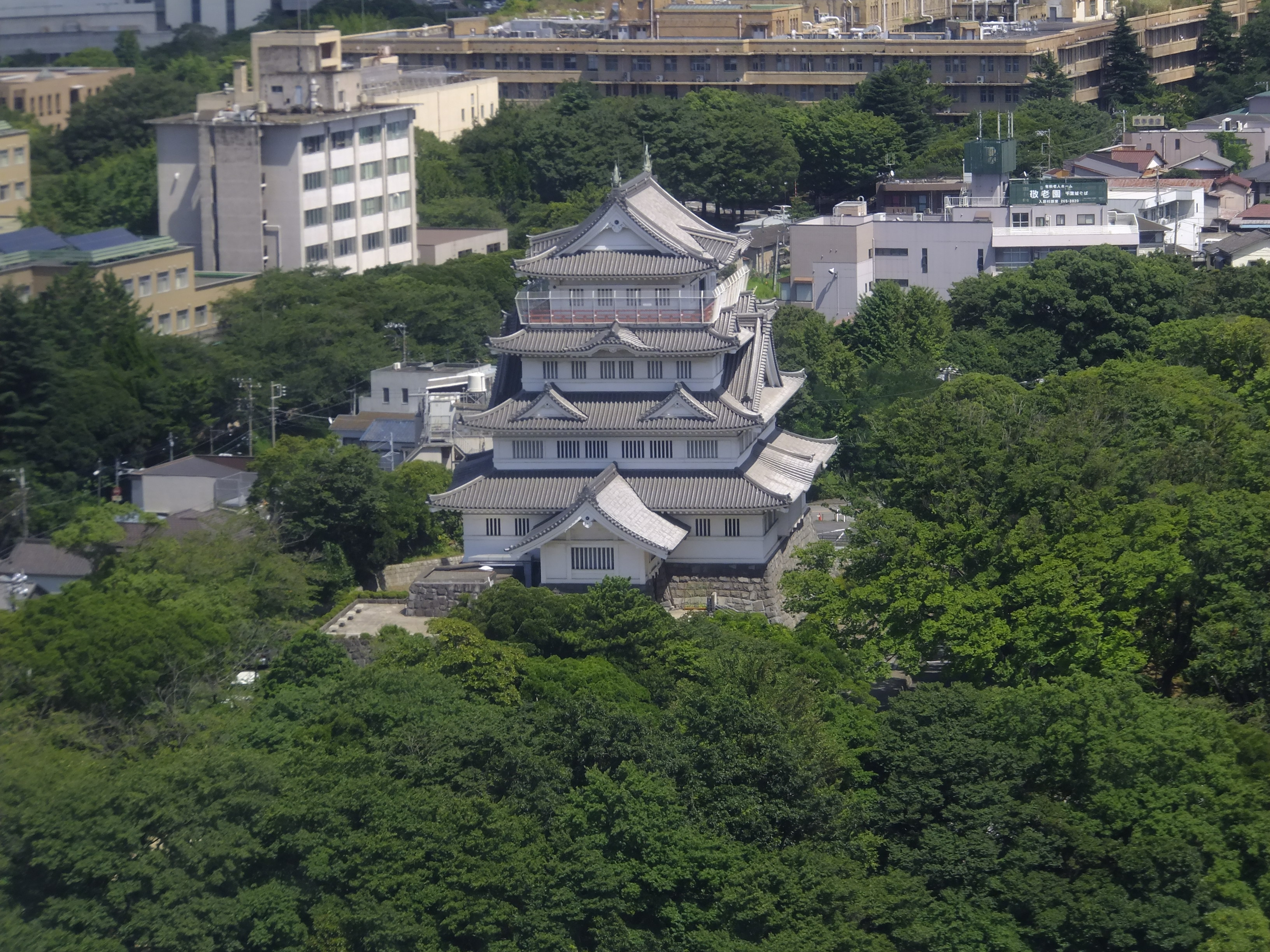
- Chiba City Folk Museum on the grounds of Inohana Castle ruins

Site information
- Type: hirayama-style Japanese castle
- Open to the public: yes
- Condition: Only earthworks and moats remain

Location
- Coordinates: 35°36′18″N 140°07′34″E

Site history
- Built: Late Muromachi period
- Built by: Either the Chiba clan or Hara clan
- In use: Until 1516

Inohana Castle (亥鼻城, Inohana-jō) was a Japanese hirayama-style (lowland hill) castle located in Inohana (formerly Shimōsa Province) in the Chuo district of Chiba City, Chiba Prefecture. It is commonly known as Chiba Castle. The surrounding area of the castle ruins have been developed into Inohana Park. The castle ruins, including its earthworks and moats, have been designated as a cultural property of the city. The Chiba City Folk Museum, a Japanese castle replica, was built on the site in 1967.

== History ==
Inohana castle was a hirayama-style castle built on a flatland hill south of Miyako River.

Although Inohana castle is commonly thought to have been the location of the Chiba clan's mansion, no traces of a Kamakura period mansion have been found in excavations so far. The mansion is instead thought to have been located in an area near Inohana hill, around the present-day Chiba District Court. However, the true location of the Chiba clan mansion is still unknown. The finding of urns with cremated 13th century remains indicates that Inohana was used as a cemetery instead.

An analysis of the earthworks and moats have led to theories that it is in fact the remains of a castle from the Sengoku period. In the Muromachi period, conflict between the Ashikaga shogunate in Kyoto and Kantō kubō caused the Kanto region to be thrown into chaos. During this period the Hara clan, retainers of the Chiba clan, gained power. In 1455 the Hara clan assumed control of the region around Inohana after an attack on the Chiba clan. The latter would eventually move their base to Moto Sakura Castle. Inohana Castle was possibly built during the time of Hara Tanefusa's son Norikatsu. Norikatsu was attacked by the Mikami clan in 1516, the castle was then destroyed or abandoned.

It was only in the Edo period that the old hill castle of Inohana was mentioned as the castle of the Chiba clan. In 1858, the "Illustrated Guide to Famous Places of Narita", produced at the time of the construction of the new main hall of Narita-san temple, contains a section about Chiba Tsunetane. It includes a "Diagram of the Site of the Old Castle of the Chiba Clan", with Inohanayama in the center.

In 1926, a monument commemorating the 800th anniversary of the founding of Chiba-fu was erected at the site of Inohana Castle, referencing Chiba Tsuneshige's rule of the area in the late Heian period. In 1976, a monument commemorating the 850th anniversary of the founding of Chiba-fu was erected.

=== Castle remains ===
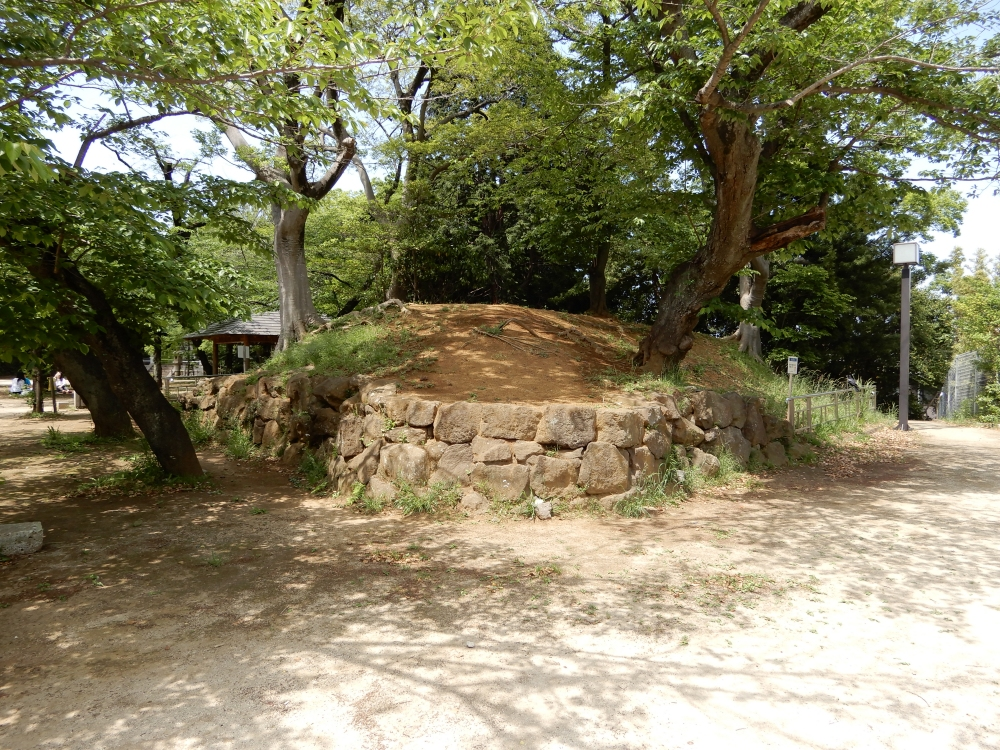
Surviving earthworks in Inohana Park

The name Inohana, literally pig's nose, is a reference to the shape of the hill where the castle was built on. North of the museum is a Shinmei Shrine and a monument to the ruins of Inohana Castle. The area around the shrine is said to be the site of an observation platform, which once offered a full view of the Tokyo Bay and the nearby Chiba Port. On the west side of the museum are remains of castle earthworks and dried moats that marked the inner citadel (kuwara) and center of the castle.

The ruins of Inohana Castle, has been designated as a cultural asset of the city.

There is a well called "Ochanomizu" on the north side of the castle ruins. There is a legend that Chiba Tsunetane made tea with water drawn from this well and presented it to Minamoto no Yoritomo. The stairs on the east side of the castle ruins were once called "Ikedazaka" and are said to have been the castle's back gate.

== Chiba City Folk Museum ==
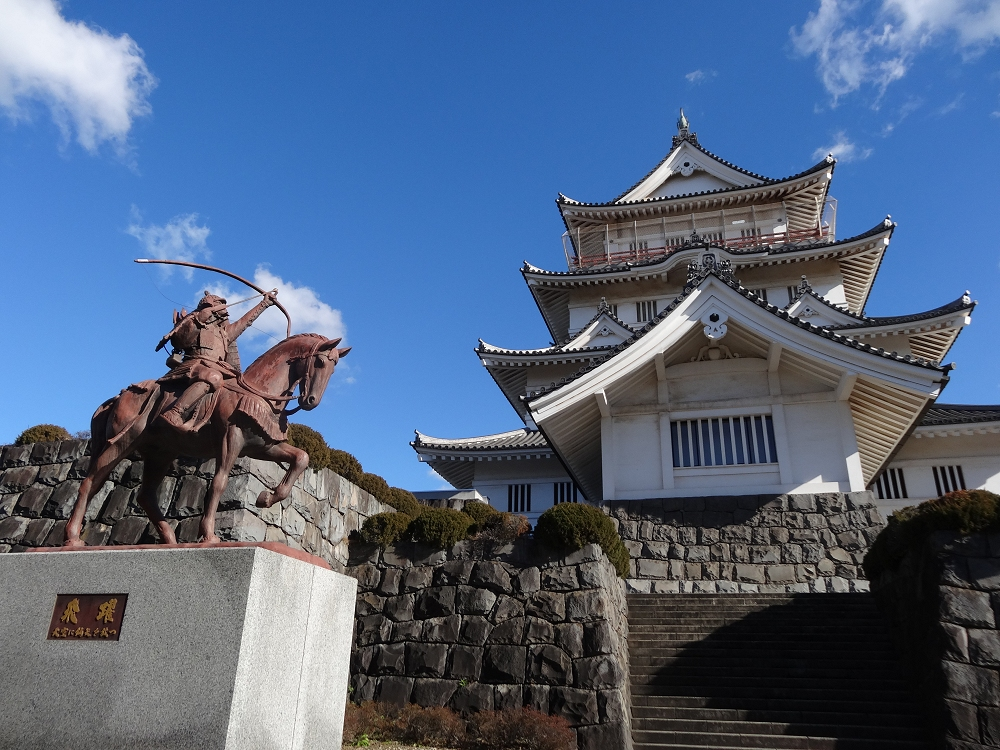
Chiba City Folk Museum main building and statue of Chiba Tsunetane

The Chiba City Folk Museum is a museum located in Inohana, Chuo Ward, Chiba City, Chiba Prefecture.

The museum main building is a Japanese castle tower replica (tenshu) built in the style of Azuchi-Momoyama period castles. In the front of the museum is a statue of Chiba Tsunetane, a samurai of the Chiba clan who helped Minamoto no Yoritomo establish the Kamakura shogunate.

In addition to the permanent exhibition on the local history of Chiba city and the Chiba clan, it also holds special exhibitions. First opened on April 9, 1967, the building is dedicated to research and studies on the history of Chiba city and the Chiba clan.
