= Futa (red panda) =

Japanese zoo animal (born 2003)

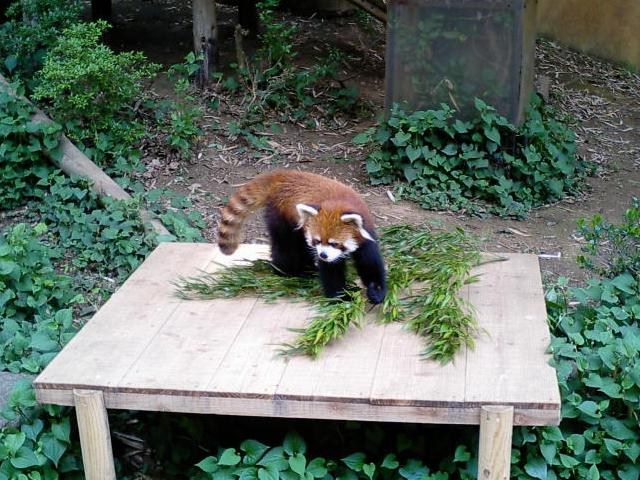
Futa in 2005

Futa (Japanese: 風太; born 2003 in Shizuoka) is a male red panda (Ailurus fulgens) at the Chiba Zoological Park in Chiba, Japan. In 2005, he became a visitor attraction and a television celebrity in Japan for his ability to stand upright on his hind feet for about ten seconds at a time.

At the time, this feat drew about 6,000 visitors to the zoo each weekend and resulted in Futa's appearance in a soft drink television advertisement. Futa was still alive in 2020, aged 17, equivalent to a human age of 70.

Futa inspired the character of Pabu, an animal companion in the animated U.S. TV series The Legend of Korra.

In recent years, Futa's right eye was affected by cataract.
