= Chiba Port Tower =

Tower in Chiba Prefecture, Japan

- 千葉ポートタワー; Chiba Pōto Tawā
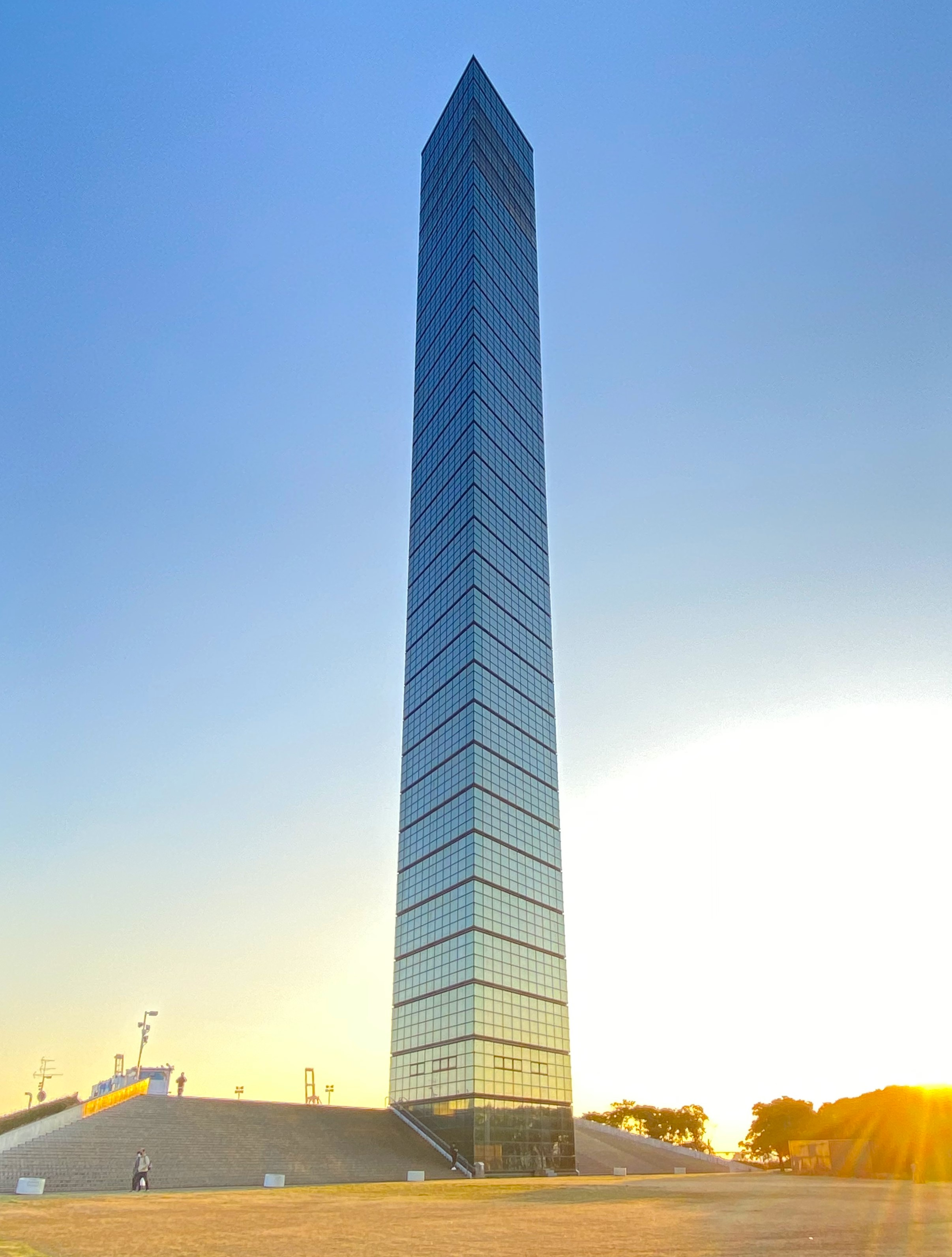
- Chiba Port Tower in 2023

- Location within Japan

General information
- Location: Chiba, Japan
- Coordinates: 35°36′1.52″N 140°5′52.54″E
- Construction started: March 1984
- Completed: March 25, 1986
- Opened: June 15, 1986
- Client: Chiba Prefecture
- Owner: City of Chiba, Chiba Prefecture

Height
- Height: 125.1 m (410 ft)

Technical details
- Floor count: 4
- Floor area: 2,307.54 m^{2} (24,838.2 sq ft)
- Lifts/elevators: 2

Design and construction
- Architecture firm: Takenaka Corporation

Chiba Port Tower is a tower located in Chiba Port Park, Chūō-ku, Chiba, Chiba Prefecture, Japan. It is 125.1 m (410 ft) tall and has four stories. It was built in 1986.

== Location ==
The closest station is Chiba-Minato Station on the Keiyō Line and Chiba Urban Monorail. It takes about 15 minutes on foot from the station to Chiba Port Tower. The tower is close to Chiba Central Post Office and Chiba Prefectural Museum of Art.

== History ==
The tower opened on June 15, 1986. It was built in commemoration of the population of Chiba Prefecture exceeding five million in 1983. This is because the expansion of the commuter belt to Tokyo and the development of the Keiyō Industrial Zone had caused rapid growth in Chiba Prefecture's population from 1970s to 1980s.

== Appearance ==
The tower cross-section is lozenge shaped. The size of lozenge is not so large because Chiba Prefecture wanted to emphasize the slimness of the tower. The width of a side of this lozenge is about 15 m (49 ft). On the outside, the tower is covered with mirrored glass which reflects the sun and makes the tower appear blue in fine weather.

== Floor guide ==
The tower has four stories. First, visitors go up to the fourth floor from the first floor by using the elevator. Then, they go down to the third floor and the second floor. Finally, visitors go down to the first floor from the second floor by using the elevator.

The first floor is the entrance. There is a shop that sells goods related to Chiba and an exhibition room that explains the role of Chiba Port. Also, there is a theater and a kid's room.

The second floor is the view room which is at a height of 105 m (344 ft). There is a wall mural painted with special luminous paint called “Aqua Fantasy”. After sunset, the painting is lit up by a black-light, and the mysterious underwater view looks three-dimensional.

The third floor is the view coffee shop “Café La Plage” which is at a height of 109 m (358 ft). There are 50 seats and visitors are able to eat and drink while enjoying the view. It may be rented for private events such as wedding and parties.

The fourth floor is the main observation floor which is at 113 m (371 ft). It is the best viewpoint of the tower. There is an open space between the first floor and the second floor. Therefore, visitors are able to see the scenery of the sea while taking the elevator.

At the top of the tower there is a system called dynamic damper. It weighs about 15 tons and moves in the opposite direction from that which the main body of the tower moves, so that it cancels-out the oscillations of the tower, protecting it in earthquakes and strong wind. The tower can withstand wind up to 60 m (200 ft) per second (134 mph (216 km/h)) and earthquakes up to 7 on the Japan Meteorological Agency seismic intensity scale.

== Scenery from the observation floor ==
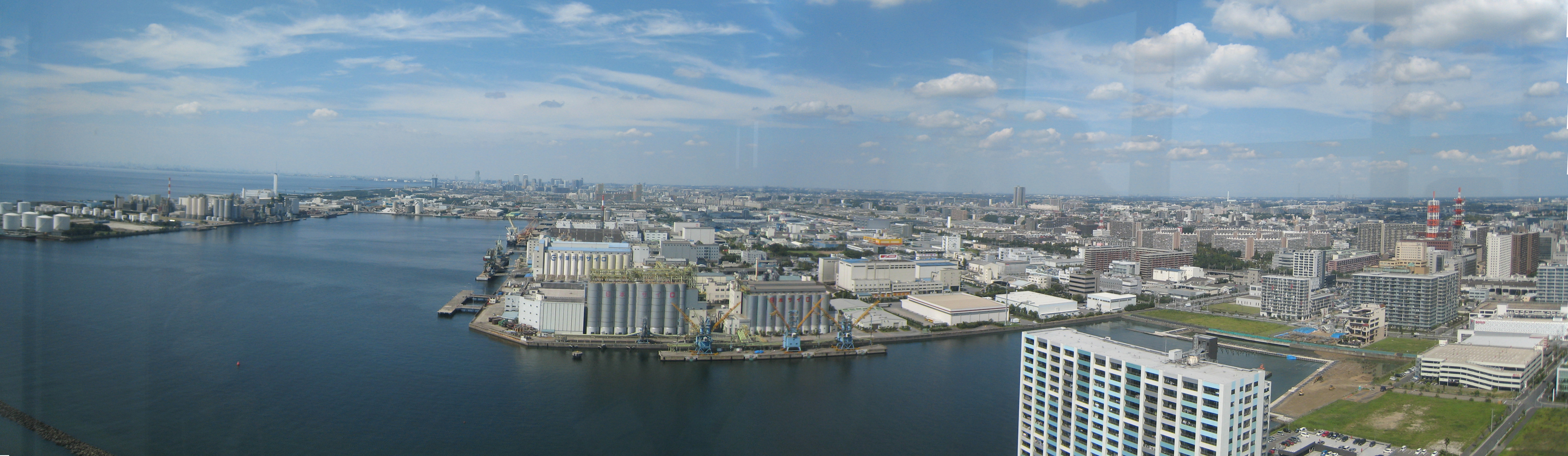
Panoramic view from the observation floor

The observation floor gives a 360-degree view of the surrounding area.

Makuhari New City, Chiba Marine Stadium, Makuhari Messe, Chiba Zoological Park, Sencity Tower, Chiba City Hall, and Mount Tsukuba can be seen to the North.

Narita Airport, Chiba Prefectural Museum of Art, Chiba Prefectural Office Building, and Chiba Port Square can be seen to the East.

Umihotaru, Haneda Airport, Rainbow Bridge, Tokyo Disney Resort, Tokyo Tower, and Yokohama Landmark Tower can be seen to the West. On clear days, Mount Fuji can also be seen.

Finally, JFE Steel Corporation's Eastern Japan Ironworks, Tokyo Electric Power Company, Incorporated's Chiba Thermal Power Station, and Tokyo Bay Aqua-Line can be seen to the South.

== Events ==
From the middle of November to the end of December, Chiba Port Tower is decorated with Christmas illuminations in the form of a large Christmas tree made of about 3,000 lights on the tower exterior.

Chiba Port Tower is also famous as one of the key spots in the course of International Chiba Ekiden. Runners make a turn in front of Chiba Port Tower.

Flea Market: "Chiba de Flea" is held every month at the plaza in front of Chiba Port Tower. Many customers and vendors from inside and outside Chiba Prefecture will participate. It is also an environmental activity that allows people to have fun while cooperating in an eco-friendly way.

(In 2022, the event will be held on the first and third Sundays of each month. However, it is closed in January, February, July and August.)
