= Keiyō Industrial Zone =

Industrial area in Chiba, Japan

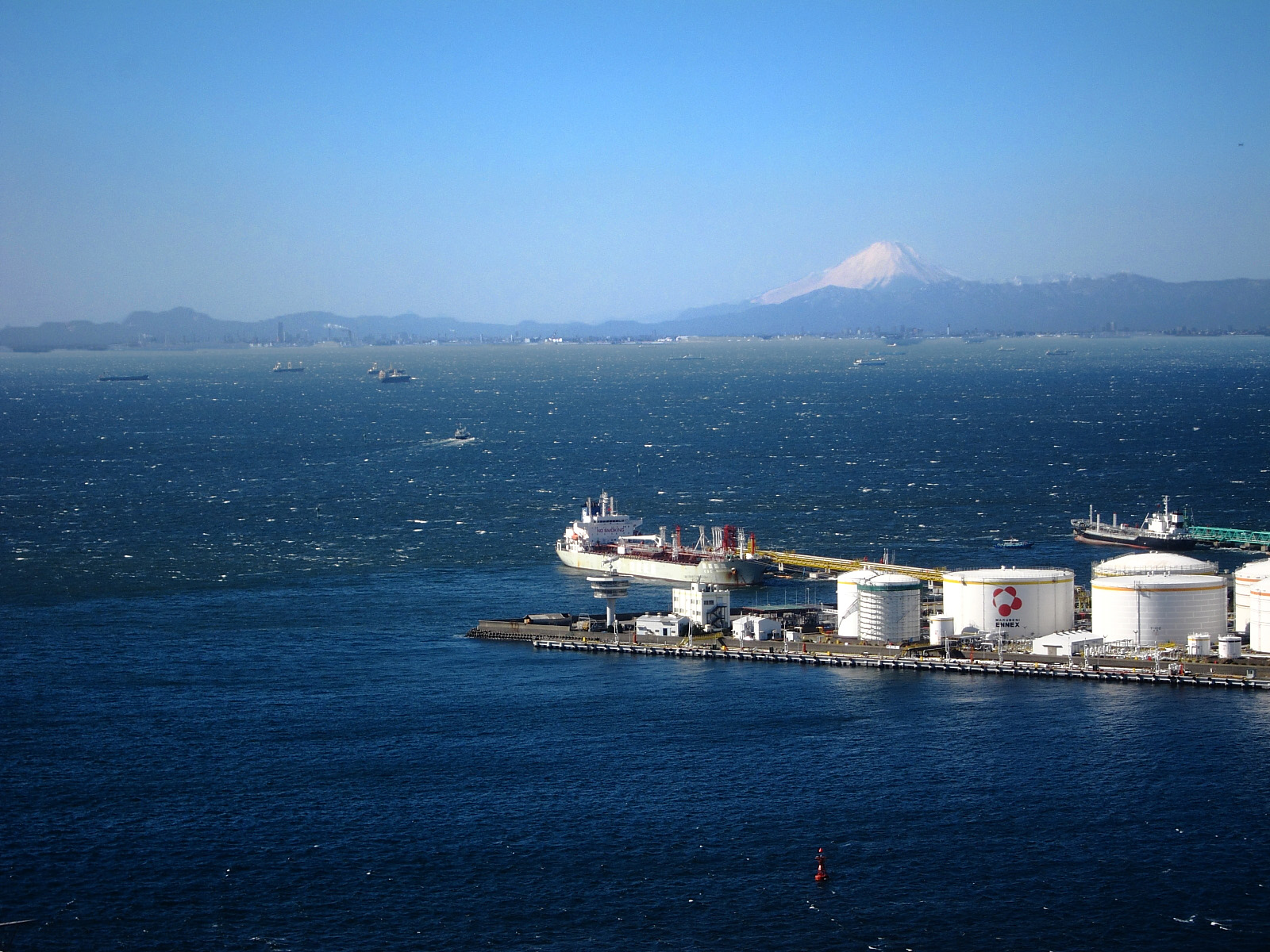
Port of Chiba with Mount Fuji in background

Keiyō Industrial Zone (京葉工業地域, Keiyō Kōgyō Chiiki), also known as the Keiyō Industrial Region, the Keiyō Industrial Area, or the Keiyō Industrial Belt, is an industrial zone on the northeastern coast of Tokyo Bay that crosses 8 cities in Chiba Prefecture, Japan. The zone spans from the western part of Urayasu in the northeast to Futtsu in the southeast of the region. The zone has no political or administrative status.

== Etymology ==
The name of the industrial zone is formed from two kanji characters. The first, 京, means "capital city" and refers to Tokyo. The second, 葉, meaning "leaf", is the second kanji in "Chiba" and refers to Chiba Prefecture, and the compound refers to the Tokyo-Chiba region.

== Geography ==
The Keiyō Industrial Zone spans the coast of Tokyo Bay from Urayasu in the northeast, through Funabashi, Chiba City, Kisarazu, Kimitsu, Ichihara, Sodegaura, and ends in Futtsu to the southeast. Numerous small rivers empty into the industrial region, and provide a source of water to support industry. They include the Edo River, the Yōrō River, and the Koito River.

== History ==
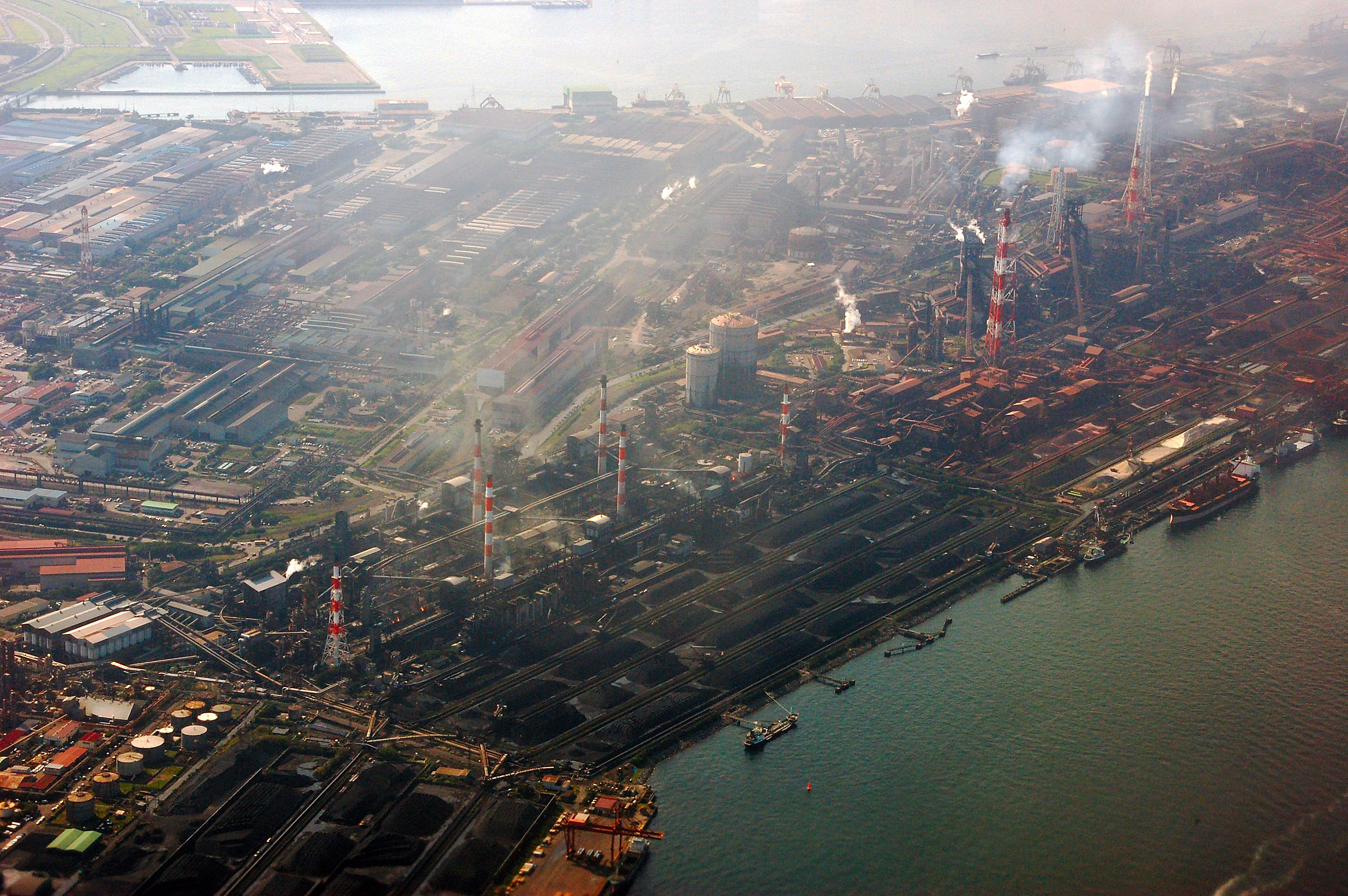
Nippon Steel Kimitsu Works

Before industrialization the Keiyō region was originally home to nori seaweed collection, the shellfish industry, mixed small-scale fishing and agricultural villages, and beach resorts. The Keihin region, spanning west from Tokyo to Yokohama, was developed after World War I. With the rapid development of the defense industry in Japan from the beginning of the Shōwa period in 1926, a plan for the decentralization of industry from the immediate Tokyo area was planned in 1935. The Keiyō Industrial Region was fully developed after World War II. Some land reclamation had been carried out in coastal areas of Tokyo Bay as part of the industrialization of Japan in the early 20th century. Reclaimed land areas replaced traditional fishing areas and supported small factories. The construction of the Kawasaki Steel Works in Chiba City in 1953 marked the beginning of the large-scale construction of heavy industry infrastructure in the industrial zone, and other industries soon followed. The deepwater ports of the Keiyō Industrial Zone were built starting in the 1950s. Thermal power generators were built, and large tracts of land were reclaimed from the bay for expansion of the Keiyō region. Keiyō was significantly expanded in the 1960s. Heavy metal and chemical production were among the highest in Japan by the 1970s.

== Industries ==
The zone is a major base for the electric power generation, petrochemical, petroleum, shipbuilding, logistics, shipping, and steel industries. The Port of Chiba is a major component to the Keiyō Industrial Region.

== Gallery ==
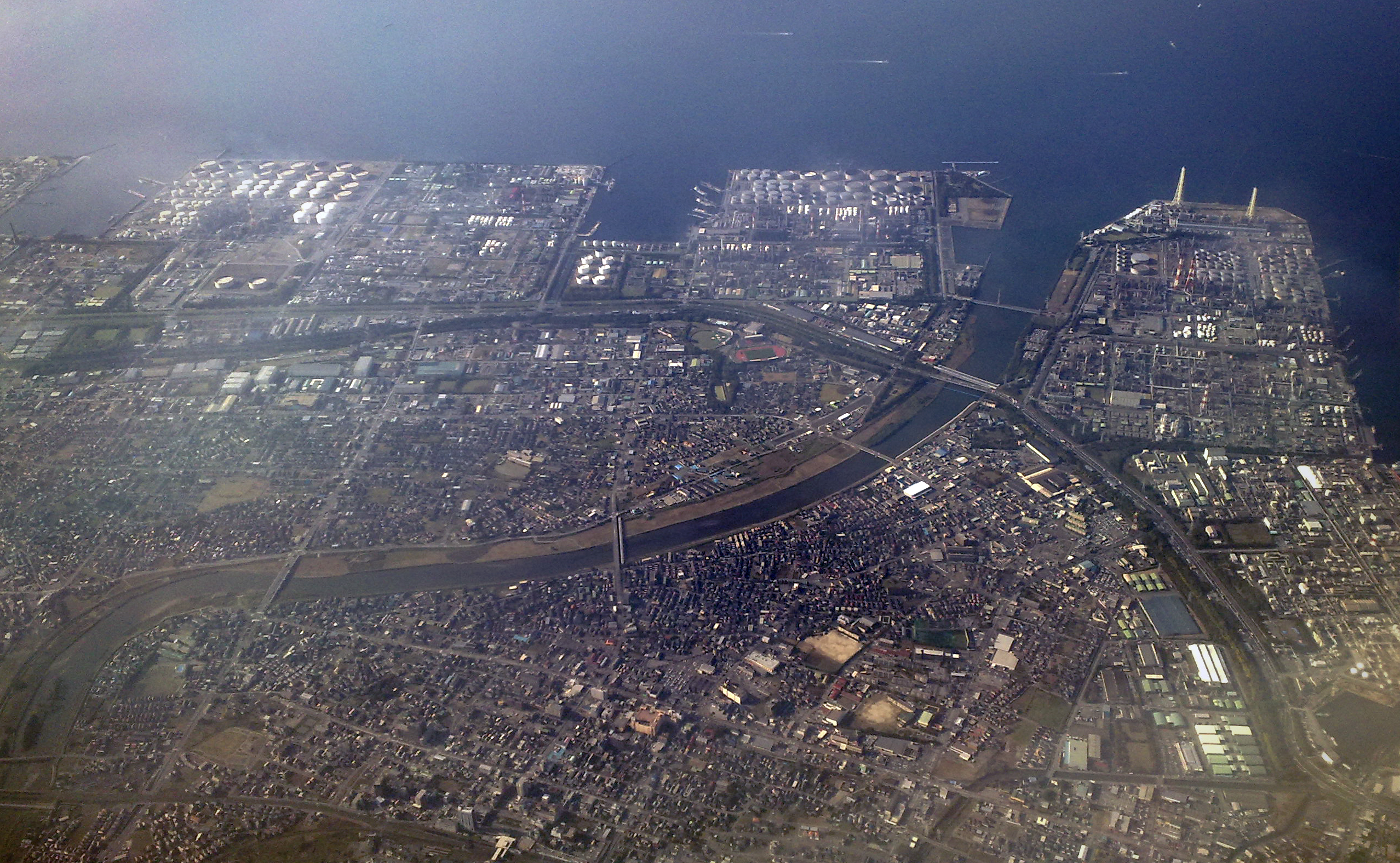
Yōrō River and Port of Chiba

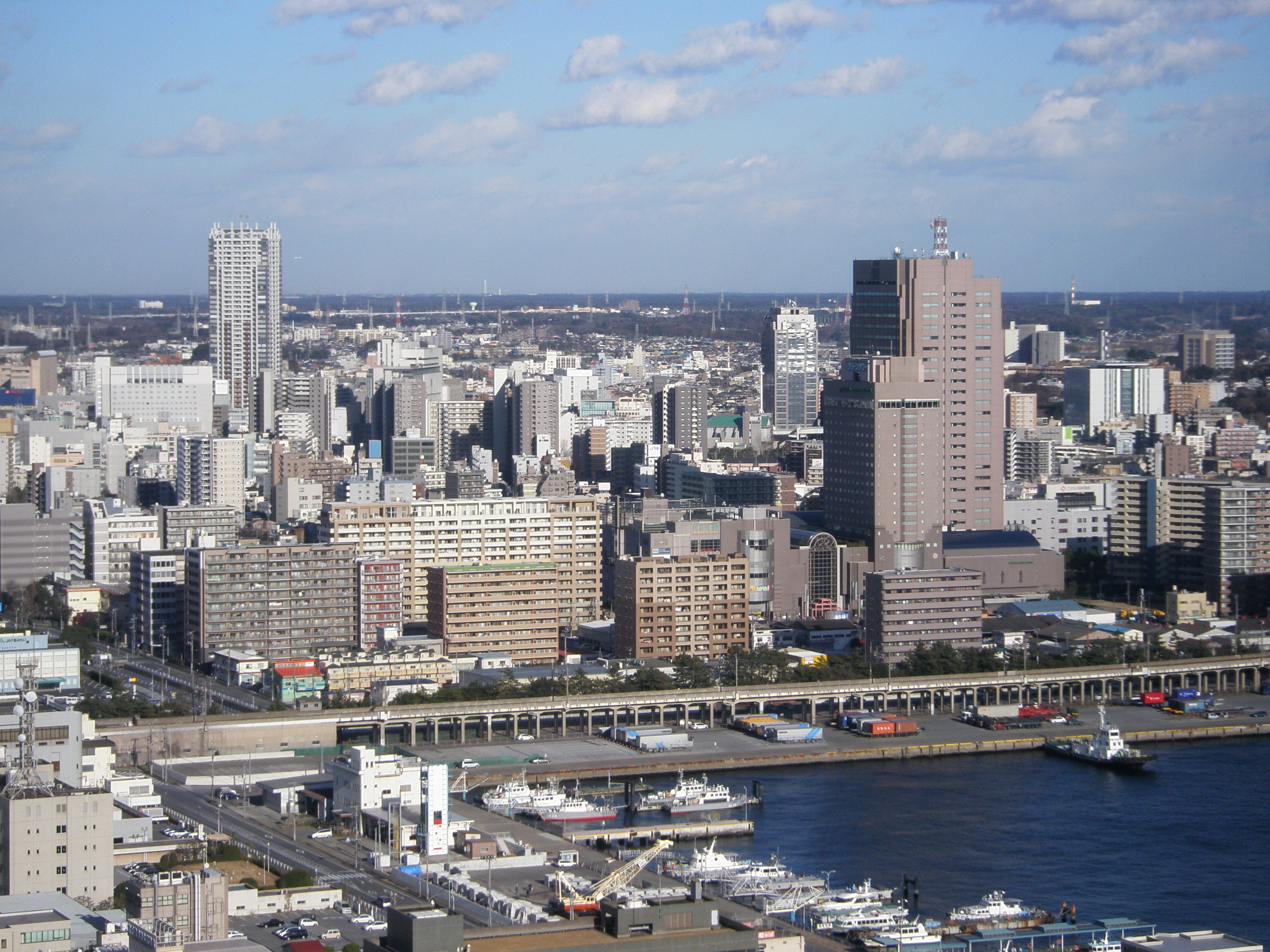
View from Chiba Port Tower
