= Japan Christian Junior College =

Japan Christian Junior College (日本キリスト教短期大学, Nihon kirisuto-kyō tanki daigaku) was a private junior college in Chiba, Chiba, Japan, established in 1951. The predecessor of the school was founded in 1946. The present name was adopted in 1958. It was founded in 1946 as the Japan Agriculture and Bible College by missionaries from the Church of the Nazarene. The first president was Rev. William A. Eckel.

Japan Christian Junior College was one of only two Nazarene schools of higher learning in Japan, the other being Japan Nazarene Theological Seminary (located in the same building as Meguro Church of the Nazarene in Meguro Ward, Tokyo). Japan Christian Junior College grew to have a student enrollment of nearly 600 by the mid-1990s, with a faculty of nearly 40 part-time and full-time teachers and professors. However, within a decade, student enrollment had dropped significantly, forcing college administration to make drastic changes.

In 2006, Japan Christian Junior College received full accreditation and Government Recognition from the Ministry of Education for its two areas of study — English and Christianity — with all diplomas and degrees retroactively regarded as equivalents to an American Associate's of Arts degree.

After an announcement by the Board of Regents, with the support of the General Church of the Nazarene, in the spring of 2006, Japan Christian Junior College closed and ceased operations on March 31, 2009. Reasons cited concerned a lack of students (attributed to the falling birth rate in Japan), loss of revenue, and departure of American teachers. All college properties were sold off to housing development companies.
