= Port of Chiba =

Port of Chiba 千葉港
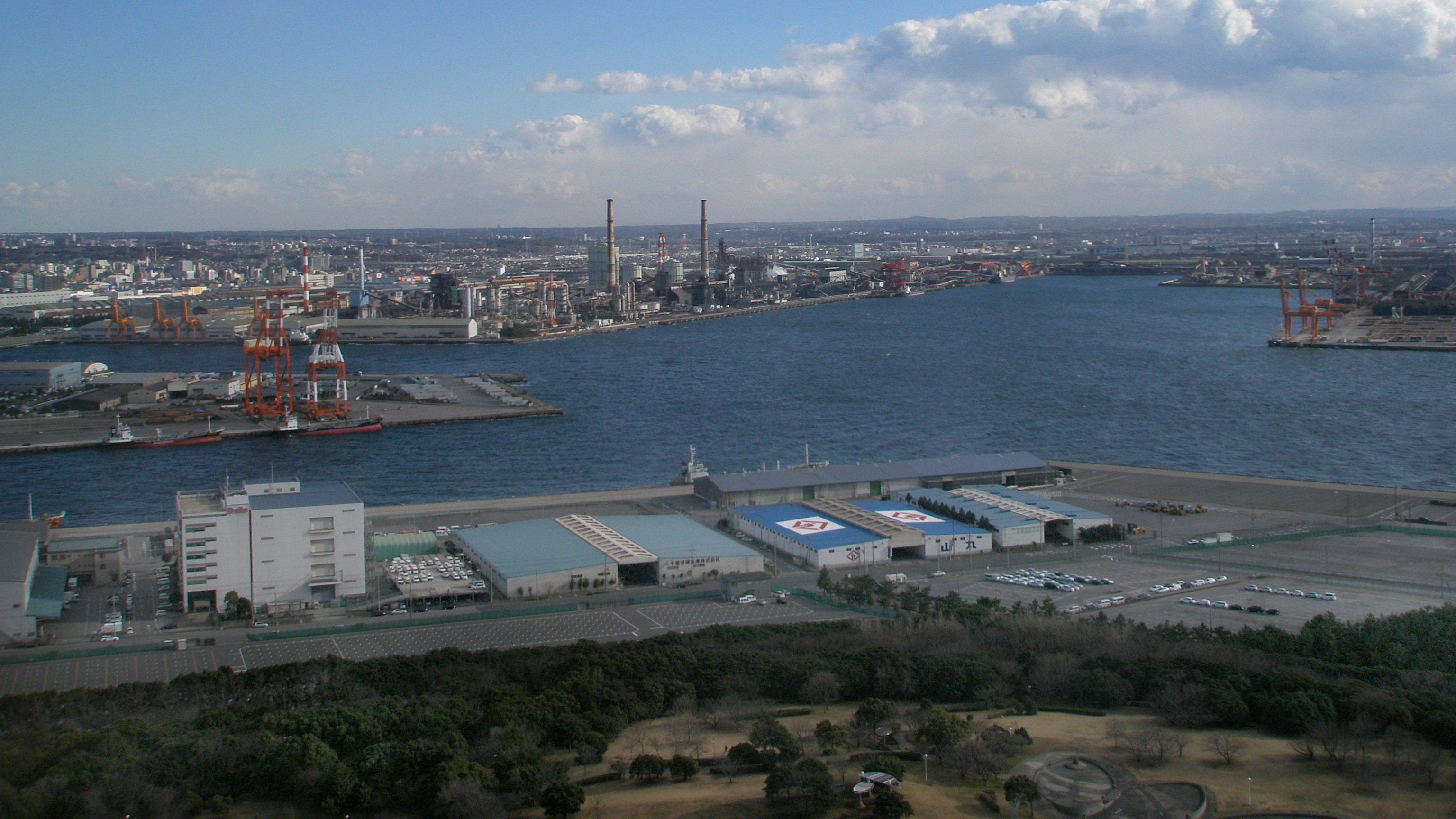
- Southeast view from Chiba Port Tower
- Click on the map for a fullscreen view

Location
- Country: Japan
- Location: Chiba Prefecture
- Coordinates: 35.607627°N 140.103836°E

Details
- Opened: 1953
- Operated by: Chiba Prefecture
- Land area: 24,800 hectares (61,000 acres)

Statistics
- Vessel arrivals: 65,200
- Annual cargo tonnage: 166,964,000 metric revenue tons
- Annual container volume: 41,780 twenty-foot equivalent units (TEU)
- Website http://www.pref.chiba.lg.jp/cs-chiba-k/index.html(in Japanese)

The Port of Chiba (千葉港, Chiba-kō) is the largest seaport in Japan, located in Chiba Prefecture on the interior of Tokyo Bay. The Port spans 24,800 hectares (61,000 acres) across the cities of Ichikawa, Funabashi, Narashino, Chiba, Ichihara, and Sodegaura.

== History ==
Port activity has existed in the area since the Kamakura period. By the end of the Edo period the port had an active trade in salt and grain with the Port of Yokohama. Land reclamation for port facilities began in 1910. The port sustained extensive damage in aerial bombing during World War II. The modern Port of Chiba opened in August 1953, and played a large part in the building of the import/export economy following the war. The port became an integral part of the Keiyō Industrial Zone.

== Cargo ==
The Port of Chiba handles 166,964,000 tons of cargo annually, ranking it second in Japan in terms of cargo handling. 65,200 vessels are handled annually.

94% of its cargo is industrial in nature. It imports crude petroleum, Liquefied Natural Gas, and other oil products, and exports chemical and steel products, and vehicles. Chiba is a minor port for marine containers, handling 41,780 TEU of marine containers, eighth in Japan.

== Management ==
The Port of Chiba is managed by the prefectural government, and is open continuously throughout the year. The central office of the port is in the Chūō-ku ward of the City of Chiba, with branch offices in Ichihara and Sodegaura. The port is accessed by rail via the JR East Keiyō Line (1 kilometre (0.62 mi)) and Narita International Airport (30 kilometres (19 mi)).

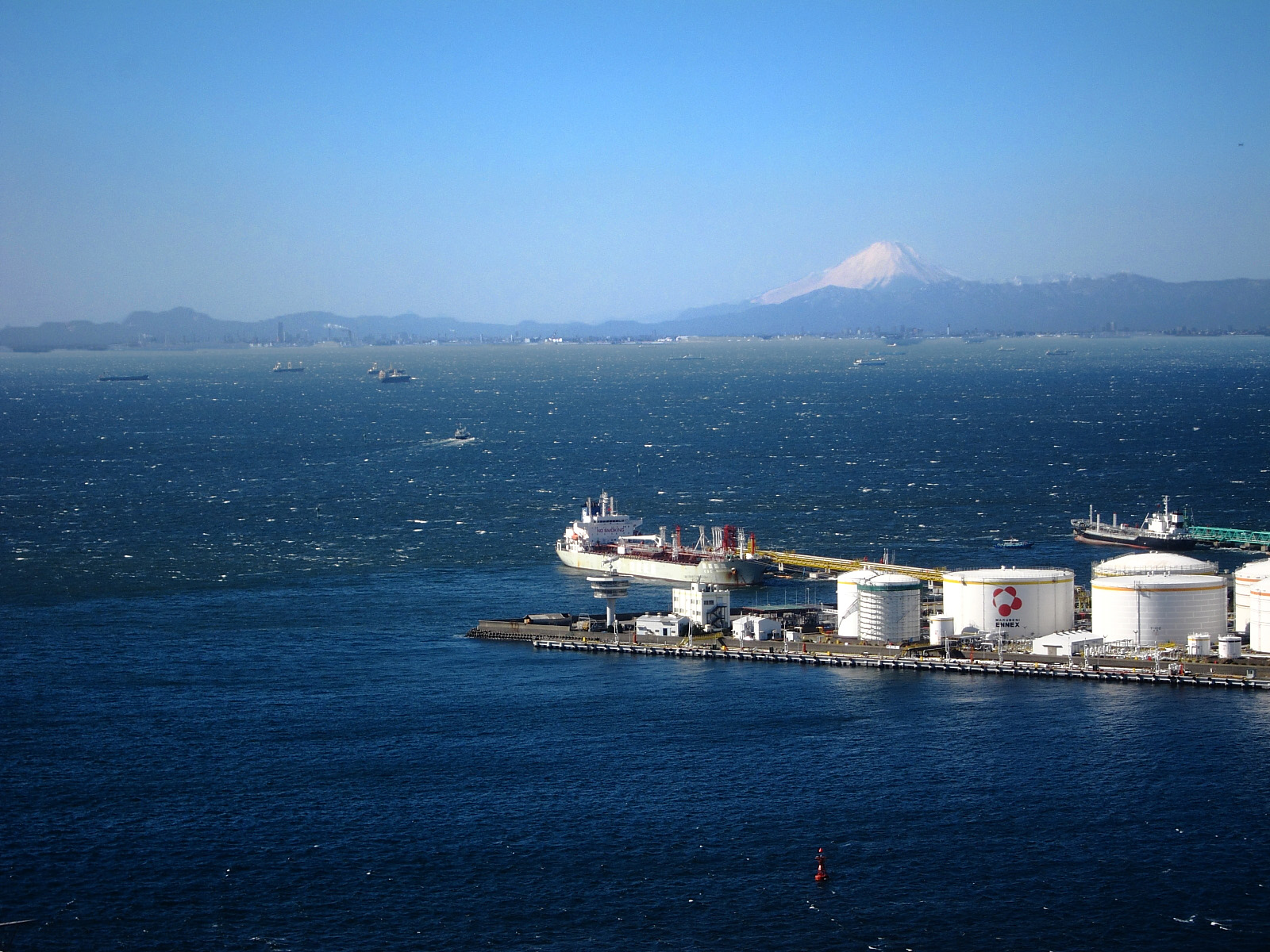
Port of Chiba

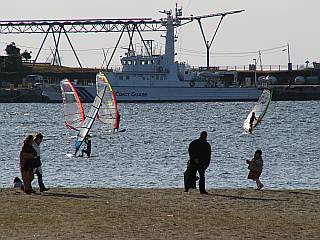
Chiba Port Park

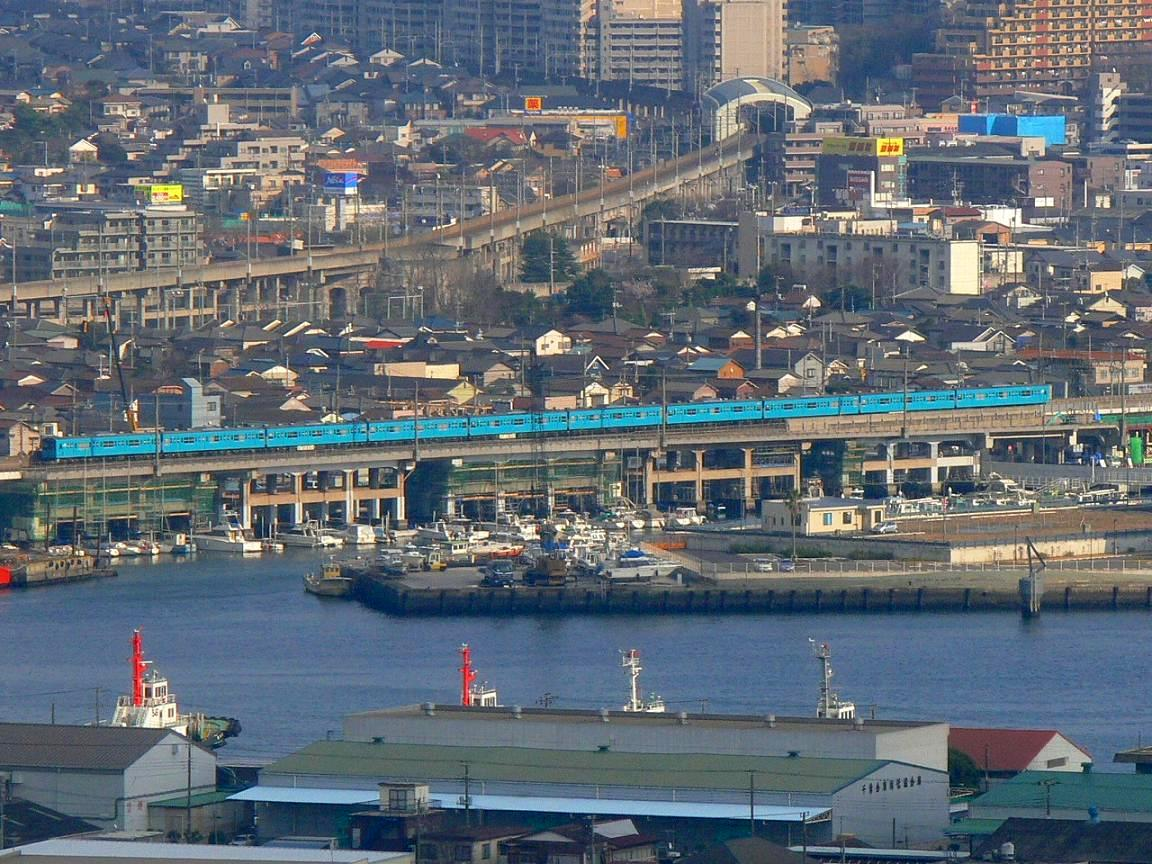
Keiyo Line as seen from Chiba Port Tower
