= Chiba Tsuneshige =

Samurai

Chiba Tsuneshige (千葉 常重, April 18, 1083 – May 28, 1180) was a Japanese samurai lord active in the Kantō region during the late Heian period. He was a descendant of Emperor Kanmu and of Taira no Tadatsune. His father was Taira no Tsunekane and his mother was the daughter of Torinoumi Saburō Tadahira (鳥海 三郎 忠衡).

According to Chiba Taikei-zu, he succeeded his younger brother, Taira no Tsuneharu (平 常晴), and went to the region of present-day Chiba, Chiba Prefecture, in 1126. He built his headquarters at Inohana and laid the foundation for the government by the Chiba clan around the region.
