= Chiba clan =

Japanese clan

Chiba 千葉
- Gessei, the mon of the Chiba clan
- Home province: Shimōsa
- Parent house: Taira clan
- Titles: Shugo
- Founder: Chiba Tsuneshige
- Founding year: 12th century
- Ruled until: 16th century
- Cadet branches: Sōma clan, Tō clan

The Chiba Clan (千葉氏 Chiba-shi) was a Japanese gōzoku and samurai family descending from the Taira clan. The clan was founded by Chiba Tsuneshige, originally Taira Tsuneshige. The Chiba governed in Shimōsa Province, and the clan was based in present-day Chiba City. Additionally, for a period, the clan controlled the Sōma Manor that extended into present-day Ibaraki. After the establishment of the Kamakura shogunate, the head of the Chiba Clan became the hereditary shugo governor of Shimōsa Province.

The Chiba Clan was originally a branch of the Kanmu-Heishi Clan and thrived mainly in the Boso Peninsula during the Middle Ages. On the 1st of June 1126, Taira Tsuneshige moved his base to the area now known as Inohana in Chuo Ward and took the name “Chiba”. This is how the history of Chiba City first began as a town, with the 1st of June known as “Chiba Foundation Day”. Tsuneshige’s son Chiba Tsunetane played a very important role in the establishment of the Kamakura Shogunate by helping Minamoto no Yoritomo, who fled to Chiba after being defeated by the Taira Clan. Tsunetane advised him to make Kamakura his base. Records show that Yoritomo trusted Tsunetane so much that he saw him as a father figure. Tsunetane acquired land in various places across Japan and passed this land down to his six sons, known as the “Chiba Rokuto”, leading to the influence of his clan spreading across the whole country.

== Origin ==
The Chiba clan descends from the 8th century Emperor Kanmu through the sequence of Imperial Prince Kazurahara (786–853) — Prince Takami — Taira no Takamochi — Muraoka Yoshifumi — Muraoka Tadayori — Chiba Tadatsune — Chiba Tsunemasa — Chiba Tsunenaga — Chiba Tsunekane — Chiba Tsuneshige — Chiba Tsunetane — Azuma Taneyori . The Emperor Go-Daigo authorized the head of Chiba family, Chiba Sadatane, as chief daimyō and samurai of the Kantō region. The clan settled in the Shimōsa area in the early 12th century. The Chiba came into conflict with Minamoto no Yoshitomo during the 1140s over estates in present-day Chiba Prefecture. The Chiba, however, came to support Yoshitomo in the Hōgen Rebellion (1156).

== Genpei War ==
During the Genpei War (1180–1185) the Chiba clan, as well as the Hōjō, Miura, and Doi clans, opposed the greater 'core' Taira clan and supported Minamoto no Yoritomo. Chiba Tsunetane, clan chief of the period, won Yoritomo’s trust and helped establish the Kamakura shogunate. The power of the clan increased in this period, but ultimately declined during the Muromachi period (1336–1573).

== Later history ==
The Chiba clan was completely conquered by Toyotomi Hideyoshi before the establishment of the Tokugawa shogunate. Many descendants of the Chiba clan live in Chiba Prefecture today. Chiba Castle, reconstructed in 1967, is built on the site of Inohana Castle, an area previously controlled by the clan.
