= Chiba Zoological Park =

Zoo in Chiba Prefecture, Japan

Coordinates: 35.645°N 140.127°E

The Chiba Zoological Park is located in Chiba Prefecture, east of Tokyo, Japan, and near the shore of Tokyo Bay. The park can be accessed by the Chiba Monorail and is open between 9:30am and 4:30pm.

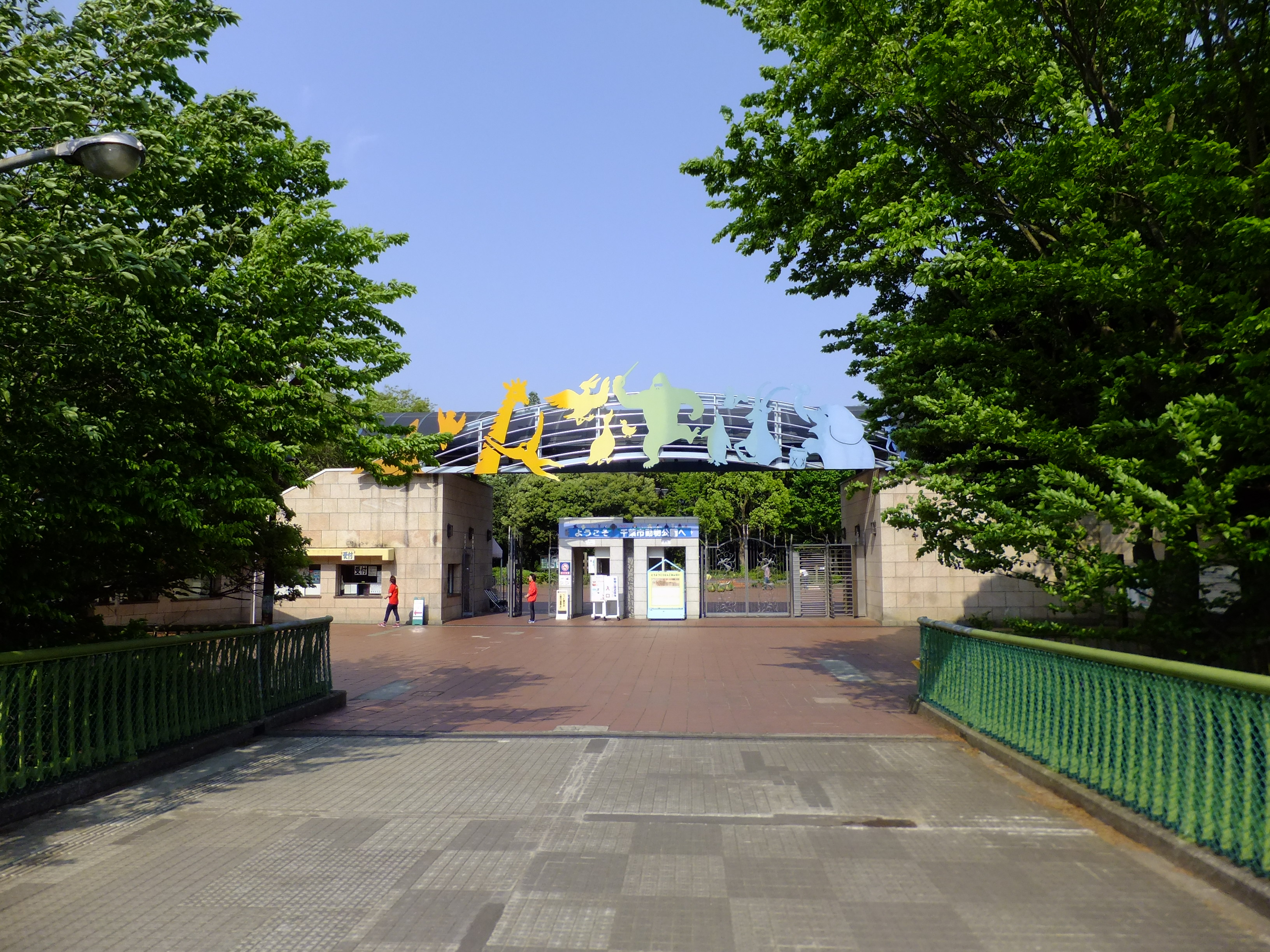
Chiba Zoological Park Main Gate

== Overview ==
The Chiba Zoological Park opened its doors for the first time in April 1985, and now includes seven different areas.

== Animals ==
As of April 2026, the park houses approximately 91 species. The collection includes 34 species of mammals, 42 species of birds, 8 species of reptiles, 6 species of fish, and 1 species of crustacean. Many of the animals are listed on the IUCN Red List. The park keeps several critically endangered species, including the western lowland gorilla (Gorilla gorilla gorilla), the cotton-top tamarin (Saguinus oedipus), the Celebes macaque (Macaca nigra), and the black-and-white ruffed lemur (Varecia variegata). The park is the only zoo in Japan that keeps the black-tailed marmoset (Mico melanurus). The scimitar-horned oryx (Oryx dammah), which is extinct in the wild, can also be seen at the park.

=== Zoological Hall ===
The Zoological Hall reopened in March 2025 after its first major renovation in 40 years. The new exhibit is called (生命の森 熱帯雨林, "Forest of Life: Tropical Rainforest"). The hall teaches visitors about tropical rainforests. Visitors can learn why rainforests are important, what animals live there, and how human activity is affecting them.The entrance features a large diorama of a Bornean rainforest.A tall model tree stands at the center of the hall. Five large screens show videos about rainforest environments around the world.Every day at around 2:30 PM, the hall recreates a tropical rainstorm. Visitors can watch how birds and sloths react to the sudden rain. The hall also has a nocturnal animal area, a marmoset exhibit, and a Bird Hall. A café called Utan Café is on the second floor. It serves fair-trade food and drinks.

=== The small animals zone ===
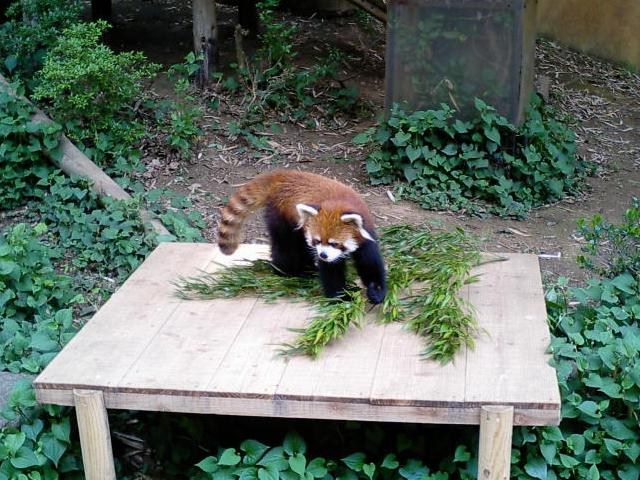
Futa in 2005

This area is the home of the zoo mascot, Futa the red panda, who became a TV celebrity in 2005. The area also houses other red pandas called Chichi, Meimei, Meita, Kuta, Mai, Mii, and Genta.

=== Steppe Zone ===
This area has big herbivores on display, such as elephants, giraffes, and zebras, but also has South African cranes, ostriches and meerkats.

=== Children's Zoo ===
This area was designed to stimulate a visitor's interest in wildlife by getting in direct contact with animals such as goats and sheep. The area also includes horses, capybaras, and penguins from Peru and Chile. An explanation of the zookeepers' routine also allows the visitors to get a good understanding of what it takes to take care of the animals in the Park.

=== Monkey Zone ===
As indicated by the name, this area is essentially focused on primates such as lemurs and mandrills, as well as several other species.

=== Ancestors of Domestic Animals Zone ===
This area houses animals such as bison, and depending on the seasons, there can be different ones present (such as reindeer during Christmas).

=== Avian and Aquatic Zone ===
The sea lions are the main attraction of this area, but other species such as the shoe-billed stork are present and attract a lot of visitors.

=== Conservation and Breeding ===
The park has successfully bred many rare species. In June 2021, a female cheetah named Zuraya gave birth to six cubs. This was the first cheetah birth at the park. The cubs' parents came from zoos in Norway, Czech Republic, and France. The birth was part of a breeding program to protect cheetahs and keep their genes diverse.

In March 2026, the park was officially certified by Japan's Ministry of the Environment as a Rare Species Conservation Zoo. Only 27 facilities in Japan hold this certification. It covers 24 species kept at the park, including cheetahs, gorillas, and chimpanzees.

=== Animal Enrichment Programs ===
・Cheetah Run ・・・The cheetah (Acinonyx jubatus) is the fastest land animal, capable of reaching speeds of approximately 110–120 km/h. As opportunities for high-speed running are limited in captivity, the park uses a lure system to encourage the cheetahs to sprint. Visitors can observe the animals' exceptional speed and agility during these sessions. The program is suspended during summer months.

・Lion Meat Catcher ・・・In the wild, lions use their forelimbs to overpower and restrain prey. To replicate this behavior, meat is suspended at height in the outdoor enclosure, encouraging the lions to rear up on their hind legs and strike at the food. This program serves as both an enrichment activity and a demonstration of natural predatory behavior.

・Egyptian Vulture Egg-Cracking Event・・・The Egyptian vulture is one of the few bird species known to use tools. In the wild, individuals have been documented using rocks to break open ostrich eggs to access their contents — a behavior regarded as evidence of advanced cognitive ability. In spring, the park places ostrich eggs in the Egyptian vulture's enclosure, where visitors may observe the bird repeatedly striking the eggs with stones held in its beak. Note that the eggs are not always successfully broken.

== Cherry Blossoms ==
The park is well known as a cherry blossom spot in Chiba City. About 580 cherry trees of more than ten varieties grow throughout the park. The season starts in early March with Kawazu cherry trees (Prunus campanulata). From late March to early April, Yoshino cherry trees (Somei Yoshino), Yoko, Yaebeni-shidare, and Oshima cherry trees come into bloom. From mid to late April, varieties such as Chihara cherry, Ichihara Toranoo, Kanzan, and Fugenzo flower in turn. This long season allows visitors to enjoy cherry blossoms from early spring through late April. Visitors can watch the animals and cherry blossoms at the same time.

== ACCESS ==
The park is easy to reach from Tokyo, Chiba Station, and Narita Airport. The nearest station is Dobutsukoen Station (動物公園) on the Chiba Urban Monorail Line 2. The main gate is a one-minute walk from the station through a covered walkway.

・From Tokyo Station Take the JR Chūō-Sōbu Line from Tokyo Station to Chiba Station (about 40 or 50 minutes). Then transfer to the Chiba Urban Monorail Line 2 and ride to Dobutsukoen Station (about 12 minutes). Total travel time is about 55 minutes.

・From Chiba Station Take the Chiba Urban Monorail Line 2 from Chiba Station to Dobutsukoen Station. The ride takes about 12 minutes.

・From Narita Airport Take the JR Narita Line from Narita Airport Station to Chiba Station (about 60 minutes). Then transfer to the Chiba Urban Monorail Line 2 to Dobutsukoen Station (about 12 minutes). Total travel time is about 75 minutes.

・From Kyoto Station Take the Tokaido Shinkansen from Kyoto Station to Tokyo Station (about 3hours). Then take the JR Chūō-Sōbu Line to Chiba Station (about 40 minutes). Transfer to the Chiba Urban Monorail Line 2 and ride to Dobutsukoen Station (about 12 minutes). Total travel time is about 3 hours.

== Admission and Hours ==
The park is open from 9:30 AM to 4:30 PM (last entry at 4:00 PM). It is closed every Wednesday and from December 29 to January 1. Admission is ¥800 for adults (high school students and older). Children in junior high school and younger enter for free. Tickets can be bought at the gate or online in advance. Online tickets are valid for three months from the date of purchase.A typical visit takes about 2 to 3 hours.

== Visitors ==
The park attracts about 560,000 to 580,000 visitors each year. In fiscal year 2023, 572,619 people visited the park. In fiscal year 2024, the number was 562,037. It celebrated its 40th anniversary in April 2025. Since opening, the park has welcomed over 27 million visitors in total.

== Nearby Attractions ==
The park makes a good base for exploring Chiba City. From Chiba Station, visitors can ride the world's longest suspended monorail to reach the park or continue to Chiba Port Park, which overlooks Tokyo Bay. Tokyo Disney Resort is about 50 minutes away by train. Makuhari Messe, a major convention and events venue, is also nearby.
