= Chiba Keizai University =

Higher education institution in Chiba Prefecture, Japan

Coordinates: 35°37′10.31″N 140°06′57.29″E

- 千葉経済大学; Chiba Keizai Daigaku
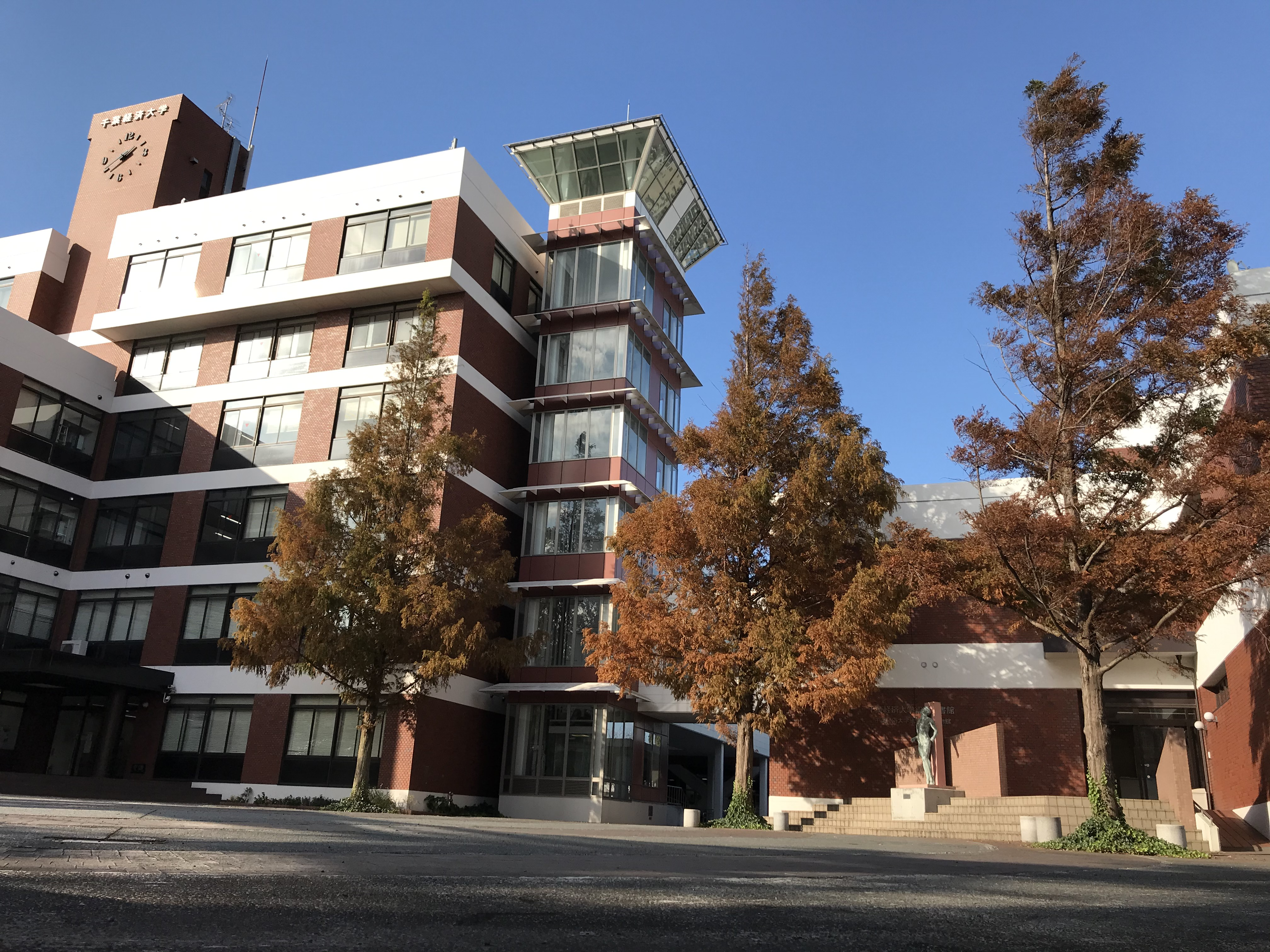
- Type: Private
- Established: 1968
- Location: Inage-ku, Chiba, Chiba, Japan
- Website: www.cku.ac.jp

Chiba Keizai University (千葉経済大学, Chiba Keizai Daigaku; Chiba Economics University) is a private university in Inage-ku, Chiba, Japan. This university is established by Chiba Keizai Academy(hereinafter, this is called 'CKA'). Moreover, CKA has a junior college and high school.

== Overview ==
The university has only a Faculty of Economics, the Department of Economics and the Department of Business Administration are located under the Faculty of Economics.

And the junior college contains the Department of Business Life and the Department of Elementary Education.

== Chronology ==
- 1968: Chiba Keizai College was founded.
- 1988: Chiba Keizai University was founded.
